= 1974 Italian Open – Men's singles =

Men's singles
- 1974 Italian Open

Final
- Champion: (Sweden) Björn Borg
- Runner-up: (Romania) Ilie Năstase
- Score: 6–3, 6–4, 6–2

Details
- Draw: 64
- Seeds: 16

Events
Singles	men	women
Doubles	men	women
← 1973 ·	Italian Open	· 1975 →

The 1974 Italian Open – Men's singles was an event of the 1974 Italian Open tennis tournament and was played on outdoor clay courts at the Foro Italico in Rome, Italy from 26 May through 3 June 1974. The draw comprised 64 players and 16 of them were seeded. Ilie Năstase was the defending champion. Third-seeded Björn Borg won the singles title, defeating first-seeded Ilie Năstase in the final, 6–3, 6–4, 6–2.

== Seeds ==
1. (Romania) Ilie Năstase (final)
2. (Czechoslovakia) Jan Kodeš (second round)
3. (Sweden) Björn Borg (champion)
4. (United States) Stan Smith (semifinals)
5. (Italy) Adriano Panatta (first round)
6. (Spain) Manuel Orantes (quarterfinals)
7. (Italy) Paolo Bertolucci (first round)
8. (Soviet Union) Alex Metreveli (quarterfinals)
9. (Czechoslovakia) Jiří Hřebec (third round)
10. (Chile) Jaime Fillol (first round)
11. (United States) Tom Gorman (second round)
12. (United States) Brian Gottfried (quarterfinals)
13. (United States) Eddie Dibbs (third round)
14. (United States) Marty Riessen (third round)
15. (Mexico) Raúl Ramírez (second round)
16. (United States) Roscoe Tanner (third round)

Click on the seed number of a player to go to their draw section.

== Draw ==
=== Key ===
- Q = Qualifier
- WC = Wild card
- LL = Lucky loser
- Alt = Alternate
- SE = Special exempt
- PR = Protected ranking
- ITF = ITF entry
- JE = Junior exempt
- w/o = Walkover
- r = Retired
- d = Defaulted
- SR = Special ranking

=== Finals ===
Quarterfinals
(United States) Steve Krulevitz	0	1
(Argentina) Guillermo Vilas	6	6
3	(Sweden) Björn Borg	6	7
6	(Spain) Manuel Orantes	2	5
12	(United States) Brian Gottfried	3	4
4	(United States) Stan Smith	6	6
8	(Soviet Union) Alex Metreveli	1	5
1	(Romania) Ilie Năstase	6	7

Semifinals
(Argentina) Guillermo Vilas	6	6	3	4	5
3	(Sweden) Björn Borg	2	3	6	6	7
4	(United States) Stan Smith	2	2	4
1	(Romania) Ilie Năstase	6	6	6

Final
3	(Sweden) Björn Borg	6	6	6
1	(Romania) Ilie Năstase	3	4	2

=== Top half ===
==== Section 1 ====
First Round
2	(Czechoslovakia) Jan Kodeš	6	6
(France) Wanaro N'Godrella	1	2
(Colombia) Iván Molina	5	2
(Italy) Tonino Zugarelli	7	6
15	(Mexico) Raúl Ramírez	6	6
(Argentina) Francisco Mastelli	2	4
(United States) Steve Krulevitz	7	6
(Spain) Juan Gisbert Sr.	5	2
7	(Italy) Paolo Bertolucci	5	5
(West Germany) Karl Meiler	7	7
(West Germany) Hans-Jürgen Pohmann	6	6
(United States) Jeff Borowiak	3	3
10	(Chile) Jaime Fillol	6	6	4
(Australia) Dick Crealy	7	4	6
(Argentina) Guillermo Vilas	6	6
(Paraguay) Víctor Pecci	2	2

Second Round
2	(Czechoslovakia) Jan Kodeš	6	6	4^{r}
(Italy) Tonino Zugarelli	7	3	5
15	(Mexico) Raúl Ramírez	0	2
(United States) Steve Krulevitz	6	6
(West Germany) Karl Meiler	2	7	6
(West Germany) Hans-Jürgen Pohmann	6	5	3
(Australia) Dick Crealy	0	1
(Argentina) Guillermo Vilas	6	6

Third Round
(Italy) Tonino Zugarelli	2	6
(United States) Steve Krulevitz	6	7
(West Germany) Karl Meiler	2	1
(Argentina) Guillermo Vilas	6	6

Quarterfinals
(United States) Steve Krulevitz	0	1
(Argentina) Guillermo Vilas	6	6

==== Section 2 ====
First Round
3	(Sweden) Björn Borg	6	7
(France) Patrice Dominguez	2	5
(Chile) Jaime Pinto Bravo	6	7
(Italy) Piero Toci	4	6
14	(United States) Marty Riessen	7	6
(Australia) Colin Dibley	5	4
(Czechoslovakia) Vladimír Zedník	2	4
(United States) Bob Lutz	6	6
6	(Spain) Manuel Orantes	6	6
(France) Georges Goven	0	3
(United States) Erik van Dillen	7	7
(Russia) Vladimir Korotkov	6	6
11	(United States) Tom Gorman	6	3	6
(United States) Harold Solomon	4	6	2
(France) Pierre Barthès	6	3
(Rhodesia) Roger Dowdeswell	7	6

Second Round
3	(Sweden) Björn Borg	6	6	6
(Chile) Jaime Pinto Bravo	7	2	1
14	(United States) Marty Riessen	6	6
(United States) Bob Lutz	2	3
6	(Spain) Manuel Orantes	6	6
(United States) Erik van Dillen	0	0
11	(United States) Tom Gorman	3	6
(Rhodesia) Roger Dowdeswell	6	7

Third Round
3	(Sweden) Björn Borg	6	7
14	(United States) Marty Riessen	1	6
6	(Spain) Manuel Orantes	6	6
(Rhodesia) Roger Dowdeswell	1	1

Quarterfinals
3	(Sweden) Björn Borg	6	7
6	(Spain) Manuel Orantes	2	5

=== Bottom half ===
==== Section 3 ====
First Round
(Socialist Federal Republic of Yugoslavia) Boro Jovanović	7	0	6
(West Germany) Jürgen Fassbender	5	6	4
(United States) Sherwood Stewart	2	0
12	(United States) Brian Gottfried	6	6
(Sweden) Leif Johansson	3	2
(Socialist Federal Republic of Yugoslavia) Željko Franulović	6	6
(Egypt) Ismail El Shafei	3	6	6
5	(Italy) Adriano Panatta	6	2	1
(Australia) Barry Phillips-Moore	7	6	6
(Romania) Dumitru Hărădău	6	7	4
(Italy) Vincenzo Franchitti	7	2	6
13	(United States) Eddie Dibbs	6	6	7
(West Germany) Attila Korpás	6	6
(Austria) Hans Kary	4	4
(Japan) Jun Kuki	5	5
4	(United States) Stan Smith	7	7

Second Round
(Socialist Federal Republic of Yugoslavia) Boro Jovanović	5	0
12	(United States) Brian Gottfried	7	6
(Socialist Federal Republic of Yugoslavia) Željko Franulović	1	6	4
(Egypt) Ismail El Shafei	6	3	6
(Australia) Barry Phillips-Moore	6	2
13	(United States) Eddie Dibbs	7	6
(West Germany) Attila Korpás	3	2
4	(United States) Stan Smith	6	6

Third Round
12	(United States) Brian Gottfried	7	6
(Egypt) Ismail El Shafei	5	0
13	(United States) Eddie Dibbs	5	0
4	(United States) Stan Smith	7	6

Quarterfinals
12	(United States) Brian Gottfried	3	4
4	(United States) Stan Smith	6	6

==== Section 4 ====
First Round
(New Zealand) Onny Parun	6	6
(France) Patrick Proisy	2	4
(Brazil) Thomaz Koch	4	4
9	(Czechoslovakia) Jiří Hřebec	6	6
(United States) Charlie Pasarell	6	2	6
(United States) Paul Gerken	2	6	3
(Hungary) Balázs Taróczy	3	4
8	(Soviet Union) Alex Metreveli	6	6
(Sweden) Kjell Johansson	5	3
(Italy) Corrado Barazzutti	7	6
(Sweden) Ove Bengtson	3	0
16	(United States) Roscoe Tanner	6	6
(India) Vijay Amritraj	6	6	7
(Italy) Ezio Di Matteo	2	7	6
(Italy) Martin Mulligan	4	7	2
1	(Romania) Ilie Năstase	6	5	6

Second Round
(New Zealand) Onny Parun	2	7	1
9	(Czechoslovakia) Jiří Hřebec	6	6	6
(United States) Charlie Pasarell	3	4
8	(Soviet Union) Alex Metreveli	6	6
(Italy) Corrado Barazzutti	2	4
16	(United States) Roscoe Tanner	6	6
(India) Vijay Amritraj	2	6	5
1	(Romania) Ilie Năstase	6	3	7

Third Round
9	(Czechoslovakia) Jiří Hřebec	2	1
8	(Soviet Union) Alex Metreveli	6	6
16	(United States) Roscoe Tanner	6	1	3
1	(Romania) Ilie Năstase	3	6	6

Quarterfinals
8	(Soviet Union) Alex Metreveli	1	5
1	(Romania) Ilie Năstase	6	7
