= 1983 Italian Open – Women's singles =

Women's singles
- 1983 Italian Open

Final
- Champion: (Hungary) Andrea Temesvári
- Runner-up: (United States) Bonnie Gadusek
- Score: 6–1, 6–0

Details
- Draw: 56
- Seeds: 14

Events
Singles	men	women
Doubles	men	women
← 1982 ·	Italian Open	· 1984 →

Chris Evert-Lloyd was the defending champion but did not compete that year.

Andrea Temesvári won in the final 6–1, 6–0 against Bonnie Gadusek.

== Seeds ==
A champion seed is indicated in bold text while text in italics indicates the round in which that seed was eliminated. The top eight seeds received a bye to the second round.

1. (Romania) Virginia Ruzici (third round)
2. (United States) Kathy Rinaldi (semifinals)
3. (Hungary) **Andrea Temesvári (champion)**
4. (United States) Bonnie Gadusek (final)
5. (Australia) Evonne Goolagong Cawley (second round)
6. (South Africa) Yvonne Vermaak (third round)
7. (United Kingdom) Jo Durie (quarterfinals)
8. (Czechoslovakia) Helena Suková (quarterfinals)
9. (Bulgaria) Manuela Maleeva (third round)
10. (Socialist Federal Republic of Yugoslavia) Mima Jaušovec (third round)
11. (United States) Lisa Bonder (second round)
12. (France) Catherine Tanvier (first round)
13. (Argentina) Ivanna Madruga-Osses (third round)
14. (Czechoslovakia) Iva Budařová (third round)

== Draw ==
=== Key ===
- Q = Qualifier
- WC = Wild card
- LL = Lucky loser
- Alt = Alternate
- ITF = ITF entry
- PR = Protected ranking
- SR = Special ranking
- SE = Special exempt
- JE = Junior exempt
- JR = Junior Accelerator Programme entrant
- CO = College Accelerator Programme entrant
- NG = Next Gen Accelerator Program entrant
- w/o = Walkover
- r = Retired
- d = Defaulted

=== Finals ===
Quarterfinals
**(United States) Kathleen Horvath**	**6**	**6**
(Switzerland) Christiane Jolissaint	4	1
4	**(United States) Bonnie Gadusek**	**6**	**6**
7	(United Kingdom) Jo Durie	2	3
8	(Czechoslovakia) Helena Suková	4	1
3	**(Hungary) Andrea Temesvári**	**6**	**6**
(Peru) Laura Arraya	**6**	3	2
2	**(United States) Kathy Rinaldi**	4	**6**	**6**

Semifinals
(United States) Kathleen Horvath	1	**6**	1
4	(United States) **Bonnie Gadusek**	**6**	3	**6**
3	(Hungary) **Andrea Temesvári**	**6**	**6**
2	(United States) Kathy Rinaldi	0	0

Final
4	(United States) Bonnie Gadusek	1	0
3	(Hungary) **Andrea Temesvári**	**6**	**6**

=== Top half ===
==== Section 1 ====
First round
(Italy) **B Rossi**	**7**	**6**
(United States) V Nelson	6	1
(Sweden) **L Sandin**	**6**	1	**7**
(Sweden) C Jexell	1	**6**	6
(United States) **K Horvath**	**6**	**6**
12	(France) C Tanvier	3	0
(United States) S Collins	6	3
(France) **C Vanier**	**7**	**6**
(United States) **P Casale**	**7**	1	**6**
(Brazil) P Medrado	5	**6**	2
(South Korea) D-H Lee	4	**6**	2
(Switzerland) **C Jolissaint**	**6**	4	**6**

Second round
1	(Romania) **V Ruzici**	**6**	**7**
(Italy) B Rossi	4	6
(Sweden) L Sandin	0	4
(United States) **K Horvath**	**6**	**6**
(France) C Vanier	0	5
(United States) **P Casale**	**6**	**7**
(Switzerland) **C Jolissaint**	**6**	**6**
5	(Australia) E Goolagong Cawley	4	2

Third round
1	(Romania) V Ruzici	5	1
(United States) **K Horvath**	**7**	**6**
(United States) P Casale	3	3
(Switzerland) **C Jolissaint**	**6**	**6**

Quarterfinals
(United States) **K Horvath**	**6**	**6**
(Switzerland) C Jolissaint	4	1

==== Section 2 ====
First round
Q	(United States) **B Bramblett**	**6**	**6**
(South Africa) J Mundel	2	2
(Australia) **A Minter**	**6**	**6**
(Czechoslovakia) M Skuherská	1	3
Q	(United States) B Bowes	2	2
10	(Socialist Federal Republic of Yugoslavia) **M Jaušovec**	**6**	**6**
13	(Argentina) **I Madruga-Osses**	**6**	**6**
Q	(Argentina) E Raponi-Longo	3	2
Q	(South Africa) R Uys	**6**	5	3
(United Kingdom) **V Wade**	4	**7**	**6**
(Romania) L Romanov	4	6
(United States) **J Klitch**	**6**	**7**

Second round
4	(United States) **B Gadusek**	**6**	**6**
Q	(United States) B Bramblett	2	1
(Australia) A Minter	1	4
10	(Socialist Federal Republic of Yugoslavia) **M Jaušovec**	**6**	**6**
13	(Argentina) **I Madruga-Osses**	**6**	**7**
(United Kingdom) V Wade	3	5
(United States) J Klitch	2	2
7	(United Kingdom) **J Durie**	**6**	**6**

Third round
4	(United States) **B Gadusek**	**7**	5	**6**
10	(Socialist Federal Republic of Yugoslavia) M Jaušovec	6	**7**	3
13	(Argentina) I Madruga-Osses	2	4
7	(United Kingdom) **J Durie**	**6**	**6**

Quarterfinals
4	(United States) **B Gadusek**	**6**	**6**
7	(United Kingdom) J Durie	2	3

=== Bottom half ===
==== Section 3 ====
First round
Q	(France) C Suire	1	1
(United States) **J Harrington**	**6**	**6**
(United States) **K Latham**	**2**
Q	(United States) S Rehe	2	r
(Czechoslovakia) **K Skronská**	**7**	**6**
(United Kingdom) A Hobbs	6	2
9	(Bulgaria) **M Maleeva**	**6**	**6**
(United States) A Holton	0	2
(United States) **P Smith**	2	**6**	**7**
(United Kingdom) S Barker	**6**	2	6
(Peru) P Vásquez	4	3
(Italy) **R Reggi**	**6**	**6**

Second round
8	(Czechoslovakia) **H Suková**	**6**	**6**
(United States) J Harrington	1	2
(United States) K Latham	3	3
(Czechoslovakia) **K Skronská**	**6**	**6**
9	(Bulgaria) **M Maleeva**	**6**	**6**
(United States) P Smith	3	1
(Italy) R Reggi	0	6
3	(Hungary) **A Temesvári**	**6**	**7**

Third round
8	(Czechoslovakia) **H Suková**	**6**	**6**
(Czechoslovakia) K Skronská	2	0
9	(Bulgaria) M Maleeva	2	0
3	(Hungary) **A Temesvári**	**6**	**6**

Quarterfinals
8	(Czechoslovakia) H Suková	4	1
3	(Hungary) **A Temesvári**	**6**	**6**

==== Section 4 ====
First round
(United States) S Mascarin	4	2
(United States) **D Gilbert**	**6**	**6**
(Czechoslovakia) R Tomanová	3	4
(Peru) **L Arraya**	**6**	**6**
Q	(Czechoslovakia) Y Brzáková	3	**7**	1
11	(United States) **L Bonder**	**6**	5	**6**
14	(Czechoslovakia) **I Budařová**	**6**	**6**
(Italy) S Simmonds	1	3
Q	(West Germany) **C Dries**	1	**6**	**6**
(United States) J Fuchs	**6**	3	2
(Italy) **S Cecchini**	**6**	**6**
(United States) P Fendick	4	2

Second round
6	(South Africa) **Y Vermaak**	**6**	**6**
(United States) D Gilbert	0	3
(Peru) **L Arraya**	**7**	4	**7**
11	(United States) L Bonder	5	**6**	6
14	(Czechoslovakia) **I Budařová**	**6**	**6**
Q	(West Germany) C Dries	2	3
(Italy) S Cecchini	**7**	4	0
2	(United States) **K Rinaldi**	5	**6**	**6**

Third round
6	(South Africa) Y Vermaak	4	4
(Peru) **L Arraya**	**6**	**6**
14	(Czechoslovakia) I Budařová	3	1
2	(United States) **K Rinaldi**	**6**	**6**

Quarterfinals
(Peru) L Arraya	**6**	3	2
2	(United States) **K Rinaldi**	4	**6**	**6**
