= 1983 Italian Open (tennis) =

- Date: 16–22 May (men); 2–8 May (women)
- Edition: 40th
- Prize money: $300,000 (men) $150,000 (women)
- Surface: Clay / outdoor
- Location: Rome, Italy (men); Perugia, Italy (women)
- Venue: Foro Italico (men)

Champions

Men's singles
- (United States) Jimmy Arias

Women's singles
- (Hungary) Andrea Temesvári

Men's doubles
- (Paraguay) Francisco González / (Paraguay) Víctor Pecci

Women's doubles
- (Romania) Virginia Ruzici / (United Kingdom) Virginia Wade
← 1982 ·	Italian Open	· 1984 →

The 1983 Italian Open was a tennis tournament that was played by men on outdoor clay courts at the Foro Italico in Rome, Italy and was part of the 1983 Volvo Grand Prix. The women's tournament was played on outdoor clay courts in Perugia, Italy and was part of the 1983 Virginia Slims World Championship Series. The men's tournament was held from 16 through 22 May 1983 while the women's tournament was played from 2 through 8 May 1983. Jimmy Arias and Andrea Temesvári won the singles titles.

== Finals ==
=== Men's singles ===
(United States) Jimmy Arias defeated (Spain) José Higueras 6–2, 6–7^{(3–7)}, 6–1, 6–4

- It was Arias' 2nd singles title of the year and the 3rd of his career.

=== Women's singles ===
(Hungary) Andrea Temesvári defeated (United States) Bonnie Gadusek 6–1, 6–0

- It was Temesvári's 1st singles title of the year and the 1st of her career.

=== Men's doubles ===
(Paraguay) Francisco González / (Paraguay) Víctor Pecci defeated (Sweden) Jan Gunnarsson / (United States) Mike Leach 6–2, 6–7, 6–4

- It was González's 2nd title of the year and the 5th of his career. It was Pecci's 3rd title of the year and the 20th of his career.

=== Women's doubles ===
(Romania) Virginia Ruzici / (United Kingdom) Virginia Wade defeated (Argentina) Ivanna Madruga-Osses / (France) Catherine Tanvier 6–3, 2–6, 6–1

- It was Ruzici's 1st title of the year and the 17th of her career. It was Wade's only title of the year and the 15th of her career.
