= 1983 Italian Open – Women's doubles =

Women's doubles
- 1983 Italian Open
- 1982 Champions: (United States) Kathleen Horvath (South Africa) Yvonne Vermaak

Final
- Champions: (Romania) Virginia Ruzici (United Kingdom) Virginia Wade
- Runners-up: (Argentina) Ivanna Madruga-Osses (France) Catherine Tanvier
- Score: 6–3, 2–6, 6–1

Events
Singles	men	women
Doubles	men	women
← 1982 ·	Italian Open	· 1984 →

Kathleen Horvath and Yvonne Vermaak were the defending champions but lost in the semifinals to Ivanna Madruga-Osses and Catherine Tanvier.

Virginia Ruzici and Virginia Wade won in the final 6–3, 2–6, 6–1 against Madruga-Osses and Tanvier.

== Seeds ==
Champion seeds are indicated in bold text while text in italics indicates the round in which those seeds were eliminated.

1. (United Kingdom) Jo Durie / (United Kingdom) Anne Hobbs (quarterfinals)
2. (Argentina) Ivanna Madruga-Osses / (France) Catherine Tanvier (final)
3. (United States) Kathleen Horvath / (South Africa) Yvonne Vermaak (semifinals)
4. (Romania) **Virginia Ruzici** / (United Kingdom) **Virginia Wade (champions)**
5. (Australia) Evonne Goolagong Cawley / (United States) Paula Smith (quarterfinals)
6. (United States) Bonnie Gadusek / (Czechoslovakia) Helena Suková (quarterfinals)
7. (Czechoslovakia) Iva Budařová / (Czechoslovakia) Marcela Skuherská (semifinals)
8. (Australia) Chris O'Neil / (Australia) Pam Whytcross (second round)

== Draw ==
=== Key ===
- Q = Qualifier
- WC = Wild card
- LL = Lucky loser
- Alt = Alternate
- ITF = ITF entry
- PR = Protected ranking
- SR = Special ranking
- SE = Special exempt
- JE = Junior exempt
- JR = Junior Accelerator Programme entrant
- CO = College Accelerator Programme entrant
- NG = Next Gen Accelerator Program entrant
- w/o = Walkover
- r = Retired
- d = Defaulted

=== Final ===
Final
4	(Romania) **Virginia Ruzici** (United Kingdom) **Virginia Wade**	**6**	2	**6**
2	(Argentina) Ivanna Madruga-Osses (France) Catherine Tanvier	3	**6**	1

=== Top half ===
First round
1	(United Kingdom) **J Durie** (United Kingdom) **A Hobbs**	**6**	**6**
(United States) K Latham (United States) V Nelson	2	3
(Czechoslovakia) **Y Brzáková** (Czechoslovakia) **L Plchová**	**7**	**7**
(United Kingdom) S Barker (Czechoslovakia) R Tomanová	5	5
(United States) L Gordon (United States) S Solomon	**7**	2	6
(United States) **D Gilbert** (Czechoslovakia) **K Skronská**	5	**6**	**7**
(Brazil) P Medrado (Italy) S Simmonds	2	**6**	2
7	(Czechoslovakia) **I Budařová** (Czechoslovakia) **M Skuherská**	**6**	3	**6**
4	(Romania) **V Ruzici** (United Kingdom) **V Wade**	**6**	**6**
(United States) J Fuchs (United States) A Holton	4	2
(Italy) **A Canapi** (Argentina) **B Villaverde**	**6**	**6**
(United States) J Harrington (Peru) P Vásquez	2	2
(Sweden) C Jexell (Sweden) L Sandin	2	**6**	4
(Italy) **A Iuale** (Italy) **B Rossi**	**6**	2	**6**
(United States) P Fendick (United States) J Klitch	1	4
6	(United States) **B Gadusek** (Czechoslovakia) **H Suková**	**6**	**6**

Second round
1	(United Kingdom) **J Durie** (United Kingdom) **A Hobbs**	**6**	**7**
(Czechoslovakia) Y Brzáková (Czechoslovakia) L Plchová	0	5
(United States) D Gilbert (Czechoslovakia) K Skronská	1	1
7	(Czechoslovakia) **I Budařová** (Czechoslovakia) **M Skuherská**	**6**	**6**
4	(Romania) **V Ruzici** (United Kingdom) **V Wade**	**6**	**6**
(Italy) A Canapi (Argentina) B Villaverde	4	2
(Italy) A Iuale (Italy) B Rossi	1	1
6	(United States) **B Gadusek** (Czechoslovakia) **H Suková**	**6**	**6**

Quarterfinals
1	(United Kingdom) J Durie (United Kingdom) A Hobbs	**6**	5	4
7	(Czechoslovakia) **I Budařová** (Czechoslovakia) **M Skuherská**	2	**7**	**6**
4	(Romania) **V Ruzici** (United Kingdom) **V Wade**	3	**6**	**7**
6	(United States) B Gadusek (Czechoslovakia) H Suková	**6**	3	5

Semifinals
7	(Czechoslovakia) I Budařová (Czechoslovakia) M Skuherská	2	4
4	(Romania) **V Ruzici** (United Kingdom) **V Wade**	**6**	**6**

=== Bottom half ===
First round
8	(Australia) **C O'Neil** (Australia) **P Whytcross**	**6**	**6**
(United States) B Bramblett (Argentina) E Raponi-Longo	4	3
(United States) **L Bonder** (United States) **S Mascarin**	**6**	2	**6**
(Peru) L Arraya (United States) K Rinaldi	1	**6**	3
(Australia) A Minter (Australia) E Minter	2	0
(South Korea) **D-H Lee** (Romania) **L Romanov**	**6**	**6**
(West Germany) C Dries (Romania) M Romanov	1	4
3	(United States) **K Horvath** (South Africa) **Y Vermaak**	**6**	**6**
5	(Australia) **E Goolagong Cawley** (United States) **P Smith**	**6**	**6**
(Spain) C Perea (France) C Suire	2	2
(Italy) **S Cecchini** (Switzerland) **C Jolissaint**	**6**	**6**
(United States) P Casale (Italy) R Reggi	4	1
(United States) **S Collins** (Socialist Federal Republic of Yugoslavia) **M Jaušovec**	3	**6**	**6**
(Australia) B Remilton (Japan) H Sato	**6**	1	2
(South Africa) J Mundel (South Africa) R Uys	3	**6**	2
2	(Argentina) **I Madruga-Osses** (France) **C Tanvier**	**6**	4	**6**

Second round
8	(Australia) C O'Neil (Australia) P Whytcross	**6**	4	1
(United States) **L Bonder** (United States) **S Mascarin**	1	**6**	**6**
(South Korea) D-H Lee (Romania) L Romanov	**6**	2	3
3	(United States) **K Horvath** (South Africa) **Y Vermaak**	3	**6**	**6**
5	(Australia) **E Goolagong Cawley** (United States) **P Smith**	**6**	**7**
(Italy) S Cecchini (Switzerland) C Jolissaint	4	5
(United States) S Collins (Socialist Federal Republic of Yugoslavia) M Jaušovec	1	r
2	(Argentina) **I Madruga-Osses** (France) **C Tanvier**	**4**

Quarterfinals
(United States) L Bonder (United States) S Mascarin	4	1
3	(United States) **K Horvath** (South Africa) **Y Vermaak**	**6**	**6**
5	(Australia) E Goolagong Cawley (United States) P Smith	2	3
2	(Argentina) **I Madruga-Osses** (France) **C Tanvier**	**6**	**6**

Semifinals
3	(United States) K Horvath (South Africa) Y Vermaak	1	**7**	1
2	(Argentina) **I Madruga-Osses** (France) **C Tanvier**	**6**	5	**6**
