= 1974 Italian Open – Men's doubles =

Men's doubles
- 1974 Italian Open

Final
- Champion: (United States) Brian Gottfried (Mexico) Raúl Ramírez
- Runner-up: (Spain) Andrés Gimeno (Romania) Ilie Năstase
- Score: 6–3, 6–2, 6–3

Details
- Draw: 32
- Seeds: 4

Events
Singles	men	women
Doubles	men	women
- Italian Open

The 1974 Italian Open – Men's doubles was an event of the 1974 Italian Open tennis tournament and was played at the Foro Italico in Rome, Italy from 26 May through 3 June 1974. The draw comprised 32 teams of which four were seeded. John Newcombe and Tom Okker were the defending doubles champions but did not compete in this edition. Unseeded Brian Gottfried and Raúl Ramírez won the doubles title, defeating second-seeded Andrés Gimeno and Ilie Năstase in the final, 6–3, 6–2, 6–3.

== Seeds ==
1. (United States) Bob Lutz / (United States) Stan Smith (second round)
2. (Spain) Juan Gisbert Sr. / (Romania) Ilie Năstase (final)
3. (United States) Tom Gorman / (United States) Marty Riessen (semifinals)
4. (Sweden) Björn Borg / (Sweden) Ove Bengtson (second round)

== Draw ==
Key

- Q = Qualifier
- WC = Wild card
- LL = Lucky loser
- Alt = Alternate
- ITF = ITF entry
- PR = Protected ranking
- SR = Special ranking
- SE = Special exempt
- JE = Junior exempt
- JR = Junior Accelerator Programme entrant
- CO = College Accelerator Programme entrant
- NG = Next Gen Accelerator Program entrant
- w/o = Walkover
- r = Retired
- d = Defaulted

=== Finals ===
Semifinals
2	(Spain) Juan Gisbert Sr. (Romania) Ilie Năstase	1	6	6
3	(United States) Tom Gorman (United States) Marty Riessen	6	1	1
(United States) Brian Gottfried (Mexico) Raúl Ramírez	6	7
(West Germany) Jürgen Fassbender (West Germany) Hans-Jürgen Pohmann	4	6

Final
2	(Spain) Juan Gisbert Sr. (Romania) Ilie Năstase	3	2	3
(United States) Brian Gottfried (Mexico) Raúl Ramírez	6	6	6

=== Top half ===
First Round
2	(Spain) Juan Gisbert Sr. (Romania) Ilie Năstase	7	7
(Italy) Martin Mulligan (Italy) Nicola Pietrangeli	5	6
(United States) Jeff Borowiak (United States) Jim McManus	6	4	6
(United States) Eddie Dibbs (United States) Harold Solomon	2	6	3
(Chile) Patricio Cornejo (Chile) Jaime Fillol	6	7
(United States) Paul Gerken (United States) Roscoe Tanner	3	6
(Italy) Corrado Barazzutti (Italy) Tonino Zugarelli	6	6
(Argentina) Julián Ganzábal (United States) Steve Krulevitz	3	1
3	(United States) Tom Gorman (United States) Marty Riessen	6	6
(Czechoslovakia) Jiří Hřebec (Sweden) Kjell Johansson	3	3
(Australia) Dick Crealy (New Zealand) Onny Parun	7	6
(Italy) Ezio Di Matteo (Italy) Piero Toci	5	4
(United States) Charlie Pasarell (United States) Erik van Dillen	6	6
(Italy) Massimo Di Domenico (Italy) Fabrizio Matteoli	3	4
(Czechoslovakia) Jan Kodeš (Czechoslovakia) Vladimír Zedník	6	6
(Brazil) Thomaz Koch (Chile) Jaime Pinto Bravo	2	3

Second Round
2	(Spain) Juan Gisbert Sr. (Romania) Ilie Năstase	6	6
(United States) Jeff Borowiak (United States) Jim McManus	4	2
(Chile) Patricio Cornejo (Chile) Jaime Fillol	6	6
(Italy) Corrado Barazzutti (Italy) Tonino Zugarelli	3	1
3	(United States) Tom Gorman (United States) Marty Riessen	6	7
(Australia) Dick Crealy (New Zealand) Onny Parun	4	6
(United States) Charlie Pasarell (United States) Erik van Dillen	w/o
(Czechoslovakia) Jan Kodeš (Czechoslovakia) Vladimír Zedník

Quarterfinals
2	(Spain) Juan Gisbert Sr. (Romania) Ilie Năstase	5	7	6
(Chile) Patricio Cornejo (Chile) Jaime Fillol	7	6	3
3	(United States) Tom Gorman (United States) Marty Riessen	6	6
(United States) Charlie Pasarell (United States) Erik van Dillen	3	4

Semifinals
2	(Spain) Juan Gisbert Sr. (Romania) Ilie Năstase	1	6	6
3	(United States) Tom Gorman (United States) Marty Riessen	6	1	1

=== Bottom half ===
First Round
(France) Georges Goven (France) Patrick Proisy	6	6
(Austria) Hans Kary (Hungary) Balázs Taróczy	3	0
(Italy) Paolo Bertolucci (Italy) Adriano Panatta	6	6
(Soviet Union) Vladimir Korotkov (Soviet Union) Alexander Volkov	1	2
(United States) Brian Gottfried (Mexico) Raúl Ramírez	2	6	6
(Egypt) Ismail El Shafei (Socialist Federal Republic of Yugoslavia) Željko Franulović	6	4	2
(Australia) Colin Dibley (Colombia) Iván Molina	7	3	6
4	(Sweden) Björn Borg (Sweden) Ove Bengtson	6	6	7
(West Germany) Jürgen Fassbender (West Germany) Hans-Jürgen Pohmann	6	6
(Paraguay) Víctor Pecci (Argentina) Guillermo Vilas	2	0
(Italy) Vincenzo Franchitti (Italy) Pietro Marzano	6	3	6
(Soviet Union) Teimuraz Kakulia (Soviet Union) Alex Metreveli	3	6	4
(United States) Dick Dell (United States) Sherwood Stewart	7	6
(India) Vijay Amritraj (United States) Fred McNair	5	2
(Sweden) Leif Johansson (Sweden) Tenny Svensson	4	6	2
1	(United States) Bob Lutz (United States) Stan Smith	6	4	6

Second Round
(France) Georges Goven (France) Patrick Proisy	6	0
(Italy) Paolo Bertolucci (Italy) Adriano Panatta	7	6
(United States) Brian Gottfried (Mexico) Raúl Ramírez	7	6	6
4	(Sweden) Björn Borg (Sweden) Ove Bengtson	5	7	3
(West Germany) Jürgen Fassbender (West Germany) Hans-Jürgen Pohmann	6	6
(Italy) Vincenzo Franchitti (Italy) Pietro Marzano	1	2
(United States) Dick Dell (United States) Sherwood Stewart	6	4	6
1	(United States) Bob Lutz (United States) Stan Smith	2	6	3

Quarterfinals
(Italy) Paolo Bertolucci (Italy) Adriano Panatta	3	6
(United States) Brian Gottfried (Mexico) Raúl Ramírez	6	7
(West Germany) Jürgen Fassbender (West Germany) Hans-Jürgen Pohmann	4	6	6
(United States) Dick Dell (United States) Sherwood Stewart	6	3	2

Semifinals
(United States) Brian Gottfried (Mexico) Raúl Ramírez	6	7
(West Germany) Jürgen Fassbender (West Germany) Hans-Jürgen Pohmann	4	6
