= 1977 Italian Open (tennis) =

- Date: 16–22 May
- Edition: 34th
- Prize money: $125,000 (M) $35,000 (W)
- Surface: Clay / outdoor
- Location: Rome, Italy
- Venue: Foro Italico

Champions

Men's singles
- (United States) Vitas Gerulaitis

Women's singles
- (United States) Janet Newberry

Men's doubles
- (United States) Brian Gottfried / (Mexico) Raúl Ramírez

Women's doubles
- (South Africa) Brigitte Cuypers / (South Africa) Marise Kruger
← 1976 ·	Italian Open	· 1978 →

The 1977 Italian Open was a combined men's and women's tennis tournament that was played by men on outdoor clay courts at the Foro Italico in Rome, Italy. The men's tournament was part of the Colgate-Palmolive Grand Prix circuit while the women's tournament was part of the Colgate Series. The tournament was held from 16 May through 22 May 1977. The singles titles were won by eight-seeded Vitas Gerulaitis and fifth-seeded Janet Newberry who earned $21,000 and $6,000 first-prize money respectively. Gerulaitis competed despite being contracted to play for the Indiana Loves World Team Tennis (WTT) franchise and was fined $19,000 for failing to play Björn Borg in the weekend of the final.

== Finals ==
=== Men's singles ===
(United States) Vitas Gerulaitis defeated (Italy) Antonio Zugarelli 6–2, 7–6^{(7–2)}, 3–6, 7–6^{(7–5)}

- It was Gerulaitis' 2nd singles title of the year and the 5th of his career.

=== Women's singles ===
(United States) Janet Newberry defeated (Czechoslovakia) Renáta Tomanová 6–3, 7–6^{(7–5)}

- It was Newberry's only singles title of the year and the 2nd and last of her career.

=== Men's doubles ===
(United States) Brian Gottfried / (Mexico) Raúl Ramírez defeated (United States) Fred McNair / (United States) Sherwood Stewart 6–7, 7–6, 7–5

=== Women's doubles ===
(South Africa) Brigitte Cuypers / (South Africa) Marise Kruger defeated (United States) Bunny Bruning / (United States) Sharon Walsh 3–6, 7–5, 6–2
