= 1980 Italian Open (tennis) =

- Date: 19–25 May (M); 5–11 May (W)
- Edition: 37th
- Draw: 64S / 32D (M); 32S / 16D (W)
- Prize money: $200,000 (M) $100,000 (W)
- Surface: Clay / outdoor
- Location: Rome, Italy (M); Perugia, Italy (W)
- Venue: Foro Italico (M)

Champions

Men's singles
- (Argentina) Guillermo Vilas

Women's singles
- (United States) Chris Evert-Lloyd

Men's doubles
- (Australia) Mark Edmondson / (Australia) Kim Warwick

Women's doubles
- (Czechoslovakia) Hana Mandlíková / (Czechoslovakia) Renáta Tomanová
| ← 1979 · | Italian Open | · 1981 → |

The 1980 Italian Open was a combined men's and women's tennis tournament that was played on outdoor clay courts. For the first time in the history of the tournament the men and women competed in different locations. The men's event was held at the traditional location of Foro Italico in Rome, while the women played in Perugia. It was the 37th edition of the tournament. The men's tournament was part of the 1980 Volvo Grand Prix while the women's tournament was part of the Colgate Series (Category AA). The women's event was played from 5 May through 11 May 1980 while the men's event was organized from 19 May through 25 May 1980. First-seeded Guillermo Vilas, runner-up in 1976 and 1979, won the men's singles title and the accompanying $28,000 first-prize money. The women's singles title was won by first-seeded Chris Evert-Lloyd, her third Italian Open title after 1974 and 1975.

== Finals ==
=== Men's singles ===
(Argentina) Guillermo Vilas defeated (France) Yannick Noah 6–0, 6–4, 6–4

- It was Vilas' 1st singles title of the year and the 47th of his career.

=== Women's singles ===
(United States) Chris Evert-Lloyd defeated (Romania) Virginia Ruzici 5–7, 6–2, 6–2

- It was Evert-Lloyd's 1st singles title of the year and the 94th of her career.

=== Men's doubles ===
(Australia) Mark Edmondson / (Australia) Kim Warwick defeated (Hungary) Balázs Taróczy / (United States) Eliot Teltscher 7–6, 7–6

=== Women's doubles ===
(Czechoslovakia) Hana Mandlíková / (Czechoslovakia) Renáta Tomanová defeated (Argentina) Ivanna Madruga / (Argentina) Adriana Villagrán 6–4, 6–4
