= 1974 Italian Open (tennis) =

- Date: 26 May – 3 June
- Edition: 31st
- Category: Grand Prix (AA)
- Draw: 64S/32D (men); 44S/22D (women)
- Prize money: $90,000
- Surface: Clay court / outdoor
- Location: Rome, Italy
- Venue: Foro Italico

Champions

Men's singles
- (Sweden) Björn Borg

Women's singles
- (United States) Chris Evert

Men's doubles
- (United States) Brian Gottfried / (Mexico) Raúl Ramírez

Women's doubles
- (United States) Chris Evert / (Soviet Union) Olga Morozova
← 1973 ·	Italian Open	· 1975 →

The 1974 Italian Open was a combined men's and women's tennis tournament that was played by men on outdoor clay courts at the Foro Italico in Rome, Italy. The men's tournament was part of the 1974 Commercial Union Assurance Grand Prix circuit while the women's tournament was part of the Women's International Grand Prix circuit. The tournament was held from 26 May through 3 June 1974. The singles titles were won by third-seeded Björn Borg and first-seeded Chris Evert.

World no. 2 Jimmy Connors and Evonne Goolagong were banned from playing in the 1974 Italian Open by Philippe Chatrier, president of the French Tennis Federation (FTF), because both had signed contracts to play in the World Team Tennis league in the United States. The initial rounds in the men's event were played as best-of-three-set matches while the semifinal and final were played as best-of-five-set. Second-seeded Jan Kodeš was disqualified during his second round match against Tonino Zugarelli when he pushed referee Brunetti during an argument over a disputed line call. Borg's semifinal match against Guillermo Vilas was stopped at 1–1 in the final set due to darkness and was finished the next day. Borg won and had to follow up by playing the final against titleholder Ilie Năstase only two hours later.

== Finals ==
=== Men's singles ===
(Sweden) Björn Borg defeated (Romania) Ilie Năstase 6–3, 6–4, 6–2

- It was Borg's 4th singles title of the year and of his career.

=== Women's singles ===
(United States) Chris Evert defeated (Czechoslovakia) Martina Navratilova 6–3, 6–3

=== Men's doubles ===
(United States) Brian Gottfried / (Mexico) Raúl Ramírez defeated (Spain) Juan Gisbert / (Romania) Ilie Năstase 6–3, 6–2, 6–3

=== Women's doubles ===
(United States) Chris Evert / (Soviet Union) Olga Morozova defeated (West Germany) Helga Masthoff / (West Germany) Heide Orth w.o. (Note: Masthoff retired before the final due to an injured knee.)
