= 1969 Italian Open (tennis) =

- Date: 21–28 April
- Edition: 26th
- Category: Non-tour
- Draw: 128MS/32WS/32MD
- Prize money: $14,600
- Surface: Clay court / outdoor
- Location: Rome, Italy
- Venue: Foro Italico

Champions

Men's singles
- (Australia) John Newcombe

Women's singles
- (United States) Julie Heldman

Men's doubles
- No winners

Women's doubles
- (France) Françoise Dürr / (United Kingdom) Ann Haydon-Jones
← 1968 ·	Italian Open	· 1970 →

The 1969 Italian Open was a combined men's and women's tennis tournament that was played on outdoor clay courts at the Foro Italico in Rome, Italy. It was the 26th edition of the tournament and the first that was open to amateur and professional players. (Note: The 1968 edition was the first held in the open era of tennis, which started in April 1968, but was not yet declared open by the Italian tennis federation.) The event was held from 21 April through 28 April 1969 and finished a day late. The singles titles were won by second-seeded John Newcombe and Julie Heldman, the first American female player to win the title in 13 years.

== Finals ==
=== Men's singles ===
(Australia) John Newcombe defeated (Australia) Tony Roche 6–3, 4–6, 6–2, 5–7, 6–3

=== Women's singles ===
(United States) Julie Heldman defeated (Australia) Kerry Melville 7–5, 6–3

=== Men's doubles ===
(Netherlands) Tom Okker / (United States) Marty Riessen shared the title with (Australia) John Newcombe / (Australia) Tony Roche 4–6, 6–1, susp (Note: Match was suspended due to darkness)

=== Women's doubles ===
(France) Françoise Dürr / (United Kingdom) Ann Haydon-Jones defeated (United States) Rosemary Casals / (United States) Billie Jean King 6–3, 3–6, 6–2
