= 1978 Italian Open (tennis) =

Tennis tournament

- Date: 22–28 May
- Edition: 35th
- Draw: 64S / 32D (M); 32/S / 16D (W)
- Prize money: $175,000 (M) $35,000 (W)
- Surface: Clay / outdoor
- Location: Rome, Italy
- Venue: Foro Italico

Champions

Men's singles
- (Sweden) Björn Borg

Women's singles
- (Czechoslovakia) Regina Maršíková

Men's doubles
- (Paraguay) Víctor Pecci / (Chile) Belus Prajoux

Women's doubles
- (Socialist Federal Republic of Yugoslavia) Mima Jaušovec / (Romania) Virginia Ruzici
← 1977 ·	Italian Open	· 1979 →

The 1978 Italian Open was a combined men's and women's tennis tournament that was played by men on outdoor clay courts at the Foro Italico in Rome, Italy. The men's tournament was part of the 1978 Colgate-Palmolive Grand Prix while the women's tournament was part of the Colgate International Series (Category A). It was the 35th edition of the tournament and was held from 22 May through 28 May 1978. The singles titles were won by first-seeded Björn Borg, who won his second Italian Open title after 1974, and third-seeded Regina Maršíková.

== Finals ==
=== Men's singles ===
(Sweden) Björn Borg defeated (Italy) Adriano Panatta 1–6, 6–3, 6–1, 4–6, 6–3

- It was Borg's 5th singles title of the year and the 35th of his career.

=== Women's singles ===
(Czechoslovakia) Regina Maršíková defeated (Romania) Virginia Ruzici 7–5, 7–5

- It was Maršíková's 2nd singles title of the year and the 4th of her career.

=== Men's doubles ===
(Paraguay) Víctor Pecci / (Chile) Belus Prajoux defeated (Czechoslovakia) Jan Kodeš / (Czechoslovakia) Tomáš Šmíd 6–7, 7–6, 6–1

=== Women's doubles ===
(Socialist Federal Republic of Yugoslavia) Mima Jaušovec / (Romania) Virginia Ruzici defeated (Romania) Florența Mihai / (United States) Betsy Nagelsen 6–2, 2–6, 7–6

== Prize money ==
Event	W	F	SF	QF	Third round	Second round	First round	Total
Men's singles	$23,992	$12,005	$6,597	$3,552	$2,205	$1,172	$595	$118,842
Women's singles	$6,000	$3,000	$1,550	$900	—	$600	$150	$26,250
Men's doubles	$8,995	$4,497	$2,345	$1,190	—	$542	$157	$29,802
Women's doubles	$2,000	$1,100	$550	$300	—	—	$150	$6,600

Source: World of Tennis 1979
