= 1979 Italian Open (tennis) =

- Date: 21–27 May (M); 7–13 May (W)
- Edition: 36th
- Draw: 64S / 32D (M); 32/S / 16D (W)
- Prize money: $175,000 (M) $100,000 (W)
- Surface: Clay / outdoor
- Location: Rome, Italy
- Venue: Foro Italico

Champions

Men's singles
- (United States) Vitas Gerulaitis

Women's singles
- (United States) Tracy Austin

Men's doubles
- (United States) Peter Fleming / (Czechoslovakia) Tomáš Šmíd

Women's doubles
- (Netherlands) Betty Stöve / (Australia) Wendy Turnbull
← 1978 ·	Italian Open	· 1980 →

The 1979 Italian Open was a combined men's and women's tennis tournament that was played on outdoor clay courts at the Foro Italico in Rome, Italy. It was the 36th edition of the tournament. The men's tournament was part of the 1979 Colgate-Palmolive Grand Prix while the women's tournament, held separately for the first time, was part of the Colgate Series (Category AAA). The women's event was played from 7 May through 13 May 1979 while the men's event was organized from 21 May through 27 May 1979. After a final that lasted five hours and nine minutes second-seeded Vitas Gerulaitis won the men's singles title, his second Italian Open title after 1977, and the accompanying $28,000 first-prize money. The women's singles title was won by third-seeded Tracy Austin. In the semifinal Austin defeated compatriot Chris Evert-Lloyd which ended Evert-Lloyd's record 125-match winning streak on clay that had started in August 1973.

== Finals ==
=== Men's singles ===
(United States) Vitas Gerulaitis defeated (Argentina) Guillermo Vilas 6–7^{(4–7)}, 7–6^{(7–0)}, 6–7^{(5–7)}, 6–4, 6–2

- It was Gerulaitis' 2nd singles title of the year and the 13th of his career.

=== Women's singles ===
(United States) Tracy Austin defeated (West Germany) Sylvia Hanika 6–4, 1–6, 6–3

- It was Austin's 3rd singles title of the year and the 6th of her career.

=== Men's doubles ===
(United States) Peter Fleming / (Czechoslovakia) Tomáš Šmíd defeated (Argentina) José Luis Clerc / (Romania) Ilie Năstase 4–6, 6–1, 7–5

=== Women's doubles ===
(Netherlands) Betty Stöve / (Australia) Wendy Turnbull defeated (Australia) Evonne Goolagong / (Australia) Kerry Reid 6–3, 6–4
