= 1973 Italian Open (tennis) =

- Date: 2–10 June
- Edition: 30th
- Category: Grand Prix circuit
- Surface: Clay court / outdoor
- Location: Rome, Italy
- Venue: Foro Italico

Champions

Men's singles
- (Romania) Ilie Năstase

Women's singles
- (Australia) Evonne Goolagong

Men's doubles
- (Australia) John Newcombe / (Netherlands) Tom Okker

Women's doubles
- (United Kingdom) Virginia Wade / (Soviet Union) Olga Morozova
← 1972 ·	Italian Open	· 1974 →

The 1973 Italian Open was a combined men's and women's tennis tournament that was played by men on outdoor clay courts at the Foro Italico in Rome, Italy. The men's and women's tournament were part of the 1973 Commercial Union Assurance Grand Prix. It was the 30th edition of the tournament and was held from 2 June through 10 June 1973. The singles titles were won by Ilie Năstase and Evonne Goolagong.

== Finals ==
=== Men's singles ===
(Romania) Ilie Năstase defeated (Spain) Manuel Orantes 6–1, 6–1, 6–1

=== Women's singles ===
(Australia) Evonne Goolagong defeated (United States) Chris Evert 7–6, 6–0

=== Men's doubles ===
(Australia) John Newcombe / (Netherlands) Tom Okker defeated (Australia) Ross Case / (Australia) Geoff Masters 6–3, 6–2, 6–4

=== Women's doubles ===
(United Kingdom) Virginia Wade / (Soviet Union) Olga Morozova defeated (Czechoslovakia) Renáta Tomanová / (Czechoslovakia) Martina Navratilova 3–6, 6–2, 7–5
