= 1975 Italian Open (tennis) =

Combined men's and women's tennis tournament

- Date: 26 May – 3 June
- Edition: 32nd
- Category: Grand Prix circuit
- Surface: Clay court / outdoor
- Location: Rome, Italy
- Venue: Foro Italico

Champions

Men's singles
- (Mexico) Raúl Ramírez

Women's singles
- (United States) Chris Evert

Men's doubles
- (United States) Brian Gottfried / (Mexico) Raúl Ramírez

Women's doubles
- (United States) Chris Evert / (Czechoslovakia) Martina Navratilova
← 1974 ·	Italian Open	· 1976 →

The 1975 Italian Open was a combined men's and women's tennis tournament that was played by men on outdoor clay courts at the Foro Italico in Rome, Italy. The men's and women's tournament was part of the 1975 Commercial Union Assurance Grand Prix. It was the 32nd edition of the tournament and was held from 26 May through 3 June 1975. The singles titles were won by Raúl Ramírez and Chris Evert.

== Finals ==
=== Men's singles ===
(Mexico) Raúl Ramírez defeated (Spain) Manuel Orantes 7–6, 7–5, 7–5

- It was Ramírez's 3rd singles title of the year and the 6th of his career.

=== Women's singles ===
(United States) Chris Evert defeated (Czechoslovakia) Martina Navratilova 6–1, 6–0

- It was Evert's 7th singles title of the year and the 46th of her career.

=== Men's doubles ===
(United States) Brian Gottfried / (Mexico) Raúl Ramírez defeated (United States) Jimmy Connors / (Romania) Ilie Năstase 6–4, 7–6, 2–6, 6–1

=== Women's doubles ===
(United States) Chris Evert / (Czechoslovakia) Martina Navratilova defeated (United Kingdom) Sue Barker / (United Kingdom) Glynis Coles 6–1, 6–2

== Prize money ==
Event	W	F	SF	QF	Third round	Second round	First round
Men's singles	$16,000	$8,000	$4,000	$2,000	$1,300	$800	$300
Women's singles	$5,000	$2,500	$1,250	$800	$500	$350	$200
Men's doubles	$6,000	$3,500	$2,000	$800	—	$0	$0
Women's doubles	$1,500	$900	$500	$300	—	—	$0

Source: World of Tennis '76

== See also ==
- Evert–Navratilova rivalry
