= 1976 Swedish Open =

- Date: 4–11 July
- Edition: 29th
- Category: Grand Prix (Three star)
- Draw: 64S / 32D
- Prize money: $100,000
- Surface: Clay / outdoor
- Location: Båstad, Sweden

Champions

Singles
- (Italy) Tonino Zugarelli

Doubles
- (United States) Fred McNair / (United States) Sherwood Stewart
- Swedish Open

The 1976 Swedish Open was a men's tennis tournament played on outdoor clay courts held in Båstad, Sweden. It was a Three Star category tournament and part of the Grand Prix circuit. It was the 29th edition of the tournament and was held from 4 July through 11 July 1976. Unseeded Tonino Zugarelli won the singles title.

== Finals ==
=== Singles ===
(Italy) Tonino Zugarelli defeated (Italy) Corrado Barazzutti 4–6, 7–5, 6–2

=== Doubles ===
(United States) Fred McNair / (United States) Sherwood Stewart defeated (Poland) Wojciech Fibak / (Spain) Juan Gisbert 6–3, 6–4
