= 1970 Italian Open (tennis) =

- Date: 20–27 April
- Edition: 27th
- Category: Independent tour
- Surface: Clay court / outdoor
- Location: Rome, Italy
- Venue: Foro Italico

Champions

Men's singles
- (Romania) Ilie Năstase

Women's singles
- (United States) Billie Jean King

Men's doubles
- (Romania) Ilie Năstase / (Romania) Ion Țiriac

Women's doubles
- (United States) Billie Jean King / (United States) Rosie Casals
- Italian Open

The 1970 Italian Open also known as the Italian Open Championships was a combined men's and women's tennis tournament that was played on outdoor clay courts at the Foro Italico in Rome, Italy. The men's tournament was initially part of the Grand Prix circuit but was withdrawn during the tournament when it became known that the organizers had paid management fees to the competing World Championship Tennis (WCT) organization in order for the WCT players to participate. The women's tournament was a non-tour event, i.e. not part of the Virginia Slims Circuit. The tournament was held from 20 April through 27 April 1970. The singles titles were won by Ilie Năstase and Billie Jean King.

== Finals ==
=== Men's singles ===
(Romania) Ilie Năstase defeated (Czechoslovakia) Jan Kodeš 6–3, 1–6, 6–3, 8–6

=== Women's singles ===
(United States) Billie Jean King defeated (United States) Julie Heldman 6–1, 6–3 (Note: Both players survived matchpoints in their semifinal matches against Virginia Wade and Pat Walkden respectively.)

=== Men's doubles ===
(Romania) Ilie Năstase / (Romania) Ion Țiriac defeated (Australia) William Bowrey / (Australia) Owen Davidson 0–6, 10–8, 6–3, 6–8, 6–1

=== Women's doubles ===
(United States) Billie Jean King / (United States) Rosie Casals defeated (France) Françoise Dürr / (United Kingdom) Virginia Wade 6–2, 3–6, 9–7
