= Andrea Temesvári =

Hungarian tennis player

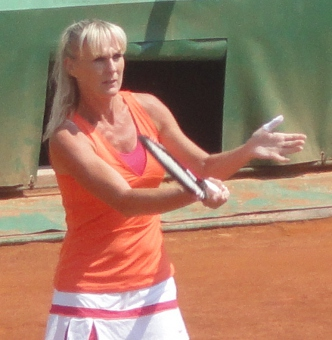
- French Open 2011 - Trophée des Légendes
- Country (sports): Hungary
- Born: 26 April 1966 (age 60) Budapest
- Height: 1.82 m (6 ft 0 in)
- Turned pro: 1981
- Retired: 1997
- Plays: Right-handed (two-handed backhand)
- Prize money: $1,162,635

Singles
- Career record: 241–210
- Career titles: 5
- Highest ranking: No. 7 (23 January 1984)

Grand Slam singles results
- Australian Open: 3R (1984, 1989)
- French Open: 4R (1983)
- Wimbledon: 4R (1984)
- US Open: 3R (1982, 1983, 1984, 1989)

Doubles
- Career record: 211–171
- Career titles: 7
- Highest ranking: No. 13 (21 December 1986)

Grand Slam doubles results
- Australian Open: SF (1990)
- French Open: W (1986)
- Wimbledon: QF (1985, 1989)
- US Open: 3R (1983, 1984, 1986)

Andrea Temesvári (born 26 April 1966) is a Hungarian former professional tennis player. She won the Italian Open at age 16, and injuries later hampered her career.

Born in Budapest, Temesvári began playing tennis at age 9. She was coached by her father Otto Temesvári and Ferenc Polyak.

== Career ==
She joined the WTA Tour in 1981 and won the Most Improved Player Award by the WTA Tour and TENNIS Magazine in 1982. Temesvári reached a career-high of world No. 7 in 1983. She fell out of the top 25 in 1986. At the 1986 French Open, she won the doubles title with Martina Navratilova.

She returned to the tour 1989 after a 20-month layoff due to ankle and shoulder injuries. She had two operations on ankle in March and September 1987 and then arthroscopic surgery on right shoulder in April 1988. She played for the Hungary Fed Cup team from 1983 to 1986, 1989 to 1990, and 1992. She was also a member of the Hungarian Olympic team in 1996. She retired in 1997.

During her career, she won a total of five singles titles and seven doubles titles.

== Grand Slam finals ==
=== Doubles: 1 (title) ===
Result	Year	Tournament	Surface	Partner	Opponents	Score
Win	1986	French Open	Clay	(United States) Martina Navratilova	(West Germany) Steffi Graf (Argentina) Gabriela Sabatini	6–1, 6–2

== WTA career finals ==
=== Singles: 7 (5 titles, 2 runner-ups) ===
Winner — Legend Grand Slam tournaments WTA Tour Championships Tier I (0–0) Tier II (0–0) Tier III (0–0) Tier IV (0–1) Tier V (0–0) Virginia Slims, Avon, other (5–1)	Finals by surface Hard (1–1) Grass (0–0) Clay (4–1) Carpet (0–0)

Result	W/L	Date	Tournament	Surface	Opponent	Score
Win	1–0	March 1982	Hershey, U.S.	Hard (i)	(France) Catherine Tanvier	6–4, 6–2
Loss	1–1	May 1982	Lugano, Switzerland	Clay	(United States) Chris Evert-Lloyd	0–6, 3–6
Win	2–1	May 1983	Perugia, Italy	Clay	(United States) Bonnie Gadusek	6–1, 6–0
Win	3–1	July 1983	Hittfeld, West Germany	Clay	(West Germany) Eva Pfaff	6–4, 6–2
Win	4–1	August 1983	Indianapolis, U.S.	Clay	(United States) Zina Garrison	6–2, 6–2
Win	5–1	July 1985	Indianapolis, US	Clay	(United States) Zina Garrison	7–6^{(7–0)}, 6–3
Loss	5–2	August 1989	Mahwah, U.S.	Hard	(West Germany) Steffi Graf	5–7, 2–6

=== Doubles: 10 (7 titles, 3 runner-ups) ===
Winner — Legend Grand Slam tournaments (1–0) WTA Tour Championships (0–0) Tier I (0–0) Tier II (0–2) Tier III (1–0) Tier IV (2–0) Tier V (0–0) Virginia Slims, Avon, other (3–1)	Finals by surface Hard (0–0) Grass (0–0) Clay (5–2) Carpet (2–1)

Result	W/L	Date	Tournament	Surface	Partner	Opponents	Score
Win	1–0	October 1984	Zürich, Switzerland	Carpet (i)	(United States) Andrea Leand	(West Germany) Claudia Kohde-Kilsch (Czechoslovakia) Hana Mandlíková	6–1, 6–3
Win	2–0	October 1985	Zürich, Switzerland	Carpet (i)	(Czechoslovakia) Hana Mandlíková	(West Germany) Claudia Kohde-Kilsch (Czechoslovakia) Helena Suková	6–4, 3–6, 7–5
Win	3–0	March 1986	Marco Island, U.S.	Clay	(United States) Martina Navratilova	(United States) Kathy Jordan (United States) Elise Burgin	7–5, 6–2
Loss	3–1	May 1986	Berlin, West Germany	Clay	(United States) Martina Navratilova	(West Germany) Steffi Graf (Czechoslovakia) Helena Suková	5–7, 2–6
Win	4–1	May 1986	French Open	Clay	(United States) Martina Navratilova	(West Germany) Steffi Graf (Argentina) Gabriela Sabatini	6–1, 6–2
Win	5–1	April 1989	Tampa, U.S.	Clay	(Netherlands) Brenda Schultz	(United States) Elise Burgin (South Africa) Rosalyn Fairbank	7–6^{(8–6)}, 6–4
Loss	5–2	April 1990	Amelia Island, U.S.	Clay	(Czechoslovakia) Regina Rajchrtová	(Argentina) Mercedes Paz (Spain) Arantxa Sánchez Vicario	6–7^{(5–7)}, 4–6
Win	6–2	May 1993	Strasbourg, France	Clay	(United States) Shaun Stafford	(Canada) Jill Hetherington (United States) Kathy Rinaldi	6–7^{(5–7)}, 6–3, 6–4
Loss	6–3	February 1994	Paris, France	Carpet (i)	(France) Mary Pierce	(Belgium) Sabine Appelmans (Belgium) Laurence Courtois	4–6, 4–6
Win	7–3	July 1995	Maria Lankowitz, Austria	Clay	(Italy) Silvia Farina Elia	(France) Alexandra Fusai (Germany) Wiltrud Probst	6–2, 6–2

== ITF finals ==
Legend
$75,000 tournaments
$50,000 tournaments
$25,000 tournaments
$10,000 tournaments

=== Singles (3–2) ===
Result	No.	Date	Tournament	Surface	Opponent	Score
Loss	1.	12 April 1981	Nice, France	Clay	(France) Gail Lovera	2–6, 1–6
Loss	2.	30 August 1981	Stuttgart, West Germany	Clay	(Italy) Sabina Simmonds	3–6, 5–7
Win	3.	6 September 1981	Bad Hersfeld, West Germany	Clay	(West Germany) Helga Lütten	4–6, 6–0, 6–4
Win	4.	15 May 1994	Budapest, Hungary	Clay	(Slovenia) Barbara Mulej	6–4, 6–1
Win	5.	24 April 1995	Budapest, Hungary	Clay	(Czech Republic) Lenka Němečková	6–4, 3–6, 6–4

=== Doubles (4–1) ===
Result	No.	Date	Tournament	Surface	Partner	Opponents	Score
Win	1.	10 June 1991	Érd, Hungary	Clay	(Hungary) Virág Csurgó	(Czechoslovakia) Petra Holubová (Czechoslovakia) Markéta Štusková	6–1, 7–5
Loss	2.	15 May 1994	Budapest, Hungary	Clay	(Hungary) Virág Csurgó	(Czech Republic) Eva Melicharová (Czech Republic) Helena Vildová	2–6, 4–6
Win	3.	27 February 1995	Southampton, England	Carpet (i)	(Belgium) Dominique Monami	(Netherlands) Seda Noorlander (Greece) Christína Papadáki	6–4, 6–2
Win	4.	2 September 1996	Bratislava, Slovakia	Clay	(Slovakia) Denisa Krajčovičová	(Czech Republic) Petra Langrová (Slovakia) Radka Zrubáková	0–6, 6–3, 6–3
Win	5.	2 February 1997	Prostějov, Czech Republic	Carpet (i)	(Slovakia) Denisa Krajčovičová	(Poland) Aleksandra Olsza (Ukraine) Elena Tatarkova	6–2, 6–3

== Grand Slam singles performance timeline ==
Key
W	F	SF	QF	#R	RR	Q#	DNQ	A	NH

(W) winner; (F) finalist; (SF) semifinalist; (QF) quarterfinalist; (#R) rounds 4, 3, 2, 1; (RR) round-robin stage; (Q#) qualification round; (DNQ) did not qualify; (A) absent; (NH) not held; (SR) strike rate (events won / competed); (W–L) win–loss record.

Tournament	1981	1982	1983	1984	1985	1986	1987	1988	1989	1990	1991	1992	1993	1994	1995	1996	1997	W–L
Australian Open	A	A	A	3R	A	NH	A	A	3R	2R	A	A	2R	A	A	1R	A	6–5
French Open	1R	3R	4R	2R	1R	2R	A	A	2R	3R	2R	A	1R	A	1R	2R	A	12–12
Wimbledon	A	3R	3R	4R	2R	A	A	A	1R	1R	1R	A	1R	A	2R	A	A	9–9
US Open	A	3R	3R	3R	2R	2R	A	A	3R	1R	1R	1R	A	1R	1R	A	A	10–11
GS win–loss	0–1	6–3	7–3	8–4	2–3	2–2	0–0	0–0	5–4	3–4	1–3	0–1	1–3	0–1	1–3	1–2	0–0	37–37
Year-end ranking	146	33	10	14	16	43	NR	NR	43	116	157	71	153	132	90	181	942	

Awards
Preceded by Pálma Balogh	Hungarian Sportswoman of The Year; 1983	Succeeded by Mária Ábrahám
Preceded by Sabina Simmonds	WTA Most Improved Player; 1983	Succeeded by Kathy Jordan
