= 1981 Italian Open (tennis) =

- Date: 18–24 May (M); 4–10 May (W)
- Edition: 38th
- Draw: 64S / 32D (M); 32S / 16D (W)
- Prize money: $200,000 (M) $100,000 (W)
- Surface: Clay / outdoor
- Location: Rome, Italy (M); Perugia, Italy (W)
- Venue: Foro Italico (M)

Champions

Men's singles
- (Argentina) José Luis Clerc

Women's singles
- (United States) Chris Evert-Lloyd

Men's doubles
- (Chile) Hans Gildemeister / (Ecuador) Andrés Gómez

Women's doubles
- (United States) Candy Reynolds / (United States) Paula Smith
- Italian Open

The 1981 Italian Open was a combined men's and women's tennis tournament that was played on outdoor clay courts. For the second time in the history of the tournament the men and women competed in different locations. The men's event was held at the traditional location of Foro Italico in Rome, while the women played in Perugia. It was the 38th edition of the tournament. The men's tournament was part of the 1981 Volvo Grand Prix while the women's tournament was part of the Toyota Series (Category 3). The women's event was played from 4 May through 10 May 1981 while the men's event was organized from 18 May through 24 May 1981. Third-seeded José Luis Clerc won the men's singles title and the accompanying $24,000 first-prize money. The women's singles title was won by first-seeded Chris Evert-Lloyd, her fourth Italian Open title after 1974, 1975 and 1980.

== Finals ==
=== Men's singles ===
(Argentina) José Luis Clerc defeated (Paraguay) Víctor Pecci 6–3, 6–4, 6–0

- It was Clerc's 2nd singles title of the year and the 12th of his career.

=== Women's singles ===
(United States) Chris Evert-Lloyd defeated (Romania) Virginia Ruzici 6–1, 6–2

- It was Evert-Lloyd's 5th singles title of the year and the 106th of her career.

=== Men's doubles ===
(Chile) Hans Gildemeister / (Ecuador) Andrés Gómez defeated (United States) Bruce Manson / (Czechoslovakia) Tomáš Šmíd 7–5, 6–2

=== Women's doubles ===
(United States) Candy Reynolds / (United States) Paula Smith defeated (United States) Chris Evert-Lloyd / (Romania) Virginia Ruzici 7–5, 6–1
