= 1972 Italian Open (tennis) =

- Date: 24 April – 2 May
- Edition: 29th
- Category: Grand Prix circuit
- Surface: Clay court / outdoor
- Location: Rome, Italy
- Venue: Foro Italico

Champions

Men's singles
- (Spain) Manuel Orantes

Women's singles
- (United States) Linda Tuero

Men's doubles
- (Romania) Ilie Năstase / (Romania) Ion Țiriac

Women's doubles
- (Australia) Lesley Hunt / (Soviet Union) Olga Morozova
- Italian Open

The 1972 Italian Open was a combined men's and women's tennis tournament that was played by men on outdoor clay courts at the Foro Italico in Rome, Italy. The men's and women's tournament were part of the 1972 Commercial Union Assurance Grand Prix. It was the 29th edition of the tournament and was held from 24 April through 2 May 1972. The singles titles were won by Manuel Orantes and Linda Tuero.

== Finals ==
=== Men's singles ===
(Spain) Manuel Orantes defeated (Czechoslovakia) Jan Kodeš 4–6, 6–1, 7–5, 6–2

=== Women's singles ===
(United States) Linda Tuero defeated (Soviet Union) Olga Morozova 6–4, 6–3

=== Men's doubles ===
(Romania) Ilie Năstase / (Romania) Ion Țiriac defeated (Australia) Lew Hoad / (South Africa) Frew McMillan 3–6, 3–6, 6–4, 6–3, 5–3, ret.

=== Women's doubles ===
(Australia) Lesley Hunt / (Soviet Union) Olga Morozova defeated (France) Gail Chanfreau / (Italy) Rosalba Vido 6–3, 6–4
