= 1976 Italian Open (tennis) =

- Date: 23–30 May
- Edition: 33rd
- Draw: 64MS/64WS/32MD/16WD
- Surface: Clay court / outdoor
- Location: Rome, Italy
- Venue: Foro Italico

Champions

Men's singles
- (Italy) Adriano Panatta

Women's singles
- (Socialist Federal Republic of Yugoslavia) Mima Jaušovec

Men's doubles
- (United States) Brian Gottfried / (Mexico) Raúl Ramírez

Women's doubles
- (South Africa) Linky Boshoff / (South Africa) Ilana Kloss
- Italian Open

The 1976 Italian Open was a combined men's and women's tennis tournament that was played by men on outdoor clay courts at the Foro Italico in Rome, Italy. The men's tournament was part of the 1976 Commercial Union Assurance Grand Prix while the women's tournament was part of the 1976 Virginia Slims World Championship Series. The tournament was held from 23 May until 30 May 1976. The singles titles were won by Third-seeded Adriano Panatta and Mima Jaušovec. In his first-round match Panatta survived 11 match points against Kim Warwick.

== Finals ==
=== Men's singles ===
(Italy) Adriano Panatta defeated (Argentina) Guillermo Vilas 2–6, 7–6, 6–2, 7–6

=== Women's singles ===
(Socialist Federal Republic of Yugoslavia) Mima Jaušovec defeated (Australia) Lesley Hunt 6–1, 6–3

=== Men's doubles ===
(United States) Brian Gottfried / (Mexico) Raúl Ramírez defeated (Australia) Geoff Masters / (Australia) John Newcombe 7–6, 5–7, 6–3, 3–6, 6–3 (Note: The final was stopped at two sets all due to bad light and the final set was played on 15 September during the Grow Professional doubles Championship in The Woodlands, TX, USA.)

=== Women's doubles ===
(South Africa) Linky Boshoff / (South Africa) Ilana Kloss defeated (Romania) Virginia Ruzici / (Romania) Mariana Simionescu 6–1, 6–2

== Prize money ==
Event	W	F	SF	QF	Third round	Second round	First round	Total
Men's singles	$30,000	$13,000	$6,500	$3,400	$1,700	$1,000	$500	$115,200
Women's singles	$5,000	$2,500	$1,250	$800	$500	$350	$200	$26,000
Men's doubles	$6,000	$3,500	$2,000	$800	—N/a	$0	$0	$16,700
Women's doubles	$1,500	$900	$500	$300	—N/a	—N/a	$0	$4,600

Source: World of Tennis 1977
