= Cornelia Dries =

German former professional tennis player

- Country (sports): West Germany
- Born: 4 March 1961 (age 65) Düsseldorf, West Germany
- Prize money: US$ 14,022

Grand Slam singles results
- French Open: 2R (1982)
- Wimbledon: 1R (1983)

Grand Slam doubles results
- French Open: 1R (1983)
Medal record
Representing West Germany
Summer Universiade
Silver medal – second place	1983 Edmonton	Mixed doubles

Cornelia Dries (born 4 March 1961) is a former German professional tennis player.

Born in Düsseldorf, Dries competed on the professional tour in the 1980s.

As a qualifier into the main draw of the 1982 French Open, she made it through to the second round, with a win over Rosalyn Fairbank.

Dries won a silver medal for West Germany at the 1983 Summer Universiade in Edmonton, partnering with Jochen Settelmeyer.
