= Italian Open (tennis) =

Coordinates: 41°55′45.20″N 12°27′21.46″E

Italian Open Internazionali BNL d'Italia

Tournament information
- Founded: 1930; 96 years ago
- Editions: 83 (2026)
- Location: Rome; Italy
- Venue: Foro Italico
- Surface: Clay (outdoors)
- Website: www.internazionalibnlditalia.com

Current champions (2026)
- Men's singles: (Italy) Jannik Sinner
- Women's singles: (Ukraine) Elina Svitolina
- Men's doubles: (Italy) Simone Bolelli (Italy) Andrea Vavassori
- Women's doubles: Mirra Andreeva; Diana Shnaider
ATP Tour
- Category: ATP 1000 (1990–current); Grand Prix tennis circuit (1972–89)
- Draw: 96S / 48Q / 32D
- Prize money: €8,235,540 (2026)
WTA Tour
- Category: WTA 1000
- Draw: 96S / 48Q / 32D
- Prize money: €7,228,080 (2026)

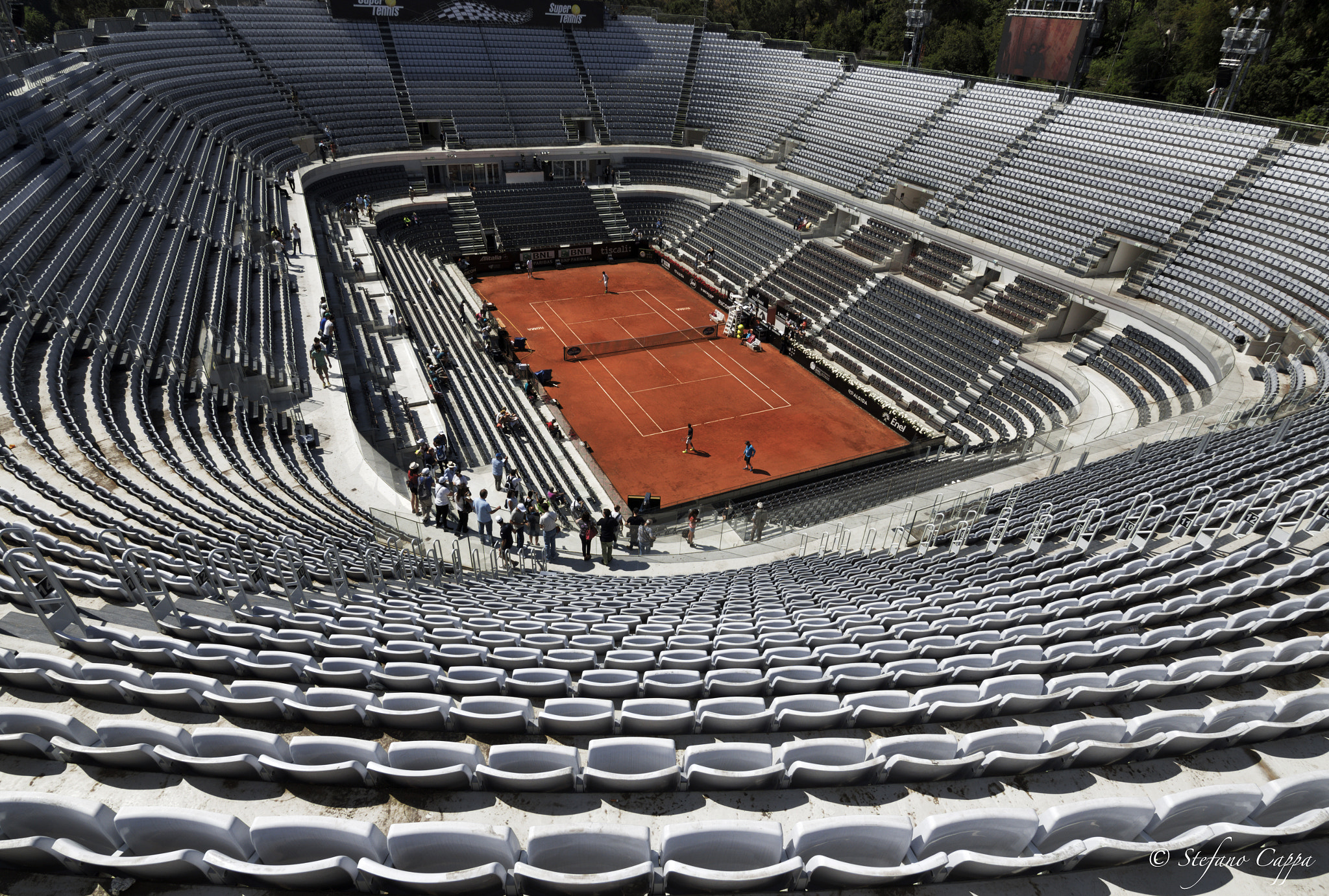
Stadio Centrale, opened in 2010, is the main court of the tournament.

The Italian Open (Italian: Internazionali d'Italia), known as the Internazionali BNL d'Italia for sponsorship reasons, is an annual professional tennis tournament held in Rome, Italy. It is played on clay courts at the Foro Italico, and is held during the second week of May. The tournament is part of the ATP Masters 1000 events on the ATP Tour and part of the WTA 1000 events on the WTA Tour. The two events were combined in 2011.

== History ==
The Italian tennis championship was first held in 1930 in Milan at the Tennis Club and was initiated by Count Alberto Bonacossa. The singles events at the tournament were won by Bill Tilden and Lilí Álvarez. The championships were held in Milan until 1934. The next year, 1935, the event moved to the Foro Italico in Rome. No edition was held between 1936 and 1949. The competition resumed in 1950. In 1961, on the occasion of the 100th Anniversary of the Unification of Italy, the tournament was held in Turin at the Sporting Club. It has had various naming incarnations through the years including: the Italian International Championships, the Rome Masters, and the Internazionali BNL d'Italia for sponsorship reasons.

The Italian Open became "open" to professional players in 1969. Between 1972 and 1989 it was a premier tournament of the Grand Prix Tennis Tour and was part of the Grand Prix Super Series top tier events. In 1990 it became an ATP Championship Series Single Week tournament, which included the nine most prestigious tournaments of the preceding Grand Prix tennis circuit. It has remained part of this category of events until today, that has changed names several times since, to be now known as the ATP 1000 events.

In June 2022, the ATP announced some changes to the ATP calendar for the coming year. The ATP 1000 event in Rome along with those in Shanghai and in Madrid would now be held over two weeks starting in 2023, thus becoming 12 day events just like the ATP 1000 events in Indian Wells and Miami.

In 2025, Italian Tennis and Padel Federation bid $550 million to acquire the Madrid Open, aiming to elevate the Italian Open to Grand Slam status.

In 1979 the women's event was held two weeks before the men's event. The women's event was played in Perugia from 1980 though 1984 and in Taranto in 1985. No women's event was held in 1986 (Note: The Ellesse Grand Prix women's tournament, part of the Virginia Slims World Championships Series, was held in Perugia in July but it was not recognized as the Italian Open.) and it moved back to Rome again in 1987 where it has remained.

The tournament is held at the Foro Italico tennis center, which is an extensive area with a total of 21 clay surface tennis courts, nine of which are used for the Italian Open tournament and the rest for training purposes. There are currently four stadium courts: the main one, Stadio Centrale, was rebuilt for the 2010 tournament and has a capacity of 10,400 spectators. The other grounds are the Stadio Pietrangeli (formerly Pallacorda, 3,500 seats), the Grand Stand Arena and the Supertennis Arena.

== Prize money ==
The ATP 1000 tournament in Rome has a total financial commitment of €8,235,540 for the 2026 edition. This includes prize money of €8,055,385, and other associated fees and costs. The singles champion will earn €1,007,165, and the doubles team that wins will split €409,520. The package is divided as follows:

2026 Event	W	F	SF	QF	Round of 16	Round of 32	Round of 64	Round of 96
Singles	€1,007,165	€535,585	€297,550	€169,375	€92,470	€54,110	€31,585	€21,285
Doubles	€409,520	€216,800	€116,430	€58,220	€31,220	€17,060	—N/a	—N/a

== Past finals ==
=== Men's singles ===
Year	Champions	Runners-up	Score
1930	(United States) Bill Tilden (1/1)	(Italy) Uberto de Morpurgo	6–1, 6–1, 6–2
1931	(United Kingdom) Pat Hughes (1/1)	(France) Henri Cochet	6–4, 6–3, 6–2
1932	(France) André Merlin (1/1)	(United Kingdom) Pat Hughes	6–1, 5–7, 6–0, 8–6
1933	(Italy) Emanuele Sertorio (1/1)	(France) André Martin-Legeay	6–3, 6–1, 6–3
1934	(Italy) Giovanni Palmieri (1/1)	(Italy) Giorgio de Stefani	6–3, 6–0, 7–5
1935	(United States) Wilmer Hines (1/1)	(Italy) Giovanni Palmieri	6–3, 10–8, 9–7
1936– 1949	Not held		
1950	(Egypt) Jaroslav Drobný (1/3)	(United States) Bill Talbert	6–4, 6–3, 7–9, 6–2
1951	(Egypt) Jaroslav Drobný (2/3)	(Italy) Giovanni Cucelli	6–1, 10–8, 6–0
1952	(Australia) Frank Sedgman (1/1)	(Egypt) Jaroslav Drobný	7–5, 6–3, 1–6, 6–4
1953	(Egypt) Jaroslav Drobný (3/3)	(Australia) Lew Hoad	6–2, 6–1, 6–2
1954	(United States) Budge Patty (1/1)	(Argentina) Enrique Morea	11–9, 6–4, 6–4
1955	(Italy) Fausto Gardini (1/1)	(Italy) Giuseppe Merlo	1–6, 6–1, 3–6, 6–6 (ret.)
1956	(Australia) Lew Hoad (1/1)	(Sweden) Sven Davidson	7–5, 6–2, 6–0
1957	(Italy) Nicola Pietrangeli (1/2)	(Italy) Giuseppe Merlo	8–6, 6–2, 6–4
1958	(Australia) Mervyn Rose (1/1)	(Italy) Nicola Pietrangeli	5–7, 8–6, 6–4, 1–6, 6–2
1959	(Chile) Luis Ayala (1/1)	(Australia) Neale Fraser	6–3, 3–6, 6–3, 6–3
1960	(United States) Barry MacKay (1/1)	(Chile) Luis Ayala	7–5, 7–5, 0–6, 0–6, 6–1
1961	(Italy) Nicola Pietrangeli (2/2)	(Australia) Rod Laver	6–8, 6–1, 6–1, 6–2
1962	(Australia) Rod Laver (1/2)	(Australia) Roy Emerson	6–2, 1–6, 3–6, 6–3, 6–1
1963	(Australia) Martin Mulligan (1/3)	(Socialist Federal Republic of Yugoslavia) Boro Jovanović	6–2, 4–6, 6–3, 8–6
1964	(Sweden) Jan-Erik Lundqvist (1/1)	(Australia) Fred Stolle	1–6, 7–5, 6–3, 6–1
1965	(Australia) Martin Mulligan (2/3)	(Spain) Manuel Santana	1–6, 6–4, 6–3, 6–1
1966	(Australia) Tony Roche (1/1)	(Italy) Nicola Pietrangeli	11–9, 6–1, 6–3
1967	(Australia) Martin Mulligan (3/3)	(Australia) Tony Roche	6–3, 0–6, 6–4, 6–1
1968	(Netherlands) Tom Okker (1/1)	(South Africa) Bob Hewitt	10–8, 6–8, 6–1, 1–6, 6–0
↓ Open era ↓
1969	(Australia) John Newcombe (1/1)	(Australia) Tony Roche	6–3, 4–6, 6–2, 5–7, 6–3
1970	(Romania) Ilie Năstase (1/2)	(Czechoslovakia) Jan Kodeš	6–3, 1–6, 6–3, 8–6
↓ WCT circuit ↓
1971	(Australia) Rod Laver (2/2)	(Czechoslovakia) Jan Kodeš	7–5, 6–3, 6–3
↓ Grand Prix circuit ↓
1972	(Spain) Manuel Orantes (1/1)	(Czechoslovakia) Jan Kodeš	4–6, 6–1, 7–5, 6–2
1973	(Romania) Ilie Năstase (2/2)	(Spain) Manuel Orantes	6–1, 6–1, 6–1
1974	(Sweden) Björn Borg (1/2)	(Romania) Ilie Năstase	6–3, 6–4, 6–2
1975	(Mexico) Raúl Ramírez (1/1)	(Spain) Manuel Orantes	7–6^{(7–3)}, 7–5, 7–5
1976	(Italy) Adriano Panatta (1/1)	(Argentina) Guillermo Vilas	2–6, 7–6^{(7–5)}, 6–2, 7–6^{(7–1)}
1977	(United States) Vitas Gerulaitis (1/2)	(Italy) Tonino Zugarelli	6–2, 7–6^{(7–2)}, 3–6, 7–6^{(7–5)}
1978	(Sweden) Björn Borg (2/2)	(Italy) Adriano Panatta	1–6, 6–3, 6–1, 4–6, 6–3
1979	(United States) Vitas Gerulaitis (2/2)	(Argentina) Guillermo Vilas	6–7^{(4–7)}, 7–6^{(7–0)}, 6–7^{(5–7)}, 6–4, 6–2
1980	(Argentina) Guillermo Vilas (1/1)	(France) Yannick Noah	6–0, 6–4, 6–4
1981	(Argentina) José Luis Clerc (1/1)	(Paraguay) Víctor Pecci	6–3, 6–4, 6–0
1982	(Ecuador) Andrés Gómez (1/2)	(United States) Eliot Teltscher	6–2, 6–3, 6–2
1983	(United States) Jimmy Arias (1/1)	(Spain) José Higueras	6–2, 6–7^{(3–7)}, 6–1, 6–4
1984	(Ecuador) Andrés Gómez (2/2)	(United States) Aaron Krickstein	2–6, 6–1, 6–2, 6–2
1985	(France) Yannick Noah (1/1)	(Czechoslovakia) Miloslav Mečíř	6–3, 3–6, 6–2, 7–6^{(7–4)}
1986	(Czechoslovakia) Ivan Lendl (1/2)	(Spain) Emilio Sánchez	7–5, 4–6, 6–1, 6–1
1987	(Sweden) Mats Wilander (1/1)	(Argentina) Martín Jaite	6–3, 6–4, 6–4
1988	(Czechoslovakia) Ivan Lendl (2/2)	(Argentina) Guillermo Pérez Roldán	2–6, 6–4, 6–2, 4–6, 6–4
1989	(Argentina) Alberto Mancini (1/1)	(United States) Andre Agassi	6–3, 4–6, 2–6, 7–6^{(7–2)}, 6–1
↓ ATP Masters 1000 (Note: Known as Championship Series, Single Week from 1990 till 1995, Super 9 from 1996 till 1999 and Masters Series from 2000 till 2008.) ↓
1990	(Austria) Thomas Muster (1/3)	(Soviet Union) Andrei Chesnokov	6–1, 6–3, 6–1
1991	(Spain) Emilio Sánchez (1/1)	(Argentina) Alberto Mancini	6–3, 6–1, 3–0 (ret.)
1992	(United States) Jim Courier (1/2)	(Spain) Carlos Costa	7–6^{(7–3)}, 6–0, 6–4
1993	(United States) Jim Courier (2/2)	(Croatia) Goran Ivanišević	6–1, 6–2, 6–2
1994	(United States) Pete Sampras (1/1)	(Germany) Boris Becker	6–1, 6–2, 6–2
1995	(Austria) Thomas Muster (2/3)	(Spain) Sergi Bruguera	3–6, 7–6^{(7–5)}, 6–2, 6–3
1996	(Austria) Thomas Muster (3/3)	(Netherlands) Richard Krajicek	6–2, 6–4, 3–6, 6–3
1997	(Spain) Àlex Corretja (1/1)	(Chile) Marcelo Ríos	7–5, 7–5, 6–3
1998	(Chile) Marcelo Ríos (1/1)	(Spain) Albert Costa	(walkover)
1999	(Brazil) Gustavo Kuerten (1/1)	(Australia) Patrick Rafter	6–4, 7–5, 7–6^{(8–6)}
2000	(Sweden) Magnus Norman (1/1)	(Brazil) Gustavo Kuerten	6–3, 4–6, 6–4, 6–4
2001	(Spain) Juan Carlos Ferrero (1/1)	(Brazil) Gustavo Kuerten	3–6, 6–1, 2–6, 6–4, 6–2
2002	(United States) Andre Agassi (1/1)	(Germany) Tommy Haas	6–3, 6–3, 6–0
2003	(Spain) Félix Mantilla (1/1)	(Switzerland) Roger Federer	7–5, 6–2, 7–6^{(10–8)}
2004	(Spain) Carlos Moyà (1/1)	(Argentina) David Nalbandian	6–3, 6–3, 6–1
2005	(Spain) Rafael Nadal (1/10)	(Argentina) Guillermo Coria	6–4, 3–6, 6–3, 4–6, 7–6^{(8–6)}
2006	(Spain) Rafael Nadal (2/10)	(Switzerland) Roger Federer	6–7^{(0–7)}, 7–6^{(7–5)}, 6–4, 2–6, 7–6^{(7–5)}
2007	(Spain) Rafael Nadal (3/10)	(Chile) Fernando González	6–2, 6–2
2008	(Serbia) Novak Djokovic (1/6)	(Switzerland) Stan Wawrinka	4–6, 6–3, 6–3
2009	(Spain) Rafael Nadal (4/10)	(Serbia) Novak Djokovic	7–6^{(7–2)}, 6–2
2010	(Spain) Rafael Nadal (5/10)	(Spain) David Ferrer	7–5, 6–2
2011	(Serbia) Novak Djokovic (2/6)	(Spain) Rafael Nadal	6–4, 6–4
2012	(Spain) Rafael Nadal (6/10)	(Serbia) Novak Djokovic	7–5, 6–3
2013	(Spain) Rafael Nadal (7/10)	(Switzerland) Roger Federer	6–1, 6–3
2014	(Serbia) Novak Djokovic (3/6)	(Spain) Rafael Nadal	4–6, 6–3, 6–3
2015	(Serbia) Novak Djokovic (4/6)	(Switzerland) Roger Federer	6–4, 6–3
2016	(United Kingdom) Andy Murray (1/1)	(Serbia) Novak Djokovic	6–3, 6–3
2017	(Germany) Alexander Zverev (1/2)	(Serbia) Novak Djokovic	6–4, 6–3
2018	(Spain) Rafael Nadal (8/10)	(Germany) Alexander Zverev	6–1, 1–6, 6–3
2019	(Spain) Rafael Nadal (9/10)	(Serbia) Novak Djokovic	6–0, 4–6, 6–1
2020	(Serbia) Novak Djokovic (5/6)	(Argentina) Diego Schwartzman	7–5, 6–3
2021	(Spain) Rafael Nadal (10/10)	(Serbia) Novak Djokovic	7–5, 1–6, 6–3
2022	(Serbia) Novak Djokovic (6/6)	(Greece) Stefanos Tsitsipas	6–0, 7–6^{(7–5)}
2023	Daniil Medvedev (1/1)	(Denmark) Holger Rune	7–5, 7–5
2024	(Germany) Alexander Zverev (2/2)	(Chile) Nicolás Jarry	6–4, 7–5
2025	(Spain) Carlos Alcaraz (1/1)	(Italy) Jannik Sinner	7–6^{(7–5)}, 6–1
2026	(Italy) Jannik Sinner (1/1)	(Norway) Casper Ruud	6–4, 6–4

=== Women's singles ===
Year	Champions	Runners-up	Score
1930	(Spain) Lilí Álvarez (1/1)	(Italy) Lucia Valerio	3–6, 8–6, 6–0
1931	(Italy) Lucia Valerio (1/1)	(United States) Dorothy Andrus	2–6, 6–2, 6–2
1932	(France) Ida Adamoff (1/1)	(Italy) Lucia Valerio	6–4, 7–5
1933	(United States) Elizabeth Ryan (1/1)	(France) Ida Adamoff	6–1, 6–1
1934	(United States) Helen Jacobs (1/1)	(Italy) Lucia Valerio	6–3, 6–0
1935	(Denmark) Hilde Krahwinkel Sperling (1/1)	(Italy) Lucia Valerio	6–4, 6–1
1936– 1949	Not held		
1950	(Italy) Annelies Ullstein-Bossi (1/1)	(United Kingdom) Joan Curry	6–4, 6–4
1951	(United States) Doris Hart (1/2)	(United States) Shirley Fry	6–3, 8–6
1952	(United Kingdom) Susan Partridge (1/1)	(United Kingdom) Pat Harrison	6–3, 7–5
1953	(United States) Doris Hart (2/2)	(United States) Maureen Connolly	4–6, 9–7, 6–3
1954	(United States) Maureen Connolly (1/1)	(United Kingdom) Patricia Ward	6–3, 6–0
1955	(United Kingdom) Patricia Ward (1/1)	(West Germany) Erika Vollmer	6–4, 6–3
1956	(United States) Althea Gibson (1/1)	(Hungary) Zsuzsa Körmöczy	6–3, 7–5
1957	(United Kingdom) Shirley Bloomer (1/1)	(United States) Dorothy Head Knode	1–6, 9–7, 6–2
1958	(Brazil) Maria Bueno (1/3)	(Australia) Lorraine Coghlan	3–6, 6–3, 6–3
1959	(United Kingdom) Christine Truman (1/1)	(South Africa) Sandra Reynolds	6–0, 6–1
1960	(Hungary) Zsuzsa Körmöczy (1/1)	(United Kingdom) Ann Haydon	6–4, 4–6, 6–1
1961	(Brazil) Maria Bueno (2/3)	(Australia) Lesley Turner	6–4, 6–4
1962	(Australia) Margaret Smith (1/3)	(Brazil) Maria Bueno	8–6, 5–7, 6–4
1963	(Australia) Margaret Smith (2/3)	(Australia) Lesley Turner	6–3, 6–4
1964	(Australia) Margaret Smith (3/3)	(Australia) Lesley Turner	6–1, 6–1
1965	(Brazil) Maria Bueno (3/3)	(United States) Nancy Richey	6–1, 1–6, 6–3
1966	(United Kingdom) Ann Haydon-Jones (1/1)	(South Africa) Annette Van Zyl	8–6, 6–1
1967	(Australia) Lesley Turner (1/2)	(Brazil) Maria Bueno	6–3, 6–3
1968	(Australia) Lesley Turner Bowrey (2/2)	(Australia) Margaret Smith Court	2–6, 6–2, 6–3
↓ Open era ↓
1969	(United States) Julie Heldman (1/1)	(Australia) Kerry Melville	7–5, 6–3
1970	(United States) Billie Jean King (1/1)	(United States) Julie Heldman	6–1, 6–3
1971	(United Kingdom) Virginia Wade (1/1)	(West Germany) Helga Niessen Masthoff	6–4, 6–4
1972	(United States) Linda Tuero (1/1)	(Soviet Union) Olga Morozova	6–4, 6–3
1973	(Australia) Evonne Goolagong (1/1)	(United States) Chris Evert	7–6^{(8–6)}, 6–0
1974	(United States) Chris Evert (1/5)	(Czechoslovakia) Martina Navratilova	6–3, 6–3
1975	(United States) Chris Evert (2/5)	(Czechoslovakia) Martina Navratilova	6–1, 6–0
1976	(Socialist Federal Republic of Yugoslavia) Mima Jaušovec (1/1)	(Australia) Lesley Hunt	6–1, 6–3
1977	(United States) Janet Newberry (1/1)	(Czechoslovakia) Renáta Tomanová	6–3, 7–6^{(7–5)}
1978	(Czechoslovakia) Regina Maršíková (1/1)	(Romania) Virginia Ruzici	7–5, 7–5
1979	(United States) Tracy Austin (1/1)	(West Germany) Sylvia Hanika	6–4, 1–6, 6–3
1980	(United States) Chris Evert Lloyd (3/5)	(Romania) Virginia Ruzici	5–7, 6–2, 6–2
1981	(United States) Chris Evert Lloyd (4/5)	(Romania) Virginia Ruzici	6–1, 6–2
1982	(United States) Chris Evert Lloyd (5/5)	(Czechoslovakia) Hana Mandlíková	6–0, 6–2
1983	(Hungary) Andrea Temesvári (1/1)	(United States) Bonnie Gadusek	6–1, 6–0
1984	(Bulgaria) Manuela Maleeva (1/1)	(United States) Chris Evert Lloyd	6–3, 6–3
1985	(Italy) Raffaella Reggi (1/1)	(United States) Vicki Nelson-Dunbar	6–4, 6–4
1986	Not held		
1987	(West Germany) Steffi Graf (1/1)	(Argentina) Gabriela Sabatini	7–5, 4–6, 6–0
1988	(Argentina) Gabriela Sabatini (1/4)	(Canada) Helen Kelesi	6–1, 6–7^{(4–7)}, 6–1
1989	(Argentina) Gabriela Sabatini (2/4)	(Spain) Arantxa Sánchez Vicario	6–2, 5–7, 6–4
1990	(Socialist Federal Republic of Yugoslavia) Monica Seles (1/2)	(United States) Martina Navratilova	6–1, 6–1
1991	(Argentina) Gabriela Sabatini (3/4)	(Socialist Federal Republic of Yugoslavia) Monica Seles	6–3, 6–2
1992	(Argentina) Gabriela Sabatini (4/4)	(Federal Republic of Yugoslavia) Monica Seles	7–5, 6–4
1993	(Spain) Conchita Martínez (1/4)	(Argentina) Gabriela Sabatini	7–5, 6–1
1994	(Spain) Conchita Martínez (2/4)	(United States) Martina Navratilova	7–6^{(7–5)}, 6–4
1995	(Spain) Conchita Martínez (3/4)	(Spain) Arantxa Sánchez Vicario	6–3, 6–1
1996	(Spain) Conchita Martínez (4/4)	(Switzerland) Martina Hingis	6–2, 6–3
1997	(France) Mary Pierce (1/1)	(Spain) Conchita Martínez	6–4, 6–0
1998	(Switzerland) Martina Hingis (1/2)	(United States) Venus Williams	6–3, 2–6, 6–3
1999	(United States) Venus Williams (1/1)	(France) Mary Pierce	6–4, 6–2
2000	(United States) Monica Seles (2/2)	(France) Amélie Mauresmo	6–2, 7–6^{(7–4)}
2001	(Federal Republic of Yugoslavia) Jelena Dokić (1/1)	(France) Amélie Mauresmo	7–6^{(7–3)}, 6–1
2002	(United States) Serena Williams (1/4)	(Belgium) Justine Henin	7–6^{(8–6)}, 6–4
2003	(Belgium) Kim Clijsters (1/1)	(France) Amélie Mauresmo	3–6, 7–6^{(7–3)}, 6–0
2004	(France) Amélie Mauresmo (1/2)	(United States) Jennifer Capriati	3–6, 6–3, 7–6^{(8–6)}
2005	(France) Amélie Mauresmo (2/2)	(Switzerland) Patty Schnyder	2–6, 6–3, 6–4
2006	(Switzerland) Martina Hingis (2/2)	(Russia) Dinara Safina	6–2, 7–5
2007	(Serbia) Jelena Janković (1/2)	(Russia) Svetlana Kuznetsova	7–5, 6–1
2008	(Serbia) Jelena Janković (2/2)	(France) Alizé Cornet	6–2, 6–2
2009	(Russia) Dinara Safina (1/1)	(Russia) Svetlana Kuznetsova	6–3, 6–2
2010	(Spain) María José Martínez Sánchez (1/1)	(Serbia) Jelena Janković	7–6^{(7–5)}, 7–5
2011	(Russia) Maria Sharapova (1/3)	(Australia) Samantha Stosur	6–2, 6–4
2012	(Russia) Maria Sharapova (2/3)	(China) Li Na	4–6, 6–4, 7–6^{(7–5)}
2013	(United States) Serena Williams (2/4)	(Belarus) Victoria Azarenka	6–1, 6–3
2014	(United States) Serena Williams (3/4)	(Italy) Sara Errani	6–3, 6–0
2015	(Russia) Maria Sharapova (3/3)	(Spain) Carla Suárez Navarro	4–6, 7–5, 6–1
2016	(United States) Serena Williams (4/4)	(United States) Madison Keys	7–6^{(7–5)}, 6–3
2017	(Ukraine) Elina Svitolina (1/3)	(Romania) Simona Halep	4–6, 7–5, 6–1
2018	(Ukraine) Elina Svitolina (2/3)	(Romania) Simona Halep	6–0, 6–4
2019	(Czech Republic) Karolína Plíšková (1/1)	(United Kingdom) Johanna Konta	6–3, 6–4
2020	(Romania) Simona Halep (1/1)	(Czech Republic) Karolína Plíšková	6–0, 2–1 ret.
2021	(Poland) Iga Świątek (1/3)	(Czech Republic) Karolína Plíšková	6–0, 6–0
2022	(Poland) Iga Świątek (2/3)	(Tunisia) Ons Jabeur	6–2, 6–2
2023	(Kazakhstan) Elena Rybakina (1/1)	(Ukraine) Anhelina Kalinina	6–4, 1–0 ret.
2024	(Poland) Iga Świątek (3/3)	Aryna Sabalenka	6–2, 6–3
2025	(Italy) Jasmine Paolini (1/1)	(United States) Coco Gauff	6–4, 6–2
2026	(Ukraine) Elina Svitolina (3/3)	(United States) Coco Gauff	6–4, 6–7^{(3–7)}, 6–2

=== Men's doubles ===
Year	Champions	Runners-up	Score
1930	(United States) Wilbur Coen (United States) Bill Tilden	(Italy) Umberto de Morpurgo (Italy) Placido Gaslini	6–0, 6–3, 6–3
1931	(Italy) Alberto del Bono (United Kingdom) Pat Hughes	(France) Henri Cochet (France) André Merlin	3–6, 8–6, 4–6, 6–4, 6–3
1932	(Italy) Giorgio de Stefani (United Kingdom) Pat Hughes (2)	(France) J. Bonte (France) André Merlin	6–2, 6–2, 6–4
1933	(France) Jean Lesueur (France) André Martin-Legeay	(Italy) Giovanni Palmieri (Italy) Emanuele Sertorio	6–2, 6–4, 6–2
1934	(Italy) Giovanni Palmieri; George Lyttleton-Rogers	(United Kingdom) Pat Hughes (Italy) Giorgio de Stefani	3–6, 6–4, 9–7, 0–6, 6–2
1935	(Australia) Jack Crawford (Australia) Vivian McGrath	(France) Jean Borotra (France) Jacques Brugnon	4–6, 4–6, 6–4, 6–2, 6–2
1936–1949	Not held		
1950	(United States) Bill Talbert (United States) Tony Trabert	(United States) Budge Patty (Australia) Bill Sidwell	6–3, 6–1, 4–6 (ret.)
1951	(Egypt) Jaroslav Drobný (Australia) Frank Sedgman	(Italy) Giovanni Cucelli (Italy) Marcello Del Bello	6–2, 7–9, 6–1, 6–3
1952	(Egypt) Jaroslav Drobný (2) (Australia) Frank Sedgman (2)	(Italy) Giovanni Cucelli (Italy) Marcello Del Bello	3–6, 7–5, 3–6, 6–3, 6–2
1953	(Australia) Lew Hoad (Australia) Ken Rosewall	(Egypt) Jaroslav Drobný (United States) Budge Patty	6–2, 6–4, 6–2
1954	(Egypt) Jaroslav Drobný (3) (Argentina) Enrique Morea	(United States) Tony Trabert (United States) Vic Seixas	6–4, 0–6, 3–6, 6–3, 6–4
1955	(United States) Art Larsen (Argentina) Enrique Morea (2)	(Italy) Nicola Pietrangeli (Italy) Orlando Sirola	6–1, 6–4, 4–6, 7–5
1956	(Egypt) Jaroslav Drobný (4) (Australia) Lew Hoad (2)	(Italy) Nicola Pietrangeli (Italy) Orlando Sirola	11–9, 6–2, 6–3
1957	(Australia) Neale Fraser (Australia) Lew Hoad (3)	(Italy) Nicola Pietrangeli (Italy) Orlando Sirola	6–1, 6–8, 6–0, 6–2
1958	(Hungary) Antal Jancsó (Denmark) Kurt Nielsen	(Chile) Luis Ayala (Australia) Don Candy	8–10, 6–3, 6–2, 1–6, 9–7
1959	(Australia) Roy Emerson (Australia) Neale Fraser (2)	(Italy) Nicola Pietrangeli (Italy) Orlando Sirola	8–6, 6–4, 6–4
1960	Title shared: (Italy) Nicola Pietrangeli (Italy) Orlando Sirola vs. (Australia) Roy Emerson (2) (Australia) Neale Fraser (3)		3–6, 7–5, 2–6, 11–11 (suspended)
1961	(Australia) Roy Emerson (3) (Australia) Neale Fraser (4)	(Italy) Nicola Pietrangeli (Italy) Orlando Sirola	6–2, 6–4, 11–9
1962	(Australia) Roy Emerson (4) (Australia) Neale Fraser (5)	(Australia) Ken Fletcher (Australia) John Newcombe	6–2, 6–4, 11–9
1963	(Australia) Bob Hewitt (Australia) Neale Fraser (6)	(Italy) Nicola Pietrangeli (Italy) Orlando Sirola	6–3, 6–3, 6–1
1964	(Australia) Bob Hewitt (2) (Australia) Neale Fraser (7)	(Australia) Tony Roche (Australia) John Newcombe	7–5, 6–3, 3–6, 7–5
1965	Title shared: (Australia) Tony Roche (Australia) John Newcombe vs. (Brazil) Ronald Barnes (Brazil) Thomaz Koch		1–6, 6–4, 2–6, 12–10 (abandoned)
1966	(Australia) Roy Emerson (5) (Australia) Fred Stolle	(Italy) Nicola Pietrangeli (Australia) Cliff Drysdale	6–4, 12–10, 6–3
1967	(South Africa) Bob Hewitt (3) (South Africa) Frew McMillan	(United States) Bill Bowrey (Australia) Owen Davidson	6–3, 2–6, 6–3, 9–7
1968	(Netherlands) Tom Okker (United States) Marty Riessen	(Greece) Nicholas Kalogeropoulos (Australia) Allan Stone	6–3, 6–4, 6–2
↓ Open era ↓
1969	Title shared: (Netherlands) Tom Okker (2) (United States) Marty Riessen (2) vs. (Australia) John Newcombe (2) (Australia) Tony Roche (2)		4–6, 6–1 (abandoned)
1970	(Romania) Ilie Năstase (Romania) Ion Țiriac	(Australia) William Bowrey (Australia) Owen Davidson	0–6, 10–8, 6–3, 6–8, 6–1
↓ WCT circuit ↓
1971	(Australia) John Newcombe (3) (Australia) Tony Roche (3)	(Spain) Andrés Gimeno (United Kingdom) Roger Taylor	6–4, 6–4
↓ Grand Prix circuit ↓
1972	(Romania) Ilie Năstase (2) (Romania) Ion Țiriac (2)	(Australia) Lew Hoad (South Africa) Frew McMillan	3–6, 3–6, 6–4, 6–3, 5–3 (ret.)
1973	(Australia) John Newcombe (4) (Netherlands) Tom Okker (3)	(Australia) Ross Case (Australia) Geoff Masters	6–2, 6–3, 6–4
1974	(United States) Brian Gottfried (Mexico) Raúl Ramírez	(Spain) Juan Gisbert (Romania) Ilie Năstase	6–3, 6–2, 6–3
1975	(United States) Brian Gottfried (2) (Mexico) Raúl Ramírez (2)	(United States) Jimmy Connors (Romania) Ilie Năstase	6–4, 7–6, 2–6, 6–1
1976	(United States) Brian Gottfried (3) (Mexico) Raúl Ramírez (3)	(Australia) Geoff Masters (Australia) John Newcombe	7–6, 5–7, 6–3, 3–6, 6–3 (Note: The final was stopped at two sets all due to bad light and the final set was played on 15 September in Houston, TX, USA.)
1977	(United States) Brian Gottfried (4) (Mexico) Raúl Ramírez (4)	(United States) Fred McNair (United States) Sherwood Stewart	6–7, 7–6, 7–5
1978	(Paraguay) Víctor Pecci (Chile) Belus Prajoux	(Czechoslovakia) Jan Kodeš (Czechoslovakia) Tomáš Šmíd	6–7, 7–6, 6–1
1979	(United States) Peter Fleming (Czechoslovakia) Tomáš Šmíd	(Argentina) José Luis Clerc (Romania) Ilie Năstase	4–6, 6–1, 7–5
1980	(Australia) Mark Edmondson (Australia) Kim Warwick	(Hungary) Balázs Taróczy (United States) Eliot Teltscher	7–6, 7–6
1981	(Chile) Hans Gildemeister (Ecuador) Andrés Gómez	(United States) Bruce Manson (Czechoslovakia) Tomáš Šmíd	7–5, 6–2
1982	(Switzerland) Heinz Günthardt (Hungary) Balázs Taróczy	(Poland) Wojtek Fibak (Australia) John Fitzgerald	6–4, 4–6, 6–3
1983	(Paraguay) Francisco González (Paraguay) Víctor Pecci (2)	(Sweden) Jan Gunnarsson (United States) Mike Leach	6–4, 6–2
1984	(United States) Ken Flach (United States) Robert Seguso	(Australia) John Alexander (United States) Mike Leach	3–6, 6–3, 6–4
1985	(Sweden) Anders Järryd (Sweden) Mats Wilander	(United States) Ken Flach (United States) Robert Seguso	4–6, 6–3, 6–2
1986	(France) Guy Forget (France) Yannick Noah	(Australia) Mark Edmondson (United States) Sherwood Stewart	7–6, 6–2
1987	(France) Guy Forget (2) (France) Yannick Noah (2)	(Czechoslovakia) Miloslav Mečíř (Czechoslovakia) Tomáš Šmíd	6–2, 6–7, 6–3
1988	(Mexico) Jorge Lozano (United States) Todd Witsken	(Sweden) Anders Järryd (Czechoslovakia) Tomáš Šmíd	6–3, 6–3
1989	(United States) Jim Courier (United States) Pete Sampras	(Brazil) Danilo Marcelino (Brazil) Mauro Menezes	6–4, 6–3
↓ ATP Masters 1000 ↓
1990	(Spain) Sergio Casal (Spain) Emilio Sánchez	(United States) Jim Courier (United States) Martin Davis	7–6, 7–5
1991	(Italy) Omar Camporese (Socialist Federal Republic of Yugoslavia) Goran Ivanišević	(United States) Luke Jensen (Australia) Laurie Warder	6–2, 6–3
1992	(Switzerland) Jakob Hlasek (Switzerland) Marc Rosset	(South Africa) Wayne Ferreira (Australia) Mark Kratzmann	6–4, 3–6, 6–1
1993	(Netherlands) Jacco Eltingh (Netherlands) Paul Haarhuis	(South Africa) Wayne Ferreira (Australia) Mark Kratzmann	6–4, 7–6
1994	(Russia) Yevgeny Kafelnikov (Czech Republic) David Rikl	(South Africa) Wayne Ferreira (Spain) Javier Sánchez	6–1, 7–5
1995	(Czech Republic) Cyril Suk (Czech Republic) Daniel Vacek	(Sweden) Jan Apell (Sweden) Jonas Björkman	6–3, 6–4
1996	(Zimbabwe) Byron Black (Canada) Grant Connell	(Belgium) Libor Pimek (South Africa) Byron Talbot	6–2, 6–3
1997	(The Bahamas) Mark Knowles (Canada) Daniel Nestor	(Zimbabwe) Byron Black (United States) Alex O'Brien	6–3, 4–6, 7–5
1998	(India) Mahesh Bhupathi (India) Leander Paes	(South Africa) Ellis Ferreira (United States) Rick Leach	6–4, 4–6, 7–6
1999	(South Africa) Ellis Ferreira (United States) Rick Leach	(South Africa) David Adams (South Africa) John-Laffnie de Jager	6–7, 6–1, 6–2
2000	(Czech Republic) Martin Damm (Slovakia) Dominik Hrbatý	(South Africa) Wayne Ferreira (Russia) Yevgeny Kafelnikov	6–4, 4–6, 6–3
2001	(South Africa) Wayne Ferreira (Russia) Yevgeny Kafelnikov (2)	(Canada) Daniel Nestor (Australia) Sandon Stolle	6–4, 7–6^{(7–6)}
2002	(Czech Republic) Martin Damm (2) (Czech Republic) Cyril Suk (2)	(Zimbabwe) Wayne Black (Zimbabwe) Kevin Ullyett	7–5, 7–5
2003	(Australia) Wayne Arthurs (Australia) Paul Hanley	(France) Michaël Llodra (France) Fabrice Santoro	7–5, 7–6^{(7–5)}
2004	(India) Mahesh Bhupathi (2) (Belarus) Max Mirnyi	(Australia) Wayne Arthurs (Australia) Paul Hanley	1–6, 6–4, 7–6^{(7–1)}
2005	(France) Michaël Llodra (France) Fabrice Santoro	(United States) Bob Bryan (United States) Mike Bryan	7–5, 6–4
2006	(The Bahamas) Mark Knowles (2) (Canada) Daniel Nestor (2)	(Israel) Jonathan Erlich (Israel) Andy Ram	4–6, 6–4, [10–6]
2007	(France) Fabrice Santoro (2) (Serbia) Nenad Zimonjić	(United States) Bob Bryan (United States) Mike Bryan	6–4, 6–7^{(4–7)}, [10–7]
2008	(United States) Bob Bryan (United States) Mike Bryan	(Canada) Daniel Nestor (Serbia) Nenad Zimonjić	3–6, 6–4, [10–8]
2009	(Canada) Daniel Nestor (3) (Serbia) Nenad Zimonjić (2)	(United States) Bob Bryan (United States) Mike Bryan	7–6^{(7–5)}, 6–3
2010	(United States) Bob Bryan (2) (United States) Mike Bryan (2)	(United States) John Isner (United States) Sam Querrey	6–2, 6–3
2011	(United States) John Isner (United States) Sam Querrey	(United States) Mardy Fish (United States) Andy Roddick	(walkover)
2012	(Spain) Marcel Granollers (Spain) Marc López	(Poland) Łukasz Kubot (Serbia) Janko Tipsarević	6–3, 6–2
2013	(United States) Bob Bryan (3) (United States) Mike Bryan (3)	(India) Mahesh Bhupathi (India) Rohan Bopanna	6–2, 6–3
2014	(Canada) Daniel Nestor (4) (Serbia) Nenad Zimonjić (3)	(Netherlands) Robin Haase (Spain) Feliciano López	6–4, 7–6^{(7–2)}
2015	(Uruguay) Pablo Cuevas (Spain) David Marrero	(Spain) Marcel Granollers (Spain) Marc López	6–4, 7–5
2016	(United States) Bob Bryan (4) (United States) Mike Bryan (4)	(Canada) Vasek Pospisil (United States) Jack Sock	2–6, 6–3, [10–7]
2017	(France) Pierre-Hugues Herbert (France) Nicolas Mahut	(Croatia) Ivan Dodig (Spain) Marcel Granollers	4–6, 6–4, [10–3]
2018	(Colombia) Juan Sebastián Cabal (Colombia) Robert Farah	(Spain) Pablo Carreño Busta (Portugal) João Sousa	3–6, 6–4, [10–4]
2019	(Colombia) Juan Sebastián Cabal (2) (Colombia) Robert Farah (2)	(South Africa) Raven Klaasen (New Zealand) Michael Venus	6–1, 6–3
2020	(Spain) Marcel Granollers (2) (Argentina) Horacio Zeballos	(France) Jérémy Chardy (France) Fabrice Martin	6–4, 5–7, [10–8]
2021	(Croatia) Nikola Mektić (Croatia) Mate Pavić	(United States) Rajeev Ram (United Kingdom) Joe Salisbury	6–4, 7–6^{(7–4)}
2022	(Croatia) Nikola Mektić (2) (Croatia) Mate Pavić (2)	(United States) John Isner (Argentina) Diego Schwartzman	6–2, 6–7^{(6–8)}, [12–10]
2023	(Monaco) Hugo Nys (Poland) Jan Zieliński	(Netherlands) Robin Haase (Netherlands) Botic van de Zandschulp	7–5, 6–1
2024	(Spain) Marcel Granollers (3) (Argentina) Horacio Zeballos (2)	(El Salvador) Marcelo Arévalo (Croatia) Mate Pavić	6–2, 6–2
2025	(El Salvador) Marcelo Arévalo (Croatia) Mate Pavić (3)	(France) Sadio Doumbia (France) Fabien Reboul	6–4, 6–7^{(6–8)}, [13–11]
2026	(Italy) Simone Bolelli (Italy) Andrea Vavassori	(Spain) Marcel Granollers (Argentina) Horacio Zeballos	7–6^{(10–8)}, 6–7^{(3–7)}, [10–3]

=== Women's doubles ===
Year	Champions	Runners-up	Score
1930	(Spain) Lilí Álvarez (Italy) Lucia Valerio	(France) Leila-Claude Anet (France) Arlette Neufeld	7–5, 7–5
1931	(Italy) Anna Luzzatti (Italy) Rosetta Gagliardi Prouse	(Italy) Lucia Valerio (United States) Dorothy Andrus	6–3, 1–6, 6–3
1932	(France) Colette Rosambert (Switzerland) Lolette Payot	(Italy) Lucia Valerio (United States) Dorothy Andrus Burke	7–5, 6–3
1933	(France) Ida Adamoff (United States) Dorothy Andrus Burke	(United States) Elizabeth Ryan (Italy) Lucia Valerio	6–3, 1–6, 6–4
1934	(United States) Helen Jacobs (United States) Elizabeth Ryan	(France) Ida Adamoff (United States) Dorothy Andrus	7–5, 9–7
1935	(United Kingdom) Evelyn Dearman (United Kingdom) Nancy Lyle	(Germany) Cilly Aussem (United States) Elizabeth Ryan	6–2, 6–4
1936–1949	Not held		
1950	(United Kingdom) Jean Quertier (United Kingdom) Jean Bridger Walker-Smith	(United Kingdom) Elizabeth Clements Hilton (United Kingdom) Katherine Tuckey	1–6, 6–3, 6–2
1951	(United States) Shirley Fry (United States) Doris Hart	(United States) Louise Brough (Australia) Thelma Coyne Long	6–1, 7–5
1952	(Australia) Nell Hall Hopman (Australia) Thelma Coyne Long	(Italy) Nicla Migliori (Italy) Vittoria Tonolli	6–2, 6–8, 6–3
1953	(United States) Maureen Connolly (United States) Julia Sampson	(United States) Shirley Fry (United States) Doris Hart	6–8, 6–4, 6–4
1954	(United Kingdom) Elaine Watson (United Kingdom) Patricia Ward	(France) Nelly Adamson Landry (France) Ginette Jucker Bucaille	3–6, 6–3, 6–4
1955	(Belgium) Christiane Mercelis (United Kingdom) Patricia Ward (2)	(Australia) Fay Muller (Australia) Beryl Penrose	6–4, 10–8
1956	(Australia) Thelma Coyne Long (2) (Australia) Mary Bevis Hawton	(United States) Darlene Hard (United Kingdom) Angela Buxton	6–4, 6–8, 9–7
1957	(Australia) Thelma Coyne Long (3) (Australia) Mary Bevis Hawton (2)	(Mexico) Rosa Reyes (Mexico) Yola Ramírez	6–1, 6–1
1958	(United Kingdom) Shirley Bloomer (United Kingdom) Christine Truman	(Australia) Thelma Coyne Long (Australia) Mary Bevis Hawton	6–3, 6–2
1959	(Mexico) Rosa Reyes (Mexico) Yola Ramírez	(Brazil) Maria Bueno (United States) Janet Hopps	4–6, 6–4, 6–4
1960	(Australia) Margaret Hellyer (Mexico) Yola Ramírez (2)	(United Kingdom) Shirley Bloomer Brasher (United Kingdom) Ann Haydon	6–4, 6–4
1961	(Australia) Jan Lehane (Australia) Lesley Turner	(Australia) Margaret Smith (Australia) Mary Carter Reitano	2–6, 6–1, 6–1
1962	(Brazil) Maria Bueno (United States) Darlene Hard	(Italy) Silvana Lazzarino (Italy) Lea Pericoli	6–4, 6–4
1963	(Australia) Margaret Smith (Australia) Robyn Ebbern	(Italy) Silvana Lazzarino (Italy) Lea Pericoli	6–2, 6–3
1964	(Australia) Margaret Smith (2) (Australia) Lesley Turner (2)	(Italy) Silvana Lazzarino (Italy) Lea Pericoli	6–1, 6–2
1965	(Australia) Madonna Schacht (South Africa) Annette Van Zyl	(Italy) Silvana Lazzarino (Italy) Lea Pericoli	2–6, 6–2, 12–10
1966	(Argentina) Norma Baylon (South Africa) Annette Van Zyl (2)	(United Kingdom) Ann Haydon-Jones (United Kingdom) Elizabeth Starkie	6–3, 1–6, 6–2
1967	(United States) Rosemary Casals (Australia) Lesley Turner (3)	(Italy) Silvana Lazzarino (Italy) Lea Pericoli	7–5, 7–5
1968	(Australia) Margaret Smith Court (3) (United Kingdom) Virginia Wade	(South Africa) Annette Van Zyl du Plooy (South Africa) Patricia Walkden	6–2, 7–5
↓ Open era ↓
1969	(France) Françoise Dürr (United Kingdom) Ann Haydon-Jones	(United States) Rosemary Casals (United States) Billie Jean King	6–3, 3–6, 6–3
1970	(United States) Rosemary Casals (2) (United States) Billie Jean King	(France) Françoise Dürr (United Kingdom) Virginia Wade	6–2, 3–6, 9–7
1971	(West Germany) Helga Niessen Masthoff (United Kingdom) Virginia Wade (2)	(Australia) Lesley Turner Bowrey (Australia) Helen Gourlay	5–7, 6–2, 6–2
1972	(Australia) Lesley Hunt (Soviet Union) Olga Morozova	(France) Gail Sherriff Chanfreau (Italy) Rosalba Vido	6–3, 6–4
1973	(Soviet Union) Olga Morozova (2) (United Kingdom) Virginia Wade (3)	(Czechoslovakia) Martina Navratilova (Czechoslovakia) Renáta Tomanová	3–6, 6–2, 7–5
1974	(United States) Chris Evert (Soviet Union) Olga Morozova (3)	(West Germany) Helga Niessen Masthoff (West Germany) Heide Orth	(walkover)
1975	(United States) Chris Evert (2) (Czechoslovakia) Martina Navratilova	(United Kingdom) Sue Barker (United Kingdom) Glynis Coles	6–1, 6–2
1976	(South Africa) Linky Boshoff (South Africa) Ilana Kloss	(Romania) Virginia Ruzici (Romania) Mariana Simionescu	6–1, 6–2
1977	(South Africa) Brigitte Cuypers (South Africa) Marise Kruger	(United States) Bunny Bruning (United States) Sharon Walsh	3–6, 7–5, 6–2
1978	(Socialist Federal Republic of Yugoslavia) Mima Jaušovec (Romania) Virginia Ruzici	(Romania) Florența Mihai (United States) Betsy Nagelsen	6–2, 2–6, 7–6
1979	(Netherlands) Betty Stöve (Czechoslovakia) Renáta Tomanová	(Australia) Evonne Goolagong Cawley (Australia) Kerry Melville Reid	6–3, 6–4
1980	(Czechoslovakia) Hana Mandlíková (Czechoslovakia) Renáta Tomanová (2)	(Argentina) Ivanna Madruga (Argentina) Adriana Villagrán	6–4, 6–4
1981	(United States) Candy Reynolds (United States) Paula Smith	(United States) Chris Evert Lloyd (Romania) Virginia Ruzici	7–5, 6–1
1982	(United States) Kathleen Horvath (South Africa) Yvonne Vermaak	(United States) Billie Jean King (South Africa) Ilana Kloss	2–6, 6–4, 7–6
1983	(Romania) Virginia Ruzici (2) (United Kingdom) Virginia Wade (4)	(Argentina) Ivanna Madruga (France) Catherine Tanvier	6–3, 2–6, 6–1
1984	(Czechoslovakia) Iva Budařová (Czechoslovakia) Helena Suková	(United States) Kathleen Horvath (Romania) Virginia Ruzici	7–6^{(7–5)}, 1–6, 6–4
1985	(Italy) Sandra Cecchini (Italy) Raffaella Reggi	(Italy) Patrizia Murgo (Italy) Barbara Romanò	1–6, 6–4, 6–3
1986	Not held		
1987	(United States) Martina Navratilova (2) (Argentina) Gabriela Sabatini	(West Germany) Claudia Kohde-Kilsch (Czechoslovakia) Helena Suková	6–4, 6–1
1988	(Czechoslovakia) Jana Novotná (France) Catherine Suire	(Australia) Jenny Byrne (Australia) Janine Thompson	6–3, 4–6, 7–5
1989	(Australia) Elizabeth Smylie (Australia) Janine Thompson	(Netherlands) Manon Bollegraf (Argentina) Mercedes Paz	6–4, 6–3
1990	(Canada) Helen Kelesi (Socialist Federal Republic of Yugoslavia) Monica Seles	(Italy) Laura Garrone (Italy) Laura Golarsa	6–3, 6–4
1991	(United States) Jennifer Capriati (Socialist Federal Republic of Yugoslavia) Monica Seles (2)	(Australia) Nicole Bradtke (South Africa) Elna Reinach	7–5, 6–2
1992	(Federal Republic of Yugoslavia) Monica Seles (3) (Czechoslovakia) Helena Suková (2)	(Bulgaria) Katerina Maleeva (Germany) Barbara Rittner	6–1, 6–2
1993	(Czech Republic) Jana Novotná (2) (Spain) Arantxa Sánchez Vicario	(United States) Mary Joe Fernández (United States) Zina Garrison-Jackson	6–4, 6–2
1994	(United States) Gigi Fernández (Belarus) Natasha Zvereva	(Argentina) Gabriela Sabatini (Netherlands) Brenda Schultz-McCarthy	6–1, 6–3
1995	(United States) Gigi Fernández (2) (Belarus) Natasha Zvereva (2)	(Spain) Conchita Martínez (Argentina) Patricia Tarabini	4–6, 7–6^{(7–3)}, 6–4
1996	(Spain) Arantxa Sánchez Vicario (2) (Romania) Irina Spîrlea	(United States) Gigi Fernández (Switzerland) Martina Hingis	6–4, 3–6, 6–3
1997	(United States) Nicole Arendt (Netherlands) Manon Bollegraf	(Spain) Conchita Martínez (Argentina) Patricia Tarabini	6–2, 6–4
1998	(Spain) Virginia Ruano Pascual (Argentina) Paola Suárez	(South Africa) Amanda Coetzer (Spain) Arantxa Sánchez Vicario	7–6^{(7–1)}, 6–4
1999	(Switzerland) Martina Hingis (Russia) Anna Kournikova	(France) Alexandra Fusai (France) Nathalie Tauziat	6–2, 6–2
2000	(United States) Lisa Raymond (Australia) Rennae Stubbs	(Spain) Arantxa Sánchez Vicario (Spain) Magüi Serna	6–3, 4–6, 6–2
2001	(Zimbabwe) Cara Black (Russia) Elena Likhovtseva	(Argentina) Paola Suárez (Argentina) Patricia Tarabini	6–1, 6–1
2002	(Spain) Virginia Ruano Pascual (2) (Argentina) Paola Suárez (2)	(Spain) Conchita Martínez (Argentina) Patricia Tarabini	6–3, 6–4
2003	(Russia) Svetlana Kuznetsova (United States) Martina Navratilova (3)	(Federal Republic of Yugoslavia) Jelena Dokić (Russia) Nadia Petrova	6–4, 5–7, 6–2
2004	(Russia) Nadia Petrova (United States) Meghann Shaughnessy	(Spain) Virginia Ruano Pascual (Argentina) Paola Suárez	2–6, 6–3, 6–3
2005	(Zimbabwe) Cara Black (2) (South Africa) Liezel Huber	(Russia) Maria Kirilenko (Spain) Anabel Medina Garrigues	6–0, 4–6, 6–1
2006	(Slovakia) Daniela Hantuchová (Japan) Ai Sugiyama	(Czech Republic) Květa Peschke (Italy) Francesca Schiavone	3–6, 6–3, 6–1
2007	(France) Nathalie Dechy (Italy) Mara Santangelo	(Italy) Tathiana Garbin (Italy) Roberta Vinci	6–4, 6–1
2008	(Chinese Taipei) Chan Yung-jan (Chinese Taipei) Chuang Chia-jung	(Czech Republic) Iveta Benešová (Slovakia) Janette Husárová	7–6^{(7–5)}, 6–3
2009	(Chinese Taipei) Hsieh Su-wei (China) Peng Shuai	(Slovakia) Daniela Hantuchová (Japan) Ai Sugiyama	7–5, 7–6^{(7–5)}
2010	(Argentina) Gisela Dulko (Italy) Flavia Pennetta	(Spain) Nuria Llagostera Vives (Spain) María José Martínez Sánchez	6–4, 6–2
2011	(China) Peng Shuai (2) (China) Zheng Jie	(United States) Vania King (Kazakhstan) Yaroslava Shvedova	6–2, 6–3
2012	(Italy) Sara Errani (Italy) Roberta Vinci	(Russia) Ekaterina Makarova (Russia) Elena Vesnina	6–2, 7–5
2013	(Chinese Taipei) Hsieh Su-wei (2) (China) Peng Shuai (3)	(Italy) Sara Errani (Italy) Roberta Vinci	4–6, 6–3, [10–8]
2014	(Czech Republic) Květa Peschke (Slovenia) Katarina Srebotnik	(Italy) Sara Errani (Italy) Roberta Vinci	4–0, ret.
2015	(Hungary) Tímea Babos (France) Kristina Mladenovic	(Switzerland) Martina Hingis (India) Sania Mirza	6–4, 6–3
2016	(Switzerland) Martina Hingis (2) (India) Sania Mirza	(Russia) Ekaterina Makarova (Russia) Elena Vesnina	6–1, 6–7^{(5–7)}, [10–3]
2017	(Switzerland) Martina Hingis (3) (Chinese Taipei) Chan Yung-jan (2)	(Russia) Ekaterina Makarova (Russia) Elena Vesnina	7–5, 7–6^{(7–4)}
2018	(Australia) Ashleigh Barty (Netherlands) Demi Schuurs	(Czech Republic) Andrea Sestini Hlaváčková (Czech Republic) Barbora Strýcová	6–3, 6–4
2019	(Belarus) Victoria Azarenka (Australia) Ashleigh Barty (2)	(Germany) Anna-Lena Grönefeld (Netherlands) Demi Schuurs	4–6, 6–0, [10–3]
2020	(Chinese Taipei) Hsieh Su-wei (3) (Czech Republic) Barbora Strýcová	(Germany) Anna-Lena Friedsam (Romania) Raluca Olaru	6–2, 6–2
2021	(Canada) Sharon Fichman (Mexico) Giuliana Olmos	(France) Kristina Mladenovic (Czech Republic) Markéta Vondroušová	4–6, 7–5, [10–5]
2022	(Russia) Veronika Kudermetova (Russia) Anastasia Pavlyuchenkova	(Canada) Gabriela Dabrowski (Mexico) Giuliana Olmos	1–6, 6–4, [10–7]
2023	(Australia) Storm Hunter (Belgium) Elise Mertens	(United States) Coco Gauff (United States) Jessica Pegula	6–4, 6–4
2024	(Italy) Sara Errani (2) (Italy) Jasmine Paolini	(United States) Coco Gauff (New Zealand) Erin Routliffe	6–3, 4–6, [10–8]
2025	(Italy) Sara Errani (3) (Italy) Jasmine Paolini (2)	Veronika Kudermetova (Belgium) Elise Mertens	6–4, 7–5
2026	Mirra Andreeva; Diana Shnaider	(Spain) Cristina Bucșa (United States) Nicole Melichar-Martinez	6–3, 6–3

== Records ==
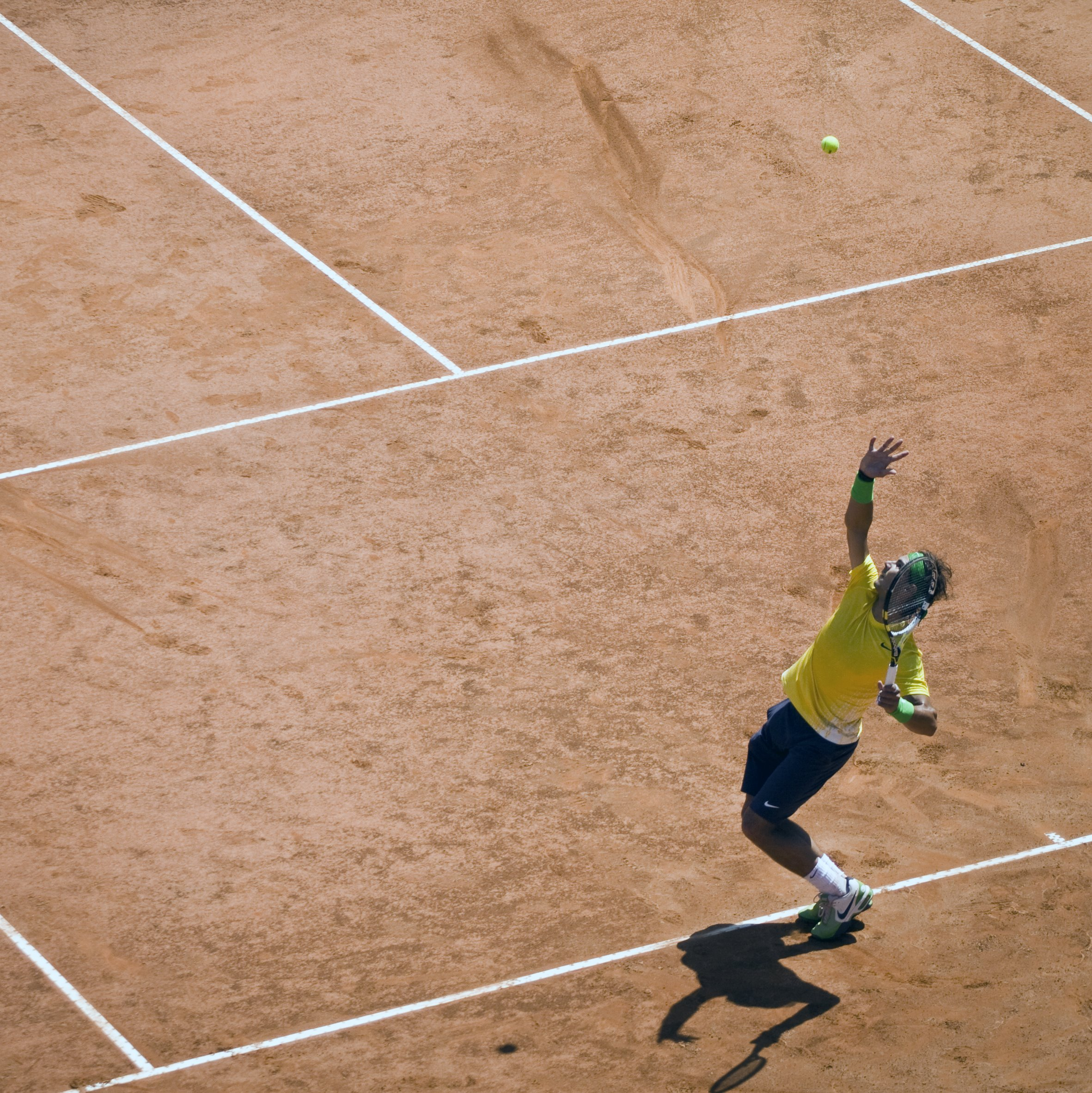
Rafael Nadal at the 2011 Italian Open. Nadal has won a record ten Italian Open singles titles.

Source: The Tennis Base

=== Men's singles ===
Most titles	(Spain) Rafael Nadal	10
Most finals	(Spain) Rafael Nadal	12
Most finals	(Serbia) Novak Djokovic	12
Most runner-ups	(Serbia) Novak Djokovic	6
Most consecutive titles	(Spain) Rafael Nadal (2005–2007)	3
Most consecutive finals	(Spain) Rafael Nadal (2009–2014)	6
Most matches played	(Serbia) Novak Djokovic	81
Most matches won	(Spain) Rafael Nadal	70
Most consecutive matches won	(Spain) Rafael Nadal	17
Most editions played	(Italy) Nicola Pietrangeli	22
Best winning %	(Australia) Rod Laver	93.75%
Best winning %	(Sweden) Björn Borg	93.75%
Youngest champion	(Sweden) Björn Borg	17y, 11m, 2d (1974)
Oldest champion	(United States) Bill Tilden	38y, 2m, 18d (1930)

Longest final
1979 (57 games)
(United States) Vitas Gerulaitis	6^{4}	7^{7}	6^{5}	6	6
(Argentina) Guillermo Vilas	7^{7}	6^{0}	7^{7}	4	2

Longest final
2006 (57 games)
(Spain) Rafael Nadal	6^{0}	7^{7}	6	2	7^{7}
(Switzerland) Roger Federer	7^{7}	6^{5}	4	6	6^{5}

Shortest final
2007 (16 games)
(Spain) Rafael Nadal	6	6
(Chile) Fernando González	2	2

Shortest final
2013 (16 games)
(Spain) Rafael Nadal	6	6
(Switzerland) Roger Federer	1	3

=== Women's singles ===
Most titles	(United States) Chris Evert	5
Most finals	(United States) Chris Evert	7
Most runner-ups	(Italy) Lucia Valerio	4
Most runner-ups	(Czechoslovakia) / (United States) Martina Navratilova	4
Most consecutive titles	(Spain) Conchita Martínez (1993–1996)	4
Most consecutive finals	(Spain) Conchita Martínez (1993–1997)	5
Most consecutive runner-ups	(Italy) Lucia Valerio (1934, 1935)	2
Most consecutive runner-ups	(Australia) Lesley Turner (1963, 1964)	2
Most consecutive runner-ups	(Czechoslovakia) Martina Navratilova (1974, 1975)	2
Most consecutive runner-ups	(Romania) Virginia Ruzici (1980, 1981)	2
Most consecutive runner-ups	(Federal Republic of Yugoslavia) Monica Seles (1991, 1992)	2
Most consecutive runner-ups	(France) Amélie Mauresmo (2000, 2001)	2
Most consecutive runner-ups	(Romania) Simona Halep (2017, 2018)	2
Most consecutive runner-ups	(Czech Republic) Karolína Plíšková (2020, 2021)	2
Most matches played	(Spain) Conchita Martínez	53
Most matches played	(United States) Serena Williams	53
Most matches won	(United States) Serena Williams	44
Most consecutive matches won (not skipped events)	(Spain) Conchita Martínez	24
Most editions played	(Italy) Lea Pericoli	20
Best winning % (minimum of 20 matches played)	(United States) Chris Evert (36–3)	92.31%
Best winning % (minimum of 20 matches played)	(Australia) Margaret Court (24–2)	92.31%
Undefeated at this tournament (minimum of 1 title)	(United States) Doris Hart	(7–0) (1951, 1953)
Undefeated at this tournament (minimum of 1 title)	(United States) Althea Gibson	(5–0) (1956)
Undefeated at this tournament (minimum of 1 title)	(United States) Tracy Austin	(5–0) (1979)
Undefeated at this tournament (minimum of 1 title)	(Spain) Lilí Álvarez	(4–0) (1930)
Undefeated at this tournament (minimum of 1 title)	(United States) Helen Jacobs	(4–0) (1934)
Undefeated at this tournament (minimum of 1 title)	(Denmark) Hilde Krahwinkel Sperling	(4–0) (1935)

Longest final

1962 (36 games)
(Australia) Margaret Court	8	5	6
(Brazil) Maria Bueno	6	7	4

Shortest completed final

2021 (12 games)
(Poland) Iga Świątek	6	6
(Czech Republic) Karolína Plíšková	0	0

=== Women's doubles ===
	Individual		Team	
Most titles	(United Kingdom) Virginia Wade	4	(Australia) Thelma Coyne Long (Australia) Mary Hawton	2
Most titles	(United Kingdom) Virginia Wade	4	(Argentina) Paola Suárez (Spain) Virginia Ruano Pascual	2
Most titles	(United Kingdom) Virginia Wade	4	(Chinese Taipei) Hsieh Su-wei (China) Peng Shuai	2
Most titles	(United Kingdom) Virginia Wade	4	(Italy) Sara Errani (Italy) Jasmine Paolini	2
Most finals	(Australia) Thelma Coyne Long	5	(Italy) Silvana Lazzarino (Italy) Lea Pericoli	5
Most finals	(Italy) Silvana Lazzarino	5	(Italy) Silvana Lazzarino (Italy) Lea Pericoli	5
Most finals	(Italy) Lea Pericoli	5	(Italy) Silvana Lazzarino (Italy) Lea Pericoli	5
Most finals	(United Kingdom) Virginia Wade	5	(Italy) Silvana Lazzarino (Italy) Lea Pericoli	5
Most finals	(Romania) Virginia Ruzici	5	(Italy) Silvana Lazzarino (Italy) Lea Pericoli	5
Most finals	(Switzerland) Martina Hingis	5	(Italy) Silvana Lazzarino (Italy) Lea Pericoli	5
Most finals	(Italy) Sara Errani	5	(Italy) Silvana Lazzarino (Italy) Lea Pericoli	5
Most runner-ups	(Italy) Silvana Lazzarino	5	(Italy) Silvana Lazzarino (Italy) Lea Pericoli	5
Most runner-ups	(Italy) Lea Pericoli	5	(Italy) Silvana Lazzarino (Italy) Lea Pericoli	5
Most consecutive titles	(Soviet Union) Olga Morozova (1972, 1973, 1974)	3	(Australia) Thelma Coyne Long (Australia) Mary Hawton (1956, 1957)	2
Most consecutive titles	(Socialist Federal Republic of Yugoslavia) / (Federal Republic of Yugoslavia) Monica Seles (1990, 1991, 1992)	3	(United States) Gigi Fernández (Belarus) Natasha Zvereva (1994, 1995)	2
Most consecutive titles	(Socialist Federal Republic of Yugoslavia) / (Federal Republic of Yugoslavia) Monica Seles (1990, 1991, 1992)	3	(Italy) Sara Errani (Italy) Jasmine Paolini (2024, 2025)	2
Most consecutive finals	(Italy) Silvana Lazzarino (1962–1965)	4	(Italy) Silvana Lazzarino (Italy) Lea Pericoli (1962–1965)	4
Most consecutive finals	(Italy) Lea Pericoli (1962–1965)	4	(Italy) Silvana Lazzarino (Italy) Lea Pericoli (1962–1965)	4
Most consecutive runner-ups	(Italy) Silvana Lazzarino (1962–1965)	4	(Italy) Silvana Lazzarino (Italy) Lea Pericoli (1962–1965)	4
Most consecutive runner-ups	(Italy) Lea Pericoli (1962–1965)	4	(Italy) Silvana Lazzarino (Italy) Lea Pericoli (1962–1965)	4

Longest final

1956 (40 games)
(Australia) Thelma Coyne Long (Australia) Mary Hawton	6	6	9
(United States) Darlene Hard (United Kingdom) Angela Buxton	4	8	7

Shortest completed finals

1957 (14 games)
(Australia) Thelma Coyne Long (Australia) Mary Bevis Hawton	6	6
(Mexico) Rosa Reyes (Mexico) Yola Ramírez	1	1

2001 (14 games)
(Zimbabwe) Cara Black (Russia) Elena Likhovtseva	6	6
(Argentina) Paola Suárez (Argentina) Patricia Tarabini	1	1

== See also ==
- Category:National and multi-national tennis tournaments

Awards and achievements
Preceded by Dubai Tennis Championships	Favorite WTA Premier 5 Tournament; 2016–2017	Succeeded by Incumbent
