= 1982 Italian Open (tennis) =

- Date: 17–21 May (men); 3–9 May (women)
- Edition: 39th
- Surface: Clay / outdoor
- Location: Rome, Italy (men); Perugia, Italy (women)
- Venue: Foro Italico (men)

Champions

Men's singles
- (Ecuador) Andrés Gómez

Women's singles
- (United States) Chris Evert Lloyd

Men's doubles
- (Switzerland) Heinz Günthardt / (Hungary) Balázs Taróczy

Women's doubles
- (United States) Kathleen Horvath / (South Africa) Yvonne Vermaak
- Italian Open

The 1982 Italian Open was a tennis tournament that was played by men on outdoor clay courts at the Foro Italico in Rome, Italy and was part of the 1982 Volvo Grand Prix. The women's tournament was played on outdoor clay courts in Perugia, Italy and was part of the Toyota Series of the 1982 WTA Tour. The men's tournament was held from 17 May through 21 May 1982, while the women's tournament was played from 3 May through 9 May 1982. Andrés Gómez and Chris Evert Lloyd won the singles titles.

== Finals ==
=== Men's singles ===
(Ecuador) Andrés Gómez defeated (United States) Eliot Teltscher 6–2, 6–3, 6–2

- It was Gómez's 1st singles title of the year and the 2nd of his career.

=== Women's singles ===
(United States) Chris Evert Lloyd defeated (Czechoslovakia) Hana Mandlíková 6–0, 6–3

- It was Evert Lloyd's 3rd singles title of the year and the 113th of her career.

=== Men's doubles ===
(Switzerland) Heinz Günthardt / (Hungary) Balázs Taróczy defeated (Poland) Wojciech Fibak / (Australia) John Fitzgerald 6–4, 4–6, 6–3

=== Women's doubles ===
(United States) Kathleen Horvath / (South Africa) Yvonne Vermaak defeated (United States) Billie Jean King / (South Africa) Ilana Kloss 2–6, 6–4, 7–6
