= 1984 Italian Open (tennis) =

- Date: 21–27 May
- Edition: 41st
- Prize money: $300,000 (men) $150,000 (women)
- Surface: Clay / outdoor
- Location: Rome, Italy (men); Perugia, Italy (women)
- Venue: Foro Italico (men)

Champions

Men's singles
- (Ecuador) Andrés Gómez

Women's singles
- (Bulgaria) Manuela Maleeva

Men's doubles
- (United States) Ken Flach / (United States) Robert Seguso

Women's doubles
- (Czechoslovakia) Iva Budařová / (Czechoslovakia) Helena Suková
- Italian Open

The 1984 Italian Open was a tennis tournament played on outdoor clay courts in Italy that was part of the 1984 Volvo Grand Prix and the 1984 Virginia Slims World Championship Series. The men's tournament was held in Rome while the women's tournament was held in Perugia from 21 May through 27 May 1984. Andrés Gómez and Manuela Maleeva won the singles titles.

== Finals ==
=== Men's singles ===
(Ecuador) Andrés Gómez defeated (United States) Aaron Krickstein 2–6, 6–1, 6–2, 6–2

- It was Gómez's 2nd singles title of the year and the 6th of his career.

=== Women's singles ===
(Bulgaria) Manuela Maleeva defeated (United States) Chris Evert 6–3, 6–3

- It was Maleeva's 2nd singles title of the year and of her career.

=== Men's doubles ===
(United States) Ken Flach / (United States) Robert Seguso defeated (Australia) John Alexander / (United States) Mike Leach 3–6, 6–3, 6–4

=== Women's doubles ===
(Czechoslovakia) Iva Budařová / (Czechoslovakia) Helena Suková defeated (Soviet Union) Kathleen Horvath / (Romania) Virginia Ruzici 7–6^{(7–5)}, 1–6, 6–4
