= Tonino Zugarelli =

Italian tennis player

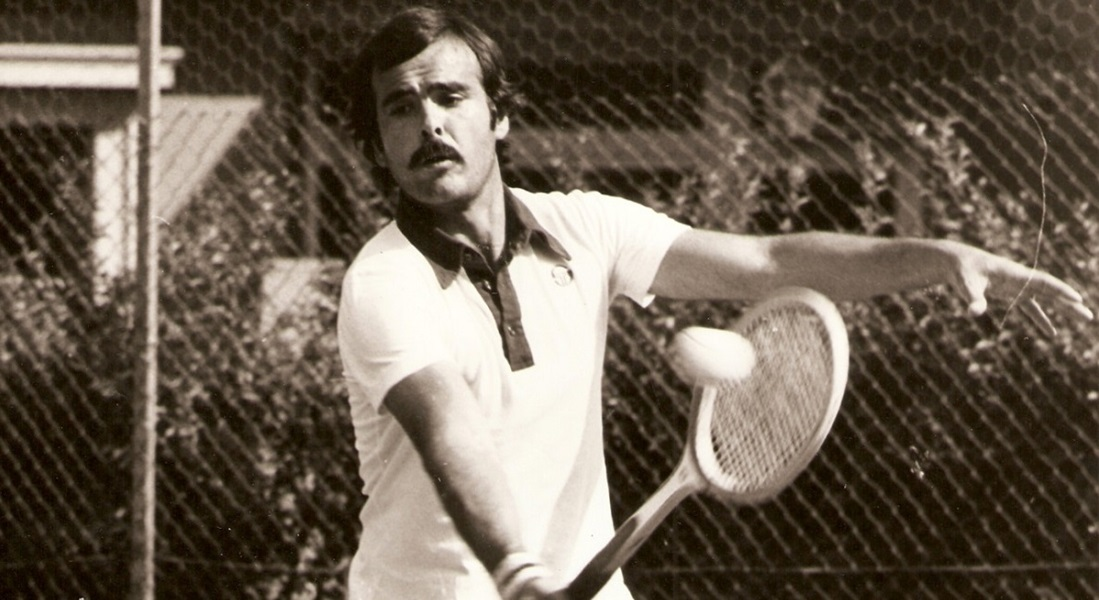
- Native name: Antonio Zugarelli
- Country (sports): Italy
- Residence: Rome, Italy
- Born: 17 January 1950 (age 76) Rome, Italy
- Turned pro: 1969
- Retired: 1983
- Plays: Right-handed

Singles
- Career record: 104–145
- Career titles: 1
- Highest ranking: No. 24 (12 June 1977)

Grand Slam singles results
- French Open: 4R (1975)
- Wimbledon: 2R (1973, 1978)
- US Open: 1R (1973)

Doubles
- Career record: 57–99
- Career titles: 1

Team competitions
- Davis Cup: W (1976)
Medal record
Mediterranean Games
Bronze medal – third place	1971 İzmir	Doubles

Antonio "Tonino" Zugarelli (Italian pronunciation: [toˈniːno ddzuɡaˈrɛlli]; born 17 January 1950) is a former professional tennis player from Italy.

Zugarelli won 1 singles and 1 doubles title on the Grand Prix tennis tour during his career. He was also a member of the Italian team that won the 1976 Davis Cup.

== Grand Prix circuit finals ==
=== Singles (1 title, 1 runner-up) ===
Result	W/L	Date	Tournament	Surface	Opponent	Score
Win	1–0	Jul 1976	Båstad, Sweden	Clay	(Italy) Corrado Barazzutti	4–6, 7–5, 6–2
Loss	1–1	May 1977	Rome, Italy	Clay	(United States) Vitas Gerulaitis	2–6, 6–7, 6–3, 6–7

=== Doubles (1 title, 5 runner-ups) ===
Result	W/L	Date	Tournament	Surface	Partner	Opponents	Score
Loss	0–1	Mar 1975	Munich WCT, Germany	Carpet	(Italy) Corrado Barazzutti	(South Africa) Bob Hewitt (South Africa) Frew McMillan	3–6, 4–6
Loss	0–2	Mar 1976	Valencia, Spain	Clay	(Italy) Corrado Barazzutti	(Spain) Juan Gisbert Sr. (Spain) Manuel Orantes	1–6, 4–6
Loss	0–3	Jan 1978	Baltimore, U.S.	Carpet	(United Kingdom) Roger Taylor	(South Africa) Frew McMillan (United States) Fred McNair	3–6, 5–7
Win	1–3	Jun 1978	Brussels, Belgium	Clay	(France) Jean-Louis Haillet	(New Zealand) Onny Parun (Czechoslovakia) Vladimír Zedník	6–3, 4–6, 7–5
Loss	1–4	Nov 1978	Bologna, Italy	Carpet	(France) Jean-Louis Haillet	(United States) Peter Fleming (United States) John McEnroe	1–6, 4–6
Loss	1–5	Jul 1979	Kitzbühel, Austria	Clay	(Australia) Dick Crealy	(Socialist Federal Republic of Yugoslavia) Željko Franulović (Switzerland) Heinz Günthardt	2–6, 4–6

== See also ==
- Tennis in Italy
