= Ilie Năstase career statistics =

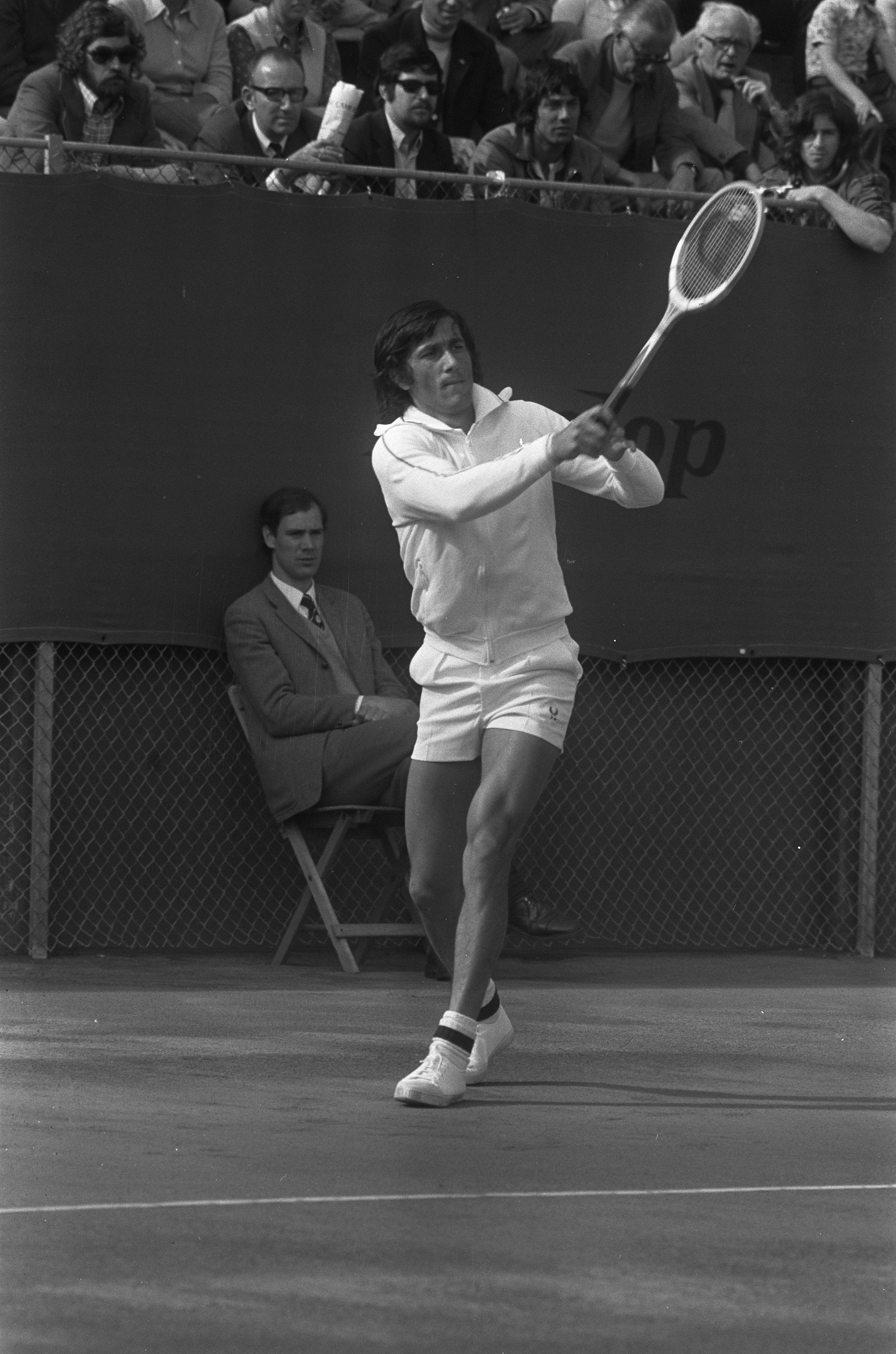
Năstase playing a Davis Cup match against The Netherlands in The Hague (1973)

These are the main career statistics of Romanian former professional tennis player Ilie Năstase, whose playing career lasted from 1969 through 1985.

== Grand Slam finals ==
=== Singles: 5 (2 titles, 3 runner-ups) ===
Result	Year	Championship	Surface	Opponent	Score
Loss	1971	French Open	Clay	(Czechoslovakia) Jan Kodeš	6–8, 2–6, 6–2, 5–7
Loss	1972	Wimbledon	Grass	(United States) Stan Smith	6–4, 3–6, 3–6, 6–4, 5–7
Win	1972	US Open	Grass	(United States) Arthur Ashe	3–6, 6–3, 6–7^{(1–5)}, 6–4, 6–3
Win	1973	French Open	Clay	(Socialist Federal Republic of Yugoslavia) Nikola Pilić	6–3, 6–3, 6–0
Loss	1976	Wimbledon	Grass	(Sweden) Björn Borg	4–6, 2–6, 7–9

=== Doubles: 5 (3 titles, 2 runner-ups) ===
Result	Year	Championship	Surface	Partner	Opponents	Score
Loss	1966	French Championships	Clay	(Romania) Ion Țiriac	(United States) Clark Graebner (United States) Dennis Ralston	3–6, 3–6, 0–6
Win	1970	French Open	Clay	(Romania) Ion Țiriac	(United States) Arthur Ashe (United States) Charlie Pasarell	6–2, 6–4, 6–3
Loss	1973	French Open	Clay	(United States) Jimmy Connors	(Australia) John Newcombe (Netherlands) Tom Okker	1–6, 6–3, 3–6, 7–5, 4–6
Win	1973	Wimbledon	Grass	(United States) Jimmy Connors	(Australia) John Cooper (Australia) Neale Fraser	3–6, 6–3, 6–4, 8–9^{(3)}, 6–1
Win	1975	US Open	Clay	(United States) Jimmy Connors	(Netherlands) Tom Okker (United States) Marty Riessen	6–4, 7–6

=== Mixed doubles: 3 (2 titles, 1 runner-up) ===
Result	Year	Championship	Surface	Partner	Opponents	Score
Win	1970	Wimbledon	Grass	(United States) Rosemary Casals	(Soviet Union) Olga Morozova (Soviet Union) Alex Metreveli	6–3, 4–6, 9–7
Win	1972	Wimbledon	Grass	(United States) Rosemary Casals	(Australia) Evonne Goolagong (Australia) Kim Warwick	6–4, 6–4
Loss	1972	US Open	Grass	(United States) Rosemary Casals	(Australia) Margaret Court (United States) Marty Riessen	3–6, 5–7

== Grand Prix year-end championships finals ==
=== Singles: 5 (4 titles, 1 runner-up) ===
Result	Year	Championship	Surface	Opponent	Score
Win	1971	Grand Prix Masters	Hard (i)	(United States) Stan Smith	Round robin
Win	1972	Grand Prix Masters	Hard (i)	(United States) Stan Smith	6–3, 6–2, 3–6, 2–6, 6–3
Win	1973	Grand Prix Masters	Hard (i)	(Netherlands) Tom Okker	6–3, 7–5, 4–6, 6–3
Loss	1974	Grand Prix Masters	Grass	(Argentina) Guillermo Vilas	6–7^{(6–8)}, 2–6, 6–3, 6–3, 4–6
Win	1975	Grand Prix Masters	Carpet (i)	(Sweden) Björn Borg	6–2, 6–2, 6–1

== ATP Career finals ==
=== Singles: 105 (64 titles, 41 runner-ups) ===
Legend Grand Slam tournaments (2–3) Year-end championships – Grand Prix (4–1) ITF Independent / Grand Prix / WCT (58–37)	Finals by surface Clay (31–18) Grass (3–4) Hard (11–7) Carpet (19–12)	Finals by setting Outdoor (38–26) Indoor (26–15)

Result	No.	Date	Tournament	Surface	Opponent	Score
Loss	1.	1968	Parioli, Rome	Clay	(Romania) Ion Țiriac	7–9, 3–6, 4–6
Loss	2.	1968	Reggio Calabria, Italy	Clay	(United States) Marty Riessen	6–3, 6–3, 3–6, 4–6, 2–6
Win	1.	1969	Colombia International, Barranquilla	Clay	(Czechoslovakia) Jan Kodeš	6–4, 6–4, 8–10, 2–6, 6–3
Win	2.	1969	Denver Tournament, United States	Hard (i)	(United States) Stan Smith	6–4, 6–5
Loss	3.	1969	Stockholm Open, Sweden	Hard (i)	(Socialist Federal Republic of Yugoslavia) Nikola Pilić	4–6, 6–4, 2–6
Win	3.	1970	U.S. National Indoor Championships, Salisbury	Hard (i)	(United States) Cliff Richey	6–8, 3–6, 6–4, 9–7, 6–0
Win	4.	1970	Italian Open, Rome	Clay	(Czechoslovakia) Jan Kodeš	6–3, 1–6, 6–3, 8–6
Loss	4.	1970	Belgian Open Championships, Brussels	Clay	(Netherlands) Tom Okker	3–6, 4–6, 6–0, 6–4, 4–6
Loss	5.	1970	German Open Tennis Championships, Hamburg	Clay	(Netherlands) Tom Okker	6–4, 3–6, 3–6, 4–6
Win	5.	1971	Omaha Open, United States	Carpet (i)	(United States) Cliff Richey	6–4, 6–3, 6–1
Win	6.	1971	Richmond WCT, United States	Carpet (i)	(United States) Arthur Ashe	3–6, 6–2, 6–4
Loss	6.	1971	Macon Open, United States	Carpet (i)	(Socialist Federal Republic of Yugoslavia) Željko Franulović	4–6, 5–7, 7–5, 6–3, 6–7
Win	7.	1971	Hampton Grand Prix, United States	Carpet (i)	(United States) Clark Graebner	7–5, 6–4, 7–6
Win	8.	1971	Nice International Championships, France	Clay	(Czechoslovakia) Jan Kodeš	10–8, 11–9, 6–1
Win	9.	1971	Monte Carlo Open, Monaco	Clay	(Netherlands) Tom Okker	3–6, 8–6, 6–1, 6–1
Loss	7.	1971	Madrid-2 Tournament, Spain	Clay	(Romania) Ion Țiriac	5–7, 1–6, 0–6
Loss	8.	1971	Belgian Open Championships, Brussels	Clay	(South Africa) Cliff Drysdale	0–6, 1–6, 5–7
Loss	9.	1971	French Open, Paris	Clay	(Czechoslovakia) Jan Kodeš	6–8, 2–6, 6–2, 5–7
Win	10.	1971	Swedish Open, Båstad	Clay	(Denmark) Jan Leschly	6–7, 6–2, 6–1, 6–4
Win	11.	1971	Wembley Championships, London	Carpet (i)	(Australia) Rod Laver	3–6, 6–3, 3–6, 6–4, 6–4
Loss	10.	1971	South American Open, Buenos Aires	Clay	(Socialist Federal Republic of Yugoslavia) Željko Franulović	3–6, 6–7, 1–6
Win	12.	1971	Masters, Paris	Hard (i)	(United States) Stan Smith	Round robin
Win	13.	1972	Baltimore International, United States	Carpet (i)	(United States) Jimmy Connors	1–6, 6–4, 7–6
Win	14.	1972	Omaha Open, United States (2)	Carpet (i)	(Romania) Ion Țiriac	2–6, 6–0, 6–1
Loss	11.	1972	U.S. National Indoor Championships, Salisbury	Carpet (i)	(United States) Stan Smith	7–5, 2–6, 3–6, 4–6
Loss	12.	1972	Hampton Grand Prix, United States	Carpet (i)	(United States) Stan Smith	3–6, 2–6, 7–6, 4–6
Win	15.	1972	Monte Carlo Open, Monaco (2)	Clay	(Czechoslovakia) František Pála	6–1, 6–0, 6–3
Win	16.	1972	Madrid Tennis Grand Prix, Spain	Clay	(Czechoslovakia) František Pála	6–0, 6–0, 6–1
Win	17.	1972	Nice International Championships (2)	Clay	(Czechoslovakia) Jan Kodeš	6–0, 6–4, 6–3
Loss	13.	1972	Wimbledon Championships, London	Grass	(United States) Stan Smith	6–4, 3–6, 3–6, 6–4, 5–7
Loss	14.	1972	Swedish Open, Båstad	Clay	(Spain) Manuel Orantes	4–6, 3–6, 1–6
Win	18.	1972	Düsseldorf Grand Prix, West Germany	Clay	(West Germany) Jürgen Fassbender	6–0, 6–2, 6–1
Win	19.	1972	Rothmans Canadian Open, Toronto	Clay	(Rhodesia) Andrew Pattison	6–4, 6–3
Win	20.	1972	South Orange Open, United States	Grass	(Spain) Manuel Orantes	6–4, 6–4
Win	21.	1972	US Open, New York	Grass	(United States) Arthur Ashe	3–6, 6–3, 6–7, 6–4, 6–3
Win	22.	1972	Rainier International Tennis Classic, Seattle	Carpet (i)	(United States) Tom Gorman	6–4, 3–6, 6–3
Win	23.	1972	Dewar Cup, London	Carpet (i)	(United States) Tom Gorman	6–4, 6–3
Win	24.	1972	Masters, Barcelona (2)	Hard (i)	(United States) Stan Smith	6–3, 6–2, 3–6, 2–6, 6–3
Win	25.	1973	Omaha Open, United States (3)	Carpet (i)	(United States) Jimmy Connors	5–0, ret.
Win	26.	1973	Calgary Indoor, Canada	Hard (i)	(United States) Paul Gerken	6–4, 7–6
Loss	15.	1973	Hampton Grand Prix, United States	Carpet (i)	(United States) Jimmy Connors	6–4, 3–6, 5–7, 3–6
Win	27.	1973	Washington-2 Tournament, United States	Carpet (i)	(United States) Jimmy Connors	4–6, 6–4, 6–2, 5–7, 6–2
Win	28.	1973	Barcelona-2 Tournament, Spain	Clay	(Italy) Adriano Panatta	6–1, 3–6, 6–1, 6–2
Win	29.	1973	Monte Carlo Open, Monaco (3)	Clay	(Sweden) Björn Borg	6–4, 6–1, 6–2
Win	30.	1973	Madrid-2 Tournament, Spain	Clay	(Italy) Adriano Panatta	6–3, 7–6, 5–7, 6–1
Win	31.	1973	Dunhill Florence, Italy	Clay	(Italy) Adriano Panatta	6–3, 3–6, 0–6, 7–6, 6–4
Loss	16.	1973	British Hard Court Championships, Bournemouth	Clay	(Italy) Adriano Panatta	8–6, 5–7, 3–6
Win	32.	1973	French Open, Paris	Clay	(Socialist Federal Republic of Yugoslavia) Nikola Pilić	6–3, 6–3, 6–0
Win	33.	1973	Italian Open, Rome (2)	Clay	(Spain) Manuel Orantes	6–1, 6–1, 6–1
Win	34.	1973	Queen's Club Championships, London	Grass	(United Kingdom) Roger Taylor	9–8, 6–3
Win	35.	1973	Swiss Open, Gstaad	Clay	(Australia) Roy Emerson	6–4, 6–3, 6–3
Win	36.	1973	Cincinnati Open, United States	Clay	(Spain) Manuel Orantes	5–7, 6–3, 6–4
Win	37.	1973	Barcelona Open, Spain	Clay	(Spain) Manuel Orantes	2–6, 6–1, 8–6, 6–4
Win	38.	1973	Paris Open, France	Hard (i)	(United States) Stan Smith	4–6, 6–1, 3–6, 6–0, 6–2
Loss	17.	1973	Dewar Cup, London	Carpet (i)	(Netherlands) Tom Okker	3–6, 4–6
Win	39	1973	Masters, Boston (3)	Hard (i)	(Netherlands) Tom Okker	6–3, 7–5, 4–6, 6–3
Win	40.	1973	Kingston Tennis Tournament, Jamaica	Hard (i)	(United States) Brian Gottfried	6–1, 6–7, 6–3
Win	41.	1974	Richmond WCT, United States (2)	Carpet (i)	(United States) Tom Gorman	6–2, 6–3
Loss	18.	1974	Toronto Indoor, Canada	Carpet (i)	(Netherlands) Tom Okker	3–6, 4–6
Loss	19.	1974	Hampton Grand Prix, United States	Carpet (i)	(United States) Jimmy Connors	4–6, 4–6
Win	42.	1974	Washington Indoor, United States	Carpet (i)	(Netherlands) Tom Okker	6–3, 6–3
Loss	20.	1974	Monte Carlo WCT, Monaco	Clay	(Rhodesia) Andrew Pattison	7–5, 3–6, 4–6
Win	43.	1974	British Hard Court Championships, Bournemouth	Clay	(Italy) Paolo Bertolucci	6–1, 6–3, 6–2
Loss	21.	1974	Italian Open, Rome	Clay	(Sweden) Björn Borg	3–6, 4–6, 2–6
Win	44.	1974	Cedar Grove Open, United States	Clay	(Spain) Juan Gisbert Sr.	6–4, 7–6
Win	45.	1974	Madrid Tennis Grand Prix, Spain (2)	Clay	(Sweden) Björn Borg	6–4, 5–7, 6–2, 4–6, 6–4
Win	46.	1974	Barcelona Open, Spain (2)	Clay	(Spain) Manuel Orantes	8–6, 9–7, 6–3
Win	47.	1974	World Invitational Tennis Classic, Hilton Head	Carpet	(Sweden) Bjorn Börg	7–6, 6–3
Loss	22.	1974	Masters, Melbourne	Grass	(Argentina) Guillermo Vilas	6–7, 2–6, 6–3, 6–3, 4–6
Loss	23.	1975	Swiss Indoors, Basel	Hard (i)	(Czechoslovakia) Jiří Hřebec	1–6, 6–7, 6–2, 3–6
Loss	24	1975	American Airlines Tennis Games, Tucson	Hard	(Australia) John Alexander	5–7, 2–6
Win	48.	1975	Barcelona-2 Tournament, Spain (2)	Clay	(Spain) Juan Gisbert Sr.	6–1, 7–5, 6–2
Win	49.	1975	Valencia Tennis Tournament, Spain	Clay	(Spain) Manuel Orantes	6–3, 6–0
Win	50.	1975	Madrid-2 Tournament, Spain (2)	Clay	(Spain) Manuel Orantes	7–6, 6–1, 2–6, 6–3
Loss	25.	1975	Louisville Open, United States	Clay	(Argentina) Guillermo Vilas	4–6, 3–6
Loss	26.	1975	Rothmans Canadian Open, Toronto	Clay	(Spain) Manuel Orantes	6–7, 0–6, 1–6
Win	51.	1975	South Orange Open, United States (2)	Clay	(South Africa) Bob Hewitt	7–6, 6–1
Win	52.	1974	World Invitational Tennis Classic, Hilton Head	Clay	(Australia) Rod Laver	5–7, 7–6, 6–4
Win	53.	1975	Masters, Stockholm (4)	Carpet (i)	(Sweden) Björn Borg	6–2, 6–2, 6–1
Win	54.	1976	Atlanta WCT, United States	Carpet (i)	(United States) Jeff Borowiak	6–2, 6–4
Loss	27.	1976	Baltimore International, United States	Carpet (i)	(United States) Tom Gorman	5–7, 3–6
Win	55.	1976	U.S. National Indoor Championships, Salisbury (2)	Carpet (i)	(United States) Jimmy Connors	6–2, 6–3, 7–6
Loss	28.	1976	Hampton Grand Prix, United States	Carpet (i)	(United States) Jimmy Connors	2–6, 2–6, 2–6
Win	56.	1976	La Costa WCT, United States	Hard	(United States) Jimmy Connors	4–6, 6–0, 6–1
Loss	29.	1976	Caracas WCT, Venezuela	Hard	(Mexico) Raúl Ramírez	3–6, 4–6
Loss	30.	1976	Stockholm WCT, Sweden	Carpet (i)	(Poland) Wojtek Fibak	4–6, 6–7
Win	57.	1976	WCT Challenge Cup, Honolulu	Hard	(United States) Arthur Ashe	6–3, 1–6, 6–7, 6–3, 6–1
Loss	31.	1976	Nottingham Open, England	Grass	(United States) Jimmy Connors	2–6, 6–4, 1–1 (abandoned, rain)
Loss	32.	1976	Wimbledon Championships, London	Grass	(Sweden) Björn Borg	4–6, 2–6, 7–9
Win	58.	1976	Pepsi Grand Slam, Myrtle Beach	Clay	(Spain) Manuel Orantes	6–4, 6–3
Win	59.	1976	South Orange Open, United States (3)	Clay	(United States) Roscoe Tanner	6–4, 6–2
Loss	33.	1976	Hong Kong Open, Causeway Bay	Hard	(Australia) Ken Rosewall	6–1, 4–6, 6–7, 0–6
Win	60.	1977	Mexico City WCT, Mexico	Carpet (i)	(Poland) Wojtek Fibak	4–6, 6–2, 7–6
Loss	34.	1977	ABN World Tennis Tournament, Rotterdam	Carpet (i)	(United States) Dick Stockton	6–2, 3–6, 3–6
Win	61.	1977	WCT Challenge Cup, Las Vegas (2)	Carpet (i)	(United States) Jimmy Connors	3–6, 7–6, 6–4, 7–5
Loss	35.	1977	Virginia Beach Tennis Tournament, United States	Clay	(Argentina) Guillermo Vilas	2–6, 6–4, 2–6
Win	62.	1977	Aix-en-Provence Open, France	Clay	(Argentina) Guillermo Vilas	6–1, 7–5, ret.
Win	63.	1978	Miami Open, United States	Carpet (i)	(United States) Tom Gullikson	6–3, 7–5
Loss	36.	1978	River Oaks International Tennis Tournament, Houston	Clay	(United States) Brian Gottfried	6–3, 2–6, 1–6
Loss	37.	1978	WCT Invitational, Forest Hills	Clay	(United States) Vitas Gerulaitis	2–6, 0–6
Loss	38.	1978	Barcelona Open, Spain	Clay	(Hungary) Balázs Taróczy	6–1, 5–7, 6–4, 3–6, 4–6
Win	64.	1978	WCT Challenge Cup, Montego Bay (3)	Hard	(United States) Peter Fleming	2–6, 5–6, 6–2, 6–4, 6–4
Loss	39.	1979	Grand Prix Cleveland, United States	Hard	(United States) Stan Smith	6–7, 5–7
Loss	40.	1981	Lorraine Open, Nancy	Hard (i)	(Czechoslovakia) Pavel Složil	2–6, 5–7
Loss	41.	1981	Bologna Indoor, Italy	Carpet (i)	(United States) Sandy Mayer	5–7, 3–6

Sources

- Michel Sutter, Vainqueurs Winners 1946–2003, Paris, 2003. Sutter has attempted to list all tournaments meeting his criteria for selection beginning with 1946 and ending in the fall of 1991. For each tournament, he has indicated the city, the date of the final, the winner, the runner-up, and the score of the final. A tournament is included in his list if: (1) the draw for the tournament included at least eight players (with a few exceptions, such as the Pepsi Grand Slam tournaments in the second half of the 1970s); and (2) the level of the tournaments was at least equal to the present day challenger tournaments. Later, Sutter issued a second edition of his book, with only the players, their wins, and years from 1946 to 27 April 2003, period.
- John Barrett, editor, World of Tennis Yearbooks, London, from 1976 to 1983.
- Joe McCauley in Mr Nastase: The Autobiography, by Ilie Năstase with Debbie Beckerman, 2004.
- 1982 WCT Yearbook
- ATP Official Guide to Professional Tennis 2004 (page G18).

=== Doubles (45 titles ) ===
No.	Year	Tournament	Surface	Partner	Opponents	Score
1.	1970	Philadelphia WCT, U.S.	Carpet (i)	(Romania) Ion Țiriac	(United States) Arthur Ashe (United States) Dennis Ralston	6–4, 6–3
2.	1970	French Open, Paris	Clay	(Romania) Ion Țiriac	(United States) Arthur Ashe (United States) Charlie Pasarell	6–2, 6–4, 6–3
3.	1970	Rome, Italy	Clay	(Romania) Ion Țiriac	(Australia) William Bowrey (Australia) Owen Davidson	0–6, 10–8, 6–3, 6–8, 6–1
4.	1970	Cincinnati, U.S.	Clay	(Romania) Ion Țiriac	(South Africa) Bob Hewitt (South Africa) Frew McMillan	6–3, 6–4
5.	1971	Hampton, U.S.	Hard (i)	(Romania) Ion Țiriac	(United States) Clark Graebner (Brazil) Thomaz Koch	6–4, 4–6, 7–5
6.	1971	Monte Carlo, Monaco	Clay	(Romania) Ion Țiriac	(Netherlands) Tom Okker (United Kingdom) Roger Taylor	1–6, 6–3, 6–3, 8–6
7.	1971	Buenos Aires, Argentina	Clay	(Socialist Federal Republic of Yugoslavia) Željko Franulović	(Chile) Patricio Cornejo (Chile) Jaime Fillol	6–4, 6–4
8.	1972	Kansas City, U.S.	Indoor	(Romania) Ion Țiriac	(Spain) Andrés Gimeno (Spain) Manuel Orantes	6–7, 6–4, 7–6
9.	1972	Hampton, U.S.	Hard (i)	(Romania) Ion Țiriac	(Spain) Andrés Gimeno (Spain) Manuel Orantes	6–4, 7–6
10.	1972	Madrid, Spain	Clay	(United States) Stan Smith	(Spain) Andrés Gimeno (Spain) Manuel Orantes	6–2, 6–2
11.	1972	Rome, Italy	Clay	(Romania) Ion Țiriac	(Australia) Lew Hoad (South Africa) Frew McMillan	3–6, 3–6, 6–4, 6–3, 5–3 ret.
12.	1972	Hamburg, Germany	Clay	(Czechoslovakia) Jan Kodeš	(South Africa) Bob Hewitt (Romania) Ion Țiriac	4–6, 6–0, 3–6, 6–2, 6–2
13.	1972	Montreal, Canada	Clay	(Romania) Ion Țiriac	(Czechoslovakia) Jan Kodeš (Czechoslovakia) Jan Kukal	7–6, 6–3
14.	1973	Salisbury, U.S.	Hard (i)	(United States) Clark Graebner	(West Germany) Jürgen Fassbender (Spain) Juan Gisbert	6–2, 6–4
15.	1973	Calgary, Canada	Indoor	(United States) Mike Estep	(Hungary) Szabolcs Baranyi (Hungary) Péter Szőke	7–6, 6–3
16.	1973	Hampton, U.S.	Hard (i)	(United States) Clark Graebner	(United States) Jimmy Connors (Romania) Ion Țiriac	6–2, 6–1
17.	1973	Monte Carlo, Monaco	Clay	(Spain) Juan Gisbert	(France) Georges Goven (France) Patrick Proisy	6–4, 5–7, 6–4
18.	1973	Wimbledon, London	Grass	(United States) Jimmy Connors	(Australia) John Cooper (Australia) Neale Fraser	3–6, 6–3, 6–4, 8–9, 6–1
19.	1973	South Orange, U.S.	Hard	(United States) Jimmy Connors	(United States) Pancho Gonzales (United States) Tom Gorman	6–7, 6–3, 6–2
20.	1973	Barcelona, Spain	Clay	(Netherlands) Tom Okker	(Spain) Antonio Muñoz (Spain) Manuel Orantes	4–6, 6–3, 6–2
21.	1973	Madrid, Spain	Clay	(Netherlands) Tom Okker	(Australia) Bob Carmichael (South Africa) Frew McMillan	2–6, 6–3, 7–5
22.	1973	Paris, France	Hard (i)	(Spain) Juan Gisbert	(United States) Arthur Ashe (United States) Roscoe Tanner	6–3, 6–4
23.	1973	Stockholm, Sweden	Hard (i)	(United States) Jimmy Connors	(Australia) Bob Carmichael (South Africa) Frew McMillan	7–6, 7–5
24.	1974	Bournemouth, England	Clay	(Spain) Juan Gisbert	(Italy) Corrado Barazzutti (Italy) Paolo Bertolucci	6–2, 7–5
25.	1974	Indianapolis, U.S.	Clay	(United States) Jimmy Connors	(West Germany) Jürgen Fassbender (West Germany) Hans-Jürgen Pohmann	6–7, 6–3, 6–4
26.	1974	Barcelona, Spain	Clay	(Spain) Juan Gisbert	(Spain) Manuel Orantes (Argentina) Guillermo Vilas	3–6, 6–0, 6–2
27.	1974	London, England	Carpet (i)	(United States) Jimmy Connors	(United States) Brian Gottfried (Mexico) Raúl Ramírez	3–6, 7–6, 6–3
28.	1975	Salisbury, U.S.	Carpet (i)	(United States) Jimmy Connors	(Czechoslovakia) Jan Kodeš (United Kingdom) Roger Taylor	4–6, 6–3, 6–3
29.	1975	South Orange, U.S.	Clay	(United States) Jimmy Connors	(Australia) Dick Crealy (United Kingdom) John Lloyd	7–6, 7–5
30.	1975	US Open, New York	Clay	(United States) Jimmy Connors	(Netherlands) Tom Okker (United States) Marty Riessen	6–4, 6–4
31.	1975	Madrid, Spain	Clay	(Czechoslovakia) Jan Kodeš	(Spain) Juan Gisbert (Spain) Manuel Orantes	7–6, 4–6, 9–7
32.	1976	Stockholm WCT, Sweden	Carpet (i)	(Soviet Union) Alex Metreveli	(Netherlands) Tom Okker (Italy) Adriano Panatta	6–4, 7–5
33.	1977	St. Louis WCT, U.S.	Carpet	(Italy) Adriano Panatta	(India) Vijay Amritraj (United States) Dick Stockton	6–4, 3–6, 7–6
34.	1977	London WCT, England	Hard (i)	(Italy) Adriano Panatta	(United Kingdom) Mark Cox (United States) Eddie Dibbs	7–6, 6–7, 6–3
35.	1977	Houston WCT, U.S.	Hard	(Italy) Adriano Panatta	(Australia) John Alexander (Australia) Phil Dent	6–3, 6–4
36.	1977	Aix-en-Provence, France	Clay	(Romania) Ion Țiriac	(France) Patrice Dominguez (Sweden) Rolf Norberg	7–5, 7–6
37.	1979	Sarasota, U.S.	Carpet (i)	(Israel) Steve Krulevitz	(Australia) John James (United States) Keith Richardson	7–6, 6–3
38.	1979	Monte Carlo, Monaco	Clay	(Mexico) Raúl Ramírez	(Paraguay) Víctor Pecci (Hungary) Balázs Taróczy	6–3, 6–4
39.	1979	Cincinnati, U.S.	Hard	(United States) Brian Gottfried	(United States) Bob Lutz (United States) Stan Smith	1–6, 6–3, 7–6
40.	1979	Atlanta, U.S.	Hard	(South Africa) Raymond Moore	(Australia) Steve Docherty (United States) Eliot Teltscher	6–4, 6–2
41.	1979	Tel Aviv, Israel	Hard	(Netherlands) Tom Okker	(United States) Mike Cahill (Australia) Colin Dibley	7–5, 6–4
42.	1981	Nancy, France	Carpet (i)	(Italy) Adriano Panatta	(United Kingdom) John Feaver (Czechoslovakia) Jiří Hřebec	6–4, 2–6, 6–4
43.	1981	Basel, Switzerland	Hard (i)	(Argentina) José Luis Clerc	(Switzerland) Markus Günthardt (Czechoslovakia) Pavel Složil	7–6, 6–7, 7–6
44.	1981	Paris, France	Hard (i)	(France) Yannick Noah	(United Kingdom) Andrew Jarrett (United Kingdom) Jonathan Smith	6–4, 6–4
45.	1985	Tel Aviv, Israel	Hard	(United States) Brad Gilbert	(South Africa) Michael Robertson (Romania) Florin Segărceanu	6–3, 6–2

== Singles performance timeline ==
Key
W	F	SF	QF	#R	RR	Q#	DNQ	A	NH

(W) winner; (F) finalist; (SF) semifinalist; (QF) quarterfinalist; (#R) rounds 4, 3, 2, 1; (RR) round-robin stage; (Q#) qualification round; (DNQ) did not qualify; (A) absent; (NH) not held; (SR) strike rate (events won / competed); (W–L) win–loss record.

Qualifying matches and walkovers are neither official match wins nor losses.

Tournament	1966	1967	1968	1969	1970	1971	1972	1973	1974	1975	1976	1977	1978	1979	1980	1981	1982	1983	1984	1985	SR	W–L	Win%
Grand Slam tournaments
Australian Open	A	A	A	A	A	A	A	A	A	A	A	A	A	A	A	1R	A	A	A	A	0 / 1	0–1	0.00
French Open	3R	3R	2R	1R	QF	F	1R	W	QF	3R	A	QF	A	1R	A	3R	2R	3R	1R	A	1 / 16	37–15	71.15
Wimbledon	1R	1R	A	3R	4R	2R	F	4R	4R	2R	F	QF	QF	A	3R	1R	1R	A	A	A	0 / 15	35–15	70.00
US Open	A	A	A	4R	A	3R	W	2R	3R	QF	SF	2R	A	2R	2R	1R	4R	1R	1R	1R	1 / 15	29–14	67.44
Win–loss	2–2	2–2	1–1	5–3	7–2	9–3	13–2	11–2	9–3	7–3	10–2	9–3	4–1	1–2	3–2	2–4	4–3	2–2	0–2	0–1	2 / 47	101–45	69.18
Year-end championships
Masters Cup	NH				A	W	W	W	F	W	A										4 / 5	22–3	88.00
National representation
Davis Cup	P	P	P	F	P	F	F	SF	QF	P	P	QF		P	QF		1R	2R	1R		0 / 17	74–22	77.08
Notable tournaments (Grand Prix / WCT)
Monte-Carlo	A	A	A	A	SF	W	W	W	F	A	A	A	QF	QF	1R	1R	1R	2R	1R	1R	3 / 13	27–10	72.97
Rome	A	A	4R	4R	W	A	SF	W	F	SF	A	QF	A	1R	A	1R	2R	A	1R	A	2 / 12	33–10	76.74
Hamburg	A	A	A	3R	F	A	QF	A	A	SF	A	A	A	3R	A	A	A	A	A	A	0 / 5	15–5	75.00
Canada	A	A	A	A	A	A	W	A	1R	F	A	A	A	A	A	A	A	A	A	A	1 / 3	11–2	84.62
Cincinnati	A	A	A	A	SF	A	A	W	A	A	A	A	A	QF	A	2R	A	A	A	A	1 / 4	13–3	81.25
Paris	NH			2R	A	NH	QF	W	A	SF	A	A	A	A	A	QF	A	NH			1 / 5	12–4	75.00
Wembley	A	A	A	1R	QF	W	NH				QF	A	2R	A	1R	1R	A	A	A	A	1 / 7	10–6	62.50
Career statistics
Tournaments	2	2	7	22	21	21	32	32	28	26	24	21	22	22	19	27	24	11	12	4	379		
Titles / Finals	0–0	0–0	0–2	2–3	2–4	8–13	12–16	16–19	7–12	6–10	6–13	3–5	2–5	0–1	0–0	0–2	0–0	0–0	0–0	0–0	64 / 104	64–40	61.54
Overall win–loss	2-2	2-2	23-6	40–26	60–21	85–12	120–20	125–18	80–21	93–21	78–15	49–19	44–21	32–26	25–24	25–27	16–26	8–13	4–14	1–4	912 / 1250	912–338	72.96
YE ranking	–	–	–	–	–	–	–	1	10	7	3	9	16	50	79	73	118	169	202	431	$2,076,761		

== Other titles (24) ==
Here are Năstase's tournament wins that are not included in the statistics on the Association of Tennis Professionals (ATP) website. The website is incomplete from 1968 to 1970 and has some omissions for tournaments held since 1968.

Năstase won several tournaments during the early years of his career that were equivalent to the present day "challenger" tournaments. Because the term "challenger" started to be applied to second-rank tournaments in 1978, those tournaments are termed "minor tournaments" in the following list.

- 1967 – Cannes (minor tournament), Travemünde (minor tournament)
- 1968 – Viareggio, Bucharest (minor tournament)
- 1969 – Madras (minor tournament), New Delhi (minor tournament), Gauhati (minor tournament), Travemünde, La Corogne, Budapest, Denver
- 1970 – Napoli, Ancona
- 1971 – Istanbul
- 1973 – Istanbul
- 1974 – Portland
- 1975 – Helsinki, Dutch Round Robin (Utrecht Netherlands), Graz, Uppsala
- 1976 – Caracas (a four-man invitation tournament in October, not to be confused with the Caracas WCT in March that was won by Raúl Ramírez), Argentine Round Robin (invitational tournament)
- 1977 – Rotterdam World Star (invitational tournament)
- 1978 – Frankfurt (invitational tournament)

== Records ==
- These records were attained in the Open Era of tennis.

Championship	Years	Record accomplished	Player tied
Masters Grand Prix	1971–75	88.00% (22–3) match winning percentage	Stands alone
Grand Prix Tour	1968–85	42 five set match wins	Stands alone
