= 1973 Monte Carlo Open – Singles =

Singles
- 1973 Monte Carlo Open

Final
- Champion: (Romania) Ilie Năstase
- Runner-up: (Sweden) Björn Borg
- Score: 6–4, 6–1, 6–2

Details
- Draw: 48
- Seeds: 7

Events
Singles	Doubles
← 1972 ·	Monte-Carlo Masters	· 1974 →

The 1973 Monte Carlo Open – Singles was an event of the 1973 Monte Carlo Open tennis tournament and was played at the Monte Carlo Country Club in Roquebrune-Cap-Martin, France between 16 April through 21 April 1973. Ilie Năstase was the defending champion and was top-seeded player. He retained his singles title, defeating Björn Borg in the final, 6–4, 6–1, 6–2.

== Seeds ==
1. (Romania) Ilie Năstase (champion)
2. (Spain) Manuel Orantes (second round)
3. (Italy) Adriano Panatta (quarterfinals)
4. (France) Patrick Proisy (semifinals)
5. (Spain) Andrés Gimeno (second round)
6. (Romania) Ion Țiriac (third round)
7. (Czechoslovakia) Jiří Hřebec (second round)

Click on the seed number of a player to go to their draw section.

== Draw ==
=== Key ===
- Q = Qualifier
- WC = Wild card
- LL = Lucky loser
- Alt = Alternate
- SE = Special exempt
- PR = Protected ranking
- ITF = ITF entry
- JE = Junior exempt
- w/o = Walkover
- r = Retired
- d = Defaulted
- SR = Special ranking

=== Finals ===
Quarterfinals
(Sweden) Björn Borg	6	6	6
(Spain) Antonio Muñoz	2	2	3
3	(Italy) Adriano Panatta	7	5	6
(France) Georges Goven	6	7	2
(Italy) Martin Mulligan	5	6	3
4	(France) Patrick Proisy	7	0	6
LL	(West Germany) Harald Elschenbroich	2	5	2
1	(Romania) Ilie Năstase	6	7	6

Semifinals
(Sweden) Björn Borg	7	6	5
(France) Georges Goven	5	4	7
4	(France) Patrick Proisy	0	4	2
1	(Romania) Ilie Năstase	6	6	6

Final
(Sweden) Björn Borg	4	1	2
1	(Romania) Ilie Năstase	6	6	6

=== Top half ===
==== Section 1 ====
First Round
(Italy) Corrado Barazzutti	6	2	9
(Australia) Kim Warwick	2	6	7
(Hungary) Róbert Machán	4	7	6
Q	(France) Jean-Loup Rouyer	6	5	4
(Italy) Paolo Bertolucci	7	6
(France) Patrice Dominguez	5	1
Q	(Hungary) Balázs Taróczy	6	6
(United States) Steve Faulk	4	3

Second Round
2	(Spain) Manuel Orantes	7	4	1
(Italy) Corrado Barazzutti	5	6	6
(Sweden) Björn Borg	6	6
(Hungary) Róbert Machán	4	1
7	(Czechoslovakia) Jiří Hřebec	4	1
(Italy) Paolo Bertolucci	6	6
(Spain) Antonio Muñoz	6	7
Q	(Hungary) Balázs Taróczy	4	6

Third Round
(Italy) Corrado Barazzutti	2	3
(Sweden) Björn Borg	6	6
(Italy) Paolo Bertolucci	4	6
(Spain) Antonio Muñoz	6	7

Quarterfinals
(Sweden) Björn Borg	6	6	6
(Spain) Antonio Muñoz	2	2	3

==== Section 2 ====
First Round
(Sweden) Kjell Johansson	2	7	9
(United States) Mike Estep	6	5	7
(Belgium) Bernard Mignot	7	7
Q	(Jamaica) Richard Russell	6	5
(West Germany) Attila Korpás	0	6	7
(United Kingdom) David Lloyd	6	4	5
Q	(France) Éric Deblicker	7	6
(Italy) Massimo Di Domenico	6	4

Second Round
3	(Italy) Adriano Panatta	6	7
(Sweden) Kjell Johansson	3	6
(West Germany) Karl Meiler	0	4
(Belgium) Bernard Mignot	6	6
6	(Romania) Ion Țiriac	6	7
(West Germany) Attila Korpás	1	6
(France) Georges Goven	7	6
Q	(France) Éric Deblicker	5	1

Third Round
3	(Italy) Adriano Panatta	6	6
(Belgium) Bernard Mignot	4	2
6	(Romania) Ion Țiriac	4	6	2
(France) Georges Goven	6	3	6

Quarterfinals
3	(Italy) Adriano Panatta	7	5	6
(France) Georges Goven	6	7	2

=== Bottom half ===
==== Section 3 ====
First Round
Q	(Australia) Alan McDonald	3	6	11
(United States) Paul Gerken	6	1	9
(Italy) Martin Mulligan	2	6	6
(United Kingdom) John Lloyd	6	4	1
(Italy) Tonino Zugarelli	6	6
Q	(Chile) Patricio Rodríguez	3	2
(Austria) Hans Kary	1	6	6
(Italy) Vincenzo Franchitti	6	1	2

Second Round
Q	(Australia) Alan McDonald	2	2
(Belgium) Patrick Hombergen	6	6
(Italy) Martin Mulligan	6	5	6
5	(Spain) Andrés Gimeno	3	7	4
(Italy) Tonino Zugarelli	3	7	5
(Spain) Juan Gisbert Sr.	6	6	7
(Austria) Hans Kary	3	1
4	(France) Patrick Proisy	6	6

Third Round
(Belgium) Patrick Hombergen	1	0
(Italy) Martin Mulligan	6	6
(Spain) Juan Gisbert Sr.	4	4
4	(France) Patrick Proisy	6	6

Quarterfinals
(Italy) Martin Mulligan	5	6	3
4	(France) Patrick Proisy	7	0	6

==== Section 4 ====
First Round
(Hungary) István Gulyás	6	2	6
(Australia) John Bartlett	4	6	1
(United Kingdom) John Feaver	6	3	6
(Australia) Ian Fletcher	1	6	1
Q	(Socialist Federal Republic of Yugoslavia) Nikola Špear	6	2	6
(France) Bernard Montrenaud	1	6	1
(Mexico) Marcelo Lara	7	6
(Hungary) Szabolcs Baranyi	5	3

Second Round
(Hungary) István Gulyás	7	6
(France) Wanaro N'Godrella	6	0
(United Kingdom) John Feaver	2	6	4
LL	(West Germany) Harald Elschenbroich	6	2	6
Q	(Socialist Federal Republic of Yugoslavia) Nikola Špear	3	4
(Hungary) Péter Szőke	6	6
(Mexico) Marcelo Lara	4	3
1	(Romania) Ilie Năstase	6	6

Third Round
(Hungary) István Gulyás	4	3
LL	(West Germany) Harald Elschenbroich	6	6
(Hungary) Péter Szőke	2	2
1	(Romania) Ilie Năstase	6	6

Quarterfinals
LL	(West Germany) Harald Elschenbroich	2	5	2
1	(Romania) Ilie Năstase	6	7	6
