= 1973 Monte Carlo Open =

Men's tennis tournament

- Date: 16 – 21 April
- Edition: 67th
- Category: Rothmans Spring Circuit
- Draw: 64S / 32D
- Prize money: $20,000
- Surface: Clay / outdoor
- Location: Roquebrune-Cap-Martin, France
- Venue: Monte Carlo Country Club

Champions

Singles
- (Romania) Ilie Năstase

Doubles
- (Spain) Juan Gisbert / (Romania) Ilie Năstase
← 1972 ·	Monte Carlo Open	· 1974 →

The 1973 Monte Carlo Open, also known by its sponsored name Craven Monte Carlo Championships, was a men's tennis tournament played on outdoor clay courts at the Monte Carlo Country Club in Roquebrune-Cap-Martin, France. The tournament was part of the Rothmans Spring Mediterranean Circuit, a series of six tournaments held in France, Monaco, Spain and Italy from March to May 1973. It was the 67th edition of the event and was held from 16 April through 21 April 1973. First-seeded Ilie Năstase won his third successive singles title at the event.

== Finals ==
=== Singles ===
(Romania) Ilie Năstase defeated (Sweden) Björn Borg 6–4, 6–1, 6–2

=== Doubles ===
(Spain) Juan Gisbert / (Romania) Ilie Năstase defeated (France) Georges Goven / (France) Patrick Proisy 6–2, 6–2, 6–2
