= 1969 Monte Carlo Open =

- Date: 15–21 April 1969
- Edition: 63rd
- Draw: 64S / 32D
- Surface: Clay / outdoor
- Location: Roquebrune-Cap-Martin, France
- Venue: Monte Carlo Country Club

Champions

Men's singles
- (Netherlands) Tom Okker

Women's singles
- (United Kingdom) Ann Jones

Men's doubles
- (Australia) Owen Davidson / (Australia) John Newcombe

Women's doubles
- (United Kingdom) Ann Jones / (United Kingdom) Virginia Wade

Mixed doubles
- (France) Françoise Dürr / (France) Jean-Claude Barclay
| ← 1968 · | Monte Carlo Open | · 1970 → |

The 1969 Monte Carlo Open was a combined men's and women's tennis tournament played on outdoor clay courts at the Monte Carlo Country Club in Roquebrune-Cap-Martin, France. It was the 63rd edition of the event and was held from 15 April through 21 April 1969. Tom Okker and Ann Jones won the singles titles.

== Finals ==
=== Men's singles ===
(Netherlands) Tom Okker defeated (Australia) John Newcombe 8–10, 6–1, 7–5, 6–3

=== Women's singles ===
(United Kingdom) Ann Jones defeated (United Kingdom) Virginia Wade 6–1, 6–3

=== Men's doubles ===
(Australia) Owen Davidson / (Australia) John Newcombe defeated (United States) Pancho Gonzales / (United States) Dennis Ralston 7–5, 11–13, 6–2, 6–1

=== Women's doubles ===
(United Kingdom) Ann Jones / (United Kingdom) Virginia Wade defeated (France) Gail Chanfreau / (France) Françoise Dürr 1–6, 6–4, 6–3

=== Mixed doubles ===
(France) Françoise Dürr / (France) Jean-Claude Barclay defeated (United Kingdom) Ann Jones / (Australia) Fred Stolle 6–4, 6–4
