= 1976 Monte Carlo Open =

1976 Monte Carlo WCT
- Date: 13–20 April
- Edition: 71st
- Category: World Championship Tennis (WCT)
- Draw: 16S / 8D
- Prize money: $60,000
- Surface: Clay / outdoor
- Location: Roquebrune-Cap-Martin, France
- Venue: Monte Carlo Country Club

Champions

Men's singles
- (Argentina) Guillermo Vilas

Women's singles
- (West Germany) Helga Masthoff

Men's doubles
- (West Germany) Karl Meiler / (Poland) Wojciech Fibak

Women's doubles
- (West Germany) Katja Ebbinghaus / (West Germany) Helga Masthoff
- Monte Carlo WCT

The 1976 Monte Carlo WCT was a combined men's and women's tennis tournament played on outdoor clay courts at the Monte Carlo Country Club in Roquebrune-Cap-Martin, France. The men's tournament was part of the World Championship Tennis (WCT) tour. It was the 71st edition of the event and was held from 13 April through 20 April 1976. Guillermo Vilas and Helga Masthoff won the singles titles.

== Finals ==
=== Men's singles ===
(Argentina) Guillermo Vilas defeated (Poland) Wojciech Fibak 6–1, 6-1, 6–4

=== Women's singles ===
(West Germany) Helga Masthoff defeated (Uruguay) Fiorella Bonicelli 6–4, 6-2

=== Men's doubles ===
(West Germany) Karl Meiler / (Poland) Wojciech Fibak defeated (Sweden) Björn Borg / (Argentina) Guillermo Vilas 7–6, 6–1

=== Women's doubles ===
(West Germany) Katja Ebbinghaus / (West Germany) Helga Masthoff defeated (France) Rosie Reyes Darmon / (France) Gail Lovera 6–3, 7–5
