= 1975 Monte Carlo WCT =

- Date: 23–30 March
- Edition: 70th
- Category: World Championship Tennis (WCT)
- Draw: 32S / 16D
- Prize money: $60,000
- Surface: Clay / outdoor
- Location: Roquebrune-Cap-Martin, France
- Venue: Monte Carlo Country Club

Champions

Singles
- (Spain) Manuel Orantes

Doubles
- (South Africa) Bob Hewitt / (South Africa) Frew McMillan
- Monte Carlo WCT

The 1975 Monte Carlo WCT, also known by its sponsored name Marlboro Classic, was a men's tennis tournament played on outdoor clay courts at the Monte Carlo Country Club in Roquebrune-Cap-Martin, France. The tournament was part of the Green Group of the 1975 World Championship Tennis circuit. It was the 70th edition of the event and was held from 23 March through 30 March 1975. Manuel Orantes won the singles title.

== Finals ==
=== Singles ===
(Spain) Manuel Orantes defeated (South Africa) Bob Hewitt 6–2, 6–4

=== Doubles ===
(South Africa) Bob Hewitt / (South Africa) Frew McMillan defeated (United States) Arthur Ashe / (Netherlands) Tom Okker 6–3, 6–2
