= 1978 Monte Carlo WCT =

1978 Monte Carlo Open
- Date: 10–16 April
- Edition: 72nd
- Category: Grand Prix circuit (WCT)
- Draw: 32S / 16D
- Prize money: $175,000
- Surface: Clay / outdoor
- Location: Roquebrune-Cap-Martin, France
- Venue: Monte Carlo Country Club

Champions

Singles
- (Mexico) Raúl Ramírez

Doubles
- (United States) Peter Fleming / (Czechoslovakia) Tomáš Šmíd
← 1977 ·	Monte Carlo Open	· 1979 →

The 1978 Monte Carlo Open was a men's tennis tournament played on outdoor clay courts at the Monte Carlo Country Club in Roquebrune-Cap-Martin, France. The tournament was part of the WCT Tour, which was incorporated into the 1978 Colgate-Palmolive Grand Prix circuit. It was the 72nd edition of the event and was held from 10 April through 16 April 1978. Raúl Ramírez, the no. 5 seed, won the singles title.

== Finals ==
=== Singles ===
(Mexico) Raúl Ramírez defeated (Czechoslovakia) Tomáš Šmíd 6–3, 6–3, 6–4

- It was Ramírez' 2nd singles title of the year and the 15th of his career.

=== Doubles ===
(United States) Peter Fleming / (Czechoslovakia) Tomáš Šmíd defeated (Chile) Jaime Fillol / (Romania) Ilie Năstase 6–4, 7–5
