= 1979 Monte Carlo Open =

- Date: 9–15 April
- Edition: 73rd
- Category: Grand Prix circuit (WCT)
- Draw: 32S / 16D
- Prize money: $175,000
- Surface: Clay / outdoor
- Location: Roquebrune-Cap-Martin, France
- Venue: Monte Carlo Country Club

Champions

Singles
- (Sweden) Björn Borg

Doubles
- (Romania) Ilie Năstase / (Mexico) Raúl Ramírez
← 1978 ·	Monte Carlo Open	· 1980 →

The 1979 Monte Carlo Open was a men's tennis tournament played on outdoor clay courts at the Monte Carlo Country Club in Roquebrune-Cap-Martin, France that was part of the 1979 Colgate-Palmolive Grand Prix circuit. It was the 73rd edition of the tournament and was held from 9 April through 15 April 1979. First-seeded Björn Borg won the singles title, his second at the event after 1977.

== Finals ==
=== Singles ===
(Sweden) Björn Borg defeated (United States) Vitas Gerulaitis 6–2, 6–1, 6–3

- It was Borg's 4th singles title of the year and the 43rd of his career.

=== Doubles ===
(Romania) Ilie Năstase / (Mexico) Raúl Ramírez defeated (Paraguay) Víctor Pecci / (Hungary) Balázs Taróczy 6–3, 6–4
