= 1984 Monte Carlo Open =

- Date: 16–20 April
- Edition: 78th
- Category: Grand Prix
- Draw: 32S / 16D
- Prize money: $325,000
- Surface: Clay / outdoor
- Location: Roquebrune-Cap-Martin, France
- Venue: Monte Carlo Country Club

Champions

Singles
- (Sweden) Henrik Sundström

Doubles
- (Australia) Mark Edmondson / (United States) Sherwood Stewart
← 1983 ·	Monte Carlo Open	· 1985 →

The 1984 Monte Carlo Open, also known by its sponsored name Jacomo Monte Carlo Open, was a men's tennis tournament played on outdoor clay courts at the Monte Carlo Country Club in Roquebrune-Cap-Martin, France that was part of the 1984 Volvo Grand Prix. It was the 78th edition of the tournament and was held from 16 April until 20 April 1984. Unseeded Henrik Sundström won the singles title, after defeating four top 10 players, and earned $65,000 first-prize money.

== Finals ==
=== Singles ===
(Sweden) Henrik Sundström' defeated (Sweden) Mats Wilander, 6–3, 7–5, 6–2

- It was Sundström's 2nd singles title of the year and the 3rd of his career.

=== Doubles ===
(Australia) Mark Edmondson / (United States) Sherwood Stewart defeated (Sweden) Jan Gunnarsson / (Sweden) Mats Wilander, 6–2, 6–1
