= 1985 Monte Carlo Open =

- Date: 1–7 April
- Edition: 79th
- Category: Grand Prix
- Draw: 48S / 24D
- Prize money: $325,000
- Surface: Clay / outdoor
- Location: Roquebrune-Cap-Martin, France
- Venue: Monte Carlo Country Club

Champions

Singles
- (Czechoslovakia) Ivan Lendl

Doubles
- (Czechoslovakia) Pavel Složil / (Czechoslovakia) Tomáš Šmíd
← 1984 ·	Monte Carlo Open	· 1986 →

The 1985 Monte Carlo Open, also known by its sponsored name Jacomo Monte Carlo Open, was a men's tennis tournament played on outdoor clay courts at the Monte Carlo Country Club in Roquebrune-Cap-Martin, France that was part of the 1985 Nabisco Grand Prix. It was the 79th edition of the tournament and was held from 1 April until 7 April 1985. First-seeded Ivan Lendl won the singles title and earned $58,000 first-prize money. On the final Sunday he had to finish his semifinal again defending champion Henrik Sundström before defeating Mats Wilander in a 3 1/2-hour final.

== Finals ==
=== Singles ===
(Czechoslovakia) Ivan Lendl defeated (Sweden) Mats Wilander, 6–1, 6–3, 4–6, 6–4

- It was Lendl's 2nd singles title of the year and the 44th of his career.

=== Doubles ===
(Czechoslovakia) Pavel Složil / (Czechoslovakia) Tomáš Šmíd defeated (Israel) Shlomo Glickstein / (Israel) Shahar Perkiss, 6–2, 6–3
