= 1986 Monte Carlo Open =

- Date: 21–27 April
- Edition: 80th
- Category: Grand Prix
- Draw: 48S / 24D
- Prize money: $325,000
- Surface: Clay / outdoor
- Location: Roquebrune-Cap-Martin, France
- Venue: Monte Carlo Country Club

Champions

Singles
- (Sweden) Joakim Nyström

Doubles
- (France) Guy Forget / (France) Yannick Noah
- Monte Carlo Open

The 1986 Monte Carlo Open, also known by its sponsored name Volvo Monte Carlo Open, was a men's tennis tournament played on outdoor clay courts at the Monte Carlo Country Club in Roquebrune-Cap-Martin, France that was part of the 1986 Nabisco Grand Prix. It was the 80th edition of the tournament and was held from 21 April until 27 April 1986. Third-seeded Joakim Nyström won the singles title.

== Finals ==
=== Singles ===
(Sweden) Joakim Nyström defeated (France) Yannick Noah, 6–3, 6–2

- It was Nyström 4th singles title of the year and the 11th of his career.

=== Doubles ===
(France) Guy Forget / (France) Yannick Noah defeated (Sweden) Joakim Nyström / (Sweden) Mats Wilander, 6–4, 3–6, 6–4
