= 1973 Dunhill Florence =

Tennis tournament

- Date: 30 April – 6 May
- Edition: 1st
- Category: Grand Prix
- Draw: 46S / 16D
- Prize money: $20,000
- Surface: Clay / outdoor
- Location: Florence, Italy

Champions

Singles
- (Romania) Ilie Năstase

Doubles
- (Italy) Paolo Bertolucci / (Italy) Adriano Panatta
- ATP Florence

The 1973 Dunhill Florence was a men's tennis tournament played on outdoor clay courts in Florence, Italy that was part of the 1973 Rothmans Spring Mediterranean Circuit. It was the inaugural edition of the tournament and was played from 30 April until 6 May 1973. Ilie Năstase won the singles title and earned $4,000 first-prize money.

== Finals ==
=== Singles ===
(Romania) Ilie Năstase defeated (Italy) Adriano Panatta 6–3, 3–6, 0–6, 7–6, 6–4

- It was Năstase's 7th singles title of the year and the 31st of his career.

=== Doubles ===
(Italy) Paolo Bertolucci / (Italy) Adriano Panatta defeated (Spain) Juan Gisbert / (Romania) Ilie Năstase 6–3, 6–4
