= Olive tree (disambiguation) =

The olive tree is a small tree in the family Oleaceae.

Olive tree may also refer to:

== Arts, entertainment, and media ==
=== Films ===
- The Olive Tree (1975 film), an Australian TV movie
- The Olive Tree (2016 film), a 2016 film directed by Icíar Bollaín

=== Songs ===
- "Olive Tree" (song), a 2023 song by Peter Gabriel
- "The Olive Tree", a 1953 American song from the 1953 musical Kismet
- "The Olive Tree", a 1967 song written by Diane Lampert and Tom Springfield and performed by Dusty Springfield on her BBC show in 1966, and Judith Durham in 1967
- "The Olive Tree", a 1979 Taiwanese song (橄欖樹) by Chyi Yu
- "The Olive Tree", a song by Scale the Summit from the album The Migration

== Politics ==
- Olive Tree (Greece), a centre-left electoral alliance in Greece
- The Olive Tree (Italy) (Italian: L'Ulivo), a former centre-left political coalition in Italy

== Religion ==
- Olive Tree Bible Software, an electronic publisher of Bible versions, study tools, and Christian eBooks for mobile devices
- Olive Tree Theology, a Christian theological movement
- Olive Tree (religious movement), a Korean new religious movement

== Other ==
- Olive tree of Vouves, a 20 to 40 centuries old tree in a village Ano Vouves, Crete, Greece
- Olive Trees, a series of paintings by Vincent van Gogh
- The millennial olive tree of Roquebrune Cap-Martin, reportedly the oldest tree in France
