= 1980 Monte Carlo Open =

- Date: 31 March – 6 April
- Edition: 74th
- Category: Grand Prix circuit
- Draw: 32S / 16D
- Prize money: $175,000
- Surface: Clay / outdoor
- Location: Roquebrune-Cap-Martin, France
- Venue: Monte Carlo Country Club

Champions

Singles
- (Sweden) Björn Borg

Doubles
- (Italy) Paolo Bertolucci / (Italy) Adriano Panatta
← 1979 ·	Monte Carlo Open	· 1981 →

The 1980 Monte Carlo Open was a men's tennis tournament played on outdoor clay courts at the Monte Carlo Country Club in Roquebrune-Cap-Martin, France that was part of the 1980 Volvo Grand Prix circuit. It was the 74th edition of the tournament and was held from 31 March through 6 April 1980. First-seeded Björn Borg won the singles title, his third after 1977 and 1979.

== Finals ==
=== Singles ===
(Sweden) Björn Borg defeated (Argentina) Guillermo Vilas 6–1, 6–0, 6–2

- It was Borg's 4th singles title of the year and the 56th of his career.

=== Doubles ===
(Italy) Paolo Bertolucci / (Italy) Adriano Panatta defeated (United States) Vitas Gerulaitis / (United States) John McEnroe 6–2, 5–7, 6–3
