= 1981 Monte Carlo Open =

- Date: 13–20 April
- Edition: 75th
- Category: Grand Prix circuit
- Draw: 32S / 16D
- Prize money: $250,000
- Surface: Clay / outdoor
- Location: Roquebrune-Cap-Martin, France
- Venue: Monte Carlo Country Club

Champions

Singles
- Match not completed, abandoned due to rain

Doubles
- (Switzerland) Heinz Günthardt / (Hungary) Balázs Taróczy
← 1980 ·	Monte Carlo Open	· 1982 →

The 1981 Monte Carlo Open was a men's tennis tournament played on outdoor clay courts at the Monte Carlo Country Club in Roquebrune-Cap-Martin, France that was part of the 1981 Volvo Grand Prix circuit. It was the 75th edition of the tournament and was held from 13 April until 20 April 1981. Jimmy Connors and Guillermo Vilas were considered runners-up since the final, which was already postponed to Monday due to rain, was abandoned due to further rain at 5–5 in the first set.

== Finals ==
=== Singles ===
No winner as the final was abandoned. Jimmy Connors and Guillermo Vilas both received runners-up finishes. (United States) Jimmy Connors and (Argentina) Guillermo Vilas 5–5.

=== Doubles ===
(Switzerland) Heinz Günthardt / (Hungary) Balázs Taróczy defeated (Czechoslovakia) Pavel Složil / (Czechoslovakia) Tomáš Šmíd 6–3, 6–3
