= 1983 Monte Carlo Open =

- Date: 28 March – 3 April
- Edition: 77th
- Draw: 32S / 16D
- Prize money: $300,000
- Surface: Clay / outdoor
- Location: Roquebrune-Cap-Martin, France
- Venue: Monte Carlo Country Club

Champions

Singles
- (Sweden) Mats Wilander

Doubles
- (Switzerland) Heinz Günthardt / (Hungary) Balázs Taróczy
- Monte Carlo Open

The 1983 Monte Carlo Open (also known as the Jacomo Monte Carlo Open for sponsorship reasons) was a men's tennis tournament played on outdoor clay courts at the Monte Carlo Country Club in Roquebrune-Cap-Martin, France that was part of the 1983 Volvo Grand Prix. The tournament was held from 28 March through 3 April 1983. Fifth-seeded Mats Wilander won the singles title.

== Finals ==
=== Singles ===
(Sweden) Mats Wilander defeated (United States) Mel Purcell, 6–1, 6–2, 6–3

- It was Wilander's 1st singles title of the year and the 5th of his career.

=== Doubles ===
(Switzerland) Heinz Günthardt / (Hungary) Balázs Taróczy defeated (France) Henri Leconte / (France) Yannick Noah, 6–2, 6–4
