= 1970 Monte Carlo Open =

- Date: 13–19 April
- Edition: 64th
- Category: Independent tour
- Draw: 32S / 16D
- Surface: Clay / outdoor
- Location: Roquebrune-Cap-Martin, France
- Venue: Monte Carlo Country Club

Champions

Men's singles
- (Socialist Federal Republic of Yugoslavia) Željko Franulović

Women's singles
- (West Germany) Helga Niessen

Men's doubles
- (United States) Marty Riessen / (United Kingdom) Roger Taylor

Women's doubles
- (France) Gail Chanfreau / (France) Françoise Dürr
- Monte Carlo Open

The 1970 Monte Carlo Open was a combined men's and women's tennis tournament played on outdoor clay courts at the Monte Carlo Country Club in Roquebrune-Cap-Martin, France. The tournament was independent, i.e. not part of the 1970 Pepsi-Cola Grand Prix or 1970 World Championship Tennis circuit. It was the 64th edition of the event and was held from 13 April through 19 April 1970. Željko Franulović and Helga Niessen won the singles titles.

== Finals ==
=== Men's singles ===
(Socialist Federal Republic of Yugoslavia) Željko Franulović defeated (Spain) Manuel Orantes 6–4, 6–3, 6–3

=== Women's singles ===
(West Germany) Helga Niessen defeated (Australia) Kerry Melville 6–4, 6–1

=== Men's doubles ===
(United States) Marty Riessen / (United Kingdom) Roger Taylor defeated (France) Pierre Barthès / (Socialist Federal Republic of Yugoslavia) Nikola Pilić 6–3, 6–4, 6–2

=== Women's doubles ===
(France) Gail Chanfreau / (France) Françoise Dürr defeated (United Kingdom) Winnie Shaw / (United Kingdom) Virginia Wade 6–2, 6–3
