= 1977 Monte Carlo WCT =

1977 Monte Carlo Open
- Date: 4–10 April
- Edition: 72nd
- Category: World Championship Tennis (WCT)
- Draw: 16S / 8D
- Prize money: $100,000
- Surface: Clay / outdoor
- Location: Roquebrune-Cap-Martin, France
- Venue: Monte Carlo Country Club

Champions

Singles
- (Sweden) Björn Borg

Doubles
- (France) François Jauffret / (Czechoslovakia) Jan Kodeš
- Monte Carlo Open

The 1977 Monte Carlo Open was a men's tennis tournament played on outdoor clay courts at the Monte Carlo Country Club in Roquebrune-Cap-Martin, France. The tournament was part of the World Championship Tennis (WCT) tour. It was the 71st edition of the event and was held from 4 April through 10 April 1977. Björn Borg won the singles title and the accompanying $30,000 first-prize money.

== Finals ==
=== Singles ===
(Sweden) Björn Borg defeated (Italy) Corrado Barazzutti 6–3, 7–5, 6–0

- It was Borg's 3rd singles title of the year and the 22nd of his career.

=== Doubles ===
(France) François Jauffret / (Czechoslovakia) Jan Kodeš defeated (Poland) Wojciech Fibak / (Netherlands) Tom Okker 2–6, 6–3, 6–2
