= 1972 Monte Carlo Open =

- Date: 27 March – 3 April
- Edition: 66th
- Category: Grand Prix circuit (WCT)
- Draw: 32S / 16D
- Prize money: $20,000
- Surface: Clay / outdoor
- Location: Roquebrune-Cap-Martin, France
- Venue: Monte Carlo Country Club

Champions

Singles
- (Romania) Ilie Năstase

Doubles
- (France) Patrice Beust / (France) Daniel Contet
- Monte Carlo Open

The 1972 Monte Carlo Open was a men's tennis tournament played on outdoor clay courts at the Monte Carlo Country Club in Roquebrune-Cap-Martin, France. The tournament was part of the WCT Tour, which was incorporated into the 1972 Commercial Union Assurance Grand Prix circuit. It was the 66th edition of the event and was held from 27 March through 3 April 1972. Ilie Năstase won the singles title.

== Finals ==
=== Singles ===
(Romania) Ilie Năstase defeated (Czechoslovakia) František Pála 6–1, 6–0, 6–3

- It was Năstase's 3rd singles title of the year and the 12th of his career.

=== Doubles ===
(France) Patrice Beust / (France) Daniel Contet defeated (Czechoslovakia) Jiří Hřebec / (Czechoslovakia) František Pála 3–6, 6–1, 12–10, 6–2
