= 1974 Monte Carlo WCT =

- Date: 8–14 April
- Edition: 69th
- Category: World Championship Tennis (WCT)
- Draw: 32S / 16D
- Prize money: $50,000
- Surface: Clay / outdoor
- Location: Roquebrune-Cap-Martin, France
- Venue: Monte Carlo Country Club

Champions

Singles
- (Rhodesia) Andrew Pattison

Doubles
- (Australia) John Alexander / (Australia) Phil Dent
- Monte Carlo WCT

The 1974 Monte Carlo Open was a men's tennis tournament played on outdoor clay courts at the Monte Carlo Country Club in Roquebrune-Cap-Martin, France. The tournament was part of the Red Group of the 1974 World Championship Tennis circuit. It was the 69th edition of the event and was held from 8 April through 14 April 1974. Unseeded Andrew Pattison won the singles title.

== Finals ==
=== Singles ===
(Rhodesia) Andrew Pattison defeated (Romania) Ilie Năstase 5–7, 6–3, 6–4

- It was Pattison's first singles title of his career.

=== Doubles ===
(Australia) John Alexander / (Australia) Phil Dent defeated (Spain) Manuel Orantes / (Australia) Tony Roche 7–6, 4–6, 7–6, 6–3
