= Millennial olive tree of Roquebrune Cap-Martin =

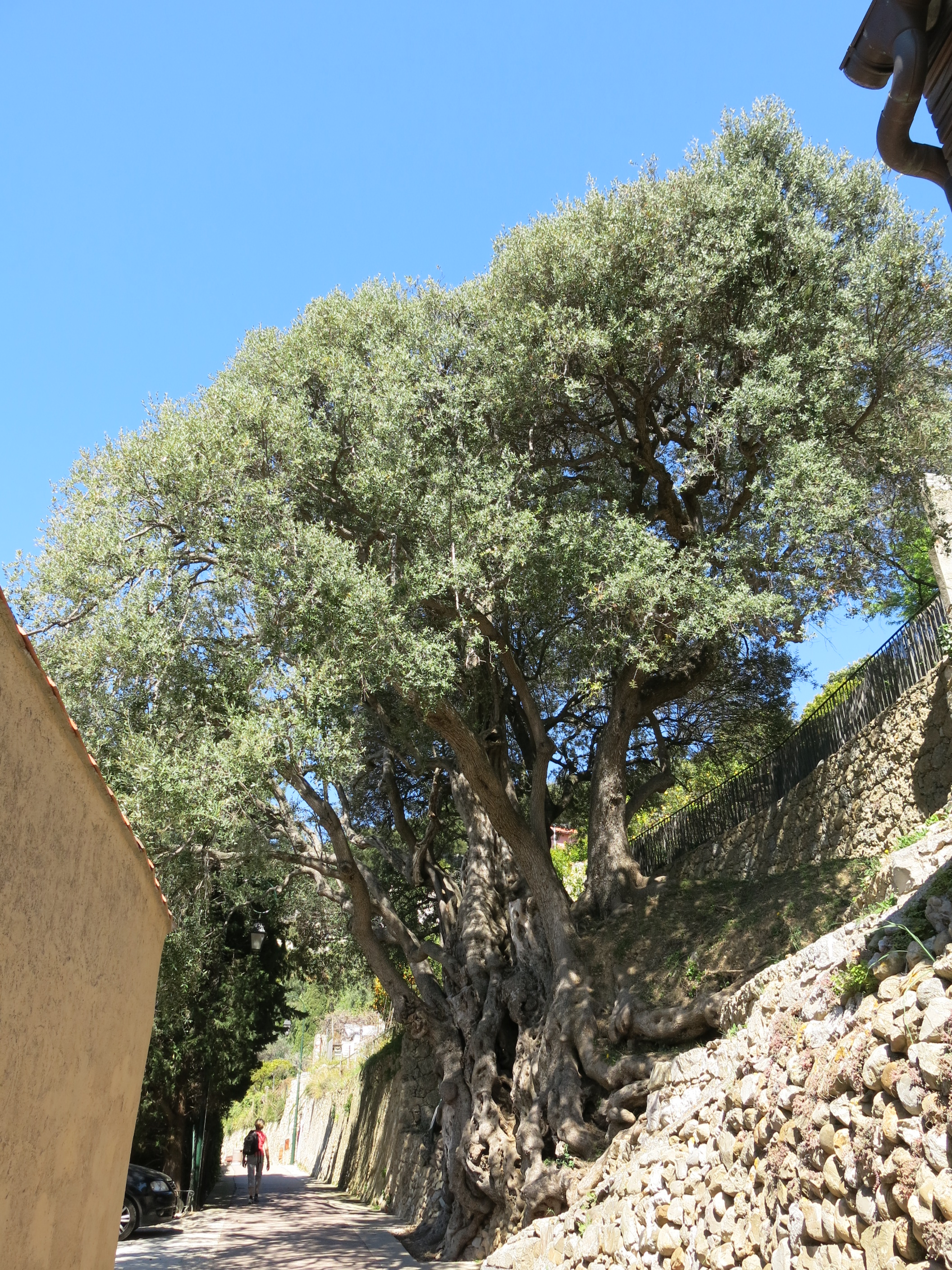
- Interactive map of Millennial olive tree of Roquebrune Cap-Martin
- Species: Olea europaea
- Location: Roquebrune-Cap-Martin
- Coordinates: 43°45′51.64″N 7°27′47.99″E
- Height: 15 m (49 ft)
- Girth: 23.5 m (77 ft)
- Date seeded: 0 CE

The millennial olive tree of Roquebrune Cap-Martin is a remarkable French tree in Roquebrune-Cap-Martin (Alpes-Maritimes, France). It is reportedly the oldest tree of France.

== Description ==
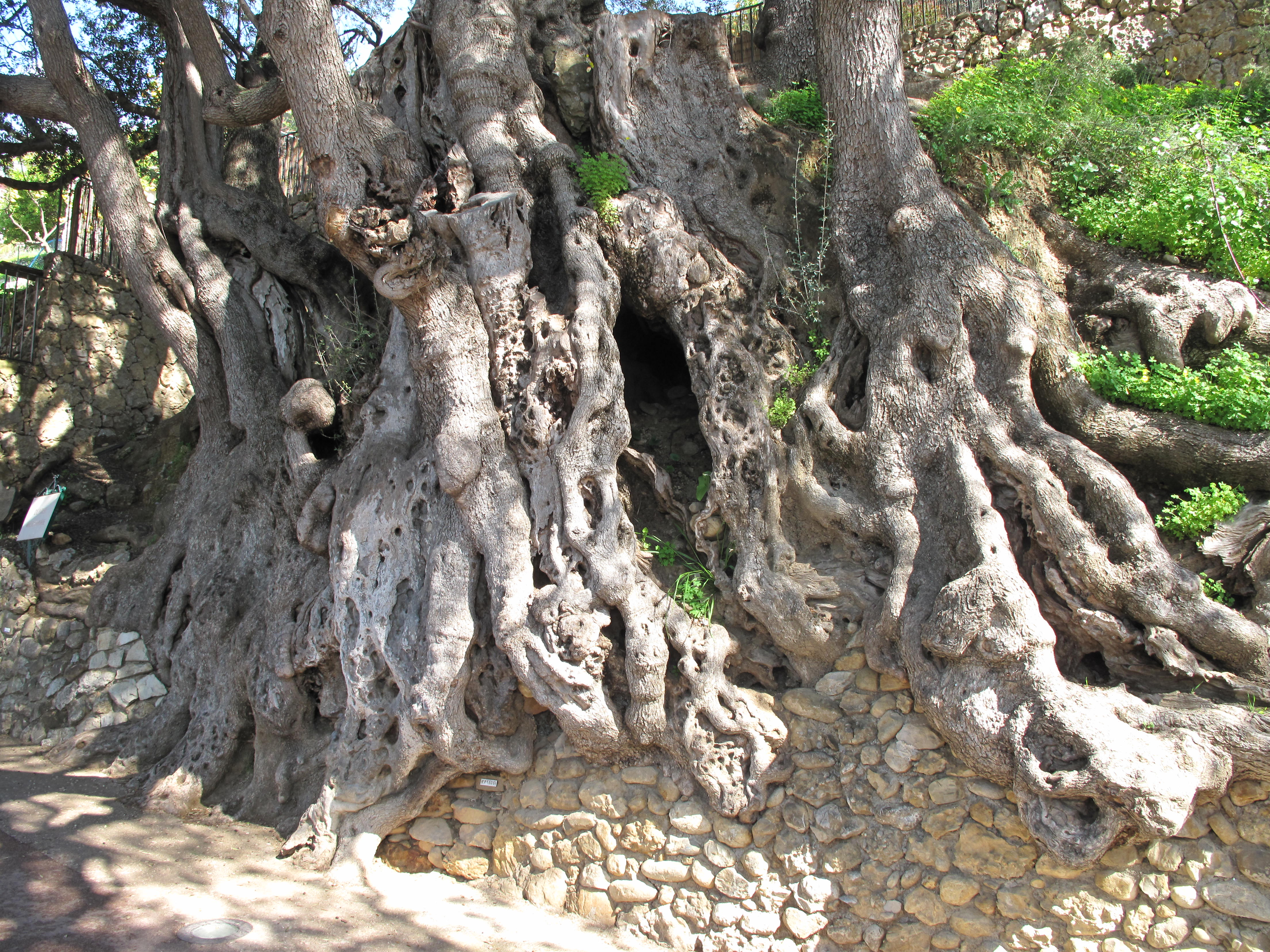
The roots of the olive tree.

The tree appears as a group of large shoots whose roots gradually absorb the stones on the wall on which it grows.It reaches a circumference of 23.5 m (77 ft) and a height of 15 m (49 ft).

It is not possible to assess the age of the tree by its tree rings because they are illegible. Moreover, the tree is hollow. According the shape of the tree and the age of other old trees of the region, it would be 2,500 to 2,800 years old. It is not at most 4,000 years old because at that time the olive tree's range had not yet reached the western Mediterranean.

It is reportedly the oldest tree in France.

It received the label remarkable tree of France on October of 2016. It produces small black olives of the variety pichoulina.
