= 1977 Italian Open – Men's singles =

Men's singles
- 1977 Italian Open

Final
- Champion: (United States) Vitas Gerulaitis
- Runner-up: (Italy) Antonio Zugarelli
- Score: 6–2, 7–6, 3–6, 7–6

Events
Singles	men	women
Doubles	men	women
← 1976 ·	Italian Open	· 1978 →

The Men's singles tournament (the Rome Masters) of the 1977 Italian Open tennis championships took place in Rome between 16 May and 1 July 1977. 64 players from 19 countries competed in the 6-round tournament. The final winner was Vitas Gerulaitis of the US, who defeated Antonio Zugarelli of Italy. The defending champion from 1976, Adriano Panatta of Italy, was eliminated in the quarter-finals by Gerulaitis.

== Seeds ==
1. (Italy) Adriano Panatta (quarterfinals)
2. (Argentina) Guillermo Vilas (second round)
3. (Romania) Ilie Năstase (quarterfinals)
4. (United States) Brian Gottfried (semifinals)
5. (Mexico) Raúl Ramírez (second round)
6. (Spain) ~~Manuel Orantes~~ (withdrew)
7. (United States) Roscoe Tanner (first round)
8. (United States) Vitas Gerulaitis (champion)
9. (Italy) Corrado Barazzutti (second round)
10. (Czechoslovakia) Jan Kodeš (third round)
11. (United States) Bill Scanlon (third round)
12. (Australia) Phil Dent (semifinals)
13. (Italy) Antonio Zugarelli (final)
14. (Hungary) Balázs Taróczy (second round)
15. (Italy) Paolo Bertolucci (second round)
16. (Australia) Dick Crealy (second round)

== Draw ==
=== Key ===
- Q = Qualifier
- WC = Wild card
- LL = Lucky loser
- Alt = Alternate
- ITF = ITF entry
- PR = Protected ranking
- SR = Special ranking
- SE = Special exempt
- JE = Junior exempt
- JR = Junior Accelerator Programme entrant
- CO = College Accelerator Programme entrant
- NG = Next Gen Accelerator Program entrant
- w/o = Walkover
- r = Retired
- d = Defaulted

=== Finals ===
Quarterfinals
1	(Italy) Adriano Panatta	6	6	3
8	(United States) Vitas Gerulaitis	1	7	6
4	(United States) Brian Gottfried	7	6
(Australia) Kim Warwick	5	2
12	(Australia) Phil Dent	6	6
3	(Romania) Ilie Năstase	3	2
(Paraguay) Víctor Pecci	6	6
13	(Italy) Antonio Zugarelli	7	7

Semifinals
8	(United States) Vitas Gerulaitis	6	7	4	7
4	(United States) Brian Gottfried	2	6	6	5
12	(Australia) Phil Dent	4	7	4	2
13	(Italy) Antonio Zugarelli	6	5	6	6

Final
8	(United States) Vitas Gerulaitis	6	7	3	7
13	(Italy) Antonio Zugarelli	2	6	6	6

=== Top half ===
==== Section 1 ====
First round
1	(Italy) A Panatta	6	6
(United States) N Saviano	1	3
(United States) T Gullikson	7	6
(West Germany) F Gebert	5	3
16	(Australia) D Crealy	6	6
(United Kingdom) J Lloyd	1	2
Q	(Spain) J Soler	5	5
(United States) T Waltke	7	7
8	(United States) V Gerulaitis	6	6
(Australia) C Dibley	3	2
(United States) V Amaya	6	0	6
(France) J-F Caujolle	4	6	4
10	(Czechoslovakia) J Kodeš	7	5	6
(Rhodesia) C Dowdeswell	5	7	1
(Italy) V Franchitti	6	6	2
Q	(United Kingdom) J Feaver	3	7	6

Second round
1	(Italy) A Panatta	6	6
(United States) T Gullikson	2	2
16	(Australia) D Crealy	6	7
(United States) T Waltke	4	5
8	(United States) V Gerulaitis	6	6
(United States) V Amaya	0	3
10	(Czechoslovakia) J Kodeš	6	4	6
Q	(United Kingdom) J Feaver	4	6	4

Third round
1	(Italy) A Panatta	6	6
(United States) T Waltke	4	3
8	(United States) V Gerulaitis	6	6
10	(Czechoslovakia) J Kodeš	4	3

Quarterfinals
1	(Italy) A Panatta	6	6	3
8	(United States) V Gerulaitis	1	7	6

==== Section 2 ====
First round
4	(United States) B Gottfried	6	6
(Italy) G Marchetti	0	1
Q	(Czechoslovakia) T Šmíd	6	6
(United States) S Stewart	2	3
15	(Italy) P Bertolucci	6	2	6
(Australia) M Edmondson	2	6	1
(United States) C Hagey	1	1
Q	(Socialist Federal Republic of Yugoslavia) N Špear	6	6
5	(Mexico) R Ramírez	6	6
(United States) G Mayer	3	0
(Australia) K Warwick	5	6	6
Q	(Czechoslovakia) J Granát	7	4	3
11	(United States) B Scanlon	6	6
(United States) P DuPré	3	4
(Argentina) L Álvarez	1	6	6
(United States) P Fleming	6	3	4

Second round
4	(United States) B Gottfried	6	6
Q	(Czechoslovakia) T Šmíd	3	3
15	(Italy) P Bertolucci	4	4
Q	(Socialist Federal Republic of Yugoslavia) N Špear	6	6
5	(Mexico) R Ramírez	6	4	2
(Australia) K Warwick	4	6	6
11	(United States) B Scanlon	4	6	6
(Argentina) L Álvarez	6	4	2

Third round
4	(United States) B Gottfried	6	6
Q	(Socialist Federal Republic of Yugoslavia) N Špear	3	3
(Australia) K Warwick	0	6	6
11	(United States) B Scanlon	6	1	1

Quarterfinals
4	(United States) B Gottfried	7	6
(Australia) K Warwick	5	2

=== Bottom half ===
==== Section 3 ====
First round
(United States) D Bohrnstedt	3	6
(United States) B Teacher	6	7
(Italy) M di Domenico	5	3
12	(Australia) P Dent	7	6
Q	(France) É Deblicker	5	6	6
(New Zealand) O Parun	7	3	3
(Italy) G Ocleppo	3	6	6
(South Africa) D Schneider	6	2	3
(South Africa) B Hewitt	6	6
(South Africa) B Bertram	4	4
(India) S Menon	3	1
14	(Hungary) B Taróczy	6	6
(Spain) J Higueras	3	6	4
(Argentina) R Cano	6	4	6
(Chile) B Prajoux	2	4
3	(Romania) I Năstase	6	6

Second round
(United States) B Teacher	1	4
12	(Australia) P Dent	6	6
Q	(France) É Deblicker	6	6
(Italy) G Ocleppo	1	4
(South Africa) B Hewitt	6	6
14	(Hungary) B Taróczy	4	4
(Argentina) R Cano	6	6	2
3	(Romania) I Năstase	7	1	6

Third round
12	(Australia) P Dent	6	6
Q	(France) É Deblicker	1	4
(South Africa) B Hewitt	3	5
3	(Romania) I Năstase	6	7

Quarterfinals
12	(Australia) P Dent	6	6
3	(Romania) I Năstase	3	2

==== Section 4 ====
First round
(Paraguay) V Pecci	6	3	7
(United States) J Delaney	3	6	5
Q	(Australia) P McNamee	6	3	2
9	(Italy) C Barazzutti	4	6	6
Q	(Romania) D Hărădău	3	6	3
(Romania) I Țiriac	6	2	6
(South Africa) B Mitton	4	6	6
7	(United States) R Tanner	6	3	4
(United States) S Krulevitz	3	6	6
(United States) F McNair	6	3	4
(Italy) Roberto Lombardi	6	4	2
13	(Italy) A Zugarelli	3	6	6
(Socialist Federal Republic of Yugoslavia) Ž Franulović	3	6	6
(United States) B Martin	6	0	0
(United Kingdom) R Taylor	1	2
2	(Argentina) G Vilas	6	6

Second round
(Paraguay) V Pecci	7	6
9	(Italy) C Barazzutti	6	2
(Romania) I Țiriac	6	7
(South Africa) B Mitton	2	6
(United States) S Krulevitz	3	3
13	(Italy) A Zugarelli	6	6
(Socialist Federal Republic of Yugoslavia) Ž Franulović	7	6
2	(Argentina) G Vilas	5	4

Third round
(Paraguay) V Pecci	7	2	6
(Romania) I Țiriac	5	6	4
13	(Italy) A Zugarelli	6	1	6
(Socialist Federal Republic of Yugoslavia) Ž Franulović	1	6	0

Quarterfinals
(Paraguay) V Pecci	6	6
13	(Italy) A Zugarelli	7	7
