= Monte-Carlo Masters =

Coordinates: 43°45′06″N 7°26′26.62″E

ATP Tour
- Founded: 1896; 130 years ago
- Editions: 119 (2026)
- Location: Roquebrune-Cap-Martin; France
- Venue: Monte Carlo Country Club
- Category: Masters 1000
- Surface: Clay / outdoors
- Draw: 56S / 28Q / 24D
- Prize money: €6,309,095 (2026)
- Website: montecarlotennismasters.com

Current champions (2026)
- Singles: (Italy) Jannik Sinner
- Doubles: (Germany) Kevin Krawietz / (Germany) Tim Pütz

The Monte-Carlo Masters, known as the Rolex Monte-Carlo Masters for sponsorship reasons, is an annual tennis tournament for male professional players held in Roquebrune-Cap-Martin, France, which borders on Monaco. It is played on clay courts at the Monte Carlo Country Club and is held in April. The tournament is one of the nine ATP Masters 1000 tournaments on the ATP Tour. Rafael Nadal won the men's singles title a record eleven times, including in eight consecutive editions.

The event was founded in 1896 as the Monte-Carlo International. The following year the event officially became known as the Monte-Carlo Championships, also known as the Monte-Carlo International Championships, which was a combined men's and women's tournament until 1982 when the women's championships ceased.

== History ==
In April 1896, the first Monte Carlo International lawn tennis tournament was established. The first men's singles was won by George Whiteside Hillyard, according to Wimbledon librarian Alan Little. He states that the women's event was won by either a Miss K. Booth of Great Britain or a Mlle Guillon of France; despite extensive research, he could not conclusively find the results.

The tournament was played on the red shale clay courts of the Lawn Tennis de Monte-Carlo club in cellars underneath the Grand Hôtel de Paris until 1905. In 1906, the event and club was moved to La Condamine where it was played between then and 1914 and again in 1920. It was played briefly on the roof of a garage in Beausoleil before three tennis courts were constructed with spectator stands and a new club house on 28 January 1921; the new venue was named the "La Festa Country Club".

It became an "Open" event in 1969. In 1971 to 1972 and from 1978 to 1989 it was a major tournament on the Grand Prix Tour. In 1973 the tournament was part of the Rothmans Spring Mediterranean Circuit. From 1974 to 1977 the tournament was part of the World Championship Tennis (WCT) circuit. In 1990 it became an ATP Championship Series Single Week tennis event (later called the Masters series). Beginning in 2009, Monte Carlo became the only Masters tournament not to have a mandatory player commitment.

Rafael Nadal won the title eight consecutive times between 2005 and 2012, making him the only tennis player in the Open Era to win eight consecutive titles at the same international tournament. In 2018, Nadal won his eleventh title, the all-time record.

== Prize money ==
The total prize money for the 2026 Monte Carlo Master 1000 was €6,309,095. The package is divided as follows:

Event	W	F	SF	QF	Round of 16	Round of 32	Round of 56
Singles	€974,370	€532,120	€290,960	€158,700	€84,890	€45,520	€25,220
Doubles	€298,950	€162,400	€89,210	€49,220	€27,050	€14,770	—N/a

== Past finals ==
=== Men's singles ===
Year	Champion	Runner-up	Score
1896	(United Kingdom of Great Britain and Ireland) George Whiteside Hillyard (1/1)	(Germany) Victor Voss	6–3, 6–2, 6–3
1897	(United Kingdom of Great Britain and Ireland) Reginald Doherty (1/6)	(United Kingdom of Great Britain and Ireland) Conway W. Blackwood Price	6–2, 6–1, 6–2
1898	(United Kingdom of Great Britain and Ireland) Reginald Doherty (2/6)	(Germany) Victor Voss	4–6, 6–3, 6–3, 4–0 ret.
1899	(United Kingdom of Great Britain and Ireland) Reginald Doherty (3/6)	(Germany) Victor Voss	6–2, ret.
1900	(United Kingdom of Great Britain and Ireland) Laurence Doherty (1/4)	(might not have been played)	
1901	(United Kingdom of Great Britain and Ireland) Laurence Doherty (2/4)	(United Kingdom of Great Britain and Ireland) Wilberforce Eaves	6–2, 5–7, 6–1
1902	(United Kingdom of Great Britain and Ireland) Reginald Doherty (4/6)	(United Kingdom of Great Britain and Ireland) George Hillyard	6–1, 6–4, 6–3
1903	(United Kingdom of Great Britain and Ireland) Reginald Doherty (5/6)	(United Kingdom of Great Britain and Ireland) Frank Riseley	6–1, 14–16, ret.
1904	(United Kingdom of Great Britain and Ireland) Reginald Doherty (6/6)	(United Kingdom of Great Britain and Ireland) Josiah Ritchie	6–1, 7–5, 3–6, 7–5
1905	(United Kingdom of Great Britain and Ireland) Laurence Doherty (3/4)	(United Kingdom of Great Britain and Ireland) Josiah Ritchie	6–4, 8–6, 6–4
1906	(United Kingdom of Great Britain and Ireland) Laurence Doherty (4/4)	(United Kingdom of Great Britain and Ireland) Wilberforce Eaves	6–3, 11–9
1907	(United Kingdom of Great Britain and Ireland) Josiah Ritchie (1/1)	(United Kingdom of Great Britain and Ireland) Laurence Doherty	8–6, 7–5, 8–6
1908	(New Zealand) Anthony Wilding (1/5)	(United Kingdom of Great Britain and Ireland) Wilberforce Eaves	6–3, 2–6, 6–3, 4–6, 6–0
1909	(United States) Fred Alexander (1/1)	(United Kingdom of Great Britain and Ireland) Laurence Doherty	7–5, 6–4, 6–1
1910	(France) Max Decugis (1/1)	(United Kingdom of Great Britain and Ireland) Josiah Ritchie	6–3, 6–0, 6–0
1911	(New Zealand) Anthony Wilding (2/5)	(France) Max Decugis	5–7, 1–6, 6–3, 6–0, 6–1
1912	(New Zealand) Anthony Wilding (3/5)	(United Kingdom of Great Britain and Ireland) C. Moore	6–3, 6–0, 6–0
1913	(New Zealand) Anthony Wilding (4/5)	(France) Félix Poulin	6–0, 6–2, 6–1
1914	(New Zealand) Anthony Wilding (5/5)	(United Kingdom of Great Britain and Ireland) Gordon Lowe	6–2, 6–3, 6–2
1915; 1918	not held (due to World War I)		
1919	(Romania) Nicolae Mișu (1/1)	(France) Max Decugis	6–2, 6–0
1920	(United Kingdom of Great Britain and Ireland) Gordon Lowe (1/3)	(United Kingdom of Great Britain and Ireland) Josiah Ritchie	7–5, 6–2
1921	(United Kingdom of Great Britain and Ireland) Gordon Lowe (2/3)	(United Kingdom of Great Britain and Ireland) Algernon Kingscote	6–1, 0–6, 6–4, 6–2
1922	(Italy) Giovanni Balbi di Robecco (1/1)	(France) Alain Gerbault	6–1, 6–4, 6–3
1923	(United Kingdom) Gordon Lowe (3/3)	(United Kingdom) F. R. L. Crawford	6–2, 6–4, 6–4
1924	(United Kingdom) F. R. Leighton Crawford (1/1)	(France) Léonce Aslangul	6–4, 3–6, 6–2
1926	(Hungary) Béla von Kehrling (1/2)	(United Kingdom) Charles Kingsley	6–4, 6–1, 6–3
1927	(Hungary) Béla von Kehrling (2/2)	(Denmark) Erik Worm	walkover
1928	(France) Henri Cochet (1/3)	(Hungary) Béla von Kehrling	3–6, 2–6, 6–3, 6–3, 6–2
1929	(France) Henri Cochet (2/3)	(Italy) Umberto De Morpurgo	8–6, 6–4, 6–4
1930	(United States) Bill Tilden (1/1)	(United Kingdom) Bunny Austin	6–4, 6–4, 6–1
1931	(France) Henri Cochet (3/3)	(Republic of Ireland) George Lyttleton-Rogers	7–5, 6–2, 6–4
1932	(Czechoslovakia) Roderich Menzel (1/1)	(Republic of Ireland) George Lyttleton-Rogers	6–4, 7–5, 6–2
1933	(United Kingdom) Bunny Austin (1/2)	(Republic of Ireland) George Lyttleton-Rogers	11–9, 6–3, 7–5
1934	(United Kingdom) Bunny Austin (2/2)	(Italy) Giorgio de Stefani	6–1, 8–6, 6–4
1935	(Italy) Giovanni Palmieri (1/1)	(United Kingdom) Bunny Austin	6–1, 6–1, 7–5
1936	(Germany) Gottfried von Cramm (1/2)	(Germany) Henner Henkel	4–6, 4–6, 7–5, 6–4, 7–5
1937	(Germany) Gottfried von Cramm (2/2)	(France) Christian Boussus	6–2, 3–6, 6–2, 2–6, 6–2
1938	(Kingdom of Yugoslavia) Franjo Punčec (1/1)	(France) Christian Boussus	6–0, 6–1, 6–1
1939	(France) Pierre Pellizza (1/2)	(France) Yvon Petra	6–8, 6–3, 6–4, 6–2
1940; 1945	not held (due to World War II)		
1946	(France) Pierre Pellizza (2/2)	(France) Yvon Petra	6–3, 6–2, 4–6, 6–3
1947	(Sweden) Lennart Bergelin (1/1)	(United States) Budge Patty	6–3, 6–8, 1–6, 6–2, 8–6
1948	(Hungary) József Asbóth (1/1)	(Italy) Giovanni Cucelli	6–3, 6–2, 5–7, 6–2
1949	(United States) Frank Parker (1/1)	(Italy) Giovanni Cucelli	2–6, 6–3, 6–0, 6–4
1950	(Egypt) Jaroslav Drobný (1/1)	(United States) William Talbert	6–4, 6–4, 6–1
1951	(United States) Straight Clark (1/1)	(United States) Fred Kovaleski	1–6, 6–4, 6–4, 1–6, 10–8
1952	(Australia) Frank Sedgman (1/1)	(Egypt) Jaroslav Drobný	7–5, 6–2, 5–7, 6–1
1953	(Poland) Władysław Skonecki (1/2)	(Egypt) Jaroslav Drobný	6–3, 6–4, 11–9
1954	(Canada) Lorne Main (1/1)	(United States) Tony Vincent	9–7, 3–6, 7–5, 6–4
1955	(Poland) Władysław Skonecki (2/2)	(United States) Budge Patty	6–4, 6–2, 8–6
1956	(United States) Hugh Stewart (1/1)	(United States) Tony Vincent	1–6, 8–6, 6–0, 6–2
1957	(Belgium) Jacques Brichant (1/1)	(France) Paul Rémy	3–6, 5–5 ret.
1958	(France) Robert Haillet (1/2)	(Egypt) Jaroslav Drobný	6–4, 6–4, 6–3
1959	(France) Robert Haillet (2/2)	(United States) Budge Patty	9–7, 6–3, 4–6, 6–3
1960	(Spain) Andrés Gimeno (1/1)	(United Kingdom) Mike Davies	8–6, 6–3, 6–4
1961	(Italy) Nicola Pietrangeli (1/3)	(France) Pierre Darmon	6–4, 1–6, 6–3, 6–3
1962	(France) Pierre Darmon (1/2)	(Socialist Federal Republic of Yugoslavia) Boro Jovanović	6–2, 6–1, 6–3
1963	(France) Pierre Darmon (2/2)	(Sweden) Jan-Erik Lundqvist	6–2, 2–6, 6–1, 5–7, 6–4
1964	(Australia) Martin Mulligan (1/1)	(Sweden) Jan-Erik Lundqvist	6–4, 6–4
1965	(Hungary) István Gulyás (1/1)	(Czechoslovakia) Jiří Javorský	6–3, 7–9, 8–6, 6–4
1966	(Spain) Manuel Santana (1/1)	(Italy) Nicola Pietrangeli	8–6, 4–6, 6–4, 6–1
1967	(Italy) Nicola Pietrangeli (2/3)	(Australia) Martin Mulligan	6–3, 3–6, 6–3, 6–1
1968	(Italy) Nicola Pietrangeli (3/3)	(Soviet Union) Alex Metreveli	6–2, 6–2
↓ Open era ↓
1969	(Netherlands) Tom Okker (1/1)	(Australia) John Newcombe	8–10, 6–1, 7–5, 6–3
1970	(Socialist Federal Republic of Yugoslavia) Željko Franulović (1/1)	(Spain) Manuel Orantes	6–4, 6–3, 6–3
↓ Grand Prix circuit ↓
1971	(Romania) Ilie Năstase (1/3)	(Netherlands) Tom Okker	3–6, 8–6, 6–1, 6–1
1972	(Romania) Ilie Năstase (2/3)	(Czechoslovakia) František Pála	6–1, 6–0, 6–3
↓ Rothmans Spring Mediterranean Circuit ↓
1973	(Romania) Ilie Năstase (3/3)	(Sweden) Björn Borg	6–4, 6–1, 6–2
↓ WCT circuit ↓
1974	(Rhodesia) Andrew Pattison (1/1)	(Romania) Ilie Năstase	5–7, 6–3, 6–4
1975	(Spain) Manuel Orantes (1/1)	(South Africa) Bob Hewitt	6–2, 6–4
1976	(Argentina) Guillermo Vilas (1/2)	(Poland) Wojciech Fibak	6–1, 6–1, 6–4
1977	(Sweden) Björn Borg (1/3)	(Italy) Corrado Barazzutti	6–3, 7–5, 6–0
↓ Grand Prix circuit ↓
1978	(Mexico) Raúl Ramírez (1/1)	(Czechoslovakia) Tomáš Šmíd	6–3, 6–3, 6–4
1979	(Sweden) Björn Borg (2/3)	(United States) Vitas Gerulaitis	6–2, 6–1, 6–3
1980	(Sweden) Björn Borg (3/3)	(Argentina) Guillermo Vilas	6–1, 6–0, 6–2
1981	(no winner)	(United States) Jimmy Connors (Argentina) Guillermo Vilas	5–5 (abandoned due to rain)
1982	(Argentina) Guillermo Vilas (2/2)	(Czechoslovakia) Ivan Lendl	6–1, 7–6^{(7–3)}, 6–3
1983	(Sweden) Mats Wilander (1/2)	(United States) Mel Purcell	6–1, 6–2, 6–3
1984	(Sweden) Henrik Sundström (1/1)	(Sweden) Mats Wilander	6–3, 7–5, 6–2
1985	(Czechoslovakia) Ivan Lendl (1/2)	(Sweden) Mats Wilander	6–1, 6–3, 4–6, 6–4
1986	(Sweden) Joakim Nyström (1/1)	(France) Yannick Noah	6–3, 6–2
1987	(Sweden) Mats Wilander (2/2)	(United States) Jimmy Arias	4–6, 7–5, 6–1, 6–3
1988	(Czechoslovakia) Ivan Lendl (2/2)	(Argentina) Martín Jaite	5–7, 6–4, 7–5, 6–3
1989	(Argentina) Alberto Mancini (1/1)	(West Germany) Boris Becker	7–5, 2–6, 7–6^{(7–4)}, 7–5
↓ ATP Tour Masters 1000 (Note: known as Championship Series, single week from 1990 till 1995, Super 9 from 1996 till 1999 and Masters Series from 2000 till 2008.) ↓
1990	(Soviet Union) Andrei Chesnokov (1/1)	(Austria) Thomas Muster	7–5, 6–3, 6–3
1991	(Spain) Sergi Bruguera (1/2)	(Germany) Boris Becker	5–7, 6–4, 7–6^{(8–6)}, 7–6^{(7–4)}
1992	(Austria) Thomas Muster (1/3)	(United States) Aaron Krickstein	6–3, 6–1, 6–3
1993	(Spain) Sergi Bruguera (2/2)	(France) Cédric Pioline	7–6^{(7–2)}, 6–0
1994	(Ukraine) Andrei Medvedev (1/1)	(Spain) Sergi Bruguera	7–5, 6–1, 6–3
1995	(Austria) Thomas Muster (2/3)	(Germany) Boris Becker	4–6, 5–7, 6–1, 7–6^{(8–6)}, 6–0
1996	(Austria) Thomas Muster (3/3)	(Spain) Albert Costa	6–3, 5–7, 4–6, 6–3, 6–2
1997	(Chile) Marcelo Ríos (1/1)	(Spain) Àlex Corretja	6–4, 6–3, 6–3
1998	(Spain) Carlos Moyá (1/1)	(France) Cédric Pioline	6–3, 6–0, 7–5
1999	(Brazil) Gustavo Kuerten (1/2)	(Chile) Marcelo Ríos	6–4, 2–1 ret.
2000	(France) Cédric Pioline (1/1)	(Slovakia) Dominik Hrbatý	6–4, 7–6^{(7–3)}, 7–6^{(8–6)}
2001	(Brazil) Gustavo Kuerten (2/2)	(Morocco) Hicham Arazi	6–3, 6–2, 6–4
2002	(Spain) Juan Carlos Ferrero (1/2)	(Spain) Carlos Moyá	7–5, 6–3, 6–4
2003	(Spain) Juan Carlos Ferrero (2/2)	(Argentina) Guillermo Coria	6–2, 6–2
2004	(Argentina) Guillermo Coria (1/1)	(Germany) Rainer Schüttler	6–2, 6–1, 6–3
2005	(Spain) Rafael Nadal (1/11)	(Argentina) Guillermo Coria	6–3, 6–1, 0–6, 7–5
2006	(Spain) Rafael Nadal (2/11)	(Switzerland) Roger Federer	6–2, 6–7^{(2–7)}, 6–3, 7–6^{(7–5)}
2007	(Spain) Rafael Nadal (3/11)	(Switzerland) Roger Federer	6–4, 6–4
2008	(Spain) Rafael Nadal (4/11)	(Switzerland) Roger Federer	7–5, 7–5
2009	(Spain) Rafael Nadal (5/11)	(Serbia) Novak Djokovic	6–3, 2–6, 6–1
2010	(Spain) Rafael Nadal (6/11)	(Spain) Fernando Verdasco	6–0, 6–1
2011	(Spain) Rafael Nadal (7/11)	(Spain) David Ferrer	6–4, 7–5
2012	(Spain) Rafael Nadal (8/11)	(Serbia) Novak Djokovic	6–3, 6–1
2013	(Serbia) Novak Djokovic (1/2)	(Spain) Rafael Nadal	6–2, 7–6^{(7–1)}
2014	(Switzerland) Stan Wawrinka (1/1)	(Switzerland) Roger Federer	4–6, 7–6^{(7–5)}, 6–2
2015	(Serbia) Novak Djokovic (2/2)	(Czech Republic) Tomáš Berdych	7–5, 4–6, 6–3
2016	(Spain) Rafael Nadal (9/11)	(France) Gaël Monfils	7–5, 5–7, 6–0
2017	(Spain) Rafael Nadal (10/11)	(Spain) Albert Ramos Viñolas	6–1, 6–3
2018	(Spain) Rafael Nadal (11/11)	(Japan) Kei Nishikori	6–3, 6–2
2019	(Italy) Fabio Fognini (1/1)	(Serbia) Dušan Lajović	6−3, 6−4
2020	not held (due to COVID-19 pandemic)		
2021	(Greece) Stefanos Tsitsipas (1/3)	(Russia) Andrey Rublev	6−3, 6−3
2022	(Greece) Stefanos Tsitsipas (2/3)	(Spain) Alejandro Davidovich Fokina	6−3, 7–6^{(7–3)}
2023	(Note: competed under no flag due to the Russian invasion of Ukraine.) Andrey Rublev (1/1)	(Denmark) Holger Rune	5−7, 6−2, 7−5
2024	(Greece) Stefanos Tsitsipas (3/3)	(Norway) Casper Ruud	6−1, 6–4
2025	(Spain) Carlos Alcaraz (1/1)	(Italy) Lorenzo Musetti	3–6, 6–1, 6–0
2026	(Italy) Jannik Sinner (1/1)	(Spain) Carlos Alcaraz	7–6^{(7–5)}, 6–3

=== Men's doubles ===
Open era:

Year	Champions	Runners-up	Score
1969	(Australia) Owen Davidson (Australia) John Newcombe	(United States) Pancho Gonzales (United States) Dennis Ralston	7–5, 11–13, 6–2, 6–1
1970	(United States) Marty Riessen (United Kingdom) Roger Taylor	(France) Pierre Barthès (Socialist Federal Republic of Yugoslavia) Nikola Pilić	6–3, 6–4, 6–2
↓ Grand Prix circuit ↓
1971	(Romania) Ilie Năstase (Romania) Ion Țiriac	(Netherlands) Tom Okker (United Kingdom) Roger Taylor	1–6, 6–3, 6–3, 8–6
1972	(France) Patrice Beust (France) Daniel Contet	(Czechoslovakia) Jiří Hřebec (Czechoslovakia) František Pála	3–6, 6–1, 12–10, 6–2
↓ Rothmans Spring Mediterranean Circuit ↓
1973	(Spain) Juan Gisbert Sr. (Romania) Ilie Năstase (2)	(France) Georges Goven (France) Patrick Proisy	6–2, 6–2, 6–2
↓ WCT circuit ↓
1974	(Australia) John Alexander (Australia) Phil Dent	(Spain) Manuel Orantes (Australia) Tony Roche	7–6^{(7–5)}, 4–6, 7–6^{(7–5)}, 6–3
1975	(South Africa) Bob Hewitt (South Africa) Frew McMillan	(United States) Arthur Ashe (Netherlands) Tom Okker	6–3, 6–2
1976	(Poland) Wojciech Fibak (West Germany) Karl Meiler	(Sweden) Björn Borg (Argentina) Guillermo Vilas	7–6^{(7–5)}, 6–1
1977	(France) François Jauffret (Czechoslovakia) Jan Kodeš	(Poland) Wojciech Fibak (Netherlands) Tom Okker	2–6, 6–3, 6–2
↓ Grand Prix circuit ↓
1978	(United States) Peter Fleming (Czechoslovakia) Tomáš Šmíd	(Chile) Jaime Fillol (Romania) Ilie Năstase	6–4, 7–5
1979	(Romania) Ilie Năstase (3) (Mexico) Raúl Ramírez	(Paraguay) Víctor Pecci (Hungary) Balázs Taróczy	6–3, 6–4
1980	(Italy) Paolo Bertolucci (Italy) Adriano Panatta	(United States) Vitas Gerulaitis (United States) John McEnroe	6–2, 5–7, 6–3
1981	(Switzerland) Heinz Günthardt (Hungary) Balázs Taróczy	(Czechoslovakia) Pavel Složil (Czechoslovakia) Tomáš Šmíd	6–3, 6–3
1982	(Australia) Peter McNamara (Australia) Paul McNamee	(Australia) Mark Edmondson (United States) Sherwood Stewart	6–7, 7–6, 6–3
1983	(Switzerland) Heinz Günthardt (2) (Hungary) Balázs Taróczy (2)	(France) Henri Leconte (France) Yannick Noah	6–2, 6–4
1984	(Australia) Mark Edmondson (United States) Sherwood Stewart	(Sweden) Jan Gunnarsson (Sweden) Mats Wilander	6–2, 6–1
1985	(Czechoslovakia) Pavel Složil (Czechoslovakia) Tomáš Šmíd (2)	(Israel) Shlomo Glickstein (Israel) Shahar Perkiss	6–2, 6–3
1986	(France) Guy Forget (France) Yannick Noah	(Sweden) Joakim Nyström (Sweden) Mats Wilander	6–4, 3–6, 6–4
1987	(Chile) Hans Gildemeister (Ecuador) Andrés Gómez	(Iran) Mansour Bahrami (Denmark) Michael Mortensen	6–2, 6–4
1988	(Spain) Sergio Casal (Spain) Emilio Sánchez	(France) Henri Leconte (Czechoslovakia) Ivan Lendl	6–1, 6–3
1989	(Czechoslovakia) Tomáš Šmíd (3) (Australia) Mark Woodforde	(Italy) Paolo Canè (Italy) Diego Nargiso	1–6, 6–4, 6–2
↓ ATP Tour Masters 1000 ↓
1990	(Czechoslovakia) Petr Korda (Czechoslovakia) Tomáš Šmíd (4)	(Ecuador) Andrés Gómez (Spain) Javier Sánchez	6–4, 7–6
1991	(United States) Luke Jensen (Australia) Laurie Warder	(Netherlands) Paul Haarhuis (Netherlands) Mark Koevermans	5–7, 7–6, 6–4
1992	(Germany) Boris Becker (Germany) Michael Stich	(Czechoslovakia) Petr Korda (Czechoslovakia) Karel Nováček	6–4, 6–4
1993	(Sweden) Stefan Edberg (Czech Republic) Petr Korda (2)	(Netherlands) Paul Haarhuis (Netherlands) Mark Koevermans	3–6, 6–2, 7–6
1994	(Sweden) Nicklas Kulti (Sweden) Magnus Larsson	(Russia) Yevgeny Kafelnikov (Czech Republic) Daniel Vacek	3–6, 7–6, 6–4
1995	(Netherlands) Jacco Eltingh (Netherlands) Paul Haarhuis	(Argentina) Luis Lobo (Spain) Javier Sánchez	6–3, 6–4
1996	(South Africa) Ellis Ferreira (Netherlands) Jan Siemerink	(Sweden) Jonas Björkman (Sweden) Nicklas Kulti	2–6, 6–3, 6–2
1997	(United States) Donald Johnson (United States) Francisco Montana	(Netherlands) Jacco Eltingh (Netherlands) Paul Haarhuis	7–6, 2–6, 7–6
1998	(Netherlands) Jacco Eltingh (2) (Netherlands) Paul Haarhuis (2)	(Australia) Todd Woodbridge (Australia) Mark Woodforde	6–4, 6–2
1999	(France) Olivier Delaître (United Kingdom) Tim Henman	(Czech Republic) Jiří Novák (Czech Republic) David Rikl	6–2, 6–3
2000	(South Africa) Wayne Ferreira (Russia) Yevgeny Kafelnikov	(Netherlands) Paul Haarhuis (Australia) Sandon Stolle	6–3, 2–6, 6–1
2001	(Sweden) Jonas Björkman (Australia) Todd Woodbridge	(Australia) Joshua Eagle (Australia) Andrew Florent	3–6, 6–4, 6–2
2002	(Sweden) Jonas Björkman (2) (Australia) Todd Woodbridge (2)	(Netherlands) Paul Haarhuis (Russia) Yevgeny Kafelnikov	6–3, 3–6, [10–7]
2003	(India) Mahesh Bhupathi (Belarus) Max Mirnyi	(France) Michaël Llodra (France) Fabrice Santoro	6–4, 3–6, 7–6^{(8–6)}
2004	(United Kingdom) Tim Henman (2) (Serbia and Montenegro) Nenad Zimonjić	(Argentina) Gastón Etlis (Argentina) Martín Rodríguez	7–5, 6–2
2005	(India) Leander Paes (Serbia and Montenegro) Nenad Zimonjić (2)	(United States) Bob Bryan (United States) Mike Bryan	walkover
2006	(Sweden) Jonas Björkman (3) (Belarus) Max Mirnyi (2)	(France) Fabrice Santoro (Serbia and Montenegro) Nenad Zimonjić	6–2, 7–6^{(7–2)}
2007	(United States) Bob Bryan (United States) Mike Bryan	(France) Julien Benneteau (France) Richard Gasquet	6–2, 6–1
2008	(Spain) Rafael Nadal (Spain) Tommy Robredo	(India) Mahesh Bhupathi (The Bahamas) Mark Knowles	6–3, 6–3
2009	(Canada) Daniel Nestor (Serbia) Nenad Zimonjić (3)	(United States) Bob Bryan (United States) Mike Bryan	6–1, 6–4
2010	(Canada) Daniel Nestor (2) (Serbia) Nenad Zimonjić (4)	(India) Mahesh Bhupathi (Belarus) Max Mirnyi	6–3, 2–0 (ret.)
2011	(United States) Bob Bryan (2) (United States) Mike Bryan (2)	(Argentina) Juan Ignacio Chela (Brazil) Bruno Soares	6–3, 6–2
2012	(United States) Bob Bryan (3) (United States) Mike Bryan (3)	(Belarus) Max Mirnyi (Canada) Daniel Nestor	6–2, 6–3
2013	(France) Julien Benneteau (Serbia) Nenad Zimonjić (5)	(United States) Bob Bryan (United States) Mike Bryan	4–6, 7–6^{(7–4)}, [14–12]
2014	(United States) Bob Bryan (4) (United States) Mike Bryan (4)	(Croatia) Ivan Dodig (Brazil) Marcelo Melo	6–3, 3–6, [10–8]
2015	(United States) Bob Bryan (5) (United States) Mike Bryan (5)	(Italy) Simone Bolelli (Italy) Fabio Fognini	7–6^{(7–3)}, 6–1
2016	(France) Pierre-Hugues Herbert (France) Nicolas Mahut	(United Kingdom) Jamie Murray (Brazil) Bruno Soares	4–6, 6–0, [10–6]
2017	(India) Rohan Bopanna (Uruguay) Pablo Cuevas	(Spain) Feliciano López (Spain) Marc López	6–3, 3–6, [10–4]
2018	(United States) Bob Bryan (6) (United States) Mike Bryan (6)	(Austria) Oliver Marach (Croatia) Mate Pavić	7–6^{(7–5)}, 6–3
2019	(Croatia) Nikola Mektić (Croatia) Franko Škugor	(Netherlands) Robin Haase (Netherlands) Wesley Koolhof	6–7^{(3–7)}, 7–6^{(7–3)}, [11–9]
2020	no competition (due to COVID-19 pandemic)		
2021	(Croatia) Nikola Mektić (2) (Croatia) Mate Pavić	(United Kingdom) Dan Evans (United Kingdom) Neal Skupski	6–3, 4–6, [10–7]
2022	(United States) Rajeev Ram (United Kingdom) Joe Salisbury	(Colombia) Juan Sebastián Cabal (Colombia) Robert Farah	6–4, 3–6, [10–7]
2023	(Croatia) Ivan Dodig (United States) Austin Krajicek	(Monaco) Romain Arneodo (Austria) Sam Weissborn	6–0, 4–6, [14–12]
2024	(Belgium) Sander Gillé (Belgium) Joran Vliegen	(Brazil) Marcelo Melo (Germany) Alexander Zverev	5–7, 6–3, [10–5]
2025	(Monaco) Romain Arneodo (France) Manuel Guinard	(United Kingdom) Julian Cash (United Kingdom) Lloyd Glasspool	1–6, 7–6^{(10–8)}, [10–8]
2026	(Germany) Kevin Krawietz (Germany) Tim Pütz	(El Salvador) Marcelo Arévalo (Croatia) Mate Pavić	4–6, 6–2, [10–8]

=== Women's singles ===
(incomplete roll)

Year	Champions	Runners-up	Score
1896.	(United Kingdom of Great Britain and Ireland) Katherine Booth (1/1)	(France) Mlle Guillon	?
1898	(France) Marguerite Chalier (1/1)	(United States) Vera Warden	6–4, 3–6, 6–2
1901	(United Kingdom of Great Britain and Ireland) Blanche Bingley Hillyard (1/1)	(United Kingdom of Great Britain and Ireland) Mildred Brooksmith	6–2, 6–1
1902	(Germany) Clara von der Schulenburg (1/1)	(United Kingdom of Great Britain and Ireland) Mildred Brooksmith	6–2, 6–3
1903	(United Kingdom of Great Britain and Ireland) Toupie Lowther (1/1)	(United Kingdom of Great Britain and Ireland) Mildred Brooksmith	6–3, 6–1
1904	(Italy) Margherita de Robiglio (1/1)	(Germany) Clara von der Schulenburg	6–2, 6–2
1905	(United Kingdom of Great Britain and Ireland) Dorothea Douglass (1/2)	(United Kingdom of Great Britain and Ireland) Connie Wilson	6–4, 6–1
1906	(United Kingdom of Great Britain and Ireland) Gladys Eastlake-Smith (1/3)	(United Kingdom of Great Britain and Ireland) Amy Ransome	6–4, 6–2
1907	(United Kingdom of Great Britain and Ireland) Gladys Eastlake-Smith (2/3)	(United Kingdom of Great Britain and Ireland) Rosamund Salusbury	6–4, 4–6, 6–4
1908	(United Kingdom of Great Britain and Ireland) Gladys Eastlake-Smith (3/3)	(United Kingdom of Great Britain and Ireland) Evelyn Dillon	6–3, 6–4
1909	(United Kingdom of Great Britain and Ireland) Alice Greene (1/1)	(Germany) Clara von der Schulenburg	4–6, 6–2, 6–4
1910	(United Kingdom of Great Britain and Ireland) Rosamund Salusbury (1/2)	(United Kingdom of Great Britain and Ireland) Mildred Brooksmith	4–6, 6–2, 6–2
1911	(United Kingdom of Great Britain and Ireland) Rosamund Salusbury (2/2)	(United Kingdom of Great Britain and Ireland) Blanche Duddell Colston	6–2, 6–4
1912	(United Kingdom of Great Britain and Ireland) Jessie Tripp (1/1)	(United Kingdom of Great Britain and Ireland) Margaret Tripp	default
1913	(United Kingdom of Great Britain and Ireland) Madeline Fisher O'Neill (1/1)	(United States) Elizabeth Ryan	6–3, 8–6
1914	(United Kingdom of Great Britain and Ireland) Dorothea Douglass Chambers (2/2)	(United States) Elizabeth Ryan	6–4, 6–1
1915/1918	not held (due to World War I)		
1919	(France) Suzanne Lenglen (1/3)	(Monaco) Doris Henrotin Wolfson	6–0, 6–0
1920	(France) Suzanne Lenglen (2/3)	(United States) Elizabeth Ryan	6–1, 6–2
1921	(France) Suzanne Lenglen (3/3)	(United States) Elizabeth Ryan	6–2, 6–0
1922	(United States) Elizabeth Ryan (1/4)	(United Kingdom) Geraldine Beamish	6–2, 6–1
1923	(United Kingdom) Kitty McKane (1/1)	(United States) Elizabeth Ryan	7–5 4–6 6–2
1924	(United States) Elizabeth Ryan (2/4)	(United Kingdom of Great Britain and Ireland) Phyllis Satterthwaite	6–2, 6–2
1925	(United States) Elizabeth Ryan (3/4)	(United Kingdom) Geraldine Beamish	divided title
1926	(United States) Helen Wills (1/1)	(Spain) Lili de Alvarez	6–2, 6–3
1927	(United States) Elizabeth Ryan (4/4)	(United Kingdom) Phyllis Satterthwaite	6–3, 6–4
1928	(United Kingdom) Eileen Bennett (1/1)	(United Kingdom) Cristobel Hardie	6–3, 7–5
1929	(United Kingdom) Betty Nuthall (1/1)	(United Kingdom) Eileen Bennett	7–5, 5–7, 6–4
1930	(Germany) Cilly Aussem (1/1)	(France) Simonne Mathieu	6–2, 6–1
1931	(France) Simonne Mathieu (1/4)	(United Kingdom) Phyllis Satterthwaite	4–6, 6–4, 7–5
1932	(France) Simonne Mathieu (2/4)	(United Kingdom) Sheila Hewitt	6–1, 6–4
1933	(Switzerland) Lolette Payot (1/1)	(France) Simonne Mathieu	6–0, 6–4
1934	(France) Sylvie Jung Henrotin (1/1)	(United Kingdom) Muriel Thomas	default
1935	(France) Simonne Mathieu (3/4)	(Italy) Lucia Valerio	6–2, 6–4
1936	(France) Simonne Mathieu (4/4)	(Poland) Jadwiga Jędrzejowska	6-1, 6-4
1937	(Denmark) Hilde Krahwinkel Sperling (1/2)	(France) Simonne Mathieu	8–6, ret.
1938	(Poland) Jadwiga Jędrzejowska (1/1)	(United Kingdom) Peggy Scriven	6–4, 6–3
1939	(Denmark) Hilde Krahwinkel Sperling (2/2)	(France) Simonne Mathieu	7–5, 6–8, 6–3
1940/1945	not held (due to World War II)		
1946	(Luxembourg) Alice Weiwers (1/1)	(Belgium) Yvonne Hoyaux Vincart	6–3, 6–2
1947	(Romania) Magda Berescu Rurac (1/1)	(United Kingdom) Jean Nicoll-Bostock	6–3, 6–8, 6–2
1948	(Hungary) Zsuzsa Körmöczy (1/6)	(Italy) Manuela Bologna	6–4, 3–6, 7–5
1949	(Italy) Annalisa Bossi (1/2)	(France) Anne-Marie Seghers	6–2, 6–3
1950	(United Kingdom) Jean Walker-Smith (1/1)	(France) Anne-Marie Seghers	7–5, 6–3
1951	(United States) Doris Hart (1/1)	(United States) Shirley Fry	6–3, 6–3
1952	(Hungary) Zsuzsa Körmöczy (2/6)	(Austria) Hella Strecker	7–5, 7–5
1953	(United States) Dottie Head Knode (1/1)	(West Germany) Totta Zehden	7–5, 10–12, 6–4
1954	(Italy) Silvana Lazzarino (1/1)	(France) Jacqueline Kermina	3–6, 6–2, 6–4
1955	(United Kingdom) Patricia Ward (1/1)	(United Kingdom) Shirley Bloomer	6–4, 6–2
1956	(United States) Althea Gibson (1/1)	(United Kingdom) Shirley Bloomer	6–4, 6–4
1957	(Italy) Annalisa Bellani (2/2)	(Mexico) Yola Ramírez	6–2, 6–1
1958	(Hungary) Zsuzsa Körmöczy (3/6)	(United States) Mimi Arnold	6–2, 6–3
1959	(Hungary) Zsuzsa Körmöczy (4/6)	(Mexico) Yola Ramírez	7–5, 1–6, 6–3
1960	(Hungary) Zsuzsa Körmöczy (5/6)	(Mexico) Yola Ramírez	6–3, 6–2
1961	(Australia) Margaret Smith (1/1)	(United Kingdom) Elizabeth Starkie	4–6, 6–1, 6–2
1962	(Hungary) Zsuzsa Körmöczy (6/6)	(France) Florence de la Courtie	6–3, 6–2
1963	(Australia) Lesley Turner (1/1)	(Australia) Jan Lehane	5–7, 8–6, 6–2
1964	(United Kingdom) Christine Truman (1/1)	(Australia) Jan Lehane	6–4, 3–6, 6–4
1965	(France) Françoise Dürr (1/1)	(West Germany) Helga Schultze	7–5, 6–3
1966	(West Germany) Helga Niessen (1/4)	(Italy) Lea Pericoli	7–5, 6–4
1967	(West Germany) Helga Schultze (1/1)	(Australia) Gail Sherriff	6–4, 6–2
1968	(Czechoslovakia) Vlasta Kodesova Vopickova (1/1)	(United States) Marilyn Aschner	6–4, 3–6, 6–3
↓ Open era ↓
1969	(United Kingdom) Ann Haydon-Jones (1/1)	(United Kingdom) Virginia Wade	6–2, 6–3
1970	(West Germany) Helga Niessen (2/4)	(Australia) Kerry Melville	6–4, 6–1
1971	(France) Gail Sherriff Chanfreau (1/3)	(Netherlands) Betty Stöve	6–4, 4–6, 6–4
1972	(Sweden) Ingrid Löfdahl Bentzer (1/1)	(West Germany) Helga Niessen Masthoff	7–5, 6–3
1973	(Uruguay) Fiorella Bonicelli (1/1)	(Czechoslovakia) Renáta Tomanová	6–4, 6–2
1974	(France) Gail Sherriff Chanfreau (2/3)	(West Germany) Heide Schildknecht Orth	6–5 ret.
1975	(France) Gail Sherriff Chanfreau (3/3)	(West Germany) Helga Niessen Masthoff	3–6, 7–5, 6–2
1976	(West Germany) Helga Niessen Masthoff (3/4)	(Uruguay) Fiorella Bonicelli	6–4, 6–2
1977	(Czechoslovakia) Regina Maršíková (1/1)	(Romania) Mariana Simionescu	6–2, 6–3
1978	(France) Brigitte Simon (1/2)	(France) Gail Sherriff Lovera	7–5, 6–1
1979	(West Germany) Helga Niessen Masthoff (4/4)	(Italy) Sabina Simmonds	6–3, 6–1
1980	(France) Brigitte Simon (2/2)	(Switzerland) Isabelle Villiger	4–6, 7–6, 6–1
1981	(West Germany) Sylvia Hanika (1/1)	(Czechoslovakia) Hana Mandlíková	2–6, 6–3, 5–6 ret.
1982	(Romania) Virginia Ruzici (1/1)	(United States) Bonnie Gadusek	6–2, 7–6

== Records ==
Source: The tennisbase

=== Men' singles ===
Most titles	(Spain) Rafael Nadal	11
Most finals	(Spain) Rafael Nadal	12
Most consecutive titles	(Spain) Rafael Nadal	8 (2005–2012)
Most consecutive finals	(Spain) Rafael Nadal	9 (2005–2013)
Most matches played	(Spain) Rafael Nadal	79
Most matches won	(Spain) Rafael Nadal	73
Most consecutive matches won	(Spain) Rafael Nadal	46
Most editions played	(Serbia) Novak Djokovic	18
Youngest champion	(Sweden) Mats Wilander	18y, 7m, 7d (1983)
Oldest champion	(United Kingdom) Gordon Francis Lowe	38y, 8m, 6d (1923)

Longest final
1936 (54 games)
(Nazi Germany) Gottfried von Cramm	4	4	7	6	7
(Nazi Germany) Henner Henkel	6	6	5	4	5

Shortest final
1899 (8 games)
(United Kingdom) Reginald Doherty	6	0
(Germany) Victor Voss	2	0^{r}

=== Doubles ===
Most wins – Team	(United States) Bob Bryan (United States) Mike Bryan	6
Most wins – Individual	(United States) Bob Bryan	6
Most wins – Individual	(United States) Mike Bryan	6

== Notes ==
Awards and achievements
Preceded by None; Miami	ATP Masters Series Tournament of the Year; 2001; 2007	Succeeded by Miami; Miami
