= Roquebrune-Cap-Martin =

Commune in Provence-Alpes-Côte d'Azur, France

Roquebrune-Cap-Martin Ròcabruna Caup Martin (Occitan)
- Commune
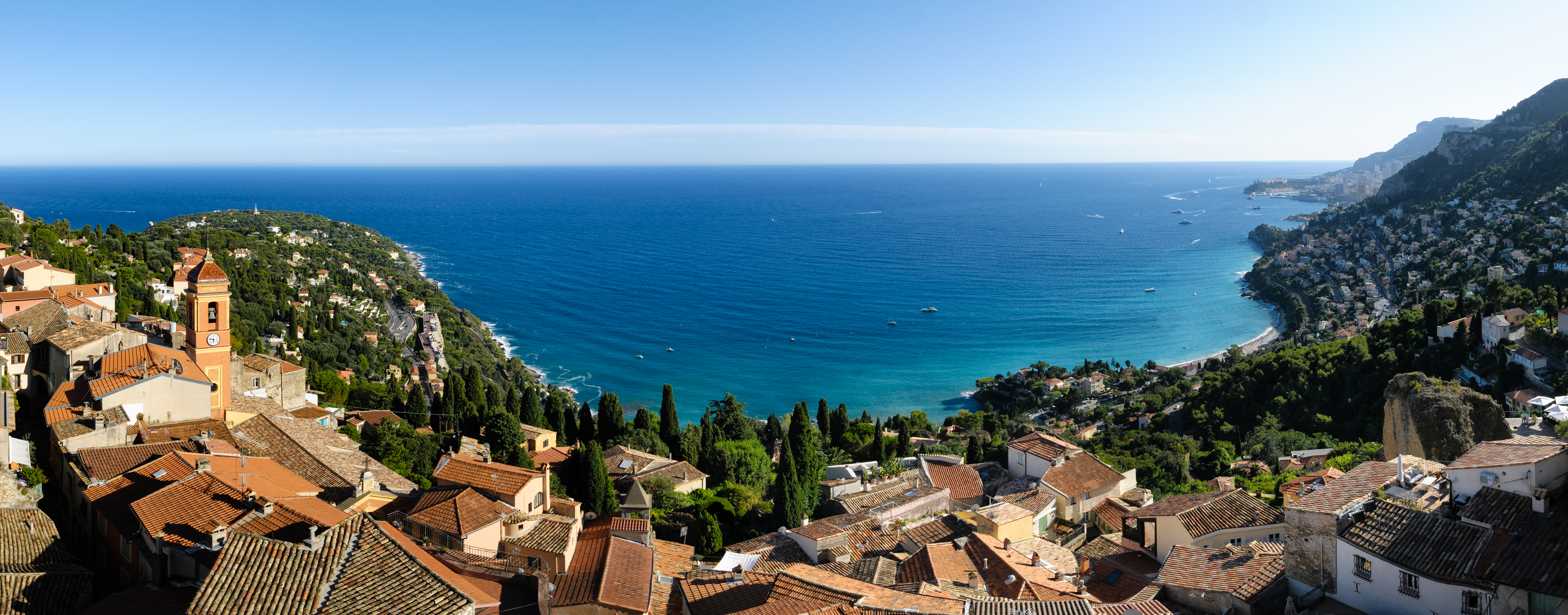
- A view of the old village, with the Cape and the Bay of Roquebrune

- Coat of arms
- Location of Roquebrune-Cap-Martin
- Location within France Location within Provence-Alpes-Côte d'Azur
- Coordinates: 43°45′46″N 7°27′47″E
- Country: France
- Region: Provence-Alpes-Côte d'Azur
- Department: Alpes-Maritimes
- Arrondissement: Nice
- Canton: Menton
- Intercommunality: CA Riviera Française

Government
  - Mayor (2026–32): Patrick Césari
- Area^{1}: 9.33 km^{2} (3.60 sq mi)
- Highest elevation: 800 m (2,600 ft)
- Lowest elevation: 0 m (0 ft)
- Population (2023): 12,037
  - Density: 1,290/km^{2} (3,340/sq mi)
- Demonym: Roquebrunois
- Time zone: UTC+01:00 (CET)
  - Summer (DST): UTC+02:00 (CEST)
- INSEE/Postal code: 06104 /06190
- ^{1} French Land Register data, which excludes lakes, ponds, glaciers > 1 km^{2} (0.386 sq mi or 247 acres) and river estuaries.

Roquebrune-Cap-Martin (French: [ʁɔk(ə)bʁyn kap maʁtɛ̃]; Occitan: Ròcabruna Caup Martin or Ròcabruna Cap Martin; Mentonasc: Rocabrüna; Italian: Roccabruna-Capo Martino [ˌrɔkkaˈbruːna ˈkaːpo marˈtiːno]), simply Roquebrune until 1921, is a commune in the Alpes-Maritimes department in the Provence-Alpes-Côte d'Azur region, Southeastern France, between Monaco and Menton. The name was changed from Roquebrune to differentiate the town from Roquebrune-sur-Argens in neighbouring Var.

== History ==
In pre-Roman times the area was settled by the Ligurians. Traces of their language can be still found in the local dialect. The commune (originally known as Roccabruna) was founded in 971 by Conrad I, Count of Ventimiglia, in order to protect his western border.

In 1355, Roccabruna fell under the control of the Grimaldi family of Monaco for five centuries, during which time the castle was strengthened.

In 1793, Roquebrune became French for the first time, changing the name from the original Roccabruna, but it was returned to Monaco in 1814. In 1804 Napoleon built a road along the coastline. This road connected the village to the rest of the Côte d'Azur, and eventually led to its merger with the smaller town of Cap-Martin.

In 1848, there was a revolution related to the Italian Risorgimento, with the result that Roccabruna and Menton became free cities under the protection of the Savoy Prince. The Free Cities of Menton and Roquebrune hoped to be part of the Italian kingdom of Sardinia, but this did not occur, and the towns after two years of independence were administered by the House of Savoy for ten years. They were finally ceded to France by a plebiscite in 1861.

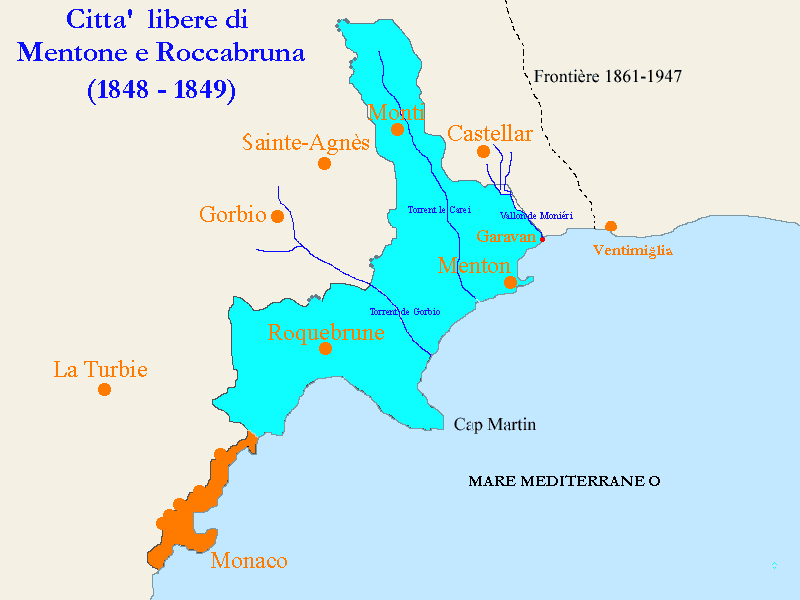
Marked in azure the territory of the Free Cities of Menton and Roquebrune, marked in orange the territory of the Principality of Monaco in 1848

Nice-born Giuseppe Garibaldi, who promoted the union of the County of Nice to Italy, complained that the plebiscite was not done with "universal vote" and consequently Roccabruna was requested by Italian irredentists. From the middle of the 19th century, with the construction of the Marseille–Ventimiglia railway line, this stretch of coast also became a magnet for personalities as a holiday home. Elisabeth of Austria spent several months of the last years of her life from 1894 to 1897 at the Hôtel du Cap Martin. Eugénie, widow of Napoleon III, owned a villa here. As a consequence of these irredentism ideals, during World War II all the coastal area between Italy and Monte Carlo was occupied and administered by the Kingdom of Italy until September 1943.

The area became fashionable in the 1920s and 1930s leading to the construction of buildings including Coco Chanel's La Pausa on Cap Martin, and Eileen Gray and Jean Badovici's E-1027.

The Irish poet and Nobel Laureate William Butler Yeats died in the Hôtel Idéal Séjour in the neighboring town of Menton on 28 January 1939. In a letter to his wife, Yeats expressed his wish to be buried in a cemetery in Roquebrune for one year and then to be exhumed and reburied in Drumcliff, County Sligo, Ireland. However, his exhumation was delayed until September 1948 at which point they could no longer locate his remains. According to one account, the French diplomat sent to oversee the reburial, Bernard Cailloux, said that it was "impossible to return the full and authentic remains of Mr Yeats" and proposed asking Dr Rebouillat, the local sworn pathologist, "to reconstitute a skeleton presenting all the characteristics of the deceased". The remains of several other individuals, including an Englishman named Alfred Hollis, were assembled in a coffin and sent to Ireland for reburial. The entire affair was handled with secrecy on both the part of the French delegation responsible for the burial, and the poet's family, so as not to elicit outrage from the Irish public. The incident was not publicly disclosed until the private archives of French diplomat Jacques Camílle Paris were turned over to the Irish Embassy in Paris in June 2015. The story was older than that, and was disputed by the family of the poet in a letter to The Irish Times in 1988.

The literary couple Romain Gary and Lesley Blanch lived in Roquebrune from 1950 to 1957. Le Corbusier built a cabanon, a minimalist architectural design. He drowned in the sea there on 27 August 1965 and was buried in the local cemetery.

== Today ==
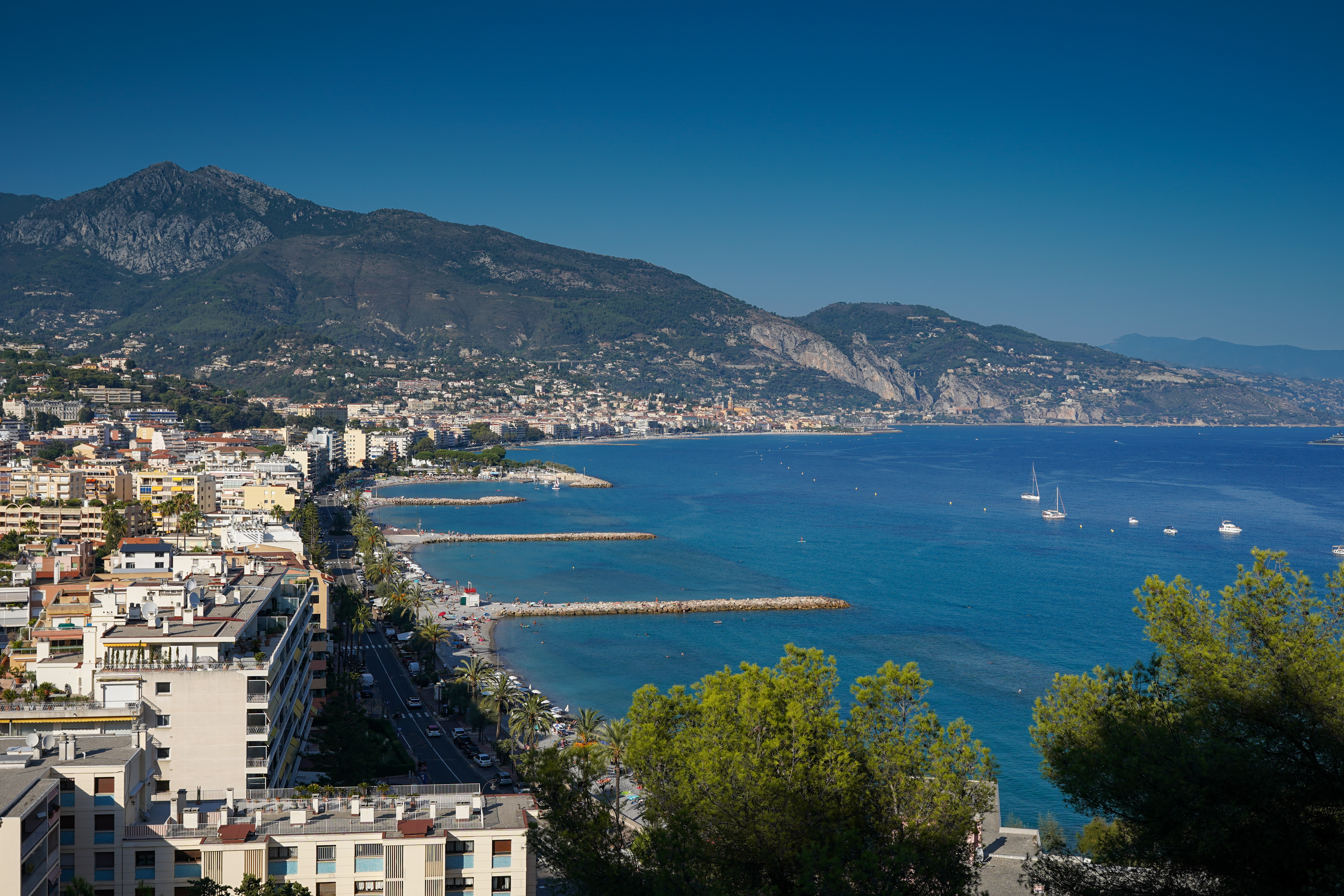
The seaside resort of Carnolès (near) and Menton (distant)

Roquebrune-Cap-Martin has several villages and towns: St. Roman, practically a suburb of Monaco (but not part of Monaco proper, as it does not lie within the borders of Monaco), the residential areas of Cabbé, Bon Voyage and Serret, Roquebrune with its perched village and château, the posh Cap Martin peninsula and the modern seaside resort of Carnolès, with its long pebble beach bordering Menton.

The whole area has a major tourism industry, particularly during the high season from April to October.

In Roquebrune-Cap-Martin, there is an millennial olive tree that would be the oldest tree in France.

== Demographics ==
Historical population

Year	Pop.	±% p.a.
1793	637	—
1806	644	+0.08%
1858	836	+0.50%
1872	828	−0.07%
1901	2,744	+4.22%
1926	6,462	+3.49%
1946	4,610	−1.67%
1962	6,529	+2.20%
1968	8,345	+4.17%

Year	Pop.	±% p.a.
1975	10,996	+4.02%
1982	12,450	+1.79%
1990	12,376	−0.07%
1999	11,692	−0.63%
2007	13,177	+1.51%
2012	12,641	−0.83%
2017	12,639	−0.00%
2023	12,037	−0.81%

Source: EHESS and INSEE (1968–2023)

== Culture ==
The local dialect actually is linguistically part of the Mentonasque of the País Mentonasc, a cultural area between the Ligurian dialects and the Occitan language.

Since 1861 the use of the French language has increased enormously in the city, and now only a minority of the 12,966 inhabitants still speak the original dialect of Roccabruna.

== Sport ==
Despite its name, the Monte Carlo Country Club is located in the commune and not in Monte Carlo, Monaco. It is the venue for the tennis Monte-Carlo Masters.

== International relations ==
Roquebrune-Cap-Martin is twinned with:

- Profondeville, Belgium
- Vejle, Denmark

== Honorary citizens ==
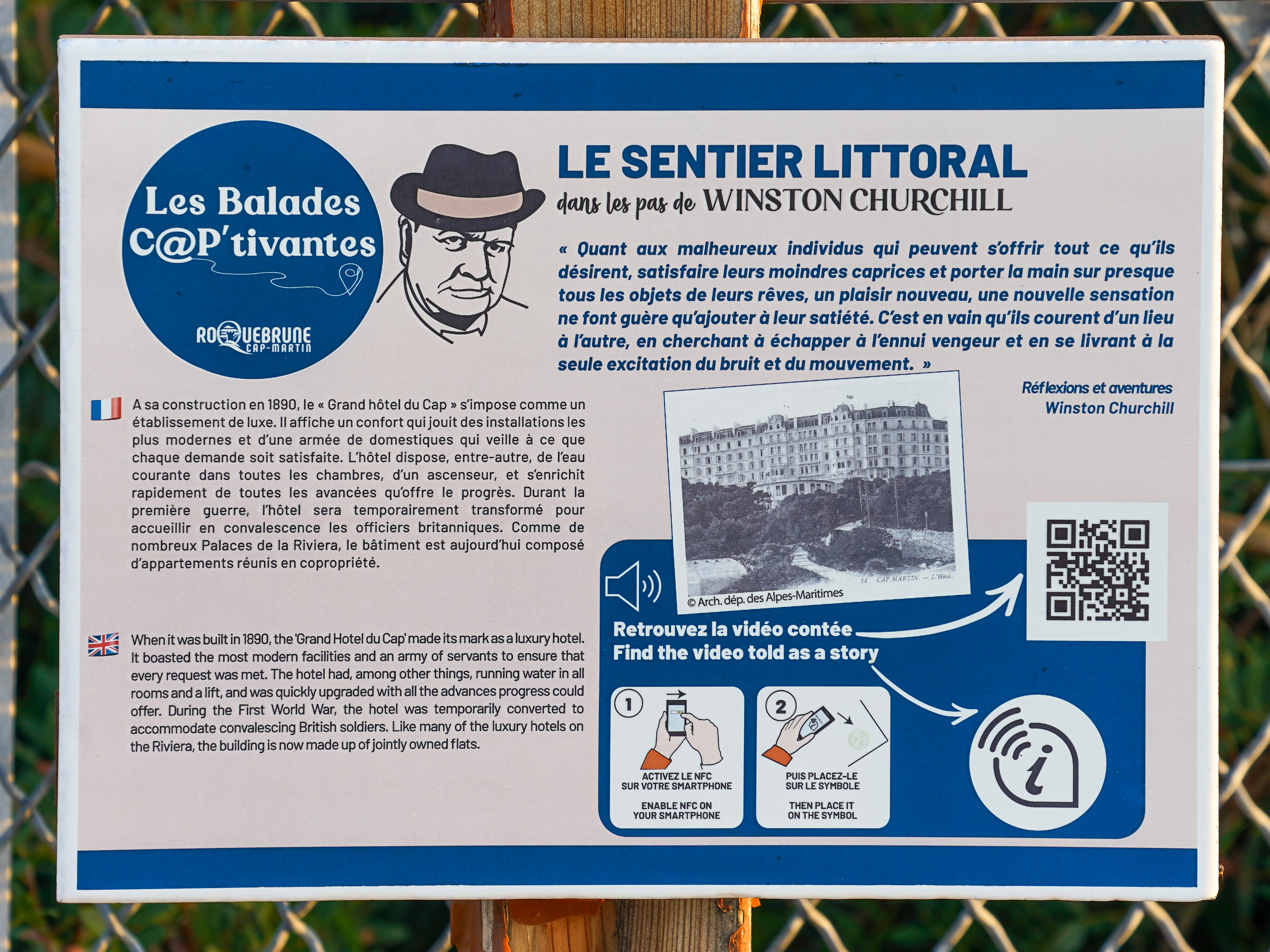
Sign board commemorating Sir Winston Churchill

People awarded the honorary citizenship of Roquebrune-Cap-Martin are:

Date	Name	Notes
3 March 1956	Rt. Hon. Sir Winston Churchill (1874-1965)	Prime Minister of the United Kingdom

== See also ==
- List of historical unrecognized states
- Former countries in Europe after 1815
- Grotte du Vallonnet
- Han van Meegeren, the well-known art-forger lived in Roquebrune and painted here his famous Vermeer fake Supper at Emmaus
