= Monte Carlo Country Club =

Tennis venue in the south of France

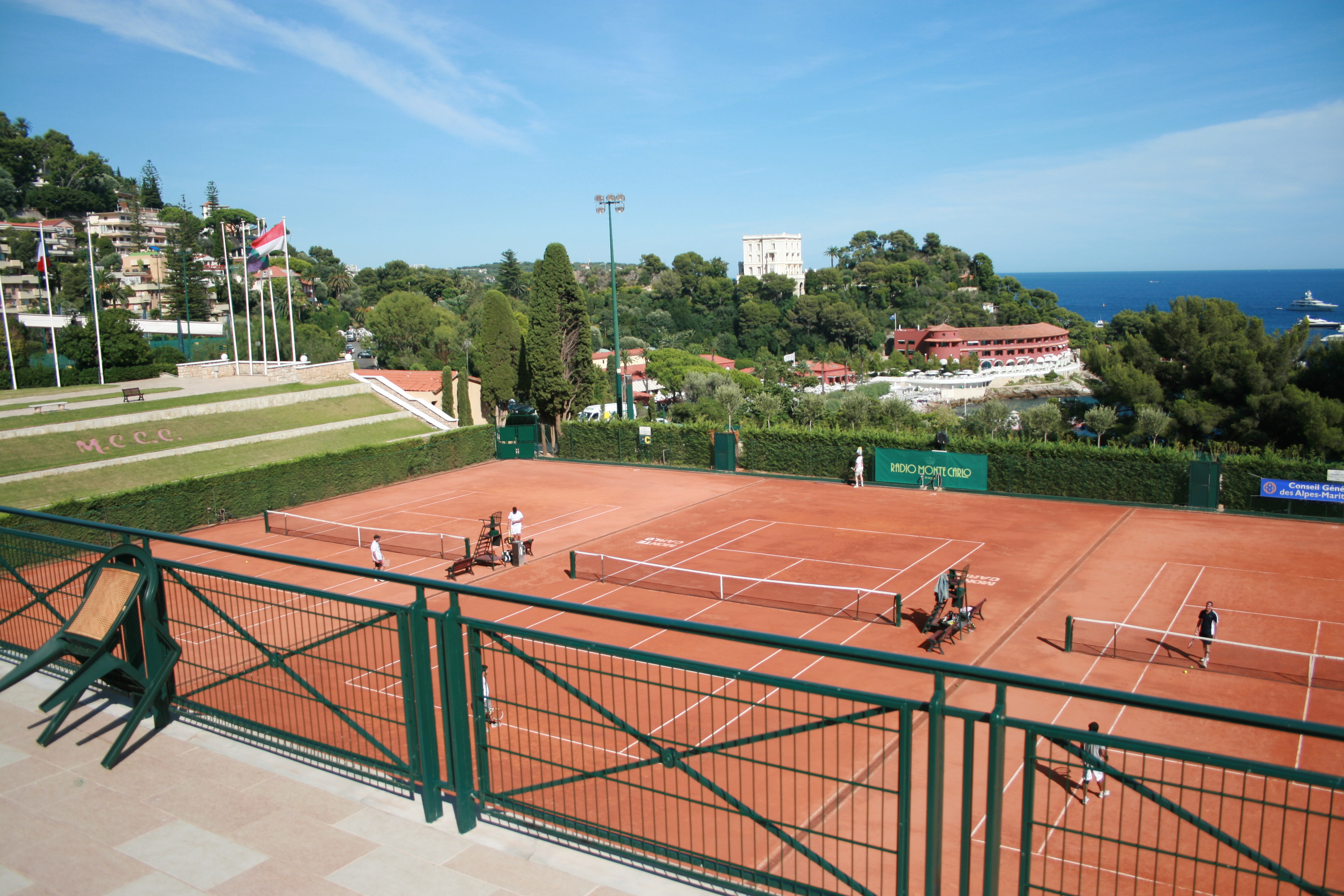
- Interactive map of Monte Carlo Country Club
- Location: Roquebrune-Cap-Martin, France
- Coordinates: 43.751667°N 7.440728°E
- Capacity: 10,000 (Tennis)
- Surface: clay

Construction
- Opened: 1928

Tenant
- Monte-Carlo Masters (Tennis) (present)

Monte Carlo Country Club (MCCC) is a tennis club in the commune of Roquebrune-Cap-Martin, Alpes-Maritimes, Provence-Alpes-Côte d'Azur, France. It is the home of the ATP Tour's Monte Carlo Masters tournament. It is also the base of the Monte Carlo Tennis Academy.

Despite the club's name, it is not located in Monte Carlo or even in Monaco, but just 150 meters outside Monaco's northeastern border.

== See also ==
- List of tennis stadiums by capacity
