= 1976 South American Championships – Singles =

Singles
- 1976 South American Championships
- 1975 Champion: (Argentina) Guillermo Vilas

Final
- Champion: (Argentina) Guillermo Vilas
- Runner-up: (Chile) Jaime Fillol
- Score: 6–2, 6–2, 6–3

Events
| Singles | Doubles |
| ← 1975 · | South American Championships | · 1977 → |

Guillermo Vilas was the defending champion and won in the final 6–2, 6–2, 6–3 against Jaime Fillol.

== Seeds ==
A champion seed is indicated in bold text while text in italics indicates the round in which that seed was eliminated.

1. (Argentina) **Guillermo Vilas (champion)**
2. (Chile) Jaime Fillol (final)
3. (Italy) Paolo Bertolucci (semifinals)
4. (Paraguay) Víctor Pecci (quarterfinals)
5. (Socialist Federal Republic of Yugoslavia) Željko Franulović (quarterfinals)
6. (United Kingdom) Mark Cox (second round)
7. (Spain) José Higueras (quarterfinals)
8. (Argentina) Ricardo Cano (quarterfinals)

== Draw ==
=== Key ===
- Q = Qualifier
- WC = Wild card
- LL = Lucky loser
- Alt = Alternate
- SE = Special exempt
- PR = Protected ranking
- ITF = ITF entry
- JE = Junior exempt
- w/o = Walkover
- r = Retired
- d = Defaulted
- SR = Special ranking
- NB: The final was the best of 5 sets while all other rounds were the best of 3 sets.

=== Final ===
| Final |
| 1 | (Argentina) **Guillermo Vilas** | **6** | **6** | **6** |
| 2 | (Chile) Jaime Fillol | 2 | 2 | 3 |

=== Section 1 ===
First round
1 | (Argentina) **G Vilas** | **6** | **6**
(Argentina) P Gorostiaga | 3 | 4
(Chile) **J Pinto-Bravo** | 4 | **6** | **6**
(Colombia) Á Betancur | **6** | 3 | 2
(Austria) **H Kary** | **6** | **6**
(Colombia) J Velasco, Sr. | 1 | 4
(United States) T Fontana | 1 | 1
7 | (Spain) **J Higueras** | **6** | **6**
3 | (Italy) **P Bertolucci** | 4 | **7** | **6**
(Brazil) C Kirmayr | **6** | 5 | 1
(Colombia) I Molina | **6** | 3 | 4
(Spain) **A Muñoz** | 2 | **6** | **6**
(Chile) P Rodríguez | **6** | 4 | 10
(Argentina) **L Álvarez** | 4 | **6** | **12**
(Chile) Á Fillol | 4 | 2
5 | (Socialist Federal Republic of Yugoslavia) **Ž Franulović** | **6** | **6**

Second round
1 | (Argentina) **G Vilas** | **6** | **6**
(Chile) J Pinto-Bravo | 1 | 3
(Austria) H Kary | 2 | 0
7 | (Spain) **J Higueras** | **6** | **6**
3 | (Italy) **P Bertolucci** | 3 | **6** | **6**
(Spain) A Muñoz | **6** | 2 | 0
(Argentina) L Álvarez | 3 | 1
5 | (Socialist Federal Republic of Yugoslavia) **Ž Franulović** | **6** | **6**

Quarterfinals
1 | (Argentina) **G Vilas** | **6** | **6**
7 | (Spain) J Higueras | 3 | 4
3 | (Italy) **P Bertolucci** | **6** | **7**
5 | (Socialist Federal Republic of Yugoslavia) Ž Franulović | 4 | 5

Semifinals
1 | (Argentina) **G Vilas** | 6 | **6** | **6**
3 | (Italy) P Bertolucci | **7** | 3 | 0

=== Section 2 ===
First round
6 | (United Kingdom) **M Cox** | 6 | **6** | **6**
(Brazil) J Soares | **7** | 1 | 2
(Bolivia) R Benavides | **7** | 2 | 1
(Brazil) **T Koch** | 6 | **6** | **6**
(Argentina) H Varela | 2 | **6** | 4
(Chile) **P Cornejo** | **6** | 3 | **6**
(Argentina) T Vázquez | 5 | 3
4 | (Paraguay) **V Pecci** | **7** | **6**
8 | (Argentina) **R Cano** | 4 | **6** | **6**
(Argentina) E Caviglia | **6** | 4 | 2
(Argentina) **J Ganzábal** | **7** | **6**
(Spain) E Mandarino | 6 | 2
(Chile) **B Prajoux** | **6** | **6**
(France) J Thamin | 3 | 1
(United States) N Holmes | **7** | 3 | 3
2 | (Chile) **J Fillol** | 5 | **6** | **6**

Second round
6 | (United Kingdom) M Cox | **6** | 4 | 6
(Brazil) **T Koch** | 3 | **6** | **8**
(Chile) P Cornejo | 2 | 0
4 | (Paraguay) **V Pecci** | **6** | **6**
8 | (Argentina) **R Cano** | **6** | **7**
(Argentina) J Ganzábal | 1 | 6
(Chile) B Prajoux | 3 | 4
2 | (Chile) **J Fillol** | **6** | **6**

Quarterfinals
(Brazil) **T Koch** | 3 | **6** | **6**
4 | (Paraguay) V Pecci | **6** | 3 | 4
8 | (Argentina) R Cano | 4 | **6** | 4
2 | (Chile) **J Fillol** | **6** | 4 | **6**

Semifinals
(Brazil) T Koch | 2 | 1
2 | (Chile) **J Fillol** | **6** | **6**
