= 1970 ATP Buenos Aires – Singles =

Singles
- 1970 ATP Buenos Aires

Final
- Champion: (Socialist Federal Republic of Yugoslavia) Željko Franulović
- Runner-up: (Spain) Manuel Orantes
- Score: 6–4, 6–2, 6–0

Events
Singles	Doubles
← 1969 ·	ATP Buenos Aires	· 1971 →

Željko Franulović defeated Manuel Orantes 6–4, 6–2, 6–0 to win the 1970 ATP Buenos Aires singles competition. François Jauffret was the champion but did not defend his title.

== Draw ==
=== Final ===
Final
(Socialist Federal Republic of Yugoslavia) Željko Franulović	6	6	6
(Spain) Manuel Orantes	4	2	0

=== Section 1 ===
First round
(Czechoslovakia) J Kodeš	6	6	6
(Argentina) H Varela	3	3	0
(Brazil) J Mandarino	6	6	6
1	0	3
(Australia) R Ruffels	6	6	6
(Mexico) R Cisneros	0	3	2
(Argentina) G Vilas	6	6	6
2	4	3
(Socialist Federal Republic of Yugoslavia) Z Franulović	6	6	6
1	2	4
(Mexico) J Loyo-Mayo	6	7	6
1	6	3
(Chile) J Fillol Sr.	6	6	5	6
(Spain) J Guerrero	3	2	7	2
(Czechoslovakia) J Kukal	4	6	6	6
(Argentina) R Aubone	6	3	3	1

Second round
(Czechoslovakia) J Kodeš	6	6	6
(Brazil) J Mandarino	1	2	1
(Australia) R Ruffels	6	6	6
(Argentina) G Vilas	3	1	3
(Socialist Federal Republic of Yugoslavia) Z Franulović	6	6	7
(Mexico) J Loyo-Mayo	4	2	6
(Chile) J Fillol Sr.	3	4	4
(Czechoslovakia) J Kukal	6	6	6

Quarterfinals
(Czechoslovakia) J Kodeš	6	6	0	6
(Australia) R Ruffels	3	3	0	1
(Socialist Federal Republic of Yugoslavia) Z Franulović	7	6	6
(Czechoslovakia) J Kukal	5	0	1

Semifinals
(Czechoslovakia) J Kodeš	2	2	2
(Socialist Federal Republic of Yugoslavia) Z Franulović	6	6	6

=== Section 2 ===
First round
(Argentina) J C Rodríguez	4	6	6	6
H Romani	6	1	2	2
(Spain) M Orantes	6	6	6
(Argentina) R Cano	0	0	1
(Chile) P Cornejo	7	7	6
5	5	4
(Australia) D Crealy	6	6	6
4	3	4
(Argentina) J Ganzábal	6	6	6
(Spain) N Romero	1	3	3
(Australia) B Carmichael	6	6	7
(Chile) J Pinto Bravo	3	0	5
(United States) F Froehling	6	6	6
(Australia) M Lynch	1	2	2
(United States) C Richey	6	6	7
(Argentina) O Escribano	1	2	5

Second round
(Argentina) J C Rodríguez	3	7	2	1
(Spain) M Orantes	6	5	6	6
(Chile) P Cornejo	3	2	2
(Australia) D Crealy	6	6	6
(Argentina) J Ganzábal	5	7	4	2
(Australia) B Carmichael	7	5	6	6
(United States) F Froehling	6	6	4	3
(United States) C Richey	7	4	6	6

Quarterfinals
(Spain) M Orantes	6	6
(Australia) D Crealy	4	1
(Australia) B Carmichael	7	4	6	6
(United States) C Richey	6	6	4	3

Semifinals
(Spain) M Orantes	5	6	6	6
(Australia) B Carmichael	7	1	0	4
