= 1971 Grand Prix (tennis) =

Tennis circuit

1971 Grand Prix circuit
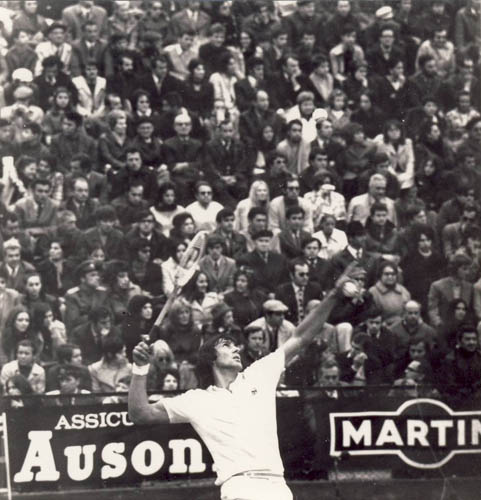
- Nastase playing in 1972 Davis Cup Final

Details
- Duration: 1 April 1971 – 26 December 1971
- Edition: 2nd
- Tournaments: 31
- Categories: Group A (3); Group B (11); Group C (11); Group D (5)

Achievements (singles)
- Most titles: (Romania) Ilie Năstase (4) (United States) Stan Smith (4)
- Most finals: (Romania) Ilie Năstase (6)
- Points leader: (United States) Stan Smith (187)

The 1971 Pepsi Cola Grand Prix was a professional tennis circuit held that year. It incorporated three of the four Grand Slam tournaments, (Note: The 1971 Australian Open was part of the World Championship Tennis (WCT) circuit.) the Grand Prix tournaments. It was the second edition of the Grand Prix circuit and was run by the International Lawn Tennis Federation (ITLF). In addition to regular tournament prize money a bonus prize money pool of £60,000 ($150,000) was available to be divided among the 20 highest ranking players after the last tournament. To be eligible for a share of the bonus pool a player had to compete in a minimum of nine tournaments. The circuit culminated in a Masters event in Paris for the seven highest point scoring players. Stan Smith was the winner of the circuit with 187 ranking points and four tournament victories.

== Schedule ==
Key

Group A tournaments
Group B tournaments
Group C tournaments
Group D tournaments
Grand Prix Masters
Team events

=== April ===
Week	Tournament	Champions	Runners-up	Semifinalists	Quarterfinalists
1 Apr	Nice International Championships; Nice, France; Group D Clay – $12,500 – 64S/32D	(Romania) Ilie Năstase; 10–8, 11–9, 6–1	(Czechoslovakia) Jan Kodeš	(Spain) Manuel Orantes (Czechoslovakia) František Pála	(France) François Jauffret (Hungary) Péter Szőke (Romania) Ion Țiriac (France) Pierre Barthès
1 Apr	Nice International Championships; Nice, France; Group D Clay – $12,500 – 64S/32D	(Romania) Ion Țiriac (Romania) Ilie Năstase; 6–3, 6–3	(France) Pierre Barthès (France) François Jauffret	(Spain) Manuel Orantes (Czechoslovakia) František Pála	(France) François Jauffret (Hungary) Péter Szőke (Romania) Ion Țiriac (France) Pierre Barthès
12 Apr	Monte Carlo Open; Roquebrune-Cap-Martin, France; Group C Clay – $20,000 – 32S/16D; Singles – Doubles	(Romania) Ilie Năstase; 3–6, 8–6, 6–1, 6–1	(Netherlands) Tom Okker	(United Kingdom) Roger Taylor (Romania) Ion Țiriac	(France) Pierre Barthès (Australia) Dick Crealy (France) Patrick Proisy (Socialist Federal Republic of Yugoslavia) Boro Jovanović
12 Apr	Monte Carlo Open; Roquebrune-Cap-Martin, France; Group C Clay – $20,000 – 32S/16D; Singles – Doubles	(Romania) Ion Țiriac (Romania) Ilie Năstase; 1–6, 6–3, 6–3, 8–6	(Netherlands) Tom Okker (United Kingdom) Roger Taylor	(United Kingdom) Roger Taylor (Romania) Ion Țiriac	(France) Pierre Barthès (Australia) Dick Crealy (France) Patrick Proisy (Socialist Federal Republic of Yugoslavia) Boro Jovanović
18 Apr	North Carolina National Bank Open; Charlotte, North Carolina, US; Group C Hard – 32S/16D	(United States) Arthur Ashe; 6–3, 6–3	(United States) Stan Smith	(United States) Cliff Richey (Australia) Tony Roche	(United States) Marty Riessen (United Kingdom) Mark Cox (United States) Charlie Pasarell (Socialist Federal Republic of Yugoslavia) Željko Franulović
18 Apr	North Carolina National Bank Open; Charlotte, North Carolina, US; Group C Hard – 32S/16D	(United States) Marty Riessen (Australia) Tony Roche; 6–2, 6–2	(United States) Arthur Ashe (United States) Dennis Ralston	(United States) Cliff Richey (Australia) Tony Roche	(United States) Marty Riessen (United Kingdom) Mark Cox (United States) Charlie Pasarell (Socialist Federal Republic of Yugoslavia) Željko Franulović
18 Apr	Campionati Internazionali di Sicilia; Palermo, Sicily, Italy; Group C Clay – $12,500 – 63S/16D	(United Kingdom) Roger Taylor; 6–3, 4–6, 7–6, 6–2	(France) Pierre Barthès	(Romania) Ion Țiriac (Australia) Barry Phillips-Moore	(Italy) Adriano Panatta (France) François Jauffret (France) Georges Goven (Romania) Ilie Năstase
18 Apr	Campionati Internazionali di Sicilia; Palermo, Sicily, Italy; Group C Clay – $12,500 – 63S/16D	(France) Georges Goven (France) Pierre Barthès; 6–2, 6–3	(Romania) Ilie Năstase (Romania) Ion Țiriac	(Romania) Ion Țiriac (Australia) Barry Phillips-Moore	(Italy) Adriano Panatta (France) François Jauffret (France) Georges Goven (Romania) Ilie Năstase
25 Apr	Catania International Open; Catania, Italy; Group C Clay – 64S/16D	(Czechoslovakia) Jan Kodeš; 6–3, 6–0, 6–2	(France) Georges Goven	(France) Pierre Barthès (France) Patrick Proisy	(Czechoslovakia) František Pála (Italy) Adriano Panatta (France) François Jauffret (France) Jean-Loup Rouyer
25 Apr	Catania International Open; Catania, Italy; Group C Clay – 64S/16D	(France) François Jauffret (France) Pierre Barthès; 6–4, 3–6, 6–3	(Czechoslovakia) Jan Kodeš (Czechoslovakia) Jan Kukal	(France) Pierre Barthès (France) Patrick Proisy	(Czechoslovakia) František Pála (Italy) Adriano Panatta (France) François Jauffret (France) Jean-Loup Rouyer
25 Apr	River Oaks International Tennis Tournament; Houston, Texas, US; Group C Hard – 32S/32D	(United States) Cliff Richey; 6–1, 6–2, 6–2	(United States) Clark Graebner	(Canada) Mike Belkin (Australia) Bob Carmichael	(United States) Frank Froehling (Australia) Dick Crealy (United States) Tom Gorman (United States) Harold Solomon
25 Apr	River Oaks International Tennis Tournament; Houston, Texas, US; Group C Hard – 32S/32D	(New Zealand) Onny Parun (Czechoslovakia) Milan Holeček; 1–6, 7–6, 6–4	(United States) Tom Edlefsen (United States) Frank Froehling	(Canada) Mike Belkin (Australia) Bob Carmichael	(United States) Frank Froehling (Australia) Dick Crealy (United States) Tom Gorman (United States) Harold Solomon

=== May ===
Week	Tournament	Champions	Runners-up	Semifinalists	Quarterfinalists
1 May	City of Paris Open Championships; Paris, France; Group C Clay – 32S/16D	(United States) Stan Smith; 6–2, 6–4, 7–5	(France) François Jauffret	(France) Michel Leclercq (France) Pierre Barthès	(Australia) Barry Phillips-Moore (France) Patrice Dominguez (Australia) Raymond Moore (France) Patrick Proisy
1 May	City of Paris Open Championships; Paris, France; Group C Clay – 32S/16D	(United States) Stan Smith (United States) Tom Gorman; 3–6, 7–5, 6–2	(France) Pierre Barthès (France) François Jauffret	(France) Michel Leclercq (France) Pierre Barthès	(Australia) Barry Phillips-Moore (France) Patrice Dominguez (Australia) Raymond Moore (France) Patrick Proisy
17 May	German Open Tennis Championships; Hamburg, West Germany; Group B Clay – $20,000 – 32S/16D	(Spain) Andrés Gimeno; 6–3, 6–2, 6–2	(Hungary) Péter Szőke	(Czechoslovakia) Vladimír Zedník (Czechoslovakia) Jan Kodeš	(West Germany) Christian Kuhnke (Spain) Manuel Orantes (Hungary) István Gulyás (Australia) John Alexander
17 May	German Open Tennis Championships; Hamburg, West Germany; Group B Clay – $20,000 – 32S/16D	(Spain) Andrés Gimeno (Australia) John Alexander; 6–4, 7–5, 7–9, 6–4	(Australia) Dick Crealy (Australia) Allan Stone	(Czechoslovakia) Vladimír Zedník (Czechoslovakia) Jan Kodeš	(West Germany) Christian Kuhnke (Spain) Manuel Orantes (Hungary) István Gulyás (Australia) John Alexander
22 May	British Hard Court Championships; Bournemouth, England; Group B Clay – $36,000 – 32S/16D	(United Kingdom) Gerald Battrick; 6–3, 6–2, 5–7, 6–0	(Socialist Federal Republic of Yugoslavia) Željko Franulović	(Chile) Jaime Fillol (United Kingdom) Mark Cox	(Australia) Frank Sedgman (France) Pierre Barthès (United Kingdom) Roger Taylor (South Africa) Robert Maud
22 May	British Hard Court Championships; Bournemouth, England; Group B Clay – $36,000 – 32S/16D	(Australia) Owen Davidson (Australia) Bill Bowrey; 8–6, 6–2, 3–6, 4–6, 6–3	(Chile) Patricio Cornejo (Chile) Jaime Fillol	(Chile) Jaime Fillol (United Kingdom) Mark Cox	(Australia) Frank Sedgman (France) Pierre Barthès (United Kingdom) Roger Taylor (South Africa) Robert Maud
22 May	Belgian Open Championships; Brussels, Belgium; Group B Clay – $25,000 – 32S/16D	(South Africa) Cliff Drysdale; 6–0, 6–1, 7–5	(Romania) Ilie Năstase	(Socialist Federal Republic of Yugoslavia) Boro Jovanović (Egypt) Ismail El Shafei	(Australia) Bob Carmichael (United States) Cliff Richey (United States) Stan Smith (Romania) Ion Țiriac
22 May	Belgian Open Championships; Brussels, Belgium; Group B Clay – $25,000 – 32S/16D	(United States) Marty Riessen (Netherlands) Tom Okker; Divided	(Romania) Ilie Năstase (Romania) Ion Țiriac	(Socialist Federal Republic of Yugoslavia) Boro Jovanović (Egypt) Ismail El Shafei	(Australia) Bob Carmichael (United States) Cliff Richey (United States) Stan Smith (Romania) Ion Țiriac
24 May	French Open; Paris, France; Clay – 128S/128D; Grand Slam / Group A	(Czechoslovakia) Jan Kodeš; 8–6, 6–2, 2–6, 7–5	(Romania) Ilie Năstase	(United States) Frank Froehling (Socialist Federal Republic of Yugoslavia) Željko Franulović	(United States) Arthur Ashe (United States) Stan Smith (Hungary) István Gulyás (France) Patrick Proisy
24 May	French Open; Paris, France; Clay – 128S/128D; Grand Slam / Group A	(United States) Arthur Ashe (United States) Marty Riessen; 6–8, 4–6, 6–3, 6–4, 11–9	(United States) Tom Gorman (United States) Stan Smith	(United States) Frank Froehling (Socialist Federal Republic of Yugoslavia) Željko Franulović	(United States) Arthur Ashe (United States) Stan Smith (Hungary) István Gulyás (France) Patrick Proisy
24 May	French Open; Paris, France; Clay – 128S/128D; Grand Slam / Group A	(France) Françoise Dürr (France) Jean-Claude Barclay; 6–2, 6–4	(United Kingdom) Winnie Shaw (Soviet Union) Toomas Leius	(United States) Frank Froehling (Socialist Federal Republic of Yugoslavia) Željko Franulović	(United States) Arthur Ashe (United States) Stan Smith (Hungary) István Gulyás (France) Patrick Proisy

=== June ===
Week	Tournament	Champions	Runners-up	Semifinalists	Quarterfinalists
14 Jun	Queen's Club Championships; London, England; Grass – 64S/32D; Group D Singles – Doubles	(United States) Stan Smith; 8–6, 6–3	(Australia) John Newcombe	(Australia) Owen Davidson (United States) Tom Gorman	(Australia) Ross Case (Australia) Roy Emerson (United States) Marty Riessen (Australia) Rod Laver
14 Jun	Queen's Club Championships; London, England; Grass – 64S/32D; Group D Singles – Doubles	(United States) Marty Riessen (Netherlands) Tom Okker; 8–6, 4–6, 10–8	(United States) Stan Smith (United States) Erik van Dillen	(Australia) Owen Davidson (United States) Tom Gorman	(Australia) Ross Case (Australia) Roy Emerson (United States) Marty Riessen (Australia) Rod Laver
21 Jun	Wimbledon; London, England; Grass– 128S/64D; Grand Slam / Group A Singles – Doubles – Mixed doubles	(Australia) John Newcombe; 6–3, 5–7, 2–6, 6–4, 6–4	(United States) Stan Smith	(United States) Tom Gorman (Australia) Ken Rosewall	(Australia) Rod Laver (New Zealand) Onny Parun (United States) Cliff Richey (Australia) Colin Dibley
21 Jun	Wimbledon; London, England; Grass– 128S/64D; Grand Slam / Group A Singles – Doubles – Mixed doubles	(Australia) Roy Emerson (Australia) Rod Laver; 4–6, 9–7, 6–8, 6–4, 6–4	(United States) Arthur Ashe (United States) Dennis Ralston	(United States) Tom Gorman (Australia) Ken Rosewall	(Australia) Rod Laver (New Zealand) Onny Parun (United States) Cliff Richey (Australia) Colin Dibley
21 Jun	Wimbledon; London, England; Grass– 128S/64D; Grand Slam / Group A Singles – Doubles – Mixed doubles	(United States) Billie Jean King (Australia) Owen Davidson; 3–6, 6–2, 15-13	(Australia) Margaret Court (United States) Marty Riessen	(United States) Tom Gorman (Australia) Ken Rosewall	(Australia) Rod Laver (New Zealand) Onny Parun (United States) Cliff Richey (Australia) Colin Dibley

=== July ===
Week	Tournament	Champions	Runners-up	Semifinalists	Quarterfinalists
5 Jul	Swedish Open; Båstad, Sweden; Clay – 32S/32D; Group B	(Romania) Ilie Năstase; 6–7, 6–2, 6–1, 6–4	(Denmark) Jan Leschly	(Australia) Ray Ruffels (Spain) Manuel Santana	(France) Patrick Proisy (Sweden) Per Jemsby (France) Pierre Barthès (United States) Stan Smith
5 Jul	Swedish Open; Båstad, Sweden; Clay – 32S/32D; Group B	(Romania) Ilie Năstase (Romania) Ion Țiriac; 7–6, 6–1	(Chile) Jaime Pinto Bravo (United States) Butch Seewagen	(Australia) Ray Ruffels (Spain) Manuel Santana	(France) Patrick Proisy (Sweden) Per Jemsby (France) Pierre Barthès (United States) Stan Smith
5 Jul	Swiss Open; Gstaad, Switzerland; Clay – $20,000 – 32S/16D; Group B	(Australia) John Newcombe; 6–2, 5–7, 1–6, 7–5, 6–3	(Netherlands) Tom Okker	(Australia) Roy Emerson (Egypt) Ismail El Shafei	(Australia) Phil Dent (South Africa) Robert Maud (Socialist Federal Republic of Yugoslavia) Nikola Pilić (United States) Jeff Borowiak
5 Jul	Swiss Open; Gstaad, Switzerland; Clay – $20,000 – 32S/16D; Group B	(Australia) Phil Dent (Australia) John Alexander; 5–7, 6–3, 6–4	(Australia) John Newcombe (Netherlands) Tom Okker	(Australia) Roy Emerson (Egypt) Ismail El Shafei	(Australia) Phil Dent (South Africa) Robert Maud (Socialist Federal Republic of Yugoslavia) Nikola Pilić (United States) Jeff Borowiak
5 Jul	Greenshields Welsh Open; Newport, Wales; Grass – 32S/16D; Group C	(Australia) Ken Rosewall; 6–1, 9–8	(United Kingdom) Roger Taylor	(United Kingdom) Gerald Battrick (France) Jean-Baptiste Chanfreau	(New Zealand) Onny Parun (France) Wanaro N'Godrella (United Kingdom) Stephen Warboys (Rhodesia) Andrew Pattison
5 Jul	Greenshields Welsh Open; Newport, Wales; Grass – 32S/16D; Group C	(United Kingdom) Roger Taylor (Australia) Ken Rosewall; 7–5, 3–6, 6–2	(United Kingdom) John Clifton (United Kingdom) John Paish	(United Kingdom) Gerald Battrick (France) Jean-Baptiste Chanfreau	(New Zealand) Onny Parun (France) Wanaro N'Godrella (United Kingdom) Stephen Warboys (Rhodesia) Andrew Pattison
12 Jul	Washington Star International (Note: Tournament was also part of the World Championship Tennis (WCT) circuit.); Washington, D.C., US; Clay – $50,000 – 64S/16D; Group B Singles – Doubles	(Australia) Ken Rosewall; 6–2, 7–5, 6–1	(United States) Marty Riessen	(United States) Stan Smith (Australia) John Newcombe	(United States) Dennis Ralston (Egypt) Ismail El Shafei (South Africa) Cliff Drysdale (Spain) Andrés Gimeno
12 Jul	Washington Star International; Washington, D.C., US; Clay – $50,000 – 64S/16D; Group B Singles – Doubles	(Netherlands) Tom Okker (United States) Marty Riessen; 7–6, 6–2	(Australia) Bob Carmichael (Australia) Ray Ruffels	(United States) Stan Smith (Australia) John Newcombe	(United States) Dennis Ralston (Egypt) Ismail El Shafei (South Africa) Cliff Drysdale (Spain) Andrés Gimeno
24 Jul	Tanglewood International Tennis Classic; Clemmons, North Carolina, US; Hard – 64S/16D; Group C	(Chile) Jaime Fillol; 4–6, 6–4, 7–6	(Socialist Federal Republic of Yugoslavia) Željko Franulović	(United States) Cliff Richey (Canada) Mike Belkin	(France) Pierre Barthès (United States) Harold Solomon (United States) Erik van Dillen (United States) Jimmy Connors
24 Jul	Tanglewood International Tennis Classic; Clemmons, North Carolina, US; Hard – 64S/16D; Group C	(United States) Jim McManus (United States) Jim Osborne; 6–2, 6–4	(United States) Jimmy Connors (United States) Jeff Austin	(United States) Cliff Richey (Canada) Mike Belkin	(France) Pierre Barthès (United States) Harold Solomon (United States) Erik van Dillen (United States) Jimmy Connors

=== August ===
Week	Tournament	Champions	Runners-up	Semifinalists	Quarterfinalists
1 Aug	Buckeye Open; Columbus, Ohio, US; Group D Hard – 32S/16D	(United States) Tom Gorman; 6–7, 7–6, 4–6, 7–6, 6–3	(United States) Jimmy Connors	(United States) Erik van Dillen (South Africa) Raymond Moore	(Socialist Federal Republic of Yugoslavia) Željko Franulović (Pakistan) Haroon Rahim (United States) Jim Osborne (France) Georges Goven
1 Aug	Buckeye Open; Columbus, Ohio, US; Group D Hard – 32S/16D	(United States) Jim Osborne (United States) Jim McManus; 4–6, 7–5, 6–2	(United States) Jimmy Connors (United States) Roscoe Tanner	(United States) Erik van Dillen (South Africa) Raymond Moore	(Socialist Federal Republic of Yugoslavia) Željko Franulović (Pakistan) Haroon Rahim (United States) Jim Osborne (France) Georges Goven
2 Aug	Cincinnati Open; Cincinnati, Ohio, US; Group C Clay – $30,000 – 64S/32D	(United States) Stan Smith; 7–6, 6–3	(Spain) Juan Gisbert	(United States) Erik van Dillen (France) Patrick Proisy	(United States) Harold Solomon (United States) Tom Gorman (Chile) Jaime Fillol (France) Georges Goven
2 Aug	Cincinnati Open; Cincinnati, Ohio, US; Group C Clay – $30,000 – 64S/32D	(United States) Erik van Dillen (United States) Stan Smith; 6–4, 6–4	(United States) Sandy Mayer (United States) Roscoe Tanner	(United States) Erik van Dillen (France) Patrick Proisy	(United States) Harold Solomon (United States) Tom Gorman (Chile) Jaime Fillol (France) Georges Goven
2 Aug	Senigallia Open; Italy; Group D Clay – 64S/32D	(Italy) Adriano Panatta; 6–3, 7–5, 6–1	(Australia) Martin Mulligan	(Czechoslovakia) František Pála (Italy) Paolo Bertolucci	(Indonesia) Atet Wijono (Italy) Sergio Palmieri (Italy) Ezio Di Matteo (Italy) Giordano Maioli
2 Aug	Senigallia Open; Italy; Group D Clay – 64S/32D	(Indonesia) Gondo Widjojo (Indonesia) Atet Wijono; 6–7, 7–5, 6–3	(Italy) Ezio Di Matteo (Italy) Antonio Zugarelli	(Czechoslovakia) František Pála (Italy) Paolo Bertolucci	(Indonesia) Atet Wijono (Italy) Sergio Palmieri (Italy) Ezio Di Matteo (Italy) Giordano Maioli
16 Aug	U.S. Men's Clay Court Championships; Indianapolis, Indiana, US; Group B Clay – $50,000 – 64S/32D	(Socialist Federal Republic of Yugoslavia) Željko Franulović; 6–3, 6–4, 0–6, 6–3	(United States) Cliff Richey	(Chile) Jaime Fillol (United States) Clark Graebner	(United States) Eddie Dibbs (France) Pierre Barthès (United States) Roscoe Tanner (Chile) Patricio Cornejo
16 Aug	U.S. Men's Clay Court Championships; Indianapolis, Indiana, US; Group B Clay – $50,000 – 64S/32D	(Czechoslovakia) Jan Kodeš (Socialist Federal Republic of Yugoslavia) Željko Franulović; 7–6, 5–7, 6–3	(United States) Clark Graebner (United States) Erik van Dillen	(Chile) Jaime Fillol (United States) Clark Graebner	(United States) Eddie Dibbs (France) Pierre Barthès (United States) Roscoe Tanner (Chile) Patricio Cornejo
22 Aug	Pennsylvania Championships; Merion, Haverford, Pennsylvania, US; Group D Hard – $15,000 – 64S/32D	(United States) Clark Graebner; 6–2, 6–4, 6–7, 7–5	(United States) Dick Stockton	(United States) Frank Froehling (Australia) Colin Dibley	(United States) Roscoe Tanner (Denmark) Jan Leschly (Czechoslovakia) Milan Holeček (United States) Herb Fitzgibbon
22 Aug	Pennsylvania Championships; Merion, Haverford, Pennsylvania, US; Group D Hard – $15,000 – 64S/32D	(United States) Jim Osborne (United States) Clark Graebner; 7–6, 6–3	(United States) Robert McKinley (United States) Dick Stockton	(United States) Frank Froehling (Australia) Colin Dibley	(United States) Roscoe Tanner (Denmark) Jan Leschly (Czechoslovakia) Milan Holeček (United States) Herb Fitzgibbon

=== September ===
Week	Tournament	Champions	Runners-up	Semifinalists	Quarterfinalists
1 Sep	US Open; Forest Hills, New York, US; Grand Slam / Group A Grass – $88,300 – 128S/64D; Singles – Doubles – Mixed doubles	(United States) Stan Smith; 3–6, 6–3, 6–2, 7–6	(Czechoslovakia) Jan Kodeš	(United States) Arthur Ashe (Netherlands) Tom Okker	(United States) Frank Froehling (Spain) Manuel Orantes (United States) Clark Graebner (United States) Marty Riessen
1 Sep	US Open; Forest Hills, New York, US; Grand Slam / Group A Grass – $88,300 – 128S/64D; Singles – Doubles – Mixed doubles	(Australia) John Newcombe (United Kingdom) Roger Taylor; 6–7, 6–3, 7–6, 4–6, 7–6	(United States) Stan Smith (United States) Erik van Dillen	(United States) Arthur Ashe (Netherlands) Tom Okker	(United States) Frank Froehling (Spain) Manuel Orantes (United States) Clark Graebner (United States) Marty Riessen
1 Sep	US Open; Forest Hills, New York, US; Grand Slam / Group A Grass – $88,300 – 128S/64D; Singles – Doubles – Mixed doubles	(United States) Billie Jean King (Australia) Owen Davidson; 6–3, 7–5	(Netherlands) Betty Stöve (South Africa) Robert Maud	(United States) Arthur Ashe (Netherlands) Tom Okker	(United States) Frank Froehling (Spain) Manuel Orantes (United States) Clark Graebner (United States) Marty Riessen
1 Sep	South Orange Open; South Orange, New Jersey, US; Group C Grass – $25,000 – 64S/32D	(United States) Clark Graebner; 6–3, 6–4, 6–4	(France) Pierre Barthès	(United States) Marty Riessen (New Zealand) Onny Parun	(United States) Roscoe Tanner (United States) Alejandro Olmedo (United States) Jimmy Connors (France) Patrick Proisy
1 Sep	South Orange Open; South Orange, New Jersey, US; Group C Grass – $25,000 – 64S/32D	(Australia) Tom Leonard (Australia) Bob Carmichael; 6–4, 4–6, 6–4	(United States) Clark Graebner (United States) Erik van Dillen	(United States) Marty Riessen (New Zealand) Onny Parun	(United States) Roscoe Tanner (United States) Alejandro Olmedo (United States) Jimmy Connors (France) Patrick Proisy
20 Sep	Pacific Southwest Open; Los Angeles, California, US; Group B Hard – $52,500 -64S/32D	(United States) Pancho Gonzales; 3–6, 6–3, 6–3	(United States) Jimmy Connors	(United States) Stan Smith (United States) Cliff Richey	(United States) Robert Lutz (Australia) Bob Carmichael (Australia) John Alexander (United States) Roscoe Tanner
20 Sep	Pacific Southwest Open; Los Angeles, California, US; Group B Hard – $52,500 -64S/32D	(Australia) Phil Dent (Australia) John Alexander; 7–6, 6–4	(United States) Clark Graebner (United States) Frank Froehling	(United States) Stan Smith (United States) Cliff Richey	(United States) Robert Lutz (Australia) Bob Carmichael (Australia) John Alexander (United States) Roscoe Tanner
20 Sep	Central California Hardcourt Championships; Sacramento, California, US; Group C Hard – 64S/32D	(United States) Robert Lutz; 3–6, 6–4, 6–3	(United States) Alejandro Olmedo	(France) Pierre Barthès (United Kingdom) Roger Taylor	(France) Georges Goven (United States) Frank Froehling (United States) Cliff Richey (Czechoslovakia) Jan Kodeš
20 Sep	Central California Hardcourt Championships; Sacramento, California, US; Group C Hard – 64S/32D	(United States) Jim Osborne (United States) Jim McManus; 7–6, 6–3	(South Africa) Frew McMillan (South Africa) Robert Maud	(France) Pierre Barthès (United Kingdom) Roger Taylor	(France) Georges Goven (United States) Frank Froehling (United States) Cliff Richey (Czechoslovakia) Jan Kodeš
27 Sep	Redwood Bank Pacific Coast Open; Berkeley, California, US; Group B Hard – $50,000 – 64S/32D; Singles – Doubles	(Australia) Rod Laver; 6–4, 6–4, 7–6	(Australia) Ken Rosewall	(Netherlands) Tom Okker (United States) Arthur Ashe	(United States) Robert Lutz (United States) Cliff Richey (United States) Marty Riessen (South Africa) Cliff Drysdale
27 Sep	Redwood Bank Pacific Coast Open; Berkeley, California, US; Group B Hard – $50,000 – 64S/32D; Singles – Doubles	(Australia) Rod Laver (Australia) Roy Emerson; 6–3, 6–3	(Australia) Ken Rosewall (Australia) Fred Stolle	(Netherlands) Tom Okker (United States) Arthur Ashe	(United States) Robert Lutz (United States) Cliff Richey (United States) Marty Riessen (South Africa) Cliff Drysdale

=== October ===
Week	Tournament	Champions	Runners-up	Semifinalists	Quarterfinalists
25 Oct	Embassy British Indoor Championships; London, England; Hard – $50,000 – 32S/16D; Group B	(Romania) Ilie Năstase; 3–6, 6–3, 3–6, 6–4, 6–4	(Australia) Rod Laver	(United States) Tom Gorman (South Africa) Bob Hewitt	(Australia) John Newcombe (South Africa) Frew McMillan (South Africa) Cliff Drysdale (Australia) Ray Ruffels
25 Oct	Embassy British Indoor Championships; London, England; Hard – $50,000 – 32S/16D; Group B	(South Africa) Bob Hewitt (South Africa) Frew McMillan; 7–5, 9–7, 6–2	(Australia) Bill Bowrey (Australia) Owen Davidson	(United States) Tom Gorman (South Africa) Bob Hewitt	(Australia) John Newcombe (South Africa) Frew McMillan (South Africa) Cliff Drysdale (Australia) Ray Ruffels

=== December ===
Week	Tournament	Champions	Runners-up	Semifinalists	Quarterfinalists
1 Dec	Buenos Aires Grand Prix; Buenos Aires, Argentina; Clay – 32S/16D; Group B Singles	(Socialist Federal Republic of Yugoslavia) Željko Franulović; 6–3, 6–4, 6–4	(Romania) Ilie Năstase	(Denmark) Jan Leschly (United States) Stan Smith	(Hungary) István Gulyás (United States) Cliff Richey (United States) Frank Froehling (Argentina) Roberto Aubone
1 Dec	Buenos Aires Grand Prix; Buenos Aires, Argentina; Clay – 32S/16D; Group B Singles	(Romania) Ilie Năstase (Socialist Federal Republic of Yugoslavia) Željko Franulović; 6–4, 6–4	(Chile) Patricio Cornejo (Chile) Jaime Fillol	(Denmark) Jan Leschly (United States) Stan Smith	(Hungary) István Gulyás (United States) Cliff Richey (United States) Frank Froehling (Argentina) Roberto Aubone
4 Dec	Pepsi–Cola Masters; Paris, France; Hard (i) – $48,000 – S7	(Romania) Ilie Năstase	N.A. (round robin)	N.A. (round robin)	N.A. (round robin)

== Standings ==
Player	Tournaments	Points	Prize Money
(United States) Stan Smith	14	187	$25,000
(Romania) Ilie Năstase	10	172	$17,000
(Socialist Federal Republic of Yugoslavia) Željko Franulović	16	129	$15,000
(Czechoslovakia) Jan Kodeš	14	124	$12,000
(United States) Cliff Richey	15	98	$10,500
(Australia) John Newcombe	7	94	$0 (Note: Played too few Grand Prix tournaments to qualify for bonus pool prize money.)
(France) Pierre Barthès	22	82	$9,500
(Australia) Ken Rosewall	6	82	$0
(United States) Clark Graebner	12	79	$4,200
(United States) Tom Gorman	16	69	$7,500

== Grand Prix rankings ==
As of 1 January 1971
Rank	Name	Nation
1 (3-way tie)	Rod Laver	(Australia)
1 (3-way tie)	Ken Rosewall	(Australia)
1 (3-way tie)	John Newcombe	(Australia)
4	Tony Roche	(Australia)
5	Arthur Ashe	(United States)
6	Cliff Richey	(United States)
7	Tom Okker	(Netherlands)
8	Roy Emerson	(Australia)
9	Ilie Năstase	(Romania)
10	Andrés Gimeno	(Spain)

Year-end rankings (December 1971)
Rank	Name	Nation	Change
1 (tie)	Stan Smith	(United States)	
1 (tie)	John Newcombe	(Australia)	=
3	Ken Rosewall	(Australia)	▼ –2
4	Rod Laver	(Australia)	▼ –3
5	Jan Kodeš	(Czechoslovakia)	
6	Tom Okker	(Netherlands)	▲ +1
7	Arthur Ashe	(United States)	▼ –2
8	Ilie Năstase	(Romania)	▲ +1
9	Cliff Drysdale	(South Africa)	
10	Marty Riessen	(United States)	

== List of tournament winners ==
The list of winners and number of singles titles won, listed alphabetically by last name:

- (United States) Arthur Ashe (2) Charlotte, Stockholm Open
- (United Kingdom) Gerald Battrick (2) Bournemouth, Hilversum
- (Australia) Bob Carmichael (1) Auckland
- (Australia) Phil Dent (1) Sydney Outdoor
- (South Africa) Cliff Drysdale (2) Miami WCT, Brussels
- (Chile) Jaime Fillol (1) Tanglewood
- (Socialist Federal Republic of Yugoslavia) Željko Franulović (4) New York, Macon, Indianapolis, Buenos Aires
- (Spain) Andrés Gimeno (1) Hamburg
- (United States) Pancho Gonzalez (1) Los Angeles
- (United States) Tom Gorman (1) Columbus
- (United States) Clark Graebner (3) Salisbury, Merion, South Orange
- (Brazil) Thomaz Koch (1) Caracas
- (Czechoslovakia) Jan Kodeš (2) Catania, French Open
- (Australia) Rod Laver (5) London, Rome, Fort Worth WCT, Berkeley, Bologna WCT
- (United States) Robert Lutz (1) Sacramento
- (Soviet Union) Alex Metreveli (1) Hobart
- (Romania) Ilie Năstase (6) Richmond, Hampton, Nice, Monte Carlo, Båstad, Masters
- (Australia) John Newcombe (6) Philadelphia, Chicago WCT, Dallas WCT, Wimbledon, Gstaad, Montreal
- (Netherlands) Tom Okker (2) Louisville WCT, Quebec WCT
- (Spain) Manuel Orantes (1) Barcelona WCT
- (United States) Cliff Richey (1) Houston
- (United States) Marty Riessen (1) Tehran WCT
- (Australia) Ken Rosewall (7) Australian Open, Newport, Washington WCT, Boston WCT, Vancouver WCT, Dallas, Australian Open
- (United States) Stan Smith (4) Paris, Queen's Club, Cincinnati, US Open
- (United Kingdom) Roger Taylor (1) Palermo

The following players won their first title in 1971:

- (United Kingdom) Gerald Battrick Bournemouth
- (Australia) Bob Carmichael Auckland
- (Australia) Phil Dent Sydney Outdoor
- (Chile) Jaime Fillol Tanglewood
- (Spain) Andrés Gimeno Hamburg
- (United States) Tom Gorman Columbus
- (United States) Clark Graebner Salisbury
- (United States) Robert Lutz Sacramento
- (Soviet Union) Alex Metreveli Hobart
- (United States) Marty Riessen Tehran
- (United Kingdom) Roger Taylor Palermo

== See also ==
- 1971 World Championship Tennis circuit
- 1971 USLTA Indoor Circuit
- 1971 Virginia Slims Circuit
