= 1973 South American Open – Singles =

Singles
- 1973 South American Open

Final
- Champion: (Argentina) Guillermo Vilas
- Runner-up: (Sweden) Björn Borg
- Score: 3–6, 6–7, 6–4, 6–6 ret.

Details
- Draw: 32

Events
Singles	Doubles
← 1972 ·	South American Open	· 1974 →

Guillermo Vilas defeated Björn Borg 3–6, 6–7, 6–4, 6–6 after Borg retired to win the 1973 ATP Buenos Aires singles competition. Karl Meiler was the champion but did not defend his title.

== Draw ==
- NB: All rounds up to but not including the semifinals were the best of 3 sets. The semifinals and final were the best of 5 sets.

=== Final ===
Final
(Sweden) Björn Borg	6	7	4	6	R
(Argentina) Guillermo Vilas	3	6	6	6

=== Section 1 ===
First round
(Sweden) B Borg	6	6
(Argentina) R Caviglia	0	2
(Argentina) R Cano	6	6
(Chile) A Cornejo	3	4
(Romania) I Țiriac	6	6
H Romani	4	0
(Chile) P Cornejo	6	6
(Paraguay) V Pecci	2	3
(Colombia) I Molina	6	6
(Greece) N Kalogeropoulos	1	3
(Argentina) J Ganzábal	7	6
(Chile) A Pierola	6	3
(Socialist Federal Republic of Yugoslavia) Z Franulović	6	6
(Argentina) C Gattiker	2	1
(Brazil) T Koch	6	6
(Argentina) F Dalla Fontana	1	2

Second round
(Sweden) B Borg	6	7
(Argentina) R Cano	4	6
(Romania) I Țiriac	6	6
(Chile) P Cornejo	1	4
(Colombia) I Molina	7	6
(Argentina) J Ganzábal	6	0
(Socialist Federal Republic of Yugoslavia) Z Franulović	6	6
(Brazil) T Koch	4	2

Quarterfinals
(Sweden) B Borg	6	3	6
(Romania) I Țiriac	1	6	3
(Colombia) I Molina	6	2	6
(Socialist Federal Republic of Yugoslavia) Z Franulović	4	6	3

Semifinals
(Sweden) B Borg	6	6	6
(Colombia) I Molina	2	3	2

=== Section 2 ===
First round
(Argentina) F Mastelli	6	2	4
(France) J-B Chanfreau	4	6	6
(Argentina) T Lynch	2	2
(Romania) T Ovici	6	6
(Ecuador) E Zuleta	2	0
(Austria) H Kary	6	6
(Argentina) R Gratz	5	6
(Argentina) G Vilas	7	7
(Argentina) H Varela	2	7	1
(Chile) J Pinto-Bravo	6	6	6
(Argentina) J Rivera	2	3
(Sweden) K Johansson	6	6
(Argentina) L Soriano	1	0
(Brazil) E Mandarino	6	6
(Argentina) T Quintin	2	3
(United States) E Dibbs	6	6

Second round
(France) J-B Chanfreau	1	6	2
(Romania) T Ovici	6	0	6
(Austria) H Kary	2	1
(Argentina) G Vilas	6	6
(Chile) J Pinto-Bravo	6	6
(Sweden) K Johansson	3	2
(Brazil) E Mandarino	3	4
(United States) E Dibbs	6	6

Quarterfinals
(Romania) T Ovici	4	3
(Argentina) G Vilas	6	6
(Chile) J Pinto-Bravo	1	2
(United States) E Dibbs	6	6

Semifinals
(Argentina) G Vilas	6	6	7
(United States) E Dibbs	4	1	6
