= 1974 South American Championships – Singles =

Singles
- 1974 South American Championships

Final
- Champion: (Argentina) Guillermo Vilas
- Runner-up: (Spain) Manuel Orantes
- Score: 6–3, 0–6, 7–5, 6–2

Details
- Draw: 32

Events
Singles	Doubles
← 1973 ·	South American Championships	· 1975 →

Guillermo Vilas was the defending champion and won in the final 6–3, 0–6, 7–5, 6–2 against Manuel Orantes.

== Draw ==
=== Key ===
- Q = Qualifier
- WC = Wild card
- LL = Lucky loser
- Alt = Alternate
- SE = Special exempt
- PR = Protected ranking
- ITF = ITF entry
- JE = Junior exempt
- w/o = Walkover
- r = Retired
- d = Defaulted
- SR = Special ranking
- NB: All rounds up to but not including the semifinals were the best of 3 sets. The semifinals and final were the best of 5 sets.

=== Final ===
Final
(Argentina) Guillermo Vilas	6	0	7	6
(Spain) Manuel Orantes	3	6	5	2

=== Section 1 ===
First round
(Argentina) G Vilas	6	6
(United States) R Fisher	1	4
(Australia) R Keldie	0	7	4
(Hungary) S Baranyi	6	6	6
(Austria) H Kary	6	2
(Bolivia) R Benavides	7	6
(United Kingdom) J Lloyd	3	1
(Argentina) T Vázquez	6	6
(United Kingdom) B Mottram	6	3	4
(Brazil) C Kirmayr	1	6	6
(Chile) B Prajoux	1	6	2
(Brazil) J Mandarino	6	1	6
(Chile) P Cornejo	6	6
(Argentina) H Varela	2	2
(Socialist Federal Republic of Yugoslavia) Ž Franulović	6	4	6
(Argentina) F Mastelli	4	6	2

Second round
(Argentina) G Vilas	6	6
(Hungary) S Baranyi	1	4
(Bolivia) R Benavides	6	6
(Argentina) T Vázquez	2	4
(Brazil) C Kirmayr	3	3
(Brazil) J Mandarino	6	6
(Chile) P Cornejo	1	5
(Socialist Federal Republic of Yugoslavia) Ž Franulović	6	7

Quarterfinals
(Argentina) G Vilas	6	6
(Bolivia) R Benavides	2	4
(Brazil) J Mandarino	6	2	6
(Socialist Federal Republic of Yugoslavia) Ž Franulović	4	6	4

Semifinals
(Argentina) G Vilas	6	6	6
(Brazil) J Mandarino	1	3	4

=== Section 2 ===
First round
(Chile) J Fillol	6	6
(Mexico) L Baraldi	1	3
(Chile) P Rodríguez	6	3	5
(Argentina) R Cano	4	6	7
(Colombia) I Molina	4	6	6
6	4	4
(Argentina) J Ganzábal	6	6
(Argentina) G Aubone	4	2
(Colombia) J Velasco Sr.	1	6	0
(Paraguay) V Pecci	6	3	6
(Rhodesia) R Dowdeswell	2	6	1
6	2	6
(Chile) J Pinto Bravo	6	1
(Hungary) P Szőke	7	6
(Argentina) R Aubone	2	0
(Spain) M Orantes	6	6

Second round
(Chile) J Fillol	6	0
(Argentina) R Cano	7	6
(Colombia) I Molina	6	6
(Argentina) J Ganzábal	3	3
(Paraguay) V Pecci	6	6
2	3
(Hungary) P Szőke	4	2
(Spain) M Orantes	6	6

Quarterfinals
(Argentina) R Cano	4	4
(Colombia) I Molina	6	6
(Paraguay) V Pecci	2	4
(Spain) M Orantes	6	6

Semifinals
(Colombia) I Molina	1	1	3
(Spain) M Orantes	6	6	6
