= 1971 South American Open – Men's singles =

Men's singles
- 1971 South American Open

Final
- Champion: (Socialist Federal Republic of Yugoslavia) Željko Franulović
- Runner-up: (Romania) Ilie Năstase
- Score: 6–3, 7–6, 6–1

Events
Singles	men	women
Doubles	men	women
← 1970 ·	South American Open	· 1972 →

Željko Franulović defeated Ilie Năstase 6–3, 7–6, 6–1 to win the 1971 South American Open singles competition. Franulović was the defending champion.

== Draw ==
=== Final ===
Final
(Romania) Ilie Năstase	3	6	1
(Socialist Federal Republic of Yugoslavia) Željko Franulović	6	7	6

=== Section 1 ===
First round
(Romania) I Năstase	6	6	6
(Argentina) O Escribano	2	4	4
(Czechoslovakia) M Holeček	6	7	6
(Chile) P Cornejo	3	5	3
(United States) T Gorman	6	6	6
(Argentina) R Graetz	3	3	1
(Hungary) I Gulyás	6	6	6
(Ecuador) E Zuleta	1	0	3
(United States) C Graebner	6	6	6
(Argentina) N Herrero	2	1	3
(Denmark) J Leschly	2	6	4	6	6
(Argentina) T Vázquez	6	4	6	3	3
(United States) C Richey	6	6	6
(Argentina) R Cano	0	2	4
(Argentina) G Vilas

Second round
(Romania) I Năstase	3	7	6	6
(Czechoslovakia) M Holeček	6	6	3	0
(United States) T Gorman	6	2	0	2
(Hungary) I Gulyás	2	6	6	6
(United States) C Graebner	1	3	6	1
(Denmark) J Leschly	6	6	1	6
(United States) C Richey	3	6	4	7	6
(Argentina) G Vilas	6	4	6	6	2

Quarterfinals
(Romania) I Năstase	6	6	6
(Hungary) I Gulyás	3	3	4
(Denmark) J Leschly	6	4	6	6
(United States) C Richey	1	6	3	2

Semifinals
(Romania) I Năstase	6	7	6
(Denmark) J Leschly	1	5	3

=== Section 2 ===
First round
(Socialist Federal Republic of Yugoslavia) Z Franulović	6	6	6	6
(Italy) G Romani	7	3	2	4
(Argentina) J Ganzábal	6	6	6
(Argentina) E Soriano	4	2	2
(United States) F Froehling	7	6	6
(Argentina) L Álvarez	6	4	2
(Chile) J Pinto Bravo	6	6	6
(Brazil) T Koch	1	4	3
(Argentina) R Aubone	6	7	6
(Chile) J Fillol Sr.	2	6	4
(Australia) M Lynch
(Mexico) J Loyo-Mayo	7	6	6
(Chile) P Rodríguez	5	2	3
(Argentina) R Aubone	2	0	1
(United States) S Smith	6	6	6

Second round
(Socialist Federal Republic of Yugoslavia) Z Franulović	6	6	6
(Argentina) J Ganzábal	2	4	1
(United States) F Froehling	7	7	7
(Chile) J Pinto Bravo	6	5	5
(Argentina) R Aubone	4	0	7	6	7
(United States) M Lynch	6	6	5	3	5
(Mexico) J Loyo-Mayo	1	2	6	3
(United States) S Smith	6	6	2	6

Quarterfinals
(Socialist Federal Republic of Yugoslavia) Z Franulović	6	7	7	6
(United States) F Froehling	7	6	6	4
(Argentina) R Aubone	2	4	4
(United States) S Smith	6	6	6

Semifinals
(Socialist Federal Republic of Yugoslavia) Z Franulović	2	7	6	6
(United States) S Smith	6	6	1	3
