= 1978 South American Championships – Singles =

Singles
- 1978 South American Championships
- 1977 Champion: (Argentina) Guillermo Vilas

Final
- Champion: (Argentina) José Luis Clerc
- Runner-up: (Paraguay) Víctor Pecci
- Score: 6–4, 6–4

Details
- Draw: 32
- Seeds: 8

Events
Singles	Doubles
- South American Championships

Guillermo Vilas was the defending champion but did not compete that year.

José Luis Clerc won in the final 6–4, 6–4 against Víctor Pecci.

== Seeds ==
A champion seed is indicated in bold text while text in italics indicates the round in which that seed was eliminated.

1. (Italy) Corrado Barazzutti (semifinals)
2. (United States) Harold Solomon (semifinals)
3. (Spain) José Higueras (quarterfinals)
4. (Argentina) **José Luis Clerc (champion)**
5. (Chile) Hans Gildemeister (first round)
6. (Italy) Paolo Bertolucci (second round)
7. (Chile) Jaime Fillol (first round)
8. (New Zealand) Chris Lewis (quarterfinals)

== Draw ==
Key

- Q = Qualifier
- WC = Wild card
- LL = Lucky loser
- Alt = Alternate
- ITF = ITF entry
- PR = Protected ranking
- SR = Special ranking
- SE = Special exempt
- JE = Junior exempt
- JR = Junior Accelerator Programme entrant
- CO = College Accelerator Programme entrant
- NG = Next Gen Accelerator Program entrant
- w/o = Walkover
- r = Retired
- d = Defaulted

First round
1	(Italy) **C Barazzutti**	**6**	**6**
(Chile) B Prajoux	4	0
(Chile) P Cornejo	3	**6**	2
(Argentina) **H Varela**	**6**	1	**6**
(Spain) A Muñoz	4	**6**	1
(Brazil) **C Kirmayr**	**6**	1	**6**
(West Germany) **R Gehring**	**6**	2	**6**
7	(Chile) J Fillol	3	**6**	2
3	(Spain) **J Higueras**	**6**	**6**
(Australia) P McNamee	1	2
(Colombia) I Molina	**6**	6	4
(Rhodesia) **A Pattison**	4	**7**	**6**
(Uruguay) **J L Damiani**	2	**6**	**6**
(France) P Dominguez	**6**	2	1
(Paraguay) **V Pecci**	**6**	**6**
5	(Chile) H Gildemeister	0	2
6	(Italy) **P Bertolucci**	**6**	**6**
(Argentina) F Dalla Fontana	4	2
(West Germany) A Maurer	**6**	5	6
(Ecuador) **R Ycaza**	4	**7**	**8**
(West Germany) **W Zirngibl**	**6**	**7**
(Brazil) G Barbosa	3	5
(Argentina) R Cano	1	2
4	(Argentina) **J L Clerc**	**6**	**6**
8	(New Zealand) **C Lewis**	**6**	**6**
(United States) G Hardie	2	2
(Venezuela) **J Andrew**	4	**7**	**6**
(Argentina) L Álvarez	**6**	5	1
(Brazil) **J Soares**	**6**	3	**9**
(Australia) P Kronk	2	**6**	7
(United States) V Winitsky	**6**	4	4
2	(United States) **H Solomon**	2	**6**	**6**

Second round
1	(Italy) **C Barazzutti**	**6**	**6**
(Argentina) H Varela	4	4
(Brazil) **C Kirmayr**	**7**	**6**
(West Germany) R Gehring	6	3
3	(Spain) **J Higueras**	**6**	**6**
(Rhodesia) A Pattison	4	2
(Uruguay) J L Damiani	3	**6**	1
(Paraguay) **V Pecci**	**6**	1	**6**
6	(Italy) P Bertolucci	**6**	2	6
(Ecuador) **R Ycaza**	4	**6**	**8**
(West Germany) W Zirngibl	1	1
4	(Argentina) **J L Clerc**	**6**	**6**
8	(New Zealand) **C Lewis**	5	**6**	**6**
(Venezuela) J Andrew	**7**	0	2
(Brazil) J Soares	4	2
2	(United States) **H Solomon**	**6**	**6**

Quarterfinals
1	(Italy) **C Barazzutti**	**6**	6	**6**
(Brazil) C Kirmayr	4	**7**	3
3	(Spain) J Higueras
(Paraguay) **V Pecci**	**w/o**
(Ecuador) R Ycaza	3	3
4	(Argentina) **J L Clerc**	**6**	**6**
8	(New Zealand) C Lewis	3	2
2	(United States) **H Solomon**	**6**	**6**

Semifinals
1	(Italy) C Barazzutti	4	4
(Paraguay) **V Pecci**	**6**	**6**
4	(Argentina) **J L Clerc**	**6**	1	**6**
2	(United States) H Solomon	2	**6**	2

Final
(Paraguay) Víctor Pecci	4	4
4	(Argentina) **José Luis Clerc**	**6**	**6**
