= 1969 South American Open – Men's singles =

Men's singles
- 1969 Buenos Aires tennis tournament

Final
- Champion: (France) François Jauffret
- Runner-up: (Socialist Federal Republic of Yugoslavia) Željko Franulović
- Score: 3–6, 6–2, 6–4, 6–3

Events
Singles	Doubles
- Buenos Aires tennis tournament

François Jauffret defeated Željko Franulović 3-6, 6-2, 6-4, 6-3 to win the 1969 Buenos Aires tennis tournament singles competition. Roy Emerson was the defending champion.

== Draw ==
=== Final ===
Final
(France) François Jauffret	3	6	6	6
(Socialist Federal Republic of Yugoslavia) Željko Franulović	6	2	4	3

=== Section 1 ===
First round
(Australia) R Emerson
(Chile) J Pinto-Bravo	6	6	6
1	3	4
(West Germany) I Buding	6	6	6
(Chile) P Apey	2	2	3
(Spain) E Mandarino	6	8	6
3	6	2
(Chile) J Fillol Sr.	6	6	6
2	2	2
(Czechoslovakia) J Kodeš	6	6	6
H Romani	2	2	1
(France) F Jauffret	6	7	6
(Argentina) E Soriano	1	5	1
(Argentina) J Ganzábal	6	8	6
(Argentina) L Álvarez	1	6	4

Second round
(Australia) R Emerson	2	6	6	6
(Chile) J Pinto-Bravo	6	2	2	4
(West Germany) I Buding	7	6	6
(Spain) E Mandarino	5	3	2
(Chile) J Fillol Sr.	6	6	5	4
(Czechoslovakia) J Kodeš	4	8	7	6
(France) F Jauffret	6	6	6
(Argentina) J Ganzábal	4	3	2

Quarterfinals
(Australia) R Emerson	5	6	6	6
(West Germany) I Buding	7	1	4	4
(Czechoslovakia) J Kodeš	5	0	10
(France) F Jauffret	7	6	12

Semifinals
(Australia) R Emerson	2	3	4
(France) F Jauffret	6	6	6

=== Section 2 ===
First round
(Argentina) G Vilas	7	6	6
(South Africa) F McMillan	5	1	2
(Chile) P Cornejo	6	4	6	6
4	6	4	3
(Greece) N Kalogeropoulos	6	3	6	6
3	6	1	3
(Socialist Federal Republic of Yugoslavia) Z Franulović	9	10	7
7	8	5
(Argentina) A Molina	4	6	5	6	6
(Argentina) J C Rodríguez	6	1	7	4	3
(Czechoslovakia) M Holeček	6	6	6
(Chile) L Ayala	1	2	2
(Colombia) J Velasco, Sr.	3	5	4
(Argentina) T Lynch	6	7	3
(United States) C Richey	6	6	6
0	2	0

Second round
(Argentina) G Vilas	6	4	4	6	6
(Chile) P Cornejo	1	6	6	4	4
(Greece) N Kalogeropoulos	1	2	1
(Socialist Federal Republic of Yugoslavia) Z Franulović	6	6	6
(Argentina) A Molina	7	1	6	11	6
(Czechoslovakia) M Holeček	9	6	3	9	2
(Colombia) J Velasco, Sr.	2	6	3	3
(United States) C Richey	6	2	6	6

Quarterfinals
(Argentina) G Vilas	4	1	2
(Socialist Federal Republic of Yugoslavia) Z Franulović	6	6	6
(Argentina) A Molina	2	4	2
(United States) C Richey	6	6	6

Semifinals
(Socialist Federal Republic of Yugoslavia) Z Franulović	6	7	6
(United States) C Richey	3	5	0
