= 1968 South American Open =

- Date: 4–10 November
- Edition: 26th
- Surface: Clay / outdoor
- Location: Buenos Aires, Argentina
- Venue: Buenos Aires Lawn Tennis Club

Champions

Men's singles
- (Australia) Roy Emerson

Women's singles
- (United Kingdom) Ann Jones

Men's doubles
- (Spain) Andrés Gimeno / (Australia) Fred Stolle

Women's doubles
- (United States) Rosie Casals / (United Kingdom) Ann Jones

Mixed doubles
- (United States) Julie Heldman / (United States) Herb Fitzgibbon
- South American Open

The 1968 South American Open was a combined men's and women's tennis tournament played on outdoor clay courts at the Buenos Aires Lawn Tennis Club in Buenos Aires in Argentina. It was the first open edition of the tournament and was held from 4 November through 11 November 1968. Roy Emerson and Ann Jones won the singles titles.

== Finals ==
=== Men's singles ===
(Australia) Roy Emerson defeated (Australia) Rod Laver 9–7, 6–4, 6–4

- It was Emerson's 2nd professional title of the year and the 2nd of his professional career.

=== Women's singles ===
(United Kingdom) Ann Jones defeated (United States) Nancy Richey walkover

=== Men's doubles ===
(Spain) Andrés Gimeno / (Australia) Fred Stolle defeated (Australia) Rod Laver / (Australia) Roy Emerson 6–3, 4–6, 7–5, 6–1

=== Women's doubles ===
(United States) Rosie Casals / (United Kingdom) Ann Jones defeated (United States) Julie Heldman / (Argentina) Mabel Vrancovich 6–1, 6–2

=== Mixed doubles ===
(United States) Julie Heldman / (United States) Herb Fitzgibbon defeated (Brazil) Edison Mandarino / (Argentina) Norma Baylon 6–3, 6–4
