= 1970 South American Open Championships =

1970 South American Open
- Date: 31 October – 8 November
- Edition: 3rd
- Category: Grand Prix
- Draw: 32S / 32D
- Surface: Clay / outdoor
- Location: Buenos Aires, Argentina

Champions

Singles
- (Socialist Federal Republic of Yugoslavia) Željko Franulović

Doubles
- (Australia) Bob Carmichael / (Australia) Ray Ruffels
← 1969 ·	South American Open Championships	· 1971 →

The 1970 South American Open Championships was a men's tennis tournament that was part of the 1970 Pepsi-Cola Grand Prix and held in Buenos Aires, Argentina. It was the third edition of the tournament held in Buenos Aires (they have also been held in Chile and Ecuador) and ran from 31 October through 8 November 1970. It was played on outdoor clay courts. Željko Franulović won the singles title.

== Finals ==
=== Singles ===
(Socialist Federal Republic of Yugoslavia) Željko Franulović defeated (Spain) Manuel Orantes 6–4, 6–2, 6–0

- It was Franulovic's 3rd ATP title of the year and the 4th of his ATP career.

=== Doubles ===
(Australia) Bob Carmichael / (Australia) Ray Ruffels defeated (Socialist Federal Republic of Yugoslavia) Željko Franulović / (Czechoslovakia) Jan Kodeš 7–5, 6–2, 5–7, 6–7, 6–3

- It was Carmichael's only ATP title of the year and the 1st of his ATP career. It was Ruffels's 3rd ATP title of the year and the 3rd of his ATP career.
