= 1975 South American Open =

- Date: 10–16 November
- Edition: 8th
- Category: Grand Prix (Grade A)
- Draw: 32S / 32D
- Prize money: $50,000
- Surface: Clay / outdoor
- Location: Buenos Aires, Argentina

Champions

Singles
- (Argentina) Guillermo Vilas

Doubles
- (Italy) Paolo Bertolucci / (Italy) Adriano Panatta
← 1974 ·	South American Open	· 1976 →

The 1975 South American Open also valid as the ATP Buenos Aires was a men's Grand Prix tennis circuit tournament played on outdoor clay courts in Buenos Aires, Argentina. The event was part of the 1975 Grand Prix circuit and was held from 10 November through 16 November 1975. First-seeded Guillermo Vilas won the singles title.

== Finals ==
=== Singles ===
(Argentina) Guillermo Vilas defeated (Italy) Adriano Panatta 6–1, 6–4, 6–4

- It was Vilas' 8th title of the year and the 20th of his career.

=== Doubles ===
(Italy) Paolo Bertolucci / (Italy) Adriano Panatta defeated (West Germany) Jürgen Fassbender / (West Germany) Hans-Jürgen Pohmann 3–6, 6–1, 8–6

- It was Bertolucci's 5th title of the year and the 8th of his career. It was Panatta's 6th title of the year and the 11th of his career.
