= 1973 Davis Cup =

1973 edition of the Davis Cup

Details
- Duration: 10 November 1972 – 2 December 1973
- Edition: 62nd
- Teams: 53

Champion
- Winning nation: Australia

The 1973 Davis Cup was the 62nd edition of the Davis Cup, the most important tournament between national teams in men's tennis. Fifty-three teams entered the competition, 31 in the Europe Zone, 12 in the Americas Zone, and 10 in the Eastern Zone.

For the first time, preliminary rounds were used in every zone, effectively giving byes through the first two rounds of competition to the previous year's finalists from the American and Eastern zones, and to the previous year's semifinalists from the European zones. This year's competition also marked the first time that professional tennis players were allowed to compete.

The United States defeated Chile in the Americas Inter-Zonal final, Australia defeated India in the Eastern Zone final, and Czechoslovakia and Romania were the winners of the two Europe Zones, defeating the Soviet Union and Italy respectively.

In the Inter-Zonal Zone, Australia defeated Czechoslovakia and the United States defeated Romania in the semifinals. Australia then defeated the United States in the final, breaking the defending champions' five-year winning run. The final was held at the Public Auditorium in Cleveland, Ohio, United States on 30 November-2 December. It marked the first time that the final was held indoors.

== Americas Zone ==
=== North & Central America Zone ===
==== Preliminary rounds ====
First Round; 23–25 February
Bogotá, Colombia (clay)
Colombia	4
Canada	1

Qualifying Round; 9–11 March
Bogotá, Colombia
Colombia	3
Caribbean/West Indies	2
Mexico City, Mexico (clay)
Mexico	4
Venezuela	1

==== Main Draw ====
Semifinals; 23–25 March
Mexico City, Mexico (clay)
Mexico	5
Colombia	0

Final; 11–13 May
Mexico City, Mexico (clay)
United States	4
Mexico	1

=== South America Zone ===
==== Preliminary rounds ====
First Round; 23–25 February
Buenos Aires, Argentina (clay)
Argentina	5
Ecuador	0

Qualifying Round; 2–4 March; 23–25 March
Buenos Aires, Argentina (clay)
Argentina	4
Brazil	1
Punta del Este, Uruguay
Uruguay	0
South Africa	5

==== Main Draw ====
Semifinals; 13–15 April
Montevideo, Uruguay (clay)
Argentina	4
South Africa	1

Final; 4–6 May
Buenos Aires, Argentina (clay)
Chile	3
Argentina	2

=== Americas Inter-Zonal Final ===
United States vs. Chile

United States
4
Burns Park Tennis Club, North Little Rock, Arkansas, United States
3–5 August 1973
Hard

Chile
0

			1	2	3	4	5
1	(United States) (Chile)	Tom Gorman; Jaime Fillol	17; 15	6; 4	4; 6	6; 3
2	(United States) (Chile)	Stan Smith; Patricio Cornejo	7; 9	6; 2	8; 6	6; 4
3	(United States) (Chile)	Stan Smith / Erik van Dillen; Patricio Cornejo / Jaime Fillol	7; 9	37; 39	8; 6	6; 1	6; 3
4	(United States) (Chile)	Tom Gorman; Patricio Cornejo	6; 3	6; 1	6; 1
5	(United States) (Chile)	Stan Smith; Jaime Fillol						not played

The doubles match between Smith/van Dillen and Cornejo/Fillol set the Davis Cup record for the most games in a doubles rubber (122). The second set, which went to 37-39, set the record for the most games played in a set (76).

== Eastern Zone ==
Preliminary round 23–28 March
Seoul, South Korea
South Korea	1
Japan	4
Jakarta, Indonesia
Indonesia	5
Hong Kong	0
Kuala Lumpur, Malaysia
Malaysia	0
Pakistan	3
Penang, Malaysia (grass)
South Vietnam	3
Sri Lanka	0

Quarterfinals
Tokyo, Japan
Japan	3
Indonesia	0
Kuala Lumpur, Malaysia (grass)
Pakistan	4
South Vietnam	1

Semifinals
Tokyo, Japan
Australia	4
Japan	1
Kuala Lumpur, Malaysia (grass)
Pakistan	0
India	4

Final
Madras, India
Australia	4
India	0

=== Final ===
India vs. Australia

India
0
Madras, India
4–6 May 1973

Australia
4

			1	2	3	4	5
1	(India) (Australia)	Anand Amritraj; John Newcombe	2; 6	1; 6	0; 6
2	(India) (Australia)	Vijay Amritraj; Mal Anderson	1; 6	2; 6	1; 6
3	(India) (Australia)	Vijay Amritraj / Premjit Lall; Geoff Masters / John Newcombe	6; 4	2; 6	5; 7	3; 6
4	(India) (Australia)	Premjit Lall; John Cooper	6; 4	0; 6	6; 8	1; 6
5	(India) (Australia)	Vijay Amritraj; John Newcombe	10; 12	6; 3				not completed

== Europe Zone ==
=== Zone A ===
==== Preliminary round ====
Preliminary round 13–22 April
Vienna, Austria
Austria	3
Monaco	0
Dublin, Ireland (indoor hard)
Ireland	0
Norway	5
Athens, Greece
Greece	3
Finland	2

==== Main Draw ====
First Round; 3–6 May
Romania
bye
Tel Aviv, Israel (hard)
Israel	1
Netherlands	4
Yugoslavia
bye
Vienna, Austria (clay)
Austria	2
New Zealand	3
Oslo, Norway (clay)
Norway	3
Denmark	2
bye
France
Athens, Greece
Greece	1
Hungary	4
bye
Soviet Union

Quarterfinals; 18–20 May
Scheveningen, Netherlands (clay)
Romania	3
Netherlands	2
Zagreb, Yugoslavia (clay)
Yugoslavia	2
New Zealand	3
Oslo, Norway (clay)
Norway	0
France	5
Budapest, Hungary
Hungary	2
Soviet Union	3

Semifinals; 20–22 July
Bucharest, Romania (clay)
Romania	4
New Zealand	1
Moscow, Soviet Union
France	2
Soviet Union	3

Final; 3–5 August
Bucharest, Romania
Romania	3
Soviet Union	2

==== Final ====
Romania vs. Soviet Union

Romania
3
Bucharest, Romania
3–5 August 1973
Clay

Soviet Union
2

			1	2	3	4	5
1	(Romania) (Soviet Union)	Toma Ovici; Alex Metreveli	5; 7	5; 7	2; 6
2	(Romania) (Soviet Union)	Ilie Năstase; Teimuraz Kakulia	6; 0	6; 3	6; 0
3	(Romania) (Soviet Union)	Ilie Năstase / Ionel Sânteiu; Sergei Likhachev / Alex Metreveli	0; 6	6; 3	4; 6	7; 5	2; 6
4	(Romania) (Soviet Union)	Ilie Năstase; Alex Metreveli	6; 0	6; 2	6; 4
5	(Romania) (Soviet Union)	Toma Ovici; Teimuraz Kakulia	6; 3	6; 3	6; 1

=== Zone B ===
==== Preliminary round ====
Preliminary round 10–12 November 1972; 6–22 April
Cairo, Egypt
Egypt	5
Turkey	0
Lisbon, Portugal (clay)
Portugal	0
Switzerland	5
Sofia, Bulgaria
Bulgaria	5
Iran	0
Casablanca, Morocco
Morocco	5
Luxembourg	0

Semifinals

Final

==== Main Draw ====
First Round; 27 April–6 May
Czechoslovakia
bye
Cairo, Egypt
Egypt	4
Poland	1
Great Britain
bye
Geneva, Switzerland
Switzerland	0
West Germany	3
Sofia, Bulgaria
Bulgaria	3
Belgium	2
bye
Italy
Rabat, Morocco (clay)
Morocco	1
Sweden	4
bye
Spain

Quarterfinals; 18–20 May
Cairo, Egypt (clay)
Czechoslovakia	4
Egypt	1
Munich, West Germany (clay)
Great Britain	1
West Germany	4
Reggio Emilia, Italy (clay)
Bulgaria	0
Italy	5
Båstad, Sweden (clay)
Sweden	2
Spain	3

Semifinals; 20–22 July
Prague, Czechoslovakia (clay)
Czechoslovakia	3
West Germany	2
Turin, Italy
Italy	3
Spain	2

Final; 3–5 August
Prague, Czechoslovakia (clay)
Czechoslovakia	4
Italy	1

==== Final ====
Czechoslovakia vs. Italy

Czechoslovakia
4
Prague, Czechoslovakia
3–5 August 1973
Clay

Italy
1

			1	2	3	4	5
1	(Czechoslovakia) (Italy)	Jan Kodeš; Corrado Barazzutti	5; 7	6; 3	4; 6	6; 2	1; 6
2	(Czechoslovakia) (Italy)	Jiří Hřebec; Antonio Zugarelli	12; 10	6; 1	6; 1
3	(Czechoslovakia) (Italy)	Jan Kodeš / František Pála; Giordano Majoli / Pietro Marzano	6; 2	8; 6	6; 4
4	(Czechoslovakia) (Italy)	Jiří Hřebec; Corrado Barazzutti	9; 7	6; 1	6; 4
5	(Czechoslovakia) (Italy)	Jan Kodeš; Antonio Zugarelli	6; 1	6; 3	0; 6	6; 2

== Inter-Zonal Zone ==
=== Draw ===
Semifinals; 17–19 August; 16–18 November
Melbourne, Australia
EUR-B	Czechoslovakia	1
EAS	Australia	4
Alamo, California, United States (hard)
AME	United States	4
EUR-A	Romania	1

Final; 30 November–2 December
Cleveland, Ohio, United States (indoor carpet)
EAS	Australia	5
AME	United States	0

=== Semifinals ===
Australia vs. Czechoslovakia

Australia
4
Kooyong Stadium, Melbourne, Australia
16–18 November 1973
Grass

Czechoslovakia
1

			1	2	3	4	5
1	(Australia) (Czechoslovakia)	Rod Laver; Jan Kodeš	6; 3	7; 5	7; 5
2	(Australia) (Czechoslovakia)	John Newcombe; Jiří Hřebec	4; 6	10; 8	4; 6	5; 7
3	(Australia) (Czechoslovakia)	Rod Laver / Ken Rosewall; Jan Kodeš / Vladimír Zedník	6; 4	14; 12	7; 9	8; 6
4	(Australia) (Czechoslovakia)	Rod Laver; Jiří Hřebec	5; 7	6; 3	6; 4	4; 6	6; 4
5	(Australia) (Czechoslovakia)	John Newcombe; Jan Kodeš	6; 2	6; 2	6; 4

United States vs. Romania

United States
4
Round Hill Country Club, Alamo, California, United States
17–19 August 1973
Hard

Romania
1

			1	2	3	4	5
1	(United States) (Romania)	Marty Riessen; Ilie Năstase	2; 6	4; 6	2; 6
2	(United States) (Romania)	Stan Smith; Toma Ovici	7; 5	6; 1	6; 3
3	(United States) (Romania)	Stan Smith / Erik van Dillen; Ilie Năstase / Ionel Sânteiu	6; 2	7; 5	6; 2
4	(United States) (Romania)	Marty Riessen; Toma Ovici	6; 1	4; 6	6; 1	7; 5
5	(United States) (Romania)	Stan Smith; Ilie Năstase	5; 7	6; 2	6; 3	4; 6	6; 3

=== Final ===
United States vs. Australia

United States
0
Public Auditorium, Cleveland, Ohio, United States
30 November–2 December 1973
Carpet (indoors)

Australia
5

			1	2	3	4	5
1	(United States) (Australia)	Stan Smith; John Newcombe	1; 6	6; 3	3; 6	6; 3	4; 6
2	(United States) (Australia)	Tom Gorman; Rod Laver	10; 8	6; 8	8; 6	3; 6	1; 6
3	(United States) (Australia)	Stan Smith / Erik van Dillen; Rod Laver / John Newcombe	1; 6	2; 6	4; 6
4	(United States) (Australia)	Tom Gorman; John Newcombe	2; 6	1; 6	3; 6
5	(United States) (Australia)	Stan Smith; Rod Laver	3; 6	4; 6	6; 3	2; 6
