= 1968 South American Open – Men's singles =

Men's singles
- 1968 South American Open

Final
- Champion: (Australia) Roy Emerson
- Runner-up: (Australia) Rod Laver
- Score: 9–7, 6–4, 6–4

Events
Singles	Doubles
← 1967 ·	South American Open	· 1969 →

Roy Emerson won in the final 9–7, 6–4, 6–4 against Rod Laver.

== Seeds ==
1. (Australia) Rod Laver (final)
2. (Spain) Andrés Gimeno (semifinals)
3. (Australia) Roy Emerson (champion)
4. (Australia) Fred Stolle (quarterfinals)

== Draw ==
=== Key ===
- Q = Qualifier
- WC = Wild card
- LL = Lucky loser
- Alt = Alternate
- ITF = ITF entry
- PR = Protected ranking
- SR = Special ranking
- SE = Special exempt
- JE = Junior exempt
- JR = Junior Accelerator Programme entrant
- CO = College Accelerator Programme entrant
- NG = Next Gen Accelerator Program entrant
- w/o = Walkover
- r = Retired
- d = Defaulted

Quarterfinals
1	(Australia) Rod Laver	6	6	6
(United States) Herb Fitzgibbon	1	4	4
4	(Australia) Fred Stolle	3	2	6	3
(Brazil) Thomaz Koch	6	6	0	6
(Czechoslovakia) Jan Kodeš	9	11	4	3
3	(Australia) Roy Emerson	11	9	6	6
(Brazil) José Edison Mandarino	1	6	8	3
2	(Spain) Andrés Gimeno	6	4	10	6

Semifinals
1	(Australia) Rod Laver	6	8	6
(Brazil) Thomaz Koch	2	6	2
3	(Australia) Roy Emerson	1	6	8	6	6
2	(Spain) Andrés Gimeno	6	4	10	4	4

Final
1	(Australia) Rod Laver	7	4	4
3	(Australia) Roy Emerson	9	6	6
