= 1969 South American Open =

- Date: 11–16 November
- Edition: 2nd
- Surface: Clay / outdoor
- Location: Buenos Aires, Argentina
- Venue: Buenos Aires Lawn Tennis Club

Champions

Singles
- (France) François Jauffret

Doubles
- (Chile) Patricio Cornejo / (Chile) Jaime Fillol Sr.
- South American Open

The 1969 South American Open was a professional tennis tournament played on outdoor clay courts at the Buenos Aires Lawn Tennis Club in Buenos Aires, Argentina from 11 November until 16 November 1969. Unseeded François Jauffret won the singles title.

== Finals ==
=== Singles ===
(France) François Jauffret defeated (Socialist Federal Republic of Yugoslavia) Željko Franulović 3–6, 6–2, 6–4, 6–3

- It was Jauffret's only singles title of the year and the 1st of his career.

=== Doubles ===
(Chile) Patricio Cornejo / (Chile) Jaime Fillol Sr. defeated (Australia) Roy Emerson / (South Africa) Frew McMillan 6–3, 9–7, 9–7

- It was Cornejo's only ATP title of the year and the 1st of his ATP career. It was Fillol's only ATP title of the year and the 1st of his ATP career.
