= 1977 ATP Buenos Aires (November) – Singles =

Guillermo Vilas defeated Jaime Fillol Sr. 6–2, 7–5, 3–6, 6–3 to win the November 1977 ATP Buenos Aires singles competition. Vilas was the defending champion.

== Seeds ==
A champion seed is indicated in bold text while text in italics indicates the round in which that seed was eliminated.

1. (Argentina) Guillermo Vilas **(Champion)**
2. (Chile) Jaime Fillol Sr. (Final)

== Draw ==
- NB: All rounds up to but not including the final were the best of 3 sets. The final was the best of 5 sets.

=== Final ===
Final
1	(Argentina) **Guillermo Vilas**	**6**	**7**	3	**6**
2	(Chile) Jaime Fillol Sr.	2	5	**6**	3

=== Section 1 ===
First Round
1	(Argentina) **G Vilas**	**7**	**6**
(France) É Deblicker	6	2
(Colombia) **I Molina**	**6**	2	**11**
(Argentina) C Landó	4	**6**	9
(Argentina) L Álvarez	2	6
(Romania) **I Țiriac**	**6**	**7**
(Chile) **B Prajoux**	**6**	**6**
(France) G Goven	4	4
(Chile) **H Gildemeister**	**7**	**6**
(Spain) J Soler	6	4
(United States) **H Bunis**	**7**	**7**
(United States) B Manson	6	5
(Australia) **P McNamee**	**6**	**6**
(Colombia) Á Betancur	2	4
(Venezuela) J Andrew	4	4
(United States) **M Fishbach**	**6**	**6**

Second Round
1	(Argentina) **G Vilas**	**6**	**6**
(Colombia) I Molina	3	0
(Romania) I Țiriac	6	5
(Chile) **B Prajoux**	**7**	**7**
(Chile) **H Gildemeister**	**6**	**6**
(United States) H Bunis	3	0
(Australia) P McNamee	4	4
(United States) **M Fishbach**	**6**	**6**

Quarterfinals
1	(Argentina) **G Vilas**	**6**	**6**
(Chile) B Prajoux	3	2
(Chile) **H Gildemeister**	**6**	**6**
(United States) M Fishbach	2	2

Semifinals
1	(Argentina) **G Vilas**	**7**	**6**
(Chile) H Gildemeister	6	4

=== Section 2 ===
First Round
(Paraguay) **V Pecci Sr.**	4	**6**	**6**
(Colombia) J Velasco Sr.	**6**	2	3
(New Zealand) O Parun	1	**6**	3
(United States) **Z Guerry**	**6**	3	**6**
(United States) **G Mayer**	**6**	**6**
(Spain) A Muñoz	4	3
(Argentina) E Caviglia	1	1
(Spain) **J Higueras**	**6**	**6**
(Argentina) R Cano	**6**	5	3
(Chile) **J Pinto-Bravo**	4	**7**	**6**
(Chile) **P Cornejo**	**6**	6	**7**
(Argentina) F Dalla Fontana	4	**7**	5
(Argentina) J L Clerc	5	**6**	3
(Brazil) **C Kirmayr**	**7**	0	**6**
(Bolivia) R Benavides	4	6
2	(Chile) **J Fillol Sr.**	**6**	**7**

Second Round
(Paraguay) **V Pecci Sr.**	**6**	**6**
(United States) Z Guerry	3	2
(United States) **G Mayer**	**6**	**6**
(Spain) J Higueras	1	4
(Chile) J Pinto-Bravo	**6**	4	1
(Chile) **P Cornejo**	4	**6**	**6**
(Brazil) C Kirmayr	4	5
2	(Chile) **J Fillol Sr.**	**6**	**7**

Quarterfinals
(Paraguay) **V Pecci Sr.**	**6**	6	**6**
(United States) G Mayer	3	**7**	1
(Chile) P Cornejo	1	0
2	(Chile) **J Fillol Sr.**	**6**	**6**

Semifinals
(Paraguay) V Pecci Sr.	**6**	1	4
2	(Chile) **J Fillol Sr.**	4	**6**	**6**
