= 1971 U.S. Clay Court Championships =

- Date: August 16–22
- Edition: 3rd
- Category: Grand Prix (Group B)
- Draw: 64S / 32D
- Surface: Clay / outdoor
- Location: Indianapolis, Indiana; United States

Champions

Men's singles
- (Socialist Federal Republic of Yugoslavia) Željko Franulović

Women's singles
- (United States) Billie Jean King

Men's doubles
- (Socialist Federal Republic of Yugoslavia) Željko Franulović / (Czechoslovakia) Jan Kodeš

Women's doubles
- (Australia) Judy Dalton / (United States) Billie Jean King
- U.S. Clay Court Championships

The 1971 U.S. Clay Court Championships was a combined men's and women's tennis tournament that was part of the 1971 Grand Prix circuit and categorized as a Group B event. The event was held in Indianapolis in the United States and played on outdoor clay courts. It was the third edition of the tournament in the Open Era and was held in from August 16 through August 22, 1971. Željko Franulović and Billie Jean King won the singles titles.

== Finals ==
=== Men's singles ===
(Socialist Federal Republic of Yugoslavia) Željko Franulović defeated (United States) Cliff Richey 6–3, 6–4, 0–6, 6–3

=== Women's singles ===
(United States) Billie Jean King defeated (United States) Linda Tuero 6–4, 7–5

=== Men's doubles ===
(Socialist Federal Republic of Yugoslavia) Željko Franulović / (Czechoslovakia) Jan Kodeš defeated (United States) Clark Graebner / (United States) Erik van Dillen 7–6, 5–7, 6–3

=== Women's doubles ===
(Australia) Judy Dalton / (United States) Billie Jean King defeated (United States) Julie Heldman / (United States) Linda Tuero 6–1, 6–2
