= 1971 South American Open =

- Date: 25 November – 1 December
- Edition: 4th
- Category: Grand Prix (Group B)
- Surface: Clay
- Location: Buenos Aires, Argentina

Champions

Men's singles
- (Socialist Federal Republic of Yugoslavia) Željko Franulović

Women's singles
- (West Germany) Helga Masthoff

Men's doubles
- (Socialist Federal Republic of Yugoslavia) Željko Franulović / (Romania) Ilie Năstase

Women's doubles
- (West Germany) Helga Masthoff / (West Germany) Heide Orth
- South American Open Championships

The 1971 South American Open Championships, was a combined men's and women's tennis tournament played on outdoor clay courts and held in Buenos Aires, Argentina. The men's event was part of the 1971 Pepsi-Cola Grand Prix. The event was held from 25 November though 1 December 1971. Željko Franulović and Helga Masthoff won the singles titles.

== Finals ==
=== Men's singles ===
(Socialist Federal Republic of Yugoslavia) Željko Franulović defeated (Romania) Ilie Năstase 6–3, 7–6, 6–1

- It was Franulovic's 7th ATP title of the year and the 11th of his ATP career.

=== Women's singles ===
(West Germany) Helga Masthoff defeated (West Germany) Heide Orth 6–4, 7–5

=== Men's doubles ===
(Socialist Federal Republic of Yugoslavia) Željko Franulović / (Romania) Ilie Năstase defeated (Chile) Patricio Cornejo / (Chile) Jaime Fillol Sr.

- It was Franulovic's 6th ATP title of the year and the 10th of his ATP career. It was Nastase's 9th ATP title of the year and the 15th of his ATP career.

=== Women's doubles ===
(West Germany) Helga Masthoff / (West Germany) Heide Orth defeated (Chile) Ana María Pinto Bravo / (Argentina) Raquel Giscafré 6–0, 6–2
