= Toma Ovici =

Romanian tennis player

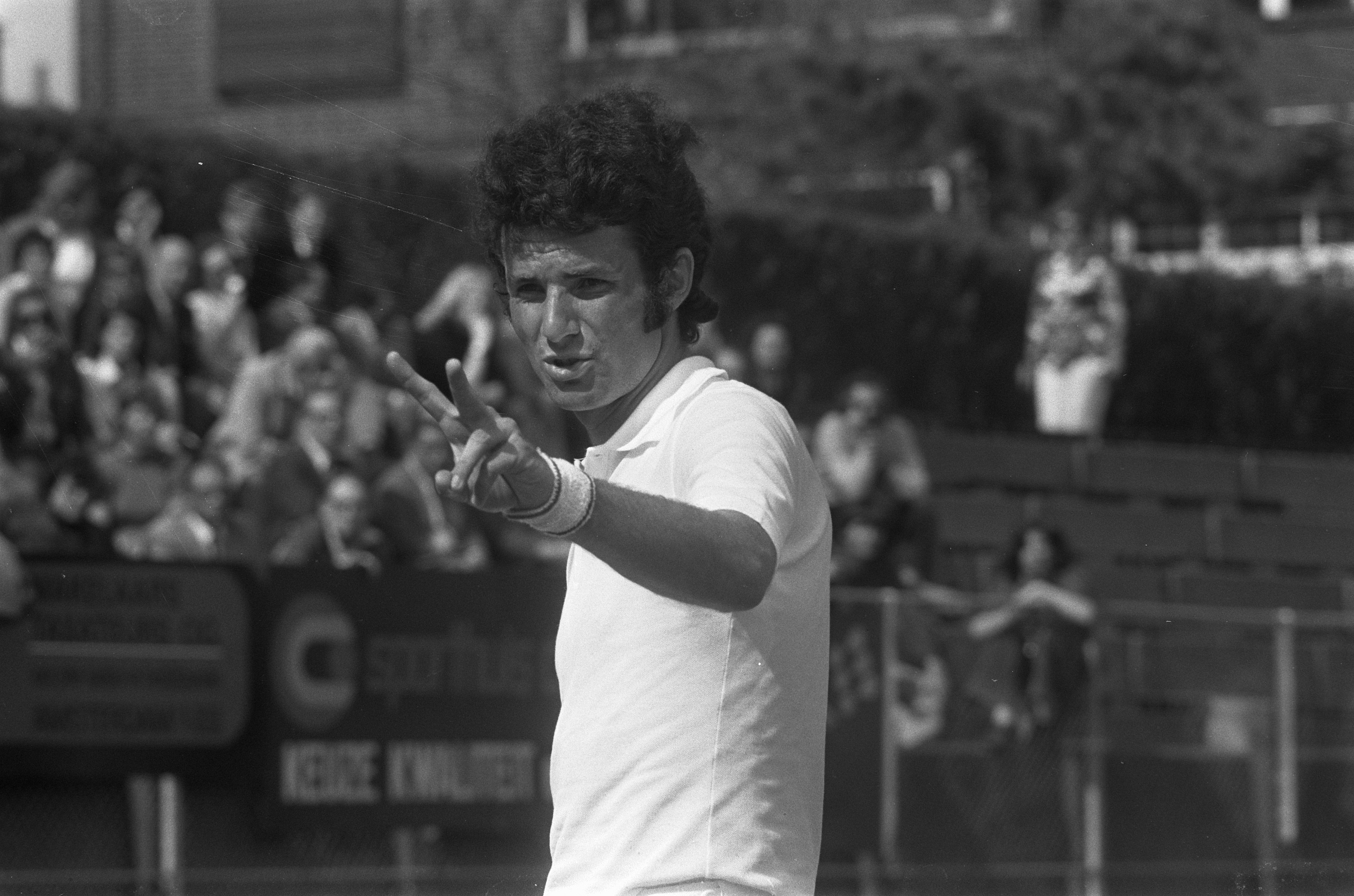
- Country (sports): Romania
- Born: May 1949 (age 77) Târgu Mureș, Romania

Singles
- Career record: 20–29
- Highest ranking: No. 133 (9 August 1974)

Grand Slam singles results
- French Open: 2R (1974, 1975)
- US Open: 2R (1973)

Doubles
- Career record: 3–13

Grand Slam doubles results
- French Open: 1R (1973)

Toma Ovici (born 31 or 13 May 1949 to Jewish Holocaust survivors in Târgu Mureș, Romania) is a right-handed former Romanian tennis player. His highest ATP ranking was number 133, achieved on August 9, 1974. At the end of 1973, finished ranked 53 in the Commercial Union Grand Prix Table. Twice Romanian Singles Champion in 1973 and 1975 respectively.

Best results in ATP Tournaments, Quarterfinals in Buenos Aires, 1973 1973 South American Open – Singles and Dusseldorf 1975.

Davis Cup Record in Singles Matches, 5 Wins and 9 Losses

Best Result in Davis Cup, semifinal in 1973 1973 Davis Cup Main Draw
