= 1975 ATP Buenos Aires – Singles =

Guillermo Vilas defeated Adriano Panatta 6–1, 6–4, 6–4 to win the 1975 ATP Buenos Aires singles competition. Vilas was the defending champion.

== Seeds ==
A champion seed is indicated in bold text while text in italics indicates the round in which that seed was eliminated.

1. (Argentina) Guillermo Vilas **(Champion)**
2. (Italy) Adriano Panatta (Final)

== Draw ==
=== Key ===
- R – Retired
- WO – Walkover
- NB: All rounds up to but not including the semifinals were the best of 3 sets. The semifinals and final were the best of 5 sets.

=== Final ===
Final
1	(Argentina) **Guillermo Vilas**	**6**	**6**	**6**
2	(Italy) Adriano Panatta	1	4	4

=== Section 1 ===
First Round
1	(Argentina) **G Vilas**	**6**	**6**
(Argentina) R Carruthers	2	3
(Argentina) **L Álvarez**	**6**	**6**
(United States) T Waltke	1	3
(Socialist Federal Republic of Yugoslavia) **Z Franulović**	**6**	**6**
(Chile) B Prajoux	1	4
(Bolivia) R Benavides	1	6
(West Germany) **H J Pohmann**	**6**	**7**
(United States) V Gerulaitis	4	**6**	5
(Argentina) **R Cano**	**6**	2	**7**
(Argentina) T Quintin	3	2
(West Germany) **U Pinner**	**6**	**6**
(Colombia) **I Molina**	2	**6**	**6**
**6**	0	4
**6**	2	2
(France) **J Thamin**	3	**6**	**6**

Second Round
1	(Argentina) **G Vilas**	**6**	**7**
(Argentina) L Álvarez	4	5
(Socialist Federal Republic of Yugoslavia) **Z Franulović**	**6**	6	**6**
(West Germany) H J Pohmann	0	**7**	2
(Argentina) **R Cano**	**6**	4	**6**
(West Germany) U Pinner	1	**6**	2
(Colombia) **I Molina**	**6**	**6**
(France) J Thamin	2	4

Quarterfinals
1	(Argentina) **G Vilas**	**7**	**6**
(Socialist Federal Republic of Yugoslavia) Z Franulović	5	3
(Argentina) **R Cano**	3	**6**	**6**
(Colombia) I Molina	**6**	2	4

Semifinals
1	(Argentina) **G Vilas**	**6**	**7**	**6**
(Argentina) R Cano	2	5	3

=== Section 2 ===
First Round
(Chile) P Rodríguez	5	3
(Brazil) **C Kirmayr**	**7**	**6**
(United States) V Amaya	0	4
(Paraguay) **V Pecci Sr.**	**6**	**6**
(Argentina) **J Ganzábal**	**7**	6	**6**
(Austria) H Kary	6	**7**	3
3	1
(Chile) **J Fillol Sr.**	**6**	**6**
(Brazil) **J Mandarino**	**6**	**6**
(Argentina) C Landó	4	4
(Brazil) **T Koch**	4	**6**	**6**
(Italy) P Bertolucci	**6**	2	4
(Chile) **P Cornejo**	**6**	**2**
(West Germany) J Fassbender	3	0	R
(Colombia) J Velasco Sr.	3	2
2	(Italy) **A Panatta**	**6**	**6**

Second Round
(Brazil) C Kirmayr	2	3
(Paraguay) **V Pecci Sr.**	**6**	**6**
(Argentina) J Ganzábal	2	3
(Chile) **J Fillol Sr.**	**6**	**6**
(Brazil) **J Mandarino**	WO
(Brazil) T Koch
(Chile) P Cornejo	4	6
2	(Italy) **A Panatta**	**6**	**7**

Quarterfinals
(Paraguay) V Pecci Sr.	5	0
(Chile) **J Fillol Sr.**	**7**	**6**
(Brazil) J Mandarino	4	3
2	(Italy) **A Panatta**	**6**	**6**

Semifinals
(Chile) J Fillol Sr.	2	3	**6**	**7**	3
2	(Italy) **A Panatta**	**6**	**6**	4	6	**6**
