= 1978 South American Championships (tennis) =

- Date: 20–26 November
- Edition: 12th
- Category: Grand Prix Super Series
- Draw: 32S / 16D
- Prize money: $175,000
- Surface: Clay / outdoor
- Location: Buenos Aires, Argentina

Champions

Singles
- (Argentina) José Luis Clerc

Doubles
- (New Zealand) Chris Lewis / (United States) Van Winitsky
← 1977 ·	South American Championships	· 1979 →

The 1978 South American Championships was a men's Grand Prix tennis circuit tournament held in Buenos Aires, Argentina and played on outdoor clay courts. The event was held from 20 November through 26 November 1978. Fourth-seeded José Luis Clerc won the singles title.

== Finals ==
=== Singles ===
(Argentina) José Luis Clerc defeated (Paraguay) Víctor Pecci 6–4, 6–4

- It was Clerc's 2nd singles title of the year and of his career.

=== Doubles ===
(New Zealand) Chris Lewis / (United States) Van Winitsky defeated (Argentina) José Luis Clerc / (Chile) Belus Prajoux 6–4, 3–6, 6–0

- It was Lewis' 3rd title of the year and the 5th of his career. It was Winitsky's 2nd title of the year and the 2nd of his career.
