= 1971 Monte Carlo Open – Men's singles =

Men's singles
- 1971 Monte Carlo Open

Final
- Champion: (Romania) Ilie Năstase
- Runner-up: (Netherlands) Tom Okker
- Score: 3–6, 8–6, 6–1, 6–1

Details
- Draw: 32
- Seeds: 8

Events
Singles	men	women
Doubles	men	women
← 1970 ·	Monte-Carlo Masters	· 1972 →

The 1971 Monte Carlo Open – Men's singles was an event of the 1971 Monte Carlo Open tennis tournament. Željko Franulović was the defending champion but did not compete in this edition. Third-seeded Ilie Năstase won the singles title by defeating first-seeded Tom Okker 3–6, 8–6, 6–1, 6–1 in the final.

== Seeds ==
1. (Netherlands) Tom Okker (final)
2. (United Kingdom) Roger Taylor (semifinals)
3. (Romania) Ilie Năstase (champion)
4. (Czechoslovakia) Jan Kodeš (first round)
5. (Romania) Ion Țiriac (semifinals)
6. (Spain) Manuel Orantes (second round)
7. (France) Pierre Barthès (quarterfinals)
8. (Egypt) Ismail El Shafei (first round)

== Draw ==
=== Key ===
- Q = Qualifier
- WC = Wild card
- LL = Lucky loser
- Alt = Alternate
- SE = Special exempt
- PR = Protected ranking
- ITF = ITF entry
- JE = Junior exempt
- w/o = Walkover
- r = Retired
- d = Defaulted
- SR = Special ranking

=== Finals ===
Semifinals
2	(United Kingdom) Roger Taylor	6	5	1
3	(Romania) Ilie Năstase	2	7	6
5	(Romania) Ion Țiriac	4	0	6
1	(Netherlands) Tom Okker	6	6	4

Final
3	(Romania) Ilie Năstase	3	8	6
1	(Netherlands) Tom Okker	6	6	1

=== Top half ===
First Round
2	(United Kingdom) Roger Taylor	6	6
(Spain) José Luis Arilla	4	2
(France) Patrice Dominguez	6	5	7
(Germany) Wilhelm Bungert	1	7	5
7	(France) Pierre Barthès	6	6
(Czechoslovakia) František Pála	3	4
(Sweden) Håkan Zahr	6	6
(Australia) Bill Bowrey	1	3
3	(Romania) Ilie Năstase	6	6
(France) Jean-Loup Rouyer	1	0
(Poland) Wiesław Gąsiorek	6	3	6
(Hungary) István Gulyás	3	6	3
6	(Spain) Manuel Orantes	9	6
(France) Wanaro N'Godrella	7	4
(Australia) Dick Crealy	6	2	6
(Hungary) Péter Szőke	4	6	4

Second Round
2	(United Kingdom) Roger Taylor	6	6	6
(France) Patrice Dominguez	3	2	8
7	(France) Pierre Barthès	6	6	6
(Sweden) Håkan Zahr	0	2	2
3	(Romania) Ilie Năstase	6	6	6
(Poland) Wiesław Gąsiorek	3	1	4
6	(Spain) Manuel Orantes	6	4	3
(Australia) Dick Crealy	4	6	6

Quarterfinals
2	(United Kingdom) Roger Taylor	3	6	6
7	(France) Pierre Barthès	6	3	2
3	(Romania) Ilie Năstase	6	6	7
(Australia) Dick Crealy	3	4	9

Semifinals
2	(United Kingdom) Roger Taylor	6	5	1
3	(Romania) Ilie Năstase	2	7	6

=== Bottom half ===
First Round
(Czechoslovakia) Jan Kukal	6	7
(France) Jean-Baptiste Chanfreau	4	5
(Hungary) Szabolcs Baranyi	4	0
5	(Romania) Ion Țiriac	6	6
(Australia) Barry Phillips-Moore	w/o
(United Kingdom) Graham Stilwell
(France) Patrick Proisy	5	6	6
4	(Czechoslovakia) Jan Kodeš	7	3	1
(Socialist Federal Republic of Yugoslavia) Boro Jovanović	6	2	6
(France) François Jauffret	2	6	4
(Belgium) Eric Drossart	9	6
8	(Egypt) Ismail El Shafei	7	3
(Australia) Allan Stone	6	4	6
(France) Jean-Claude Barclay	4	6	0
(France) Patrice Beust	3	2
1	(Netherlands) Tom Okker	6	6

Second Round
(Czechoslovakia) Jan Kukal	8	0	6
5	(Romania) Ion Țiriac	10	6	8
(Australia) Barry Phillips-Moore	2	2	2
(France) Patrick Proisy	6	6	6
(Socialist Federal Republic of Yugoslavia) Boro Jovanović	6	6	6
(Belgium) Eric Drossart	3	2	2
(Australia) Allan Stone	2	2	3
1	(Netherlands) Tom Okker	6	6	6

Quarterfinals
5	(Romania) Ion Țiriac	6	4	6
(France) Patrick Proisy	4	6	3
(Socialist Federal Republic of Yugoslavia) Boro Jovanović	5	2	6
1	(Netherlands) Tom Okker	7	6	1

Semifinals
5	(Romania) Ion Țiriac	4	0	6
1	(Netherlands) Tom Okker	6	6	4
