= 1971 Monte Carlo Open =

- Date: 12–17 April
- Edition: 65th
- Category: Grand Prix circuit (Group C)
- Draw: 32S/16D
- Surface: Clay / outdoor
- Location: Roquebrune-Cap-Martin, France
- Venue: Monte Carlo Country Club

Champions

Men's singles
- (Romania) Ilie Năstase

Women's singles
- (France) Gail Chanfreau

Men's doubles
- (Romania) Ilie Năstase / (Romania) Ion Țiriac

Women's doubles
- (West Germany) Katja Ebbinghaus / (Netherlands) Betty Stöve
← 1970 ·	Monte Carlo Open	· 1972 →

The 1971 Monte Carlo Open was a combined men's and women's tennis tournament played on outdoor clay courts at the Monte Carlo Country Club in Roquebrune-Cap-Martin, France. The men's tournament was part of the 1971 Pepsi-Cola Grand Prix circuit. It was the 65th edition of the event and was held from 12 April through 17 April 1971. Ilie Năstase and Gail Chanfreau won the singles titles.

== Finals ==
=== Men's singles ===
(Romania) Ilie Năstase defeated (Netherlands) Tom Okker 3–6, 8–6, 6–1, 6–1

=== Women's singles ===
(France) Gail Chanfreau defeated (Netherlands) Betty Stöve 6–4, 4–6, 6–4

=== Men's doubles ===
(Romania) Ilie Năstase / (Romania) Ion Țiriac defeated (Netherlands) Tom Okker / (United Kingdom) Roger Taylor 1–6, 6–3, 6–3, 8–6

=== Women's doubles ===
(West Germany) Katja Ebbinghaus / (Netherlands) Betty Stöve defeated (Italy) Lucia Bassi / (Italy) Lea Pericoli 6–4, 6–3
