= 1971 Monte Carlo Open – Men's doubles =

Men's doubles
- 1971 Monte Carlo Open

Final
- Champion: (Romania) Ilie Năstase (Romania) Ion Țiriac
- Runner-up: (Netherlands) Tom Okker (United Kingdom) Roger Taylor
- Score: 1–6, 6–3, 6–3, 8–6

Details
- Draw: 15
- Seeds: 2

Events
Singles	men	women
Doubles	men	women
← 1970 ·	Monte-Carlo Masters	· 1972 →

The 1971 Monte Carlo Open – Men's doubles was an event of the 1971 Monte Carlo Open tennis tournament. Marty Riessen and Roger Taylor were the defending champions but did not compete together in this edition. First-seeded team of Ilie Năstase and Ion Țiriac won the doubles title by defeating the first-seeded pairing of Tom Okker and Roger Taylor in the final 1–6, 6–3, 6–3, 8–6.

== Seeds ==
1. (Romania) Ilie Năstase / (Romania) Ion Țiriac (champions)
2. (Netherlands) Tom Okker / (United Kingdom) Roger Taylor (final)

== Draw ==
=== Key ===
- Q = Qualifier
- WC = Wild card
- LL = Lucky loser
- Alt = Alternate
- SE = Special exempt
- PR = Protected ranking
- ITF = ITF entry
- JE = Junior exempt
- w/o = Walkover
- r = Retired
- d = Defaulted
- SR = Special ranking

First Round
2	(Netherlands) Tom Okker (United Kingdom) Roger Taylor
BYE
(France) Patrice Dominguez (France) Patrick Proisy	6	8	7
(Belgium) Eric Drossart (Belgium) Patrick Hombergen	8	6	5
(Australia) Bill Bowrey (Australia) Robert Howe	3	8	7
(West Germany) Wilhelm Bungert (West Germany) Hans-Jürgen Pohmann	6	6	5
(Spain) José Luis Arilla (Spain) Manuel Orantes	6	6
(France) Jean-Claude Barclay (France) Daniel Contet	3	3
(Australia) Dick Crealy (Australia) Allan Stone	6	6
(Spain) Jose Guerrero (United States) Gonzalo Núñez	4	4
(Sweden) Kjell Johansson (Sweden) Håkan Zahr	7	6
(France) Pierre Barthès (France) Georges Goven	5	2
(France) François Jauffret (France) Jean-Loup Rouyer	6	6
(Hungary) István Gulyás (Czechoslovakia) František Pála	0	2
(France) Patrice Beust (France) Bernard Paul	6	4
1	(Romania) Ilie Năstase (Romania) Ion Țiriac	8	6

Quarterfinals
2	(Netherlands) Tom Okker (United Kingdom) Roger Taylor	6	6
(France) Patrice Dominguez (France) Patrick Proisy	2	1
(Australia) Bill Bowrey (Australia) Robert Howe	1	3
(Spain) José Luis Arilla (Spain) Manuel Orantes	6	6
(Australia) Dick Crealy (Australia) Allan Stone	6	6
(Sweden) Kjell Johansson (Sweden) Håkan Zahr	2	2
(France) François Jauffret (France) Jean-Loup Rouyer	7	3
1	(Romania) Ilie Năstase (Romania) Ion Țiriac	9	6

Semifinals
2	(Netherlands) Tom Okker (United Kingdom) Roger Taylor	4	6	6
(Spain) José Luis Arilla (Spain) Manuel Orantes	6	3	4
(Australia) Dick Crealy (Australia) Allan Stone	9	1	6
1	(Romania) Ilie Năstase (Romania) Ion Țiriac	7	6	8

Final
2	(Netherlands) Tom Okker (United Kingdom) Roger Taylor	6	3	3
1	(Romania) Ilie Năstase (Romania) Ion Țiriac	1	6	6
