= 1976 South American Championships (tennis) =

Men's tennis tournament in Argentina

- Date: 22–28 November
- Edition: 9th
- Category: Grand Prix (Two Star)
- Draw: 32S/16D
- Prize money: $50,000
- Surface: Clay / outdoor
- Location: Buenos Aires, Argentina

Champions

Singles
- (Argentina) Guillermo Vilas

Doubles
- (Brazil) Carlos Kirmayr / (Argentina) Tito Vázquez
- South American Championships

The 1976 South American Championships was a men's tennis tournament played on outdoor clay courts in Buenos Aires, Argentina that was part of the 1976 Commercial Union Assurance Grand Prix and held from 22 November through 28 November 1976. First-seeded Guillermo Vilas won the singles title.

== Finals ==
=== Singles ===
(Argentina) Guillermo Vilas defeated (Chile) Jaime Fillol 6–2, 6–2, 6–3

- It was Vilas's 6th title of the year and the 27th of his career.

=== Doubles ===
(Brazil) Carlos Kirmayr / (Argentina) Tito Vázquez defeated (Argentina) Ricardo Cano / (Chile) Belus Prajoux 6–4, 7–5

- It was Kirmayr's 4th title of the year and the 4th of his career. It was Vasquez's only title of the year and the 2nd of his career.
