= South American Championships (tennis) =

Defunct tennis tournament
- Tour: ILTF Circuit (1913-1939)
- Founded: 1921; 105 years ago
- Abolished: 1982; 44 years ago
- Location: Argentina; Brazil; Chile; Ecuador
- Venue: Buenos Aires LTC
- Surface: Grass - outdoors

The South American Championships for tennis consist of two versions the first is the team event tournaments for men and women organised by the South America Tennis Confederation. The team version for men is known as the Mitre Cup (f.1921). and the team version for women is known as the Osario Cup (f.1957).

The second version is a singles and doubles championship tournament sanctioned by the South American Tennis Confederation but organised by the individual South American Tennis Associations when played in those countries. This tournament was first held in 1927. This event has not always been staged continually until 1946.

== History ==
=== South American Championships (teams) ===
==== Seniors ====
The South American Championships organised by the South American Tennis Confederation is made up of all ten South American Tennis Associations. The senior men's team event is called the Mitre Cup that was founded in 1921 and was held in Argentine Tennis Team and won by Argentina. The senior women's team event known as Osario Cup was first held in 1957 in Santiago, Chile and was won by Chilean Tennis Team.

==== Juniors ====
The South American Championships for junior boys consists of two team tournaments the first is for boys age 18 years old who compete for the Bolivia Cup first held in 1953 that was won by Brazil. The second is the tournament for boys age 15 years old who compete for the Harten Cup first played in 1963 and won by Brazil.

The South American Championships for junior girls consists of two team tournaments the first is for girls age 18 years old who compete for the Colombia Cup first held in 1963 that was won by Argentina. The second is the tournament for girls age 15 years old who compete for the Chile Cup first played in 1965 and won by Chile.

All of the team competitions are organised and run similar way to the Davis Cup.

=== South American Championships (individual) ===
The early editions South American Championships for individual players was organised by the Argentina Tennis Association (ATA) for men and women was held in 1927 at the Buenos Aires Lawn Tennis Club. In 1928 and 1929 the tournament was held at the Tennis Club Argentino (f.1913), that was also valid as the Argentine Championships, also known as the Championship of the Argentine Republic. At this time there was no continental wide tennis organisation for South America and the event was not held again. In 1946 the tournament revived by the Argentina Tennis Association with the Argentina International Championships also carrying the denomination South American Championships. In 1947 the South American Tennis Confederation was established and formally incorporated in 1948.

In 1952 the tournament was held in Rio de Janeiro, Brazil with the event also being valid as the Rio de Janeiro International Championships. In 1953 and 1956 the tournaments were held in Santiago, Chile with the events also being valid as the Chilean National Championships. In 1972 the tournament was held in Guayaquil, Ecuador with that event also being valid as the Ecuadorian National Championships.

In April 1968 the open era began and in November 1968 this tournament was renamed as the South American Open Championships. From 1947 to 1969 it was part of the ILTF South American Circuit. In 1970 it became part of the ILTF Grand Prix Circuit.

The tournament for the majority of its duration has been staged in Argentina.

== South American Championships (individual) ==
Notes: These rolls included content from the Argentina International Championships, later ATP Argentina Open and WTA Argentine Open, since 1946, when both tournaments were also valid as the South American Championships or South American Open.

=== Men's singles ===
(incomplete roll)

South American Championships
Year	Location	Champion	Runner up	Score
↓ ILTF South American Circuit ↓
1927 (Note: The 1927 South American Championship and first edition organised by the Argentina Tennis Association (ATA) and was held at the Tennis Club Argentino and was also valid as the Argentine Championship also called the Championship of the Republic.)	Buenos Aires	(Argentina) Ronaldo Boyd	(Argentina) Guillermo Robson	9–7, 7–5, 7–5.
1928 (Note: The 1928 South American Championship and second ATA edition was held at the Tennis Club Argentino and was also valid as the Argentine Championship also called the Championship of the Republic.)	Buenos Aires	(Spain) Manuel Alonso Areizaga	(Argentina) Francisco Bryans	8–6, 6–3, 6–1.
1929 (Note: The 1929 South American Championship and third ATA edition was held at the Tennis Club Argentino and was also valid as the Argentine Championship also called the Championship of the Republic.)	Buenos Aires	(Argentina) Carlos Morea	(Argentina) Lucilo del Castillo	6–4, 6–4, 3–6, 4–6, 7–5.
1946	Buenos Aires	(United States) Bob Falkenburg	(Argentina) Enrique Morea	6–4, 5–7, 6–4, 3–6, 7–5
1947	Buenos Aires	(United States) Frank Parker	(Argentina) Enrique Morea	6–2, 6–4, 6–2
1948	Buenos Aires	(South Africa) Eric Sturgess	(United States) Vic Seixas	6–1, 3–6, 6–3, 6–4
1949 (Note: The 1949 South American Championship 4th edition organised by the South American Tennis Confederation (SATA) and was held at the Buenos Aires Lawn Tennis Club and was also valid as the 21st Argentina International Championships.)	Buenos Aires	(Argentina) Enrique Morea	(United States) Tom Brown	7–5, 6–3, 6–3.
1950 (Note: The 1950 South American Championship 5th edition organised by (SATA)and was held at the Buenos Aires Lawn Tennis Club and was also valid as the 22nd Argentina International Championships.)	Buenos Aires	(Argentina) Enrique Morea(2)	(Argentina) Ricardo Balbiers	4–6, 3–6, 6–2, 6–1, 6–2.
1951	Buenos Aires	(Argentina) Enrique Morea (3)	(Italy) Fausto Gardini	6–3, 6–1, 6–3
1952 (Note: The 1952 South American Championship 7th edition organised by (SATA)and was held Rio de Janeiro.)	Rio de Janeiro	(Egypt) Jaroslav Drobný	(Argentina) Ricardo Balbiers	6–4, 6–4, 6–1.
1953	Santiago	(Argentina) Enrique Morea (4)	(Egypt) Jaroslav Drobný	3-6, 6-3, 6-4, 6-4.
1954	Buenos Aires	(Argentina) Enrique Morea (5)	(Egypt) Jaroslav Drobný	2–6, 6–3, 6–3, 6–0
1955	Buenos Aires	(Chile) Luis Ayala	(United States) Art Larsen	6–2, 6–4, 0–6, 6–0
1956 (Note: The 1956 South American Championship 10th edition organised by (SATA)and was held Santiago, Chile and was also valid as the Chile National Championships.)	Santiago	(Chile) Luis Ayala (2)	(Australia) Mervyn Rose	6-2, 6-4, 3-6, 4-6, 9-7
1957	Buenos Aires	(Chile) Luis Ayala (3)	(Argentina) Enrique Morea	6–8, 6–4, 6–2, 6–2
1958	Buenos Aires	(Mexico) Mario Llamas	(Argentina) Enrique Morea	6–4, 9–7, 1–6, 2–6, ?
1959	Buenos Aires	(Spain) Manuel Santana	(Chile) Luis Ayala	6–2, 7–5, 2–6, 9–7
1960	Buenos Aires	(Chile) Luis Ayala (4)	(Spain) Manuel Santana	6–3, 3–6, 6–3, 7–5, 8–6
1961	Buenos Aires	(France) Pierre Darmon	(Argentina) Enrique Morea	6–1, 6–1, 6–1
1962	Buenos Aires	(Sweden) Jan-Erik Lundqvist	(Chile) Patricio Rodríguez	2–6, 6–4, 7–5, 2–6, 6–3
1963	Buenos Aires	(Italy) Nicola Pietrangeli	(Brazil) Ronald Barnes	6–2, 4–6, 6–4, 6–3
1964	Buenos Aires	(United States) Chuck McKinley	(Spain) Manuel Santana	6–4, 1–6, 4–6, 6–3, 4–5, retired
1965	Buenos Aires	(Italy) Nicola Pietrangeli (2)	(South Africa) Cliff Drysdale	6–8, 6–4, 6–0, 1–6, 7–5
1966	Buenos Aires	(United States) Cliff Richey	(Brazil) Thomaz Koch	6–3, 6–2, 2–6, 6–0
1967	Buenos Aires	(United States) Cliff Richey (2)	(Brazil) José Edison Mandarino	7–5, 6–8, 6–3, 6–3
South American Open Championships / South American Open
1968	Buenos Aires	(Australia) Roy Emerson	(Australia) Rod Laver	9–7, 6–4, 6–4.
↓ Open era ↓
↓ ILTF Grand Prix Circuit ↓
1970	Buenos Aires	(Socialist Federal Republic of Yugoslavia) Željko Franulović	(Spain) Manuel Orantes	6–4, 6–2, 6–0.
1971	Buenos Aires	(Socialist Federal Republic of Yugoslavia) Željko Franulović (2)	(Romania) Ilie Năstase	6–3, 7–6, 6–1.
1972 (Note: The 1972 South American Championship 27th edition organised by (SATA)and was held in Guayaquil, Ecuador and was also valid as the Ecuadorian National Championships.)	Guayaquil	(Colombia) Iván Molina	(Argentina) Julian Ganzabal	w.o.
1973	Buenos Aires	(Argentina) Guillermo Vilas	(Sweden) Björn Borg	3–6, 6–7, 6–4, 6–6^{(5–5)} retd.
1974	Buenos Aires	(Argentina) Guillermo Vilas(2)	(Spain) Manuel Orantes	6–3, 0–6, 7–5, 6–2.
1975	Buenos Aires	(Argentina) Guillermo Vilas (3)	(Italy) Adriano Panatta	6–1, 6–4, 6–4.
1976	Buenos Aires	(Argentina) Guillermo Vilas (4)	(Chile) Jaime Fillol	6–2, 6–2, 6–3.
1978	Buenos Aires	(Argentina) José Luis Clerc	(Paraguay) Víctor Pecci	6–4, 6–4.
1979	Buenos Aires	(Argentina) Guillermo Vilas (5)	(Argentina) José Luis Clerc	6–1, 6–2, 6–2 .
1980	Buenos Aires	(Argentina) José Luis Clerc	(West Germany) Rolf Gehring	6–7, 2–6, 7–5, 6–0, 6–3.
1981	Buenos Aires	(Czechoslovakia) Ivan Lendl	(Argentina) Guillermo Vilas	6–2, 6–2.
1982 (Note: The 1982 edition failed to find a sponsor in Argentina its normal home so was transferred to Brazil for that season only, and was also valid as the Brazil Open for that year.)	Sao Paulo	(Argentina) José Luis Clerc (2)	(Brazil) Marcos Hocevar	6–2, 6–7, 6–3.

=== Women's singles ===
(incomplete roll)

South American Championships
Year	Location	Champion	Runner up	Score
↓ ILTF South American Circuit ↓
1928	Buenos Aires	(Argentina) Analia Obarrio de Aguirre	(Argentina) Maria Elena Bushell	6-0, 6-1
1929	Buenos Aires	(Argentina) Analia Obarrio de Aguirre (2)	(Argentina) Maria Elena Bushell	6-4, 6-1
1946	Buenos Aires	(United States) Margaret Osborne	(United States) Louise Brough	5-7, 6-4, 6-4
1947	Buenos Aires	(United States) Pat Canning Todd	(United States) Doris Hart	6-3, 6-4
1948	Buenos Aires	(United States) Pat Canning Todd (2)	(Argentina) Mary Terán de Weiss	7-5, 6-4
1949 (Note: The 1949 South American Championship 4th edition organised by the South American Tennis Confederation (SATA) and was held at the Buenos Aires Lawn Tennis Club and was also valid as the 21st Argentina International Championships.)	Buenos Aires	(United States) Barbara Scofield	(United States) Nancy Chaffee	6-3, 6-2
1950 (Note: The 1950 South American Championship 5th edition organised by (SATA)and was held at the Buenos Aires Lawn Tennis Club and was also valid as the 22nd Argentina International Championships.)	Buenos Aires	(Argentina) Felisa Piedrola de Zappa	(Argentina) Elena Lehmann	6-4, 3-6, 6-3
1951	Buenos Aires	(Argentina) Elena Lehmann	(Argentina) Felisa Piedrola de Zappa	6-4, 3-6, 6-4
1952	women's event not held			
1953	Santiago	(West Germany) Edda Buding	(Argentina) Julia Borzone	7-5, 6-3
1954	Buenos Aires	(Italy) Silvana Lazzarino	(West Germany) Edda Buding	8-6, 6-2
1955	Buenos Aires	(Brazil) Ingrid Metzner	(Argentina) June Hanson	6-1, 6-4
1956 (Note: The 1956 South American Championship 10th edition organised by (SATA)and was held Santiago, Chile and was also valid as the Chile National Championships.)	Santiago	(Argentina) Nora Bonifacino de Somoza	(Argentina) June Hanson	6-4, 6-0
1957	Buenos Aires	(Argentina) June Hanson	(Argentina) Nora Bonifacino de Somoza	6-1, 6-1
1958	Buenos Aires	(United Kingdom) Shirley Bloomer	(Australia) Margaret Hellyer	2-6, 6-2, 12-10
1959	Buenos Aires	(Argentina) Nora Bonifacino de Somoza (2)	(Argentina) Norma Baylon	6-3, 5-7, divided
1960	Buenos Aires	(Argentina) Nora Bonifacino de Somoza (3)	(Argentina) Mabel Bove	7-5, 6-4
1961	Buenos Aires	(Mexico) Yola Ramírez	(United States) Darlene Hard	6-1, 6-2
1962	Buenos Aires	(Argentina) Norma Baylon	(Czechoslovakia) Vera Puzejova Sukova	5-7, 6-4, 6-3
1963	Buenos Aires	(Czechoslovakia) Vera Puzejova Sukova	(Argentina) Norma Baylon	6-2, 6-4
1964	Buenos Aires	(United States) Nancy Richey	(Brazil) Maria Bueno	4-6, 6-2, 6-4
1965	Buenos Aires	(United States) Nancy Richey (2)	(Argentina) Norma Baylon	6-2, 6-4
1966	Buenos Aires	(Argentina) Norma Baylon (3)	(United States) Nancy Richey	6-3, 7-9, 6-4
1967	Buenos Aires	(United States) Billie Jean Moffitt King	(United States) Rosie Casals	6-3, 3-6, 6-2
South American Open Championships / South American Open
1968	Buenos Aires	(United Kingdom) Ann Haydon Jones	(United States) Nancy Richey	walkover
↓ Open era ↓
1969	Buenos Aires	(West Germany) Helga Niessen	(United States) Rosie Casals	1-6, 6-4, 6-2
1970	Buenos Aires	(Argentina) Beatriz Araujo	(Argentina) Raquel Giscafré	6-4, 6-4
1971	Buenos Aires	(West Germany) Helga Niessen Masthoff (2)	(West Germany) Heide Orth	6-1, 7-5
1972 (Note: The 1972 South American Championship 27th edition organised by (SATA)and was held in Guayaquil, Ecuador and was also valid as the Ecuadorian National Championships.)	Guayaquil	(United Kingdom) Virginia Wade	(Uruguay) Fiorella Bonicelli	6-4, 6-1
1973	Buenos Aires	(United States) Julie Heldman	(Uruguay) Fiorella Bonicelli	6-3, 6-1
1974	Buenos Aires	(Argentina) Raquel Giscafré	(Argentina) Beatriz Araujo	7-6, 1-6, 6-2
1975	Buenos Aires	(Argentina) Raquel Giscafré (2)	(United States) Kristien Shaw	6-2, 6-4
1976	Buenos Aires	(United States) Laura duPont	(Argentina) Beatriz Araujo	6-1, 6-2
1977	Buenos Aires	(Brazil) Patricia Medrado	(Argentina) Ivanna Madruga	6-1, 3-6, 6-4
1978	women's event not held			
1979	Buenos Aires	(Argentina) Ivanna Madruga	(Czechoslovakia) Hana Strachonova	6-1, 6-3
1980	Buenos Aires	(Argentina) Ivanna Madruga (2)	(Argentina) Liliana Giussani	6-3, 2-6, 6-2
1981	women's event not held			
