= Jaime Pinto Bravo =

Chilean tennis player

Jaime Pinto
- Full name: Jaime René Pinto Bravo
- Country (sports): Chile
- Residence: Santiago, Chile
- Born: 9 October 1939 (age 86) Chile
- Height: 1.78 m (5 ft 10 in)
- Plays: Right-handed

Singles
- Career record: 66–117
- Career titles: 1
- Highest ranking: No. 73 (23 August 1973)

Grand Slam singles results
- French Open: 3R (1971)
- Wimbledon: 2R (1973)
- US Open: 2R (1969)

Doubles
- Career record: 34–82
- Career titles: 0
- Highest ranking: No. 581 (2 January 1973)

Grand Slam doubles results
- French Open: 3R (1970)
- Wimbledon: 2R (1970)
- US Open: 1R (1969, 1972, 1974)

Jaime René Pinto Bravo (born 9 October 1939) is a retired professional tennis player from Chile. He reached his career-high singles ranking of world No. 73 in August 1973.

== Life ==
Jaime Pinto Bravo was born in Chile and he played in Davis Cup for Chile. His daughter Anita Pinto is a professional squash player.

== Grand Prix career finals ==
=== Doubles (1 runner-up) ===
Result	W/L	Date	Tournament	Surface	Partner	Opponents	Score
Loss	0–1	Mar 1973	Jackson, US	Hard	(Argentina) Tito Vázquez	(United States) Zan Guerry (South Africa) Frew McMillan	2–6, 4–6
