= Željko Franulović =

Croatian tennis player

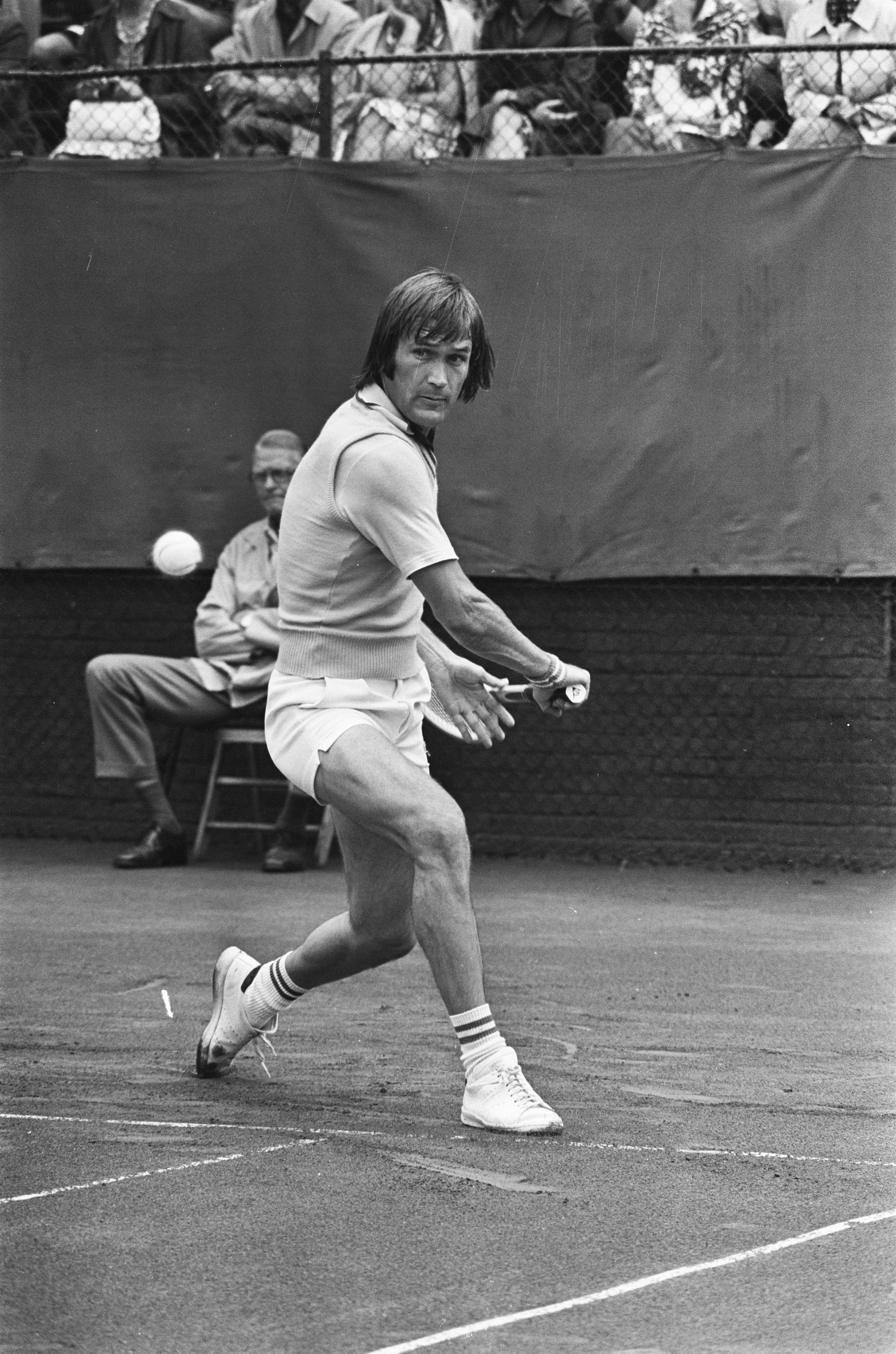
- Franulović at the Dutch Open in Hilversum in July 1975.
- Country (sports): Yugoslavia
- Residence: Split, Croatia
- Born: 13 June 1947 (age 79) Korčula, PR Croatia, FPR Yugoslavia
- Turned pro: 1969 (amateur from 1963)
- Retired: 1980
- Plays: Right-handed (one-handed backhand)

Singles
- Career record: 543–401
- Career titles: 13
- Highest ranking: No. 3 (1 March 1971)

Grand Slam singles results
- French Open: F (1970)
- Wimbledon: 3R (1970)
- US Open: 3R (1975, 1976, 1977)

Other tournaments
- Tour Finals: RR (1970, 1971)

Doubles
- Career record: 190–203
- Career titles: 7
- Highest ranking: No. 312 (3 January 1983)

Željko Franulović (Croatian pronunciation: [ʒêːʎko franǔːloʋitɕ]; born 13 June 1947) is a Croatian former tennis player who competed for SFR Yugoslavia and has since had a long career in tennis management. He has been the Monte-Carlo Masters tournament director since 2005.

Whilst his career-high ATP singles ranking was world No. 3, the ATP rankings were installed after his 1969–1971 heyday – Franulović was ranked inside the top 20 in both 1970 and 1971, reaching as high as world No. 3 in March 1971. Finalist of the 1970 French Open and winner in Monte Carlo the same year. His singles career lasted 20 years from 1963 to 1983 in which he won 23 career titles.

== Biography ==
Franulović was born on the island of Korčula to father Ivo and mother Katica, but at the age of one month got brought to Split where he grew up. His playing career lasted for 20 years between 1963 and 1983, during which he won a total of twenty three singles titles, as well as seven doubles titles. He played his first singles tournament at the 1963 Yugoslavian International Championships. In 1967 he won his first title at the same event.

He is remembered for reaching the French Open final in 1970, which he lost to Czech Jan Kodeš in straight sets. He reached the semifinals the following year. He also won the Monte-Carlo Masters in 1970. He won his final singles title in 1982 at the San Benedetto Open in Italy. He played his final tournament at the ATP Essen Challenger event in 1983.

Since retiring from playing tennis, Franulović became involved in the ATP since the 1990s. He was the coach of the Croatian Davis Cup Team from 1994 to 1997. He was the Tournament Representative for Europe on the Association of Tennis Professionals' Board of Directors, between 2007 and 2009.

== Grand Slam finals ==
=== Singles: 1 (1 runner-up) ===
| Result | Year | Championship | Surface | Opponent | Score |
|---|---|---|---|---|---|
| Loss | 1970 | French Open | Clay | (Czechoslovakia) Jan Kodeš | 2–6, 4–6, 0–6 |

== Grand Slam singles performance timeline ==
Key
| W | F | SF | QF | #R | RR | Q# | DNQ | A | NH |

(W) winner; (F) finalist; (SF) semifinalist; (QF) quarterfinalist; (#R) rounds 4, 3, 2, 1; (RR) round-robin stage; (Q#) qualification round; (DNQ) did not qualify; (A) absent; (NH) not held; (SR) strike rate (events won / competed); (W–L) win–loss record.

| Tournament | 1966 | 1967 | 1968 | 1969 | 1970 | 1971 | 1972 | 1973 | 1974 | 1975 | 1976 | 1977 | | 1978 | 1979 | 1980 | 1981 | 1982 | 1983 | SR |
|---|---|---|---|---|---|---|---|---|---|---|---|---|---|---|---|---|---|---|---|---|
| Australian Open | A | A | A | A | A | A | A | A | A | A | A | A | A | A | A | A | A | A | A | 0 / 0 |
| French Open | 1R | 1R | 4R | QF | F | SF | 1R | 2R | 3R | 3R | A | 1R | | 2R | 1R | 1R | 1R | A | 1R | 0 / 16 |
| Wimbledon | Q1 | 1R | A | 2R | 3R | 2R | A | A | A | A | 2R | A | | A | A | A | A | A | A | 0 / 5 |
| US Open | A | A | 1R | 1R | A | 2R | A | A | A | 3R | 3R | 3R | | A | A | A | A | A | A | 0 / 6 |
| Strike rate | 0 / 1 | 0 / 2 | 0 / 2 | 0 / 3 | 0 / 2 | 0 / 3 | 0 / 1 | 0 / 1 | 0 / 1 | 0 / 2 | 0 / 2 | 0 / 2 | | 0 / 1 | 0 / 1 | 0 / 1 | 0 / 1 | 0 / 0 | 0 / 1 | 0 / 27 |

Note: The Australian Open was held twice in 1977, in January and December.

== Career finals ==
=== Singles: 19 (13 titles / 6 runner-ups) ===
| Result | W/L | Date | Tournament | Surface | Opponent | Score |
|---|---|---|---|---|---|---|
| Win | 1–0 | Mar 1969 | St. Petersburg, U.S. | Clay | (Chile) Jaime Fillol | 6–4, 6–2, 6–4 |
| Win | 2–0 | Apr 1969 | Houston, U.S. | Clay | (Mexico) Rafael Osuna | 7–5, 6–3, 6–2 |
| Win | 3–0 | Jul 1969 | Indianapolis, U.S. | Clay | (United States) Arthur Ashe | 8–6, 6–3, 6–4 |
| Loss | 3–1 | May 1969 | Brussels, Belgium | Clay | (Netherlands) Tom Okker | 4–6, 6–1, 2–6, 2–6 |
| Loss | 3–2 | Nov 1969 | Buenos Aires, Argentina | Clay | (France) François Jauffret | 6–3, 2–6, 4–6, 3–6 |
| Win | 4–2 | Mar 1970 | Barranquilla, Colombia | Clay | (Socialist Federal Republic of Yugoslavia) Nikola Špear | 9–7, 6–3, 6–3 |
| Win | 5–2 | Apr 1970 | Monte Carlo, Monaco | Clay | (Spain) Manuel Orantes | 6–4, 6–3, 6–3 |
| Loss | 5–3 | Jun 1970 | French Open | Clay | (Czechoslovakia) Jan Kodeš | 2–6, 4–6, 0–6 |
| Win | 6–3 | Aug 1970 | Kitzbühel, Austria | Clay | (Australia) John Alexander | 6–4, 9–7, 6–4 |
| Win | 7–3 | Nov 1970 | Buenos Aires, Argentina | Clay | (Spain) Manuel Orantes | 6–4, 6–2, 6–0 |
| Win | 8–3 | Feb 1971 | New York, U.S. | Carpet (i) | (United States) Clark Graebner | 6–2, 5–7, 6–4, 7–5 |
| Win | 9–3 | Mar 1971 | Macon, U.S. | Carpet (i) | (Romania) Ilie Năstase | 6–4, 7–5, 5–7, 3–6, 7–6^{(5–4)} |
| Loss | 9–4 | May 1971 | Bournemouth, U.K. | Clay | (United Kingdom) Gerald Battrick | 3–6, 2–6, 7–5, 0–6 |
| Loss | 9–5 | Jul 1971 | Clemmons, U.S. | Clay | (Chile) Jaime Fillol | 6–4, 4–6, 6–7 |
| Win | 10–5 | Aug 1971 | Indianapolis, U.S. | Clay | (United States) Cliff Richey | 6–3, 6–4, 0–6, 6–3 |
| Win | 11–5 | Dec 1971 | Buenos Aires, Argentina | Clay | (Romania) Ilie Năstase | 6–3, 7–6, 6–1 |
| Loss | 11–6 | Jul 1975 | Hilversum, Netherlands | Clay | (Argentina) Guillermo Vilas | 4–6, 7–6, 2–6, 3–6 |
| Win | 12–6 | Oct 1976 | Aviles, Spain | Clay | (Czechoslovakia) Jan Kodeš | 7–6, 6–1, 5–7, 7–6 |
| Win | 13–6 | May 1977 | Munich, West Germany | Clay | (Paraguay) Víctor Pecci | 6–1, 6–1, 6–7, 7–5 |

=== Doubles: 14 (7 titles / 7 runner-ups) ===
| Result | W/L | Date | Tournament | Surface | Partner | Opponents | Score |
|---|---|---|---|---|---|---|---|
| Loss | 0–1 | Jul 1970 | Båstad, Sweden | Clay | (Czechoslovakia) Jan Kodeš | (Australia) Dick Crealy (Australia) Allan Stone | 2–6, 6–2, 12–12 ret. |
| Loss | 0–2 | Aug 1970 | Kitzbühel, Austria | Clay | (Czechoslovakia) Jan Kodeš | (Australia) John Alexander (Australia) Phil Dent | 8–10, 2–6, 4–6 |
| Loss | 0–3 | Nov 1970 | Buenos Aires, Argentina | Clay | (Czechoslovakia) Jan Kodeš | (Australia) Bob Carmichael (Australia) Ray Ruffels | 5–7, 2–6, 7–5, 7–6, 3–6 |
| Loss | 0–4 | Mar 1971 | Macon, U.S. | Carpet (i) | (Czechoslovakia) Jan Kodeš | (United States) Clark Graebner (Brazil) Thomaz Koch | 3–6, 6–7 |
| Win | 1–4 | Aug 1971 | Indianapolis, U.S. | Clay | (Czechoslovakia) Jan Kodeš | (United States) Clark Graebner (United States) Erik van Dillen | 7–6, 5–7, 6–3 |
| Win | 2–4 | Oct 1971 | Barcelona WCT, Spain | Clay | (Spain) Juan Gisbert Sr. | (South Africa) Cliff Drysdale (Spain) Andrés Gimeno | 7–6, 6–2, 7–6 |
| Win | 3–4 | Dec 1971 | Buenos Aires, Argentina | Clay | (Romania) Ilie Năstase | (Chile) Patricio Cornejo (Chile) Jaime Fillol | 6–4, 6–4 |
| Win | 4–4 | Mar 1974 | Hampton, U.S. | Carpet (i) | (Socialist Federal Republic of Yugoslavia) Nikola Pilić | (South Africa) Pat Cramer (United States) Mike Estep | 6–3, 1–2, retired |
| Loss | 4–5 | Jul 1975 | Hilversum, Netherlands | Clay | (United Kingdom) John Lloyd | (Poland) Wojciech Fibak (Argentina) Guillermo Vilas | 4–6, 3–6 |
| Loss | 4–6 | Jun 1978 | Berlin, West Germany | Clay | (Chile) Hans Gildemeister | (Switzerland) Colin Dowdeswell (West Germany) Jürgen Fassbender | 3–6, 4–6 |
| Loss | 4–7 | Oct 1978 | Tokyo, Japan | Clay | (United Kingdom) Buster Mottram | (Australia) Geoff Masters (Australia) Ross Case | 2–6, 6–4, 1–6 |
| Win | 5–7 | Oct 1978 | Barcelona, Spain | Clay | (Chile) Hans Gildemeister | (France) Jean-Louis Haillet (France) Gilles Moretton | 6–1, 6–4 |
| Win | 6–7 | Jul 1979 | Kitzbühel, Austria | Clay | (Switzerland) Heinz Günthardt | (Australia) Dick Crealy (Italy) Antonio Zugarelli | 6–2, 6–4 |
| Win | 7–7 | Sep 1980 | Geneva, Switzerland | Clay | (Hungary) Balázs Taróczy | (Switzerland) Heinz Günthardt (Switzerland) Markus Günthardt | 6–4, 4–6, 6–4 |

== Orders ==
- Order of Saint-Charles Knight
