= Patricio Cornejo =

Chilean tennis player

- Country (sports): Chile
- Residence: Santiago, Chile
- Born: 6 June 1944 (age 82) Llolleo, Chile
- Height: 1.80 m (5 ft 11 in)
- Retired: 1983
- Plays: Right-handed (one-handed backhand)

Singles
- Career record: 104–184
- Career titles: 0
- Highest ranking: No. 65 (4 September 1974)

Grand Slam singles results
- French Open: QF (1974)
- Wimbledon: 2R (1967)
- US Open: 3R (1972)

Doubles
- Career record: 227–165
- Career titles: 8

Grand Slam doubles results
- French Open: F (1972)
- Wimbledon: SF (1972)
- US Open: F (1974)

Mixed doubles
- Career record: 10–7
- Career titles: 0

Grand Slam mixed doubles results
- French Open: QF (1975)
- Wimbledon: QF (1972)
- US Open: 2R (1970, 1972)

Team competitions
- Davis Cup: F (1976)

Patricio Cornejo Seckel (Spanish pronunciation: [paˈtɾisjo koɾˈnexo]; born 6 June 1944) is a retired Chilean professional tennis player of the 1970s. He competed at the 1975 Davis Cup with Jaime Fillol and played the longest Davis Cup rubber in terms of games, eventually losing to Stan Smith/Erik van Dillen from the US team 9–7, 39–37, 6–8, 1–6, 3–6 in the 1973 American Zone Final. The second set is the world record for the most games in a Davis Cup set.

Cornejo retired from professional tennis in 1983 but still continues to play socially and in charity tournaments.

== Career finals ==
=== Doubles: 18 (8 titles / 10 runner-ups) ===
Result	W/L	Date	Tournament	Surface	Partner	Opponents	Score
Win	1–0	Nov 1969	Buenos Aires, Argentina	Clay	(Chile) Jaime Fillol	(Australia) Roy Emerson (South Africa) Frew McMillan	w.o.
Win	2–0	Sep 1970	South Orange, US	Hard	(Chile) Jaime Fillol	(Spain) Andrés Gimeno (Australia) Rod Laver	3–6, 7–6, 7–6
Loss	2–1	May 1971	Bournemouth, England	Clay	(Chile) Jaime Fillol	(Australia) Bill Bowrey (Australia) Owen Davidson	6–8, 2–6, 6–3, 6–4, 3–6
Loss	2–2	Dec 1971	Buenos Aires, Argentina	Clay	(Chile) Jaime Fillol	(Socialist Federal Republic of Yugoslavia) Željko Franulović (Romania) Ilie Năstase	4–6, 4–6
Win	3–2	Mar 1972	Caracas, Venezuela	Hard	(Chile) Jaime Fillol	(United States) Jim McManus (Spain) Manuel Orantes	6–4, 6–3, 7–6
Loss	3–3	May 1972	Brussels, Belgium	Clay	(Chile) Jaime Fillol	(Spain) Juan Gisbert (Spain) Manuel Orantes	7–9, 3–6
Loss	3–4	Jun 1972	French Open, Paris	Clay	(Chile) Jaime Fillol	(South Africa) Bob Hewitt (South Africa) Frew McMillan	3–6, 6–8, 6–3, 1–6
Loss	3–5	Aug 1972	Indianapolis, US	Clay	(Chile) Jaime Fillol	(South Africa) Bob Hewitt (South Africa) Frew McMillan	2–6, 3–6
Loss	3–6	Nov 1973	Buenos Aires, Argentina	Clay	(Colombia) Iván Molina	(Argentina) Ricardo Cano (Argentina) Guillermo Vilas	6–7, 3–6
Loss	3–7	Jul 1974	Washington D.C., US	Clay	(Chile) Jaime Fillol	(United States) Tom Gorman (United States) Marty Riessen	5–7, 1–6
Loss	3–8	Sep 1974	US Open, New York	Grass	(Chile) Jaime Fillol	(United States) Bob Lutz (United States) Stan Smith	3–6, 3–6
Loss	3–9	Nov 1974	Buenos Aires, Argentina	Clay	(Chile) Jaime Fillol	(Spain) Manuel Orantes (Argentina) Guillermo Vilas	4–6, 3–6
Win	4–9	Apr 1975	Charlotte, US	Clay	(Chile) Jaime Fillol	(Egypt) Ismail El Shafei (New Zealand) Brian Fairlie	6–3, 5–7, 6–4
Win	5–9	Jun 1976	West-Berlin, Germany	Hard	(Spain) Antonio Muñoz	(West Germany) Jürgen Fassbender (West Germany) Hans-Jürgen Pohmann	7–5, 6–1
Win	6–9	Dec 1976	Santiago, Chile	Clay	(Chile) Hans Gildemeister	(Argentina) Lito Álvarez (Chile) Belus Prajoux	6–3, 7–6
Loss	6–10	Apr 1977	Murcia, Spain	Clay	(Chile) Hans Gildemeister	(France) Patrice Dominguez (France) François Jauffret	5–7, 2–6
Win	7–10	Aug 1977	Indianapolis, US	Clay	(Chile) Jaime Fillol	(Australia) Dick Crealy (Australia) Cliff Letcher	6–7, 6–4, 6–3
Win	8–10	Nov 1977	Santiago, Chile	Clay	(Chile) Jaime Fillol	(United States) Henry Bunis (Australia) Paul McNamee	5–7, 6–1, 6–1
