= 1993 Acura U.S. Hardcourts – Singles =

Singles
- 1993 Acura U.S. Hardcourts

Final
- Champion: (Spain) Conchita Martínez
- Runner-up: (United States) Zina Garrison-Jackson
- Score: 6–3, 6–2

Details
- Draw: 56 (3WC)
- Seeds: 16

Events
Singles	Doubles
- Connecticut Open

Martina Navratilova was the defending champion, but did not compete this year.

Conchita Martínez won the title by defeating Zina Garrison-Jackson 6–3, 6–2 in the final.

== Seeds ==
The first eight seeds received a bye to the second round.

1. (Spain) Conchita Martínez (champion)
2. (United States) ~~Mary Joe Fernandez~~ (withdrew)
3. (Czech Republic) Helena Suková (quarterfinals)
4. (Switzerland) Manuela Maleeva-Fragnière (semifinals)
5. (United States) Zina Garrison-Jackson (final)
6. (United States) Chanda Rubin (second round)
7. (United States) Lisa Raymond (second round)
8. (United States) Tami Whitlinger (quarterfinals)
9. (United States) Kathy Rinaldi (third round)
10. (United States) Caroline Kuhlman (third round)
11. (Australia) Elizabeth Smylie (first round)
12. (Germany) Claudia Porwik (quarterfinals)
13. (United Kingdom) Clare Wood (first round)
14. (Greece) Christína Papadáki (second round)
15. (Germany) Christina Singer (second round)
16. (Hungary) Andrea Temesvári (first round, retired)

== Draw ==
Key

- Q = Qualifier
- WC = Wild card
- LL = Lucky loser
- Alt = Alternate
- ITF = ITF entry
- PR = Protected ranking
- SR = Special ranking
- SE = Special exempt
- JE = Junior exempt
- JR = Junior Accelerator Programme entrant
- CO = College Accelerator Programme entrant
- NG = Next Gen Accelerator Program entrant
- w/o = Walkover
- r = Retired
- d = Defaulted

=== Finals ===
Quarterfinals
1	(Spain) Conchita Martínez	6	6
(United States) Jolene Watanabe	4	1
4	(Switzerland) Manuela Maleeva-Fragnière	5	6	6
8	(United States) Tami Whitlinger	7	4	1
(Austria) Beate Reinstadler	7^{7}	6
3	(Czech Republic) Helena Suková	6^{3}	3
5	(United States) Zina Garrison-Jackson	6	7^{8}
12	(Germany) Claudia Porwik	3	6^{6}

Semifinals
1	(Spain) Conchita Martínez	6	6
4	(Switzerland) Manuela Maleeva-Fragnière	1	2
(Austria) Beate Reinstadler	6	5	4
5	(United States) Zina Garrison-Jackson	2	7	6

Final
1	(Spain) Conchita Martínez	6	6
5	(United States) Zina Garrison-Jackson	3	2

=== Top half ===
==== Section 1 ====
First round
(United States) C Benjamin	7	6
(Canada) J Hetherington	5	4
(United States) J Ingram	6	6
(United States) T Whittington	1	2
(United States) E Burgin	3	1
15	(Germany) C Singer	6	6
11	(Australia) E Smylie	4	5
(Spain) C Torrens Valero	6	7
(United States) J Watanabe	6	6
(United Kingdom) M Javer	3	0
(Australia) L Field	2	7	6^{2}
(Germany) S Lohrmann	6	5	7^{7}

Second round
1	(Spain) C Martínez	6	6
(United States) C Benjamin	0	3
(United States) J Ingram	6	7
15	(Germany) C Singer	3	5
(Spain) C Torrens Valero	4	2
(United States) J Watanabe	6	6
(Germany) S Lohrmann	5	6	6
6	(United States) C Rubin	7	3	3

Third round
1	(Spain) C Martínez	6	6
(United States) J Ingram	1	1
(United States) J Watanabe	6	6
(Germany) S Lohrmann	1	3

Quarterfinals
1	(Spain) C Martínez	6	6
(United States) J Watanabe	4	1

==== Section 2 ====
First round
(United States) L Glitz	2	1
(United States) A Mall	6	6
(France) I Demongeot	3	6	6
(United States) S Martin	6	1	0
(United States) A Henricksson	6	6
13	(United Kingdom) C Wood	3	1
10	(United States) C Kuhlman	6	7^{7}
(Germany) C Schneider	2	6^{5}
(Australia) D Jones	6	0	3
(United States) M Jackson-Nobrega	3	6	6
(Canada) J Nejedly	2	1
(United States) S McCarthy	6	6

Second round
4	(Switzerland) M Maleeva-Fragnière	6	6
(United States) A Mall	0	2
(France) I Demongeot	2	3
(United States) A Henricksson	6	6
10	(United States) C Kuhlman	6	7^{9}
(United States) M Jackson-Nobrega	3	6^{7}
(United States) S McCarthy	2	4
8	(United States) T Whitlinger	6	6

Third round
4	(Switzerland) M Maleeva-Fragnière	6	2	6
(United States) A Henricksson	3	6	0
10	(United States) C Kuhlman	3	2
8	(United States) T Whitlinger	6	6

Quarterfinals
4	(Switzerland) M Maleeva-Fragnière	5	6	6
8	(United States) T Whitlinger	7	4	1

=== Bottom half ===
==== Section 3 ====
First round
(Austria) B Reinstadler	6	7
(United States) E Rossides	2	5
(Mexico) L Novelo	6	7^{7}
(United Kingdom) V Lake	1	6^{1}
(Argentina) M Paz	6
16	(Hungary) A Temesvári	2	r
9	(United States) K Rinaldi	6	6
WC	(United States) A Basica	3	3
WC	(United States) R Jensen	1	4
(Japan) M Kidowaki	6	6
(Netherlands) C Bakkum	1	1
(Australia) T Morton	6	6

Second round
7	(United States) L Raymond	6	6^{4}	4
(Austria) B Reinstadler	4	7^{7}	6
(Mexico) L Novelo	1	0
(Argentina) M Paz	6	6
9	(United States) K Rinaldi	6	6
(Japan) M Kidowaki	2	1
(Australia) T Morton	2	2
3	(Czechoslovakia) H Suková	6	6

Third round
(Austria) B Reinstadler	5	6	6
(Argentina) M Paz	7	2	1
9	(United States) K Rinaldi	6	6^{5}	1
3	(Czechoslovakia) H Suková	3	7^{7}	6

Quarterfinals
(Austria) B Reinstadler	7^{7}	6
3	(Czechoslovakia) H Suková	6^{3}	3

==== Section 4 ====
First round
(United States) J Santrock	6	6
(Sri Lanka) Lihini Weerasuriya	1	2
(United States) B Bowes	6	6
(Germany) R Kochta	1	1
(United Kingdom) J Salmon	1	6^{4}
14	(Greece) C Papadáki	6	7^{7}
12	(Germany) C Porwik	6	6
(United States) J Shiflet	4	2
(United States) P O'Reilly	4	4
(Netherlands) S Noorlander	6	6
(United States) A Schwartz	7	7
WC	(United States) N London	5	5

Second round
5	(United States) Z Garrison-Jackson	6	6
(United States) J Santrock	1	2
(United States) B Bowes	6	1	6
14	(Greece) C Papadáki	0	6	2
12	(Germany) C Porwik	6	6
(Netherlands) S Noorlander	3	1
(United States) A Schwartz	1	0
(United States) A Stephenson	6	6

Third round
5	(United States) Z Garrison-Jackson	6	6
(United States) B Bowes	2	1
12	(Germany) C Porwik	6	6
(United States) A Stephenson	3	4

Quarterfinals
5	(United States) Z Garrison-Jackson	6	7^{8}
12	(Germany) C Porwik	3	6^{6}
