= 1988 Virginia Slims of Washington – Doubles =

Doubles
- 1988 Virginia Slims of Washington
- 1987 Champions: (United States) Elise Burgin (United States) Pam Shriver

Final
- Champions: (United States) Martina Navratilova (United States) Pam Shriver
- Runners-up: (Argentina) Gabriela Sabatini (Czechoslovakia) Helena Suková
- Score: 6–3, 6–4

Events
Singles	Doubles
← 1987 ·	Virginia Slims of Washington	· 1989 →

Elise Burgin and Pam Shriver were the defending champions but they competed with different partners that year, Burgin with Robin White and Shriver with Martina Navratilova.

Burgin and White lost in the quarterfinals to Larisa Savchenko and Natasha Zvereva.

Navratilova and Shriver won in the final 6–3, 6–4 against Gabriela Sabatini and Helena Suková.

== Seeds ==
Champion seeds are indicated in bold text while text in italics indicates the round in which those seeds were eliminated.

1. (United States) **Martina Navratilova** / (United States) **Pam Shriver (champions)**
2. (Argentina) Gabriela Sabatini / (Czechoslovakia) Helena Suková (quarterfinals)
3. (United States) Zina Garrison / (United States) Gigi Fernández (first round)
4. (United States) Elise Burgin / (United States) Robin White (quarterfinals)

== Draw ==
=== Key ===
- Q = Qualifier
- WC = Wild card
- LL = Lucky loser
- Alt = Alternate
- SE = Special exempt
- PR = Protected ranking
- ITF = ITF entry
- JE = Junior exempt
- w/o = Walkover
- r = Retired
- d = Defaulted
- SR = Special ranking

First round
1	(United States) **M Navratilova** (United States) **P Shriver**	**6**	**6**
(United States) A Henricksson (United States) W White	1	3
(Soviet Union) **N Bykova** (Soviet Union) **L Meskhi**	**7**	**6**
(United States) T Phelps (United States) S Rehe	5	2
3	(United States) Z Garrison (United States) G Fernández	4	**6**	2
(United States) **M L Daniels** (United States) **A M Fernandez**	**6**	2	**6**
(United States) L Bonder (United States) K Keil	2	1
(United States) **L Antonoplis** (United States) **B Gerken**	**6**	**6**
(Soviet Union) **L Savchenko** (Soviet Union) **N Zvereva**	**7**	**6**
(West Germany) E Pfaff (Australia) W Turnbull	6	1
(France) I Demongeot (France) N Tauziat	3	4
4	(United States) **E Burgin** (United States) **R White**	**6**	**6**
(Australia) **N Provis** (Austria) **J Wiesner**	**6**	**6**
(United States) J Goodling (United States) J Ingram	1	1
(United States) P Harper (United States) H Ludloff	0	0
2	(Argentina) **G Sabatini** (Czechoslovakia) **H Suková**	**6**	**6**

Quarterfinals
1	(United States) **M Navratilova** (United States) **P Shriver**	**6**	**6**
(Soviet Union) N Bykova (Soviet Union) L Meskhi	1	2
(United States) **M L Daniels** (United States) **A M Fernandez**	**6**	2	**7**
(United States) L Antonoplis (United States) B Gerken	3	**6**	6
(Soviet Union) **L Savchenko** (Soviet Union) **N Zvereva**	**6**	**6**
4	(United States) E Burgin (United States) R White	**6**	**6**
(Australia) N Provis (Austria) J Wiesner	2	0
2	(Argentina) **G Sabatini** (Czechoslovakia) **H Suková**	**6**	**6**

Semifinals
1	(United States) **M Navratilova** (United States) **P Shriver**	**6**	**6**
(United States) M L Daniels (United States) A M Fernandez	3	0
(Soviet Union) L Savchenko (Soviet Union) N Zvereva	4	2
2	(Argentina) **G Sabatini** (Czechoslovakia) **H Suková**	**6**	**6**

Final
(United States) **Martina Navratilova** (United States) **Pam Shriver**	**6**	**6**
2	(Argentina) Gabriela Sabatini (Czechoslovakia) Helena Suková	3	4
