= 1993 Acura U.S. Hardcourts – Doubles =

Doubles
- 1993 Acura U.S. Hardcourts

Final
- Champions: (Australia) Elizabeth Smylie (United States) Zina Garrison-Jackson
- Runners-up: (Switzerland) Manuela Maleeva-Fragnière (Argentina) Mercedes Paz
- Score: 6–1, 6–2

Details
- Draw: 28 (2WC/1Q)
- Seeds: 8

Events
Singles	Doubles
- Connecticut Open

Martina Navratilova and Pam Shriver were the defending champions, but none competed this year.

Elizabeth Smylie and Zina Garrison-Jackson won the title by defeating Manuela Maleeva-Fragnière and Mercedes Paz 6–1, 6–2 in the final.

== Seeds ==
The first four seeds received a bye to the second round.

1. (Australia) Elizabeth Smylie / (Czech Republic) Helena Suková (champions)
2. (United States) ~~Mary Joe Fernandez~~ / (United States) ~~Zina Garrison-Jackson~~ (withdrew)
3. (Canada) Jill Hetherington / (United States) Kathy Rinaldi (semifinals)
4. (Switzerland) Manuela Maleeva-Fragnière / (Argentina) Mercedes Paz (final)
5. (United States) Shannan McCarthy / (Australia) Kristine Radford (first round)
6. (Germany) Claudia Porwik / (Germany) Christina Singer (quarterfinals)
7. (United Kingdom) Valda Lake / (United Kingdom) Clare Wood (quarterfinals)
8. (Australia) Danielle Jones / (Japan) Maya Kidowaki (quarterfinals)

== Draw ==
Key

- Q = Qualifier
- WC = Wild card
- LL = Lucky loser
- Alt = Alternate
- ITF = ITF entry
- PR = Protected ranking
- SR = Special ranking
- SE = Special exempt
- JE = Junior exempt
- JR = Junior Accelerator Programme entrant
- CO = College Accelerator Programme entrant
- NG = Next Gen Accelerator Program entrant
- w/o = Walkover
- r = Retired
- d = Defaulted

=== Finals ===
Semifinals
1	(Australia) Elizabeth Smylie (Czech Republic) Helena Suková	6	7
3	(Canada) Jill Hetherington (United States) Kathy Rinaldi	4	5
4	(Switzerland) Manuela Maleeva-Fragnière (Argentina) Mercedes Paz	6
(United States) Elly Hakami (United States) Stephanie Reece	2	r

Final
1	(Australia) Elizabeth Smylie (Czech Republic) Helena Suková	6	6
4	(Switzerland) Manuela Maleeva-Fragnière (Argentina) Mercedes Paz	1	2

=== Top half ===
First round
(Canada) M Bernard (Canada) C Delisle	w/o
(Australia) L Pleming (Hungary) A Temesvári
(United States) L Glitz (United States) M Jackson-Nobrega	6	6
WC	(United States) Ra Jensen (United States) Re Jensen	3	4
WC	(United States) L Raymond (United States) C Rubin	6	6
5	(United States) S McCarthy (Australia) K Radford	2	3
(Germany) R Kochta (Germany) C Schneider	6	6
(United States) C Benjamin (United States) P O'Reilly	4	4
(United States) A Mall (United States) J Watanabe	6	2	4
(United States) A Henricksson (United States) J Santrock	2	6	6
(Greece) C Papadáki (United Kingdom) J Salmon	3	0
7	(United Kingdom) V Lake (United Kingdom) C Wood	6	6

Second round
1	(Australia) E Smylie (Czech Republic) H Suková	3	6	6
(Canada) M Bernard (Canada) C Delisle	6	3	3
(United States) L Glitz (United States) M Jackson-Nobrega	2	3
WC	(United States) L Raymond (United States) C Rubin	6	6
3	(Canada) J Hetherington (United States) K Rinaldi	6	6
(Germany) R Kochta (Germany) C Schneider	0	3
(United States) A Henricksson (United States) J Santrock	6	3	5
7	(United Kingdom) V Lake (United Kingdom) C Wood	2	6	7

Quarterfinals
1	(Australia) E Smylie (Czech Republic) H Suková	6	7^{7}
WC	(United States) L Raymond (United States) C Rubin	4	6^{3}
3	(Canada) J Hetherington (United States) K Rinaldi	7^{7}	7^{7}
7	(United Kingdom) V Lake (United Kingdom) C Wood	6^{3}	6^{4}

Semifinals
1	(Australia) E Smylie (Czech Republic) H Suková	6	7
3	(Canada) J Hetherington (United States) K Rinaldi	4	5

=== Bottom half ===
First round
8	(Australia) D Jones (Japan) M Kidowaki	6^{6}	6	6
(South Africa) R Gaddie (South Africa) Toni Gaddie	7^{8}	4	0
(United States) E Rossides (Austria) H Sprung	1	5
(Australia) L Field (Australia) T Morton	6	7
(United States) B Bowes (United States) T Whitlinger	7	6
(Netherlands) C Bakkum (Japan) H Nagano	5	4
6	(Germany) C Porwik (Germany) C Singer	6	6
Q	(United States) J Ingram (Sri Lanka) Lihini Weerasuriya	3	3
(Mexico) L Novelo (United States) T Whittington	4	5
(Slovakia) J Husárová (Austria) B Reinstadler	6	7
(Zimbabwe) P Iversen (United States) C Kuhlman	7^{7}	4	4
(United States) E Hakami (United States) S Reece	6^{3}	6	6

Second round
8	(Australia) D Jones (Japan) M Kidowaki	6	6
(Australia) L Field (Australia) T Morton	1	4
(United States) B Bowes (United States) T Whitlinger	6	3	6^{3}
4	(Switzerland) M Maleeva-Fragnière (Argentina) M Paz	2	6	7^{7}
6	(Germany) C Porwik (Germany) C Singer	6	6
(Slovakia) J Husárová (Austria) B Reinstadler	4	3
(United States) E Hakami (United States) S Reece	6	6
(Canada) J Nejedly (United States) J Shiflet	2	1

Quarterfinals
8	(Australia) D Jones (Japan) M Kidowaki	4	2
4	(Switzerland) M Maleeva-Fragnière (Argentina) M Paz	6	6
6	(Germany) C Porwik (Germany) C Singer	2	1
(United States) E Hakami (United States) S Reece	6	6

Semifinals
4	(Switzerland) M Maleeva-Fragnière (Argentina) M Paz	6
(United States) E Hakami (United States) S Reece	2	r
