= 1990 Virginia Slims of Washington – Singles =

Singles
- 1990 Virginia Slims of Washington

Final
- Champion: (United States) Martina Navratilova
- Runner-up: (United States) Zina Garrison
- Score: 6–1, 6–0

Details
- Draw: 28 (4WC/7Q)
- Seeds: 8

Events
Singles	Doubles
← 1989 ·	Virginia Slims of Washington	· 1991 →

Steffi Graf was the defending champion, but did not compete this year.

Martina Navratilova won the title by defeating Zina Garrison 6–1, 6–0 in the final.

== Seeds ==
The top four seeds received a bye to the second round.

1. (United States) Martina Navratilova (champion)
2. (United States) Zina Garrison (final)
3. (Socialist Federal Republic of Yugoslavia) Monica Seles (semifinals)
4. (Soviet Union) Natasha Zvereva (semifinals)
5. (Canada) Helen Kelesi (first round)
6. (Peru) Laura Gildemeister (second round)
7. (United States) Pam Shriver (quarterfinals)
8. (France) Nathalie Tauziat (quarterfinals)

== Draw ==
=== Key ===
- Q = Qualifier
- WC = Wild card
- LL = Lucky loser
- Alt = Alternate
- SE = Special exempt
- PR = Protected ranking
- ITF = ITF entry
- JE = Junior exempt
- w/o = Walkover
- r = Retired
- d = Defaulted
- SR = Special ranking

=== Finals ===
Semifinals
1	(United States) Martina Navratilova	6	6
3	(Socialist Federal Republic of Yugoslavia) Monica Seles	3	0
4	(Soviet Union) Natasha Zvereva	2	6	3
2	(United States) Zina Garrison	6	3	6

Final
1	(United States) Martina Navratilova	6	6
2	(United States) Zina Garrison	1	0

=== Top half ===
First round
(South Africa) R Fairbank	6	2	6^{5}
(United States) A Grossman	3	6	7^{7}
(West Germany) C Kohde-Kilsch	6	4	6
(South Africa) D Van Rensburg	1	6	3
(United States) A Smith	6	6
5	(Canada) H Kelesi	1	2
(United States) K Adams	6^{2}	6	5
(United States) S Martin	7^{7}	4	7
(United States) P Fendick	6	6
(United States) A Henricksson	2	1
(United States) E Burgin	0	2
7	(United States) P Shriver	6	6

Second round
1	(United States) M Navratilova	6	6
(United States) A Grossman	0	0
(West Germany) C Kohde-Kilsch	3	3
(United States) A Smith	6	6
3	(Socialist Federal Republic of Yugoslavia) M Seles	w/o
(United States) S Martin
(United States) P Fendick	3	6	4
7	(United States) P Shriver	6	3	6

Quarterfinals
1	(United States) M Navratilova	6	6
(United States) A Smith	4	2
3	(Socialist Federal Republic of Yugoslavia) M Seles	6	7^{7}
7	(United States) P Shriver	2	6^{5}

Semifinals
1	(United States) M Navratilova	6	6
3	(Socialist Federal Republic of Yugoslavia) M Seles	3	0

=== Bottom half ===
First round
6	(Peru) L Gildemeister	4	6	6
(West Germany) S Hanika	6	4	2
(Australia) N Provis	6	7^{7}
(Hungary) A Temesvári	3	6^{1}
(United States) H Cioffi	6	6
WC	(United States) J Ingram	3	3
8	(France) N Tauziat	7	6
(United States) K Rinaldi	5	3
WC	(United States) E Rossides	0	3
(Italy) L Ferrando	6	6
(United States) L McNeil	2	6	6^{6}
(Australia) E Smylie	6	4	7^{8}

Second round
6	(Peru) L Gildemeister	3	3
(Australia) N Provis	6	6
(United States) H Cioffi	6	2	3
4	(Soviet Union) N Zvereva	4	6	6
8	(France) N Tauziat	6	6
(Italy) L Ferrando	2	4
(Australia) E Smylie	0	1
2	(United States) Z Garrison	6	6

Quarterfinals
(Australia) N Provis	7	3	4
4	(Soviet Union) N Zvereva	5	6	6
8	(France) N Tauziat	0	6^{4}
2	(United States) Z Garrison	6	7^{7}

Semifinals
4	(Soviet Union) N Zvereva	2	6	3
2	(United States) Z Garrison	6	3	6
