= 1991 Virginia Slims of Washington – Doubles =

Doubles
- 1991 Virginia Slims of Washington

Final
- Champions: (Czechoslovakia) Jana Novotná (Soviet Union) Larisa Savchenko
- Runners-up: (United States) Gigi Fernández (Soviet Union) Natasha Zvereva
- Score: 5–7, 6–1, 7–6^{(12–10)}

Details
- Draw: 16 (1WC)
- Seeds: 4

Events
Singles	Doubles
← 1990 ·	Virginia Slims of Washington

Zina Garrison and Martina Navratilova were the defending champions, but Navratilova did not compete this year. Garrison teamed up with Mary Joe Fernández and lost in the semifinals to Gigi Fernández and Natasha Zvereva.

Jana Novotná and Larisa Savchenko won the title by defeating Fernández and Zvereva 5–7, 6–1, 7–6^{(12–10)} in the final.

== Seeds ==
1. (United States) Gigi Fernández / (Soviet Union) Natasha Zvereva (final)
2. (Czechoslovakia) Jana Novotná / (Soviet Union) Larisa Savchenko (champions)
3. (United States) Mary Joe Fernández / (United States) Zina Garrison (semifinals)
4. (United States) Gretchen Magers / (United States) Robin White (first round)

== Draw ==
=== Key ===
- Q = Qualifier
- WC = Wild card
- LL = Lucky loser
- Alt = Alternate
- ITF = ITF entry
- PR = Protected ranking
- SR = Special ranking
- SE = Special exempt
- JE = Junior exempt
- JR = Junior Accelerator Programme entrant
- CO = College Accelerator Programme entrant
- NG = Next Gen Accelerator Program entrant
- w/o = Walkover
- r = Retired
- d = Defaulted

=== Draw ===
First round
1	(United States) G Fernández (Soviet Union) N Zvereva	6	6
(United States) J Goodling (United States) Sylvia Schenk	2	1
(Sweden) M Lindström (Sweden) C Lindqvist	2	3
(Bulgaria) M Maleeva (United States) P Shriver	6	6
3	(United States) MJ Fernández (United States) Z Garrison	4	6	6
(France) N Tauziat (Austria) J Wiesner	6	2	4
(United States) C Cunningham (Peru) L Gildemeister	4	2
(Australia) A Minter (United States) S Stafford	6	6
WC	(United States) J Ingram (United States) Allegra Milholland	1	1
(Czechoslovakia) R Rajchrtová (Czechoslovakia) R Zrubáková	6	6
(South Africa) M de Swardt (Czechoslovakia) A Strnadová	6	2	6
4	(United States) G Magers (United States) R White	3	6	3
(South Africa) R Fairbank-Nideffer (South Africa) L Gregory	2	5
(Bulgaria) K Maleeva (Soviet Union) L Meskhi	6	7
(Canada) J Hetherington (United States) K Rinaldi	1	1
2	(Czechoslovakia) J Novotná (Soviet Union) L Savchenko	6	6

Quarterfinals
1	(United States) G Fernández (Soviet Union) N Zvereva	6
(Bulgaria) M Maleeva (United States) P Shriver	3	r
3	(United States) MJ Fernández (United States) Z Garrison	6	6
(Australia) A Minter (United States) S Stafford	1	4
(Czechoslovakia) R Rajchrtová (Czechoslovakia) R Zrubáková	6^{2}	2
(South Africa) M de Swardt (Czechoslovakia) A Strnadová	7^{7}	6
(Bulgaria) K Maleeva (Soviet Union) L Meskhi	3	1
2	(Czechoslovakia) J Novotná (Soviet Union) L Savchenko	6	6

Semifinals
1	(United States) G Fernández (Soviet Union) N Zvereva	6	4	7^{7}
3	(United States) MJ Fernández (United States) Z Garrison	3	6	6^{4}
(South Africa) M de Swardt (Czechoslovakia) A Strnadová	6	1	4
2	(Czechoslovakia) J Novotná (Soviet Union) L Savchenko	3	6	6

Final
1	(United States) G Fernández (Soviet Union) N Zvereva	7	1	6^{10}
2	(Czechoslovakia) J Novotná (Soviet Union) L Savchenko	5	6	7^{12}
