= 1988 Virginia Slims of Washington – Singles =

Singles
- 1988 Virginia Slims of Washington
- 1987 Champion: (Czechoslovakia) Hana Mandlíková

Final
- Champion: (United States) Martina Navratilova
- Runner-up: (United States) Pam Shriver
- Score: 6–0, 6–2

Events
Singles	Doubles
← 1987 ·	Virginia Slims of Washington	· 1989 →

Hana Mandlíková was the defending champion but lost in the semifinals to Martina Navratilova.

Navratilova won in the final 6–0, 6–2 against Pam Shriver.

== Seeds ==
A champion seed is indicated in bold text while text in italics indicates the round in which that seed was eliminated.

1. (United States) **Martina Navratilova (champion)**
2. (United States) Pam Shriver (final)
3. (Argentina) Gabriela Sabatini (semifinals)
4. (Australia) Hana Mandlíková (semifinals)
5. (Czechoslovakia) Helena Suková (quarterfinals)
6. (United States) Zina Garrison (quarterfinals)
7. (United States) Barbara Potter (quarterfinals)
8. (Soviet Union) Natasha Zvereva (quarterfinals)

== Draw ==
=== Key ===
- Q = Qualifier
- WC = Wild card
- LL = Lucky loser
- Alt = Alternate
- SE = Special exempt
- PR = Protected ranking
- ITF = ITF entry
- JE = Junior exempt
- w/o = Walkover
- r = Retired
- d = Defaulted
- SR = Special ranking

First round
1	(United States) **M Navratilova**	**6**	**6**
(Austria) J Wiesner	2	3
(United States) H Ludloff	**7**	4	5
(United States) **G Fernández**	6	**6**	**7**
(United States) M L Daniels	4	**6**	3
(United States) **J Ingram**	**6**	1	**6**
(France) I Demongeot	2	0	r
6	(United States) **Z Garrison**	**6**	**5**
4	(Australia) **H Mandlíková**	**6**	**6**
(Australia) W Turnbull	3	2
(United States) P Harper	3	2
(United States) **T Phelps**	**6**	**6**
(United States) **R White**	**6**	**2**
(United States) A Henricksson	2	0	r
(United States) L Bonder	4	6
8	(Soviet Union) **N Zvereva**	**6**	**7**
7	(United States) **B Potter**	**6**	**6**
(Soviet Union) N Bykova	4	1
(Japan) A Kijimuta	6	6
(Soviet Union) **L Meskhi**	**7**	**7**
(United States) W White	4	6
(France) **N Tauziat**	**6**	**7**
(United States) K Kessaris	3	1
3	(Argentina) **G Sabatini**	**6**	**6**
5	(Czechoslovakia) **H Suková**	**6**	**6**
(United States) K Keil	1	0
(Soviet Union) **L Savchenko**	**6**	**6**
(United States) B Gerken	1	3
(United States) S Rehe	3	**6**	1
(West Germany) **S Hanika**	**6**	4	**6**
(Australia) N Provis	0	4
2	(United States) **P Shriver**	**6**	**6**

Second round
1	(United States) **M Navratilova**	**6**	**6**
(United States) G Fernández	3	1
(United States) J Ingram	0	2
6	(United States) **Z Garrison**	**6**	**6**
4	(Australia) **H Mandlíková**	**7**	**6**
(United States) T Phelps	2	0
(United States) R White	4	2
8	(Soviet Union) **N Zvereva**	**6**	**6**
7	(United States) **B Potter**	**7**	**6**
(Soviet Union) L Meskhi	6	0
(France) N Tauziat	1	6
3	(Argentina) **G Sabatini**	**6**	**7**
5	(Czechoslovakia) **H Suková**	**6**	**7**
(Soviet Union) L Savchenko	4	6
(West Germany) S Hanika	2	0
2	(United States) **P Shriver**	**6**	**6**

Quarterfinals
1	(United States) **M Navratilova**	**6**	**6**
6	(United States) Z Garrison	2	0
4	(Australia) **H Mandlíková**	5	**6**	**6**
8	(Soviet Union) N Zvereva	**7**	3	3
7	(United States) B Potter	3	2
3	(Argentina) **G Sabatini**	**6**	**6**
5	(Czechoslovakia) H Suková	2	5
2	(United States) **P Shriver**	**6**	**7**

Semifinals
1	(United States) **M Navratilova**	**6**	**6**
4	(Australia) H Mandlíková	4	2
3	(Argentina) G Sabatini	5	6
2	(United States) **P Shriver**	**7**	**7**

Final
1	(United States) **Martina Navratilova**	**6**	**6**
2	(United States) Pam Shriver	0	2
