= 1986 Virginia Slims of Washington =

- Date: January 6–13
- Edition: 15th
- Draw: 56S / 15D
- Prize money: $150,000
- Surface: Carpet / indoor
- Location: Washington, D.C., United States
- Venue: GWU Charles Smith Center

Champions

Singles
- (United States) Martina Navratilova

Doubles
- (United States) Martina Navratilova / (United States) Pam Shriver
← 1985 ·	Virginia Slims of Washington	· 1987 →

The 1986 Virginia Slims of Washington, also known as the VS of Washington, was a women's tennis tournament played on indoor carpet courts at the GWU Charles Smith Center in Washington, D.C. in the United States that was part of the 1985 Virginia Slims World Championship Series. (Note: The 1985 Virginia Slims World Championship Series ran from March 1985 until March 1986.) It was the 15th edition of the tournament and was played from January 6 through January 13, 1986. First-seeded Martina Navratilova won her second consecutive singles title at the event and her seventh in total.

== Finals ==
=== Singles ===
(United States) Martina Navratilova defeated (United States) Pam Shriver 6–1, 6–4

- It was Navratilova's 1st singles title of the year and the 112th of her career.

=== Doubles ===
(United States) Martina Navratilova / (United States) Pam Shriver defeated (West Germany) Claudia Kohde-Kilsch / (Czechoslovakia) Helena Suková 6–3, 6–4
