= 1988 Virginia Slims of Washington =

- Date: February 22–28
- Edition: 17th
- Category: Category 5
- Draw: 32S / 16D
- Prize money: $300,000
- Surface: Carpet / indoor
- Location: Fairfax, Virginia, United States
- Venue: Patriot Center

Champions

Singles
- (United States) Martina Navratilova

Doubles
- (United States) Martina Navratilova / (United States) Pam Shriver
← 1987 ·	Virginia Slims of Washington	· 1989 →

The 1988 Virginia Slims of Washington was a women's tennis tournament played on indoor carpet courts at the Patriot Center in Fairfax, Virginia in the United States and was part of the Category 5 tier of the 1988 WTA Tour. It was the 17th edition of the tournament and was held from February 22 through February 28, 1988. First-seeded Martina Navratilova won the singles title.

== Finals ==
=== Singles ===
(United States) Martina Navratilova defeated (United States) Pam Shriver 6–0, 6–2

- It was Navratilova's 3rd singles title of the year and the 132nd of her career.

=== Doubles ===
(United States) Martina Navratilova / (United States) Pam Shriver defeated (Argentina) Gabriela Sabatini / (Czechoslovakia) Helena Suková 6–4, 6–4

- It was Navratilova's 6th title of the year and the 270th of her career. It was Shriver's 5th title of the year and the 108th of her career.
