= 1977 Volvo Classic =

- Date: March 14–20
- Edition: 6th
- Category: Grand Prix (Three Star)
- Draw: 32S / 16D
- Prize money: $100,000
- Surface: Carpet / indoor
- Location: Washington, D.C., United States
- Venue: Charles E. Smith Center

Champions

Singles
- (United States) Brian Gottfried

Doubles
- (United States) Bob Lutz / (United States) Stan Smith
← 1976 ·	Washington Indoor	· 1978 →

The 1977 Volvo Classic, also known as the Washington Indoor, was a men's tennis tournament played on indoor carpet courts at the Charles E. Smith Center in Washington, D.C. in the United States that was part of the Three Star category of the 1977 Grand Prix circuit. It was the sixth edition of the tournament and was held from March 14 through March 20, 1977. Third-seeded Brian Gottfried won the singles title and earned $20,000 first-prize money after defeating sixth-seeded Bob Lutz in the final.

== Finals ==
=== Singles ===
(United States) Brian Gottfried defeated (United States) Bob Lutz 6–1, 6–2

- It was Gottfried's 3rd singles title of the year and the 10th of his career.

=== Doubles ===
(United States) Bob Lutz / (United States) Stan Smith defeated (United States) Brian Gottfried / (Mexico) Raúl Ramírez 6–3, 7–5

== See also ==
- 1977 Washington Star International
- 1977 Virginia Slims of Washington
