= 1978 Volvo Tennis Classic =

- Date: March 13–19
- Edition: 7th
- Category: Grand Prix
- Draw: 32S / 16D
- Prize money: $125,000
- Surface: Carpet / indoor
- Location: Washington, D.C., United States
- Venue: Charles E. Smith Center

Champions

Singles
- (United States) Brian Gottfried

Doubles
- (United States) Bob Lutz / (United States) Stan Smith
← 1977 ·	Washington Indoor	· 1979 →

The 1978 Volvo Tennis Classic, also known as the Washington Indoor, was a men's tennis tournament played on indoor carpet courts at the Charles E. Smith Center in Washington, D.C. in the United States that was part of the 1978 Grand Prix circuit. It was the seventh edition of the tournament and was held from March 13 through March 19, 1978. First-seeded Brian Gottfried won his second consecutive singles title at the event and earned $21,250 first-prize money after defeating fourth-seeded Raúl Ramírez in the final.

== Finals ==
=== Singles ===
(United States) Brian Gottfried defeated (Mexico) Raúl Ramírez 7–5, 7–6^{(7–4)}

- It was Gottfried's 1st singles title of the year and the 13th of his career.

=== Doubles ===
(United States) Bob Lutz / (United States) Stan Smith defeated (United States) Arthur Ashe / (United States) John McEnroe 6–7, 7–5, 6–1

== See also ==
- 1978 Washington Star International
- 1978 Virginia Slims of Washington
