= 1983 Virginia Slims of Washington =

- Date: January 3 – 10
- Edition: 12th
- Draw: 32S / 16D
- Prize money: $150,000
- Surface: Carpet / indoor
- Location: Washington, D.C., U.S. Landover, Maryland, U.S.
- Venue: GWU Charles Smith Center; Capital Centre

Champions

Singles
- (United States) Martina Navratilova

Doubles
- (United States) Martina Navratilova / (United States) Pam Shriver
← 1982 ·	Virginia Slims of Washington	· 1984 →

The 1983 Virginia Slims of Washington was a women's tennis tournament that was part of the 1983 Virginia Slims World Championship Series. It was the 12th edition of the tournament, played on indoor carpet courts, and was held from January 3 through January 10, 1983. (Note: There was no play scheduled on Sunday, January 9. The final was played on Monday, January 10.) The rounds until the final were played at the GWU Charles Smith Center in Washington, D.C., U.S. while the final was played at the Capital Centre in Landover, Maryland, U.S. First-seeded Martina Navratilova won the singles title and earned $28,000 first-prize money.

== Finals ==
=== Singles ===
(United States) Martina Navratilova defeated (West Germany) Sylvia Hanika 6–1, 6–1

- It was Navratilova's 1st singles title of the year and the 71st of her career.

=== Doubles ===
(United States) Martina Navratilova / (United States) Pam Shriver defeated (United States) Kathy Jordan / (United States) Anne Smith 4–6, 7–5, 6–3

- It was Navratilova's 2nd title of the year and the 149th of her career. It was Shriver's 1st title of the year and the 35th of her career.

== Prize money ==
Event	W	F	SF	QF	Round of 16	Round of 32
Singles	$28,000	$14,000	$7,000	$3,350	$1,675	$825
