= 1991 Virginia Slims of Washington – Singles =

Singles
- 1991 Virginia Slims of Washington

Final
- Champion: (Spain) Arantxa Sánchez Vicario
- Runner-up: (Bulgaria) Katerina Maleeva
- Score: 6–2, 7–5

Details
- Draw: 28
- Seeds: 9

Events
Singles	Doubles
← 1990 ·	Virginia Slims of Washington

Martina Navratilova was the defending champion, but did not compete this year.

Arantxa Sánchez Vicario won the title by defeating Katerina Maleeva 6–2, 7–5 in the final.

== Seeds ==
The first four (and ninth) seeds received a bye to the second round.

1. (Socialist Federal Republic of Yugoslavia) ~~Monica Seles~~ (withdrew)
2. (Spain) Arantxa Sánchez Vicario (champion)
3. (United States) Mary Joe Fernández (semifinals)
4. (Czechoslovakia) Jana Novotná (quarterfinals)
5. (United States) Zina Garrison (quarterfinals)
6. (Bulgaria) Katerina Maleeva (final)
7. (Soviet Union) Leila Meskhi (semifinals)
8. (France) Nathalie Tauziat (first round)
9. (Austria) Judith Wiesner (quarterfinals)

== Draw ==
=== Key ===
- Q = Qualifier
- WC = Wild card
- LL = Lucky loser
- Alt = Alternate
- ITF = ITF entry
- PR = Protected ranking
- SR = Special ranking
- SE = Special exempt
- JE = Junior exempt
- JR = Junior Accelerator Programme entrant
- CO = College Accelerator Programme entrant
- NG = Next Gen Accelerator Program entrant
- w/o = Walkover
- r = Retired
- d = Defaulted

=== Finals ===
Semifinals
6	(Bulgaria) Katerina Maleeva	6	6
3	(United States) Mary Joe Fernández	3	4
7	(Soviet Union) Leila Meskhi	0	1
2	(Spain) Arantxa Sánchez Vicario	6	6

Final
6	(Bulgaria) Katerina Maleeva	2	5
2	(Spain) Arantxa Sánchez Vicario	6	7

=== Top half ===
First round
(Czechoslovakia) R Zrubáková	6	7
(Soviet Union) N Zvereva	4	5
(United States) P Shriver	6	6
(South Africa) E Reinach	2	3
(United States) C Cunningham	4	0
6	(Bulgaria) K Maleeva	6	6
(South Africa) R Fairbank-Nideffer	3	6^{3}
(South Africa) M de Swardt	6	7^{7}
(United States) S Stafford	7^{7}	3	6^{6}
(United States) G Fernández	6^{3}	6	7^{8}
(Czechoslovakia) A Strnadová	6	7
8	(France) N Tauziat	4	5

Second round
9	(Austria) J Wiesner	1	6	6
(Czechoslovakia) R Zrubáková	6	2	3
(United States) P Shriver	6^{2}	6	1
6	(Bulgaria) K Maleeva	7^{7}	3	6
3	(United States) MJ Fernández	6	6
(South Africa) M de Swardt	4	1
(United States) G Fernández	6	7
(Czechoslovakia) A Strnadová	0	5

Quarterfinals
9	(Austria) J Wiesner	4	2
6	(Bulgaria) K Maleeva	6	6
3	(United States) MJ Fernández	6	3	6
(United States) G Fernández	4	6	3

Semifinals
6	(Bulgaria) K Maleeva	6	6
3	(United States) MJ Fernández	3	4

=== Bottom half ===
First round
7	(Soviet Union) L Meskhi	6	4
(Italy) L Ferrando	3	4^{r}
(Australia) A Minter	6	6
(United States) R White	4	1
(Peru) L Gildemeister	3	6	6
(United States) G Magers	6	2	2
5	(United States) Z Garrison	6	6
(Argentina) C Tessi	2	2
(Sweden) C Lindqvist	4	3
(Bulgaria) M Maleeva	6	6
(Canada) H Kelesi	5	4
(Czechoslovakia) R Rajchrtová	7	6

Second round
7	(Soviet Union) L Meskhi	4	6	6
(Australia) A Minter	6	1	4
(Peru) L Gildemeister	1	1
4	(Czechoslovakia) J Novotná	6	6
5	(United States) Z Garrison	6	2	6
(Bulgaria) M Maleeva	3	6	1
(Czechoslovakia) R Rajchrtová	4	4
2	(Spain) A Sánchez Vicario	6	6

Quarterfinals
7	(Soviet Union) L Meskhi	6	2	6
4	(Czechoslovakia) J Novotná	2	6	4
5	(United States) Z Garrison	3	2
2	(Spain) A Sánchez Vicario	6	6

Semifinals
7	(Soviet Union) L Meskhi	0	1
2	(Spain) A Sánchez Vicario	6	6
