= 1983 Virginia Slims of Washington – Doubles =

Doubles
- 1983 Virginia Slims of Washington
- 1982 Champions: (United States) Kathy Jordan (United States) Anne Smith

Final
- Champions: (United States) Martina Navratilova (United States) Pam Shriver
- Runners-up: (United States) Kathy Jordan (United States) Anne Smith
- Score: 4–6, 7–5, 6–3

Events
| Singles | Doubles |
| ← 1982 · | Virginia Slims of Washington | · 1984 → |

Kathy Jordan and Anne Smith were the defending champions but lost in the final 4–6, 7–5, 6–3 against Martina Navratilova and Pam Shriver.

== Seeds ==
Champion seeds are indicated in bold text while text in italics indicates the round in which those seeds were eliminated.

1. (United States) **Martina Navratilova** / (United States) **Pam Shriver (champions)**
2. (United States) Kathy Jordan / (United States) Anne Smith (final)
3. n/a
4. (United Kingdom) Jo Durie / (United States) Barbara Potter (quarterfinals)

== Draw ==
=== Key ===
- Q = Qualifier
- WC = Wild card
- LL = Lucky loser
- Alt = Alternate
- SE = Special exempt
- PR = Protected ranking
- ITF = ITF entry
- JE = Junior exempt
- w/o = Walkover
- r = Retired
- d = Defaulted
- SR = Special ranking

First round
1 | (United States) **M Navratilova** (United States) **P Shriver** | **6** | **6**
(United States) Z Garrison (United States) A Moulton | 3 | 2
(Australia) **D Fromholtz** (United States) **K Jones-Shaefer** | **7** | **6**
(United States) J Davis (United States) H Ludloff | 6 | 3
4 | (United Kingdom) **J Durie** (United States) **B Potter** | 2 | **6** | **6**
(United States) A Jaeger (United States) M L Piatek | **6** | 3 | 0
(United States) **A Kiyomura** (United States) **P Smith** | **6** | **6**
(United States) C Reynolds (United States) J Russell | 3 | 4
(United States) **S Collins** (Czechoslovakia) **H Suková** | **w/o**
(United States) A Leand (United States) P Teeguarden
(United States) L DuPont (Netherlands) B Stöve | 1 | 1
LL | (Australia) **S Leo** (Italy) **S Simmonds** | **6** | **6**
(United States) K Horvath (South Africa) Y Vermaak | 4 | 3
(United States) **A-M Fernandez** (United States) **B Herr** | **6** | **6**
(West Germany) B Bunge (West Germany) S Hanika | 4 | 1
2 | (United States) **K Jordan** (United States) **A Smith** | **6** | **6**

Quarterfinals
1 | (United States) **M Navratilova** (United States) **P Shriver** | **6** | **6**
(Australia) D Fromholtz (United States) K Jones-Shaefer | 1 | 1
4 | (United Kingdom) J Durie (United States) B Potter | 6 | 4
(United States) **A Kiyomura** (United States) **P Smith** | **7** | **6**
(United States) **S Collins** (Czechoslovakia) **H Suková** | **6** | **6**
LL | (Australia) S Leo (Italy) S Simmonds | 3 | 4
(United States) A-M Fernandez (United States) B Herr | **6** | 2 | 2
2 | (United States) **K Jordan** (United States) **A Smith** | 1 | **6** | **6**

Semifinals
1 | (United States) **M Navratilova** (United States) **P Shriver** | **6** | **6**
(United States) A Kiyomura (United States) P Smith | 2 | 1
(United States) S Collins (Czechoslovakia) H Suková | **6** | 0 | 3
2 | (United States) **K Jordan** (United States) **A Smith** | 3 | **6** | **6**

Final
1 | (United States) **Martina Navratilova** (United States) **Pam Shriver** | 4 | **7** | **6**
2 | (United States) Kathy Jordan (United States) Anne Smith | **6** | 5 | 3
