= 1976 Volvo Classic =

- Date: March 16–21
- Edition: 5th
- Category: WCT
- Draw: 16S / 8D
- Prize money: $60,000
- Surface: Carpet / indoor
- Location: Washington, D.C., United States
- Venue: Charles E. Smith Center

Champions

Singles
- (United States) Harold Solomon

Doubles
- (United States) Eddie Dibbs / (United States) Harold Solomon
← 1975 ·	Washington Indoor	· 1977 →

The 1976 Volvo Classic, also known as the Washington Indoor, was a men's tennis tournament played on indoor carpet courts at the Charles E. Smith Center in Washington, D.C. in the United States that was part of the 1976 World Championship Tennis circuit. It was the fifth edition of the tournament and was held from March 16 through March 21, 1976. Fourth-seeded Harold Solomon won the singles title and earned $17,000 first-prize money after defeating unseeded Onny Parun in the final.

== Finals ==
=== Singles ===
(United States) Harold Solomon defeated (Australia) Onny Parun 6–3, 6–1

- It was Solomon's 1st singles title of the year and the 6th of his career.

=== Doubles ===
(United States) Eddie Dibbs / (United States) Harold Solomon defeated (United Kingdom) Mark Cox / (South Africa) Cliff Drysdale 6–4, 7–5

== See also ==
- 1976 Washington Star International
- 1976 Virginia Slims of Washington
