= 1983 Virginia Slims of Washington – Singles =

Singles
- 1983 Virginia Slims of Washington
- Final date: January 10, 1983

Final
- Champion: (United States) Martina Navratilova
- Runner-up: (West Germany) Sylvia Hanika
- Score: 6–1, 6–1

Details
- Draw: 32 (5 Q )
- Seeds: 8

Events
Singles	Doubles
← 1982 ·	Virginia Slims of Washington	· 1984 →

Martina Navratilova was the defending singles champion of the Virginia Slims of Washington tennis tournament and won in the final 6–1, 6–1 against Sylvia Hanika.

The draw consisted of 32 players of which eight were seeded. The main draw was preceded by a 32-player qualifying competition.

== Seeds ==
A champion seed is indicated in bold text while text in italics indicates the round in which that seed was eliminated.

1. (United States) **Martina Navratilova (champion)**
2. (United States) Andrea Jaeger (semifinals)
3. (Czechoslovakia) Hana Mandlíková (quarterfinals)
4. (United States) Barbara Potter (quarterfinals)
5. (West Germany) Bettina Bunge (first round)
6. (West Germany) Sylvia Hanika (final)
7. (United States) Anne Smith (second round)
8. (United States) Zina Garrison (second round)

== Draw ==
=== Key ===
- Q = Qualifier
- WC = Wild card
- LL = Lucky loser
- Alt = Alternate
- SE = Special exempt
- PR = Protected ranking
- ITF = ITF entry
- JE = Junior exempt
- w/o = Walkover
- r = Retired
- d = Defaulted
- SR = Special ranking

First round
1	(United States) **M Navratilova**	**6**	**6**
Q	(United States) L-A Thompson	2	1
(Australia) D Fromholtz	**6**	4	1
Q	(United States) **V Nelson**	3	**6**	**6**
(United States) S Mascarin	1	6
(Czechoslovakia) **H Suková**	**6**	**7**
(West Germany) E Pfaff	3	**6**	4
7	(United States) **A Smith**	**6**	0	**6**
4	(United States) **B Potter**	**6**	**7**
(United States) K Jordan	2	6
(United States) **A Kiyomura**	**6**	**6**
(Romania) L Romanov	3	3
(Italy) S Simmonds	2	3
(United States) **M L Piatek**	**6**	**6**
(United States) **A Leand**	**6**	**6**
5	(West Germany) B Bunge	4	4
6	(West Germany) **S Hanika**	**7**	4	**7**
(Hungary) A Temesvári	6	**6**	5
Q	(Canada) **C Bassett**	**7**	**6**
(United States) A Moulton	6	1
(United Kingdom) **J Durie**	**6**	**6**
(South Africa) Y Vermaak	3	2
Q	(United States) A-M Fernandez	3	0
3	(Czechoslovakia) **H Mandlíková**	**6**	**6**
8	(United States) **Z Garrison**	**6**	**1**
(West Germany) C Kohde-Kilsch	3	0	r
(United States) **J Russell**	**7**	**6**
(United States) B Herr	6	4
Q	(United States) **M Louie**	**6**	**6**
LL	(Czechoslovakia) K Skronská	2	1
(United States) C Reynolds	**7**	1	3
2	(United States) **A Jaeger**	5	**6**	**6**

Second round
1	(United States) **M Navratilova**	**6**	**6**
Q	(United States) V Nelson	0	0
(Czechoslovakia) **H Suková**	**6**	**6**
7	(United States) A Smith	1	3
4	(United States) **B Potter**	**6**	**6**
(United States) A Kiyomura	1	3
(United States) **M L Piatek**	4	**6**	**6**
(United States) A Leand	**6**	1	3
6	(West Germany) **S Hanika**	**6**	**7**
Q	(Canada) C Bassett	3	5
(United Kingdom) J Durie	1	3
3	(Czechoslovakia) **H Mandlíková**	**6**	**6**
8	(United States) Z Garrison	4	5
(United States) **J Russell**	**6**	**7**
Q	(United States) M Louie	4	4
2	(United States) **A Jaeger**	**6**	**6**

Quarterfinals
1	(United States) **M Navratilova**	**6**	**6**
(Czechoslovakia) H Suková	2	1
4	(United States) B Potter	3	4
(United States) **M L Piatek**	**6**	**6**
6	(West Germany) **S Hanika**	6	**7**	**6**
3	(Czechoslovakia) H Mandlíková	**7**	5	2
(United States) J Russell	**7**	5	2
2	(United States) **A Jaeger**	6	**7**	**6**

Semifinals
1	(United States) **M Navratilova**	**6**	**6**
(United States) M L Piatek	1	3
6	(West Germany) **S Hanika**	6	**6**	**7**
2	(United States) A Jaeger	**7**	3	5

Final
1	(United States) **Martina Navratilova**	**6**	**6**
6	(West Germany) Sylvia Hanika	1	1
