= 1971 Washington Star International – Singles =

Singles
- 1971 Washington Star International

Final
- Champion: (Australia) Ken Rosewall
- Runner-up: (United States) Marty Riessen
- Score: 6–2, 7–5, 6–1

Details
- Draw: 64

Events
Singles	Doubles
← 1970 ·	Washington Open	· 1972 →

The 1971 Washington Star International – Singles was an event of the 1971 Washington Star International tennis tournament and was played in Washington, D.C., United States from July 12 through July 18, 1971. Cliff Richey was the defending champion but lost in the second round. Ken Rosewall won the singles title, defeating Marty Riessen in the final, 6–2, 7–5, 6–1.

== Draw ==
=== Key ===
- Q = Qualifier
- WC = Wild card
- LL = Lucky loser
- Alt = Alternate
- SE = Special exempt
- PR = Protected ranking
- ITF = ITF entry
- JE = Junior exempt
- w/o = Walkover
- r = Retired
- d = Defaulted
- SR = Special ranking

=== Finals ===
Quarterfinals
(Australia) John Newcombe	6	4	6
(Spain) Andrés Gimeno	1	6	4
(Egypt) Ismail El Shafei	1	7	2
(United States) Marty Riessen	6	6	6
(South Africa) Cliff Drysdale	6	6	1
(United States) Stan Smith	0	7	6
(United States) Dennis Ralston	1	4
(Australia) Ken Rosewall	6	6

Semifinals
(Australia) John Newcombe	6	3	6
(United States) Marty Riessen	4	6	7
(United States) Stan Smith	3	2
(Australia) Ken Rosewall	6	6

Final
(United States) Marty Riessen	2	5	1
(Australia) Ken Rosewall	6	7	6

=== Top half ===
==== Section 1 ====
First Round
(Australia) John Newcombe	6	6
(Denmark) Torben Ulrich	0	0
(South Africa) Raymond Moore	6	6
(Czechoslovakia) Milan Holeček	2	2
(United Kingdom) Roger Taylor	6	6
(United States) Erik van Dillen	4	4
(United States) Clark Graebner	6	7
(Pakistan) Haroon Rahim	4	5
(Chile) Patricio Cornejo	6	0
(Australia) Roy Emerson	4	0^{r}
(Canada) Mike Belkin	6	6
(United States) Roscoe Tanner	1	2
(Spain) Andrés Gimeno	6	6
(United States) Alex Olmedo	2	1
(United States) Cliff Richey	6	6
(United States) Jeff Austin	3	2

Second Round
(Australia) John Newcombe	7	5	6
(South Africa) Raymond Moore	5	7	3
(United Kingdom) Roger Taylor	6	3	7
(United States) Clark Graebner	2	6	5
(Chile) Patricio Cornejo	1	1
(Canada) Mike Belkin	6	6
(Spain) Andrés Gimeno	6	7
(United States) Cliff Richey	1	6

Third Round
(Australia) John Newcombe	6	6
(United Kingdom) Roger Taylor	2	2
(Canada) Mike Belkin	6	2	3
(Spain) Andrés Gimeno	4	6	6

Quarterfinals
(Australia) John Newcombe	6	4	6
(Spain) Andrés Gimeno	1	6	4

==== Section 2 ====
First Round
(United States) Arthur Ashe	6	6
(Argentina) Lito Álvarez	1	2
(France) Pierre Barthès	6	6	6
(United States) Fred McNair	7	1	4
(Egypt) Ismail El Shafei	7	2	6
(South Africa) Frew McMillan	6	6	2
(France) Georges Goven	6	1	6
(Australia) Allan Stone	4	6	1
(United States) Marty Riessen	6	0	6
(Australia) Terry Addison	0	6	2
(Australia) Ray Ruffels	7	6
(New Zealand) Brian Fairlie	5	2
(United States) Frank Froehling	7	3	7
(Australia) Bob Carmichael	5	6	5
(Australia) Owen Davidson	3	6	7
(United States) Brian Gottfried	6	3	5

Second Round
(United States) Arthur Ashe	6	6	1
(France) Pierre Barthès	7	1	6
(Egypt) Ismail El Shafei	7	6
(France) Georges Goven	5	2
(United States) Marty Riessen	4	6	6
(Australia) Ray Ruffels	6	1	3
(United States) Frank Froehling	6	6
(Australia) Owen Davidson	1	0

Third Round
(France) Pierre Barthès	4	1
(Egypt) Ismail El Shafei	6	6
(United States) Marty Riessen	7	6
(United States) Frank Froehling	5	1

Quarterfinals
(Egypt) Ismail El Shafei	1	7	2
(United States) Marty Riessen	6	6	6

=== Bottom half ===
==== Section 3 ====
First Round
(United States) Charlie Pasarell	7	6
(United States) Paul Gerken	5	4
(Socialist Federal Republic of Yugoslavia) Boro Jovanović	7	6
(United States) Bob Lutz	6	2
(South Africa) Bob Maud	6	6
(United Kingdom) Peter Curtis	2	1
(South Africa) Cliff Drysdale	6	3	6
(United States) Barry MacKay (tennis)	3	6	1
(Socialist Federal Republic of Yugoslavia) Željko Franulović	7	6
(Australia) Phil Dent	6	4
(United States) Jeff Borowiak	6	6
(United States) Jimmy Connors	3	2
(United States) Tom Edlefsen	7	0	6
(Socialist Federal Republic of Yugoslavia) Nikola Pilić	5	6	3
(United States) Stan Smith	6	6
(United States) Harold Solomon	4	2

Second Round
(United States) Charlie Pasarell	6	2	6
(Socialist Federal Republic of Yugoslavia) Boro Jovanović	4	6	2
(South Africa) Bob Maud	4	4
(South Africa) Cliff Drysdale	6	6
(Socialist Federal Republic of Yugoslavia) Željko Franulović	6	6
(United States) Jeff Borowiak	4	4
(United States) Tom Edlefsen	1	6
(United States) Stan Smith	6	7

Third Round
(United States) Charlie Pasarell	2	2
(South Africa) Cliff Drysdale	6	6
(Socialist Federal Republic of Yugoslavia) Željko Franulović	6	6
(United States) Stan Smith	7	7

Quarterfinals
(South Africa) Cliff Drysdale	6	6	1
(United States) Stan Smith	0	7	6

==== Section 4 ====
First Round
(New Zealand) Onny Parun	6	6
(Jamaica) Richard Russell	4	3
(United States) Dennis Ralston	6	7
(United Kingdom) Graham Stilwell	3	6
(Australia) Bill Bowrey	6	6
(Chile) Jaime Fillol	4	3
(Netherlands) Tom Okker	7	6
(South Africa) Terry Ryan	5	3
(Australia) Fred Stolle	6	6
(United States) Dick Dell	2	2
(Australia) Rod Laver	6	6
(United States) Roy Barth	3	1
(Australia) John Alexander	6	6
(United States) Jim McManus	3	3
(Australia) Ken Rosewall	3	7	6
(United States) Jim Osborne	6	6	1

Second Round
(New Zealand) Onny Parun	6	2
(United States) Dennis Ralston	7	6
(Australia) Bill Bowrey	3	5
(Netherlands) Tom Okker	6	7
(Australia) Fred Stolle	2	3
(Australia) Rod Laver	6	6
(Australia) John Alexander	6	1	1
(Australia) Ken Rosewall	4	6	6

Third Round
(United States) Dennis Ralston	7	7
(Netherlands) Tom Okker	6	6
(Australia) Rod Laver	7	3	1
(Australia) Ken Rosewall	5	6	6

Quarterfinals
(United States) Dennis Ralston	1	4
(Australia) Ken Rosewall	6	6
