= 1989 Virginia Slims of Washington – Singles =

Singles
- 1989 Virginia Slims of Washington
- 1988 Champion: (United States) Martina Navratilova

Final
- Champion: (West Germany) Steffi Graf
- Runner-up: (United States) Zina Garrison
- Score: 6–1, 7–5

Details
- Draw: 32
- Seeds: 8

Events
Singles	Doubles
← 1988 ·	Virginia Slims of Washington	· 1990 →

Martina Navratilova was the defending champion of the singles title at the Virginia Slims of Washington tennis tournament but did not compete that year.

Graf won in the final 6–1, 7–5 against Zina Garrison.

== Seeds ==
A champion seed is indicated in bold text while text in italics indicates the round in which that seed was eliminated.

1. (West Germany) **Steffi Graf (champion)**
2. n/a
3. (Bulgaria) Manuela Maleeva (quarterfinals)
4. (Soviet Union) Natasha Zvereva (semifinals)
5. (United States) Zina Garrison (final)
6. (United States) Barbara Potter (first round)
7. (Soviet Union) Larisa Savchenko (first round)
8. (Canada) Helen Kelesi (quarterfinals)

== Draw ==
=== Key ===
- Q = Qualifier
- WC = Wild card
- LL = Lucky loser
- Alt = Alternate
- SE = Special exempt
- PR = Protected ranking
- ITF = ITF entry
- JE = Junior exempt
- w/o = Walkover
- r = Retired
- d = Defaulted
- SR = Special ranking

First round
1	(West Germany) **S Graf**	**6**	**6**
(United States) S Martin	1	1
Q	(Poland) R Baranski	3	1
(Canada) **C Bassett-Seguso**	**6**	**6**
(France) **I Demongeot**	**6**	**6**
Q	(United States) K Adams	3	3
(United States) P Louie-Harper	**7**	3	1
8	(Canada) **H Kelesi**	6	**6**	**6**
4	(Soviet Union) **N Zvereva**	**7**	**6**
(United States) C Benjamin	5	1
(United States) W White	**6**	6	4
(United States) **J Ingram**	4	**7**	**6**
(United States) T Phelps	**6**	1	2
(Soviet Union) **L Meskhi**	2	**6**	**6**
(West Germany) **E Pfaff**	**6**	3	**6**
6	(United States) B Potter	3	**6**	2
7	(Soviet Union) L Savchenko	0	2
(Socialist Federal Republic of Yugoslavia) **M Seles**	**6**	**6**
(South Africa) E Reinach	5	3
(United States) **R White**	**7**	**6**
(United States) **A Henricksson**	**6**	**6**
(United Kingdom) M Javer	0	3
LL	(Czechoslovakia) A Holíková	2	4
3	(Bulgaria) **M Maleeva**	**6**	**6**
5	(United States) **Z Garrison**	**6**	**6**
(United States) S Sloane	0	3
(United States) **M L Daniels**	**6**	4	**6**
Q	(United States) A Leand	4	**6**	3
(South Africa) **D van Rensburg**	**6**	**6**
Q	(United States) S Collins	4	4
(France) N Tauziat	**7**	6	6
LL	(United States) **G Fernández**	5	**7**	**7**

Second round
1	(West Germany) **S Graf**	**6**	**6**
(Canada) C Bassett-Seguso	0	0
(France) I Demongeot	3	4
8	(Canada) **H Kelesi**	**6**	**6**
4	(Soviet Union) **N Zvereva**	**6**	**6**
(United States) J Ingram	2	4
(Soviet Union) **L Meskhi**	**6**	**6**
(West Germany) E Pfaff	0	2
(Socialist Federal Republic of Yugoslavia) **M Seles**	**6**	**6**
(United States) R White	3	0
(United States) A Henricksson	4	**6**	3
3	(Bulgaria) **M Maleeva**	**6**	4	**6**
5	(United States) **Z Garrison**	**6**	**6**
(United States) M L Daniels	2	0
(South Africa) D van Rensburg	2	0
LL	(United States) **G Fernández**	**6**	**6**

Quarterfinals
1	(West Germany) **S Graf**	**6**	**6**
8	(Canada) H Kelesi	0	1
4	(Soviet Union) **N Zvereva**	**6**	**6**
(Soviet Union) L Meskhi	2	0
(Socialist Federal Republic of Yugoslavia) **M Seles**	**6**	**6**
3	(Bulgaria) M Maleeva	2	4
5	(United States) **Z Garrison**	**6**	**6**
LL	(United States) G Fernández	4	0

Semifinals
1	(West Germany) **S Graf**	**6**	**6**
4	(Soviet Union) N Zvereva	3	4
(Socialist Federal Republic of Yugoslavia) M Seles
5	(United States) **Z Garrison**	**w/o**

Final
1	(West Germany) **Steffi Graf**	**6**	**7**
5	(United States) Zina Garrison	1	5
