= 1974 Xerox WCT Tennis Classic =

- Date: March 11–17
- Edition: 3rd
- Category: WCT (Red Group)
- Draw: 32S / 16D
- Prize money: $50,000
- Surface: Carpet / indoor
- Location: Landover, Maryland, United States
- Venue: Capital Centre

Champions

Singles
- (Romania) Ilie Năstase

Doubles
- (South Africa) Bob Hewitt / (South Africa) Frew McMillan
← 1973 ·	Washington Indoor	· 1975 →

The 1974 Xerox WCT Tennis Classic , also known as the Washington Indoor, was a men's tennis tournament played on indoor carpet courts at the Capital Centre in Landover, Maryland in the United States that was part of the Red Group of the 1974 World Championship Tennis circuit. It was the third edition of the tournament and was held from March 11 through March 17, 1974. First-seeded Ilie Năstase won the singles title and earned $10,000 first-prize money after defeating defending champion Tom Okker in the final.

== Finals ==
=== Singles ===
(Romania) Ilie Năstase defeated (Netherlands) Tom Okker 6–3, 6–3

- It was Năstase's 2nd singles title of the year and the 42nd of his career.

=== Doubles ===
(South Africa) Bob Hewitt / (South Africa) Frew McMillan defeated (Netherlands) Tom Okker / (United States) Marty Riessen 7–6, 6–3

== See also ==
- 1974 Washington Star International
