= 1982 Avon Championships of Washington =

- Date: January 4–11
- Edition: 9th
- Category: Virginia Slims circuit
- Draw: 32S / 16D
- Prize money: $200,000
- Surface: Carpet / indoor
- Location: Washington D.C., U.S. Landover, Maryland, U.S.
- Venue: GWU Charles Smith Center; Capital Centre

Champions

Singles
- (United States) Martina Navratilova

Doubles
- (United States) Kathy Jordan / (United States) Anne Smith
← 1979 ·	Virginia Slims of Washington	· 1983 →

The 1982 Avon Championships of Washington was a women's tennis tournament played on indoor carpet courts (Sporteze) at the GWU Charles Smith Center and the Capital Centre in Washington D.C., District of Columbia in the United States that was part of the 1982 Avon Championships Circuit. It was the ninth edition of the tournament and was held from January 4 through January 11, 1982. Second-seeded Martina Navratilova won the singles title and earned $40,000 first-prize money.

== Finals ==
=== Singles ===
(United States) Martina Navratilova defeated (United States) Anne Smith 6–2, 6–3

- It was Navratilova's first singles title of the year and the 56th of her career.

=== Doubles ===
(United States) Kathy Jordan / (United States) Anne Smith defeated (United States) Martina Navratilova / (United States) Pam Shriver 6–2, 3–6, 6–1

== Prize money ==
Event	W	F	SF	QF	Round of 16	Round of 32
Singles	$40,000	$20,000	$9,900	$4,800	$2,500	$1,350
