= 1975 Xerox Tennis Classic =

- Date: March 10–16
- Edition: 4th
- Category: WCT (Red Group)
- Draw: 32S / 16D
- Prize money: $60,000
- Surface: Carpet / indoor
- Location: Landover, Maryland, United States
- Venue: Capital Centre

Champions

Singles
- (United Kingdom) Mark Cox

Doubles
- (United States) Mike Estep / (New Zealand) Jeff Simpson
← 1974 ·	Washington Indoor	· 1976 →

The 1975 Xerox Tennis Classic, also known as the Washington Indoor, was a men's tennis tournament played on indoor carpet courts at the Capital Centre in Landover, Maryland in the United States that was part of the Red Group of the 1975 World Championship Tennis circuit. It was the fourth edition of the tournament and was held from March 10 through March 16, 1975. Unseeded Mark Cox won the singles title and earned $12,000 first-prize money after defeating Dick Stockton in the final.

== Finals ==
=== Singles ===
(United Kingdom) Mark Cox defeated (United States) Dick Stockton 6–2, 7–6

- It was Cox's 1st singles title of the year and the 16th of his career in the Open Era.

=== Doubles ===
(United States) Mike Estep / (New Zealand) Jeff Simpson defeated (India) Anand Amritraj / (India) Vijay Amritraj 7–6, 6–3

== See also ==
- 1975 Washington Star International
- 1975 Virginia Slims of Washington
