= 1974 Washington Star International =

- Date: July 23–29
- Edition: 6th
- Category: Grand Prix (Grade AA)
- Draw: 64S / 32D
- Prize money: $100,000
- Surface: Clay / outdoor
- Location: Washington, D.C., United States
- Venue: Washington Tennis Stadium

Champions

Singles
- (United States) Harold Solomon

Doubles
- (United States) Tom Gorman / (United States) Marty Riessen
← 1973 ·	Washington Open	· 1975 →

The 1974 Washington Star International was a men's tennis tournament and was played on outdoor clay courts. It was categorized as an AA tournament and was part of the 1974 Grand Prix circuit. It was the sixth edition of the tournament and was held at the Washington Tennis Stadium in Washington, D.C. from July 23 through July 29, 1974. Eleventh-seeded Harold Solomon won the singles title and earned $16,000 prize money in a final that was played over two days due to rain.

== Finals ==
=== Singles ===
(United States) Harold Solomon defeated (Argentina) Guillermo Vilas 1–6, 6–3, 6–4

- It was Solomon's first singles title of his career.

=== Doubles ===
(United States) Tom Gorman / (United States) Marty Riessen defeated (Chile) Patricio Cornejo / (Chile) Jaime Fillol 7–5, 6–1

== See also ==
- 1974 Xerox WCT Tennis Classic
