= 1972 Washington Star International – Doubles =

Doubles
- 1972 Washington Star International

Final
- Champion: (Netherlands) Tom Okker (United States) Marty Riessen
- Runner-up: (Australia) John Newcombe (Australia) Tony Roche
- Score: 3–6, 6–3, 6–2

Details
- Draw: 16

Events
Singles	Doubles
← 1971 ·	Washington Open	· 1973 →

The 1972 Washington Star International – Doubles was an event of the 1972 Washington Star International tennis tournament and was played in Washington, D.C., United States from July 17 through July 23, 1972. The draw consisted of 16 teams. Tom Okker and Marty Riessen were the defending doubles champions and retained their title, defeating John Newcombe and Tony Roche in the final, 3–6, 6–3, 6–2.

== Draw ==
=== Key ===
- Q = Qualifier
- WC = Wild card
- LL = Lucky loser
- Alt = Alternate
- SE = Special exempt
- PR = Protected ranking
- ITF = ITF entry
- JE = Junior exempt
- w/o = Walkover
- r = Retired
- d = Defaulted
- SR = Special ranking

First Round
(Australia) John Alexander (Australia) Phil Dent	6	7
(United Kingdom) Mark Cox (United Kingdom) Graham Stilwell	3	6
(South Africa) Cliff Drysdale (United Kingdom) Roger Taylor	6	6
(Egypt) Ismail El Shafei (New Zealand) Brian Fairlie	0	4
(Netherlands) Tom Okker (United States) Marty Riessen	4	6	7
(United States) Jeff Borowiak (Pakistan) Haroon Rahim	6	3	6
(Australia) Rod Laver (Australia) Fred Stolle	7	6
(United States) Roy Barth (United States) Tom Leonard	6	1
(Australia) Bob Carmichael (Australia) Ray Ruffels	6	6
(United States) Bob Goeltz (United States) Ron Goldman	2	4
(Australia) Terry Addison (South Africa) Bob Maud	6	6	6
(United States) Frank Froehling (United States) Charlie Pasarell	4	7	4
(Socialist Federal Republic of Yugoslavia) Nikola Pilić (United States) Doug Stone	6	6
(United States) Arthur Ashe (United States) Bob Lutz	4	1
(Australia) John Newcombe (Australia) Tony Roche	6	7
(United Kingdom) Gerald Battrick (United States) Cliff Richey	1	5

Quarterfinals
(Australia) John Alexander (Australia) Phil Dent	3	3
(South Africa) Cliff Drysdale (United Kingdom) Roger Taylor	6	6
(Netherlands) Tom Okker (United States) Marty Riessen	6	7
(Australia) Rod Laver (Australia) Fred Stolle	3	6
(Australia) Bob Carmichael (Australia) Ray Ruffels	1	7	7
(Australia) Terry Addison (South Africa) Bob Maud	6	5	6
(Socialist Federal Republic of Yugoslavia) Nikola Pilić (United States) Doug Stone	5	6	6
(Australia) John Newcombe (Australia) Tony Roche	7	3	7

Semifinals
(South Africa) Cliff Drysdale (United Kingdom) Roger Taylor	6	7	0
(Netherlands) Tom Okker (United States) Marty Riessen	7	5	6
(Australia) Bob Carmichael (Australia) Ray Ruffels	3	6	5
(Australia) John Newcombe (Australia) Tony Roche	6	2	7

Final
(Netherlands) Tom Okker (United States) Marty Riessen	3	6	6
(Australia) John Newcombe (Australia) Tony Roche	6	3	2
