= 1985 Virginia Slims of Washington =

- Date: January 7–13
- Edition: 14th
- Draw: 32S / 16D
- Prize money: $150,000
- Surface: Carpet / indoor
- Location: Washington, D.C., United States

Champions

Singles
- (United States) Martina Navratilova

Doubles
- (United States) Gigi Fernández (United States) Martina Navratilova
← 1984 ·	Virginia Slims of Washington	· 1986 →

The 1985 Virginia Slims of Washington, also known as the VS of Washington, was a women's tennis tournament played on indoor carpet courts in Washington, D.C. in the United States that was part of the 1984 Virginia Slims World Championship Series. (Note: The 1984 Virginia Slims World Championship Series ran from March 1984 through March 1985.) It was the 14th edition of the event and was played from January 7 through January 13, 1985. First-seeded Martina Navratilova won the singles title and $28,000 first-prize money.

== Finals ==
=== Singles ===
(United States) Martina Navratilova defeated (Bulgaria) Manuela Maleeva 6–3, 6–2

- It was Navratilova's 1st singles title of the year and the 100th of her career.

=== Doubles ===
(United States) Gigi Fernández / (United States) Martina Navratilova defeated (West Germany) Claudia Kohde-Kilsch / (Czechoslovakia) Helena Suková 6–3, 3–6 6–3
