= 1984 Virginia Slims of Washington – Doubles =

Doubles
- 1984 Virginia Slims of Washington

Final
- Champions: (United States) Barbara Potter (United States) Sharon Walsh
- Runners-up: (United States) Leslie Allen (United States) Anne White
- Score: 6–1, 6–7^{(7–9)}, 6–2

Details
- Draw: 16
- Seeds: 4

Events
Singles	Doubles
- Virginia Slims of Washington

Martina Navratilova and Pam Shriver were the defending champions, but Navratilova did not compete this year. Shriver teamed up with JoAnne Russell and lost in the first round to Hana Mandlíková and Helena Suková.

Barbara Potter and Sharon Walsh won the title by defeating Leslie Allen and Anne White 6–1, 6–7^{(7–9)}, 6–2 in the final.

== Seeds ==
1. (United States) JoAnne Russell / (United States) Pam Shriver (first round)
2. (United Kingdom) Anne Hobbs / (Australia) Wendy Turnbull (first round)
3. (United States) Barbara Potter / (United States) Sharon Walsh (champions)
4. (United States) Lea Antonoplis / (United States) Barbara Jordan (quarterfinals)

== Draw ==
Key

- Q = Qualifier
- WC = Wild card
- LL = Lucky loser
- Alt = Alternate
- ITF = ITF entry
- PR = Protected ranking
- SR = Special ranking
- SE = Special exempt
- JE = Junior exempt
- JR = Junior Accelerator Programme entrant
- CO = College Accelerator Programme entrant
- NG = Next Gen Accelerator Program entrant
- w/o = Walkover
- r = Retired
- d = Defaulted

=== Draw ===
First round
1	(United States) J Russell (United States) P Shriver	6	4
(Czechoslovakia) H Mandlíková (Czechoslovakia) H Suková	7	6
(South Africa) I Kloss (South Africa) Y Vermaak	6	7	4
(United States) B Gadusek (Switzerland) C Jolissaint	7	6	6
(United States) C Benjamin (United States) S Collins	6	3	6
(United States) L Bonder (United States) A Jaeger	0	6	1
(United States) T Holladay (United States) K Shaefer	6	1	2
3	(United States) B Potter (United States) S Walsh	4	6	6
4	(United States) L Antonoplis (United States) B Jordan	6	2	6
(Canada) C Bassett (United States) K Horvath	4	6	2
(West Germany) B Bunge (West Germany) E Pfaff	6	7
(United States) Z Garrison (United States) L McNeil	4	6
(United States) P Louie (United States) K Sands	7	6
(West Germany) C Kohde-Kilsch (France) P Paradis	6	4
(United States) Le Allen (United States) A White	6	7
2	(United Kingdom) A Hobbs (Australia) W Turnbull	4	5

Quarterfinals
(Czechoslovakia) H Mandlíková (Czechoslovakia) H Suková	6	6
(United States) B Gadusek (Switzerland) C Jolissaint	3	3
(United States) C Benjamin (United States) S Collins	3	3
3	(United States) B Potter (United States) S Walsh	6	6
4	(United States) L Antonoplis (United States) B Jordan	6	0	1
(West Germany) B Bunge (West Germany) E Pfaff	4	6	6
(United States) P Louie (United States) K Sands	2	3
(United States) Le Allen (United States) A White	6	6

Semifinals
(Czechoslovakia) H Mandlíková (Czechoslovakia) H Suková	3	7	1
3	(United States) B Potter (United States) S Walsh	6	5	6
(West Germany) B Bunge (West Germany) E Pfaff	4	4
(United States) Le Allen (United States) A White	6	6

Final
3	(United States) B Potter (United States) S Walsh	6	6^{7}	6
(United States) Le Allen (United States) A White	1	7^{9}	2
