= 1971 Washington Star International – Doubles =

Doubles
- 1971 Washington Star International

Final
- Champion: (Netherlands) Tom Okker (United States) Marty Riessen
- Runner-up: (Australia) Bob Carmichael (Australia) Ray Ruffels
- Score: 7–6, 6–2

Details
- Draw: 32

Events
| Singles | Doubles |
| ← 1970 · | Washington Open | · 1972 → |

The 1971 Washington Star International – Doubles was an event of the 1971 Washington Star International tennis tournament and was played in Washington, D.C., United States from July 12 through July 18, 1971. Bob Hewitt and Frew McMillan were the defending doubles champions but did not compete together in this edition. Tom Okker and Marty Riessen won the doubles title, defeating Bob Carmichael and Ray Ruffels in the final, 7–6, 6–2.

== Draw ==
=== Key ===
- Q = Qualifier
- WC = Wild card
- LL = Lucky loser
- Alt = Alternate
- SE = Special exempt
- PR = Protected ranking
- ITF = ITF entry
- JE = Junior exempt
- w/o = Walkover
- r = Retired
- d = Defaulted
- SR = Special ranking

=== Finals ===
Semifinals
(Australia) John Alexander (Australia) Phil Dent | 3 | 4
(Australia) Bob Carmichael (Australia) Ray Ruffels | 6 | 6
(South Africa) Ray Moore (Australia) John Newcombe | 6 | 3 | 5
(Netherlands) Tom Okker (United States) Marty Riessen | 4 | 6 | 7

Final
(Australia) Bob Carmichael (Australia) Ray Ruffels | 6 | 2
(Netherlands) Tom Okker (United States) Marty Riessen | 7 | 6

=== Top half ===
First Round
(France) Pierre Barthès (Australia) Rod Laver | 6 | 7
(United States) Franklin Robbins; Unknown | 3 | 6
(United States) Roscoe Tanner; Unknown | 6 | 6
(Socialist Federal Republic of Yugoslavia) Željko Franulović (Socialist Federal Republic of Yugoslavia) Boro Jovanović | 1 | 2
(Canada) Mike Belkin (Jamaica) Richard Russell | 6 | 4 | 6
(Egypt) Ismail El Shafei (New Zealand) Brian Fairlie | 1 | 6 | 4
(Australia) John Alexander (Australia) Phil Dent | 6 | 4 | 6
(United States) John Austin (United States) Jimmy Connors | 4 | 6 | 4
(Australia) Bob Carmichael (Australia) Ray Ruffels | 7 | 7
(United States) Dick Dell (United States) Fred McNair | 5 | 6
(United States) Clark Graebner (South Africa) Frew McMillan | 6 | 6
(United States) Barry MacKay (tennis) (United States) Alex Olmedo | 2 | 1
(Australia) Bill Bowrey (Australia) Owen Davidson | 6 | 2 | 6
(United States) Roy Barth (Denmark) Torben Ulrich | 4 | 6 | 4
(Australia) Ken Rosewall (Australia) Fred Stolle | 6 | 6
(United States) Steve Faulk (United States) Armistead Neely | 2 | 1

Second Round
(France) Pierre Barthès (Australia) Rod Laver | 6 | 6
(United States) Roscoe Tanner; Unknown | 3 | 2
(Canada) Mike Belkin (Jamaica) Richard Russell | 6 | 4
(Australia) John Alexander (Australia) Phil Dent | 7 | 6
(Australia) Bob Carmichael (Australia) Ray Ruffels | 3 | 7 | 6
(United States) Clark Graebner (South Africa) Frew McMillan | 6 | 5 | 4
(Australia) Bill Bowrey (Australia) Owen Davidson
(Australia) Ken Rosewall (Australia) Fred Stolle

Quarterfinals
(France) Pierre Barthès (Australia) Rod Laver | 3 | 4
(Australia) John Alexander (Australia) Phil Dent | 6 | 6
(Australia) Bob Carmichael (Australia) Ray Ruffels | 6 | 6
(Australia) Bill Bowrey (Australia) Owen Davidson | 3 | 1

Semifinals
(Australia) John Alexander (Australia) Phil Dent | 3 | 4
(Australia) Bob Carmichael (Australia) Ray Ruffels | 6 | 6

=== Bottom half ===
First Round
(United States) Brian Gottfried (United States) Paul Gerken | 2 | 6 | 6
(United States) Arthur Ashe (United States) Dennis Ralston | 6 | 4 | 2
(Spain) Andrés Gimeno (United Kingdom) Roger Taylor | 4 | 7 | 6
(United States) Robert McKinley (United States) Dick Stockton | 6 | 5 | 3
(South Africa) Ray Moore (Australia) John Newcombe | 7 | 6
(South Africa) Terry Ryan (United Kingdom) Graham Stilwell | 5 | 3
(South Africa) Bob Maud (Australia) Allan Stone | 3 | 6 | 6
(United States) Stan Smith (United States) Erik van Dillen | 6 | 2 | 3
(United States) Bob Lutz (United States) Charlie Pasarell | 6 | 6
(United States) Mike Estep (United States) William Higgins | 3 | 2
(United States) Tom Edlefsen (United States) Frank Froehling | 6 | 1 | 7
(South Africa) Cliff Drysdale (Croatia) Nikola Pilić | 4 | 6 | 6
(United States) Jim McManus (United States) Jim Osborne | 6 | 6 | 6
(Chile) Patricio Cornejo (Chile) Jaime Fillol | 3 | 7 | 3
(Netherlands) Tom Okker (United States) Marty Riessen | 6 | 6
(United States) Fred Drilling (United States) Eugene Russo | 3 | 4

Second Round
(United States) Brian Gottfried (United States) Paul Gerken | 6 | 3 | 4
(Spain) Andrés Gimeno (United Kingdom) Roger Taylor | 4 | 6 | 6
(South Africa) Ray Moore (Australia) John Newcombe | 6 | 6
(South Africa) Bob Maud (Australia) Allan Stone | 1 | 2
(United States) Bob Lutz (United States) Charlie Pasarell | 6 | 6
(United States) Tom Edlefsen (United States) Frank Froehling | 4 | 3
(United States) Jim McManus (United States) Jim Osborne | 4 | 3
(Netherlands) Tom Okker (United States) Marty Riessen | 6 | 6

Quarterfinals
(Spain) Andrés Gimeno (United Kingdom) Roger Taylor | 6 | 5 | 6
(South Africa) Ray Moore (Australia) John Newcombe | 1 | 7 | 7
(United States) Bob Lutz (United States) Charlie Pasarell | 2 | 4
(Netherlands) Tom Okker (United States) Marty Riessen | 6 | 6

Semifinals
(South Africa) Ray Moore (Australia) John Newcombe | 6 | 3 | 5
(Netherlands) Tom Okker (United States) Marty Riessen | 4 | 6 | 7
