= 1990 Virginia Slims of Washington – Doubles =

Doubles
- 1990 Virginia Slims of Washington

Final
- Champions: (United States) Zina Garrison (United States) Martina Navratilova
- Runners-up: (United States) Ann Henricksson (South Africa) Dianne Van Rensburg
- Score: 6–0, 6–3

Details
- Draw: 14 (1WC)
- Seeds: 4

Events
Singles	Doubles
← 1989 ·	Virginia Slims of Washington	· 1991 →

Betsy Nagelsen and Pam Shriver were the defending champions, but none competed this year.

Zina Garrison and Martina Navratilova won the title by defeating Ann Henricksson and Dianne Van Rensburg 6–0, 6–3 in the final.

== Seeds ==
The top two seeds received a bye to the second round.

1. (United States) Zina Garrison / (United States) Martina Navratilova (champions)
2. (United States) Katrina Adams / (United States) Lori McNeil (semifinals)
3. (Hungary) Andrea Temesvári / (Soviet Union) Natasha Zvereva (first round)
4. (United States) Elise Burgin / (South Africa) Rosalyn Fairbank (quarterfinals)

== Draw ==
=== Key ===
- Q = Qualifier
- WC = Wild card
- LL = Lucky loser
- Alt = Alternate
- SE = Special exempt
- PR = Protected ranking
- ITF = ITF entry
- JE = Junior exempt
- w/o = Walkover
- r = Retired
- d = Defaulted
- SR = Special ranking

=== Draw ===
First round
WC	(Canada) H Kelesi (Socialist Federal Republic of Yugoslavia) M Seles	6	6
(United States) Suzanne Olson (United States) Caren Schindler	1	1
3	(Hungary) A Temesvári (Soviet Union) N Zvereva	7	2	2
(Australia) N Provis (France) N Tauziat	5	6	6
(Italy) L Ferrando (West Germany) S Hanika	4	6	6
(United States) J Goodling (United States) A Grossman	6	4	2
(United States) A Henricksson (South Africa) D Van Rensburg	6	6
(Paraguay) L Schaerer (United States) Sylvia Schenck	3	0
(United States) H Cioffi (United States) A Leand	2	0
4	(United States) E Burgin (South Africa) R Fairbank	6	6
(United States) A Smith (Australia) E Smylie	5	6	6
(United States) P Fendick (United States) K Rinaldi	7	3	3

Quarterfinals
1	(United States) Z Garrison (United States) M Navratilova	6	6
WC	(Canada) H Kelesi (Socialist Federal Republic of Yugoslavia) M Seles	2	2
(Australia) N Provis (France) N Tauziat	1	1
(Italy) L Ferrando (West Germany) S Hanika	6	6
(United States) A Henricksson (South Africa) D Van Rensburg	3	7^{7}	6
4	(United States) E Burgin (South Africa) R Fairbank	6	6^{4}	4
(United States) A Smith (Australia) E Smylie	1	5
2	(United States) K Adams (United States) L McNeil	6	7

Semifinals
1	(United States) Z Garrison (United States) M Navratilova	6	6
(Italy) L Ferrando (West Germany) S Hanika	1	3
(United States) A Henricksson (South Africa) D Van Rensburg	4	7	6
2	(United States) K Adams (United States) L McNeil	6	5	2

Final
1	(United States) Z Garrison (United States) M Navratilova	6	6
(United States) A Henricksson (South Africa) D Van Rensburg	0	3
