= 1990 Virginia Slims of Washington =

- Date: February 19–25
- Edition: 17th
- Category: Tier II
- Draw: 28S / 16D
- Prize money: $350,000
- Surface: Carpet / indoor
- Location: Washington, D.C., U.S.
- Venue: GWU Charles Smith Center

Champions

Singles
- (United States) Martina Navratilova

Doubles
- (United States) Zina Garrison / (United States) Martina Navratilova
← 1989 ·	Virginia Slims of Washington	· 1991 →

The 1990 Virginia Slims of Washington was a women's tennis tournament played on indoor carpet courts at the GWU Charles Smith Center in Washington, D.C. in the United States and was part of Tier II of the 1990 WTA Tour. It was the 17th edition of the tournament and ran from February 19 through February 25, 1990. First-seeded Martina Navratilova won the singles title, her ninth at the event.

== Finals ==
=== Singles ===
(United States) Martina Navratilova defeated (United States) Zina Garrison 6–1, 6–0

- It was Navratilova's 2nd singles title of the year and the 148th of her career.

=== Doubles ===
(United States) Zina Garrison / (United States) Martina Navratilova defeated (United States) Ann Henricksson / (South Africa) Dianne Van Rensburg 6–0, 6–3
