= 1989 Virginia Slims of Washington – Doubles =

Doubles
- 1989 Virginia Slims of Washington
- 1988 Champions: (United States) Martina Navratilova (United States) Pam Shriver

Final
- Champions: (United States) Betsy Nagelsen (United States) Pam Shriver
- Runners-up: (Soviet Union) Larisa Savchenko (Soviet Union) Natasha Zvereva
- Score: 6–2, 6–3

Details
- Draw: 16
- Seeds: 4

Events
Singles	Doubles
← 1988 ·	Virginia Slims of Washington	· 1990 →

Martina Navratilova and Pam Shriver were the defending champions of the doubles title at the Virginia Slims of Washington tennis tournament but only Shriver competed that year with Betsy Nagelsen.

Nagelsen and Shriver won in the final 6–2, 6–3 against Larisa Savchenko and Natasha Zvereva.

== Seeds ==
Champion seeds are indicated in bold text while text in italics indicates the round in which those seeds were eliminated.

1. (United States) **Betsy Nagelsen** / (United States) **Pam Shriver (champions)**
2. (Soviet Union) Larisa Savchenko / (Soviet Union) Natasha Zvereva (final)
3. (United States) Gigi Fernández / (United States) Robin White (semifinals)
4. (United States) Katrina Adams / (United States) Zina Garrison (semifinals)

== Draw ==
=== Key ===
- Q = Qualifier
- WC = Wild card
- LL = Lucky loser
- Alt = Alternate
- SE = Special exempt
- PR = Protected ranking
- ITF = ITF entry
- JE = Junior exempt
- w/o = Walkover
- r = Retired
- d = Defaulted
- SR = Special ranking

First round
1	(United States) **B Nagelsen** (United States) **P Shriver**	**6**	**6**
(United States) R Casals (Canada) H Kelesi	3	1
(United States) **A Henricksson** (United States) **W White**	**6**	**6**
(United States) M L Daniels (United States) P Louie-Harper	4	4
4	(United States) **K Adams** (United States) **Z Garrison**	**6**	**6**
(West Germany) E Pfaff (South Africa) D van Rensburg	3	2
(United States) **C Benjamin** (United States) **J Smoller**	**6**	**6**
(United States) V Brown (United States) L Hatcher	1	1
(Canada) **C Bassett-Seguso** (United States) **T Phelps**	**6**	**6**
(Soviet Union) L Meskhi (United States) K Rinaldi	3	1
(Sweden) M Lindström (United States) H Ludloff	6	**6**	2
3	(United States) **G Fernández** (United States) **R White**	**7**	4	**6**
(United States) L Antonoplis (United States) S Collins	4	1
(France) **I Demongeot** (France) **N Tauziat**	**6**	**6**
(Poland) R Baranski (United States) J Goodling	1	0
2	(Soviet Union) **L Savchenko** (Soviet Union) **N Zvereva**	**6**	**6**

Quarterfinals
1	(United States) **B Nagelsen** (United States) **P Shriver**	**6**	**7**
(United States) A Henricksson (United States) W White	1	5
4	(United States) **K Adams** (United States) **Z Garrison**	**6**	**6**
(United States) C Benjamin (United States) J Smoller	3	3
(Canada) C Bassett-Seguso (United States) T Phelps	5	1
3	(United States) **G Fernández** (United States) **R White**	**7**	**6**
(France) I Demongeot (France) N Tauziat	**6**	3	3
2	(Soviet Union) **L Savchenko** (Soviet Union) **N Zvereva**	2	**6**	**6**

Semifinals
1	(United States) **B Nagelsen** (United States) **P Shriver**	2	**6**	**6**
4	(United States) K Adams (United States) Z Garrison	**6**	3	1
3	(United States) G Fernández (United States) R White	**6**	5	5
2	(Soviet Union) **L Savchenko** (Soviet Union) **N Zvereva**	3	**7**	**7**

Final
1	(United States) **Betsy Nagelsen** (United States) **Pam Shriver**	**6**	**6**
2	(Soviet Union) Larisa Savchenko (Soviet Union) Natasha Zvereva	2	3
