= 1989 Virginia Slims of Washington =

- Date: February 13–19
- Edition: 18th
- Category: Category 5
- Draw: 32S / 16D
- Prize money: $300,000
- Surface: Carpet / indoor
- Location: Fairfax, Virginia, U.S.
- Venue: Patriot Center
- Attendance: 40,000

Champions

Singles
- (West Germany) Steffi Graf

Doubles
- (United States) Betsy Nagelsen / (United States) Pam Shriver
← 1988 ·	Virginia Slims of Washington	· 1990 →

The 1989 Virginia Slims of Washington was a women's tennis tournament played on indoor carpet courts at the Patriot Center in Fairfax, Virginia in the United States and was part of the Category 5 tier of the 1989 WTA Tour. The tournament ran from February 13 through February 19, 1989. First-seeded Steffi Graf won the singles title.

== Finals ==
=== Singles ===
(West Germany) Steffi Graf defeated (United States) Zina Garrison 6–1, 7–5

- It was Graf's 2nd singles title of the year and the 32nd of her career.

=== Doubles ===
(United States) Betsy Nagelsen / (United States) Pam Shriver defeated (Soviet Union) Larisa Savchenko / (Soviet Union) Natasha Zvereva 6–2, 6–3

- It was Nagelsen's 1st title of the year and the 19th of her career. It was Shriver's 3rd title of the year and the 119th of her career.
