= 1984 Virginia Slims of Washington – Singles =

Singles
- 1984 Virginia Slims of Washington

Final
- Champion: (Czechoslovakia) Hana Mandlíková
- Runner-up: (United States) Zina Garrison
- Score: 6–1, 6–1

Details
- Draw: 32 (1Alt)
- Seeds: 8

Events
Singles	Doubles
- Virginia Slims of Washington

Martina Navratilova was the defending champion, but did not compete this year.

Hana Mandlíková won the title by defeating Zina Garrison 6–1, 6–1 in the final.

== Seeds ==
1. (United States) Andrea Jaeger (second round)
2. (n/a)
3. (West Germany) Bettina Bunge (first round)
4. (Australia) Wendy Turnbull (second round)
5. (United States) Zina Garrison (final)
6. (Czechoslovakia) Hana Mandlíková (champion)
7. (United States) Kathleen Horvath (quarterfinals)
8. (Czechoslovakia) Helena Suková (semifinals)

== Draw ==
Key

- Q = Qualifier
- WC = Wild card
- LL = Lucky loser
- Alt = Alternate
- ITF = ITF entry
- PR = Protected ranking
- SR = Special ranking
- SE = Special exempt
- JE = Junior exempt
- JR = Junior Accelerator Programme entrant
- CO = College Accelerator Programme entrant
- NG = Next Gen Accelerator Program entrant
- w/o = Walkover
- r = Retired
- d = Defaulted

=== Finals ===
Semifinals
5	(United States) Zina Garrison	6	5	6
(United States) Pam Casale	0	7	2
6	(Czechoslovakia) Hana Mandlíková	6	7
8	(Czechoslovakia) Helena Suková	1	6

Final
5	(United States) Zina Garrison	1	1
6	(Czechoslovakia) Hana Mandlíková	6	6

=== Top half ===
First round
1	(United States) A Jaeger	6	6
(United States) S Walsh	2	3
(West Germany) C Kohde-Kilsch	7	1	2
(United States) L Bonder	6	6	6
(Switzerland) C Jolissaint	4	3
(United States) K Shaefer	6	6
(United States) K Sands	3	4
5	(United States) Z Garrison	6	6
4	(Australia) W Turnbull	6	6	6
(United Kingdom) A Hobbs	7	2	3
(France) P Paradis	2	2
(United States) P Casale	6	6
(Sweden) C Jexell	3	5
(United States) J Russell	6	7
(Bulgaria) M Maleeva	6	3	1
7	(United States) K Horvath	4	6	6

Second round
1	(United States) A Jaeger	0	1
(United States) L Bonder	6	6
(United States) K Shaefer	4	6
5	(United States) Z Garrison	6	7
4	(Australia) W Turnbull	4	7	4
(United States) P Casale	6	6	6
(United States) J Russell	4	5
7	(United States) K Horvath	6	7

Quarterfinals
(United States) L Bonder	1	3
5	(United States) Z Garrison	6	6
(United States) P Casale	6	6
7	(United States) K Horvath	2	1

Semifinals
5	(United States) Z Garrison	6	5	6
(United States) P Casale	0	7	2

=== Bottom half ===
First round
6	(Czechoslovakia) H Mandlíková	6	6
(United States) C Benjamin	4	2
(United States) T Phelps	6	6
(Italy) R Reggi	3	3
(South Africa) Y Vermaak	6	3	6
(United States) A Leand	4	6	1
(United States) B Gadusek	6	6
3	(West Germany) B Bunge	1	4
8	(Czechoslovakia) H Suková	6	7
(United States) A White	4	5
(Canada) C Bassett	7	5	5
(United States) S Collins	5	7	7
(United States) P Louie	2	3
(United States) B Potter	6	6
(West Germany) E Pfaff	6	6
Alt	(United States) Le Allen	1	1

Second round
6	(Czechoslovakia) H Mandlíková	7	6
(United States) T Phelps	6	1
(South Africa) Y Vermaak	4	7	0
(United States) B Gadusek	6	5	6
8	(Czechoslovakia) H Suková	6	6
(United States) S Collins	2	3
(United States) B Potter	6	6
(West Germany) E Pfaff	2	1

Quarterfinals
6	(Czechoslovakia) H Mandlíková	6	6
(United States) B Gadusek	2	4
8	(Czechoslovakia) H Suková	4	6	6
(United States) B Potter	6	1	3

Semifinals
6	(Czechoslovakia) H Mandlíková	6	7
8	(Czechoslovakia) H Suková	1	6
