= 1971 Washington Star International =

- Date: July 12–18
- Edition: 3rd
- Category: Grand Prix / WCT
- Draw: 64S / 32D
- Prize money: $50,000
- Surface: Clay / outdoor
- Location: Washington, D.C., United States

Champions

Singles
- (Australia) Ken Rosewall

Doubles
- (Netherlands) Tom Okker / (United States) Marty Riessen
← 1970 ·	Washington Open	· 1972 →

The 1971 Washington Star International was a men's tennis tournament and was played on outdoor clay courts. The event was the third edition of the tournament and was part of both the 1971 Grand Prix circuit and 1971 World Championship Tennis circuit. It was held in Washington, D.C., United States from July 12 through July 18, 1971. Ken Rosewall won the singles title and earned a $10,000 first prize.

== Finals ==
=== Singles ===
(Australia) Ken Rosewall defeated (United States) Marty Riessen 6–2, 7–5, 6–1

=== Doubles ===
(Netherlands) Tom Okker / (United States) Marty Riessen defeated (Australia) Bob Carmichael / (Australia) Ray Ruffels 7–6, 6–2
