= 1993 Acura U.S. Hardcourts =

- Date: July 26 – August 1
- Edition: 28th
- Category: Tier II
- Draw: 56S / 28D
- Prize money: $375,000
- Surface: Hard / outdoor
- Location: Stratton Mountain, Vermont, United States
- Venue: Stratton Mountain Sports Center

Champions

Singles
- (Spain) Conchita Martínez

Doubles
- (Australia) Elizabeth Smylie / (Czech Republic) Helena Suková
- U.S. Women's Hardcourt Championships

The 1993 Acura U.S. Hardcourts, also known by its full name Acura U.S. Women's Hardcourt Championships, was a women's tennis tournament played on outdoor hard courts at the Stratton Mountain Sports Center in Stratton Mountain, Vermont in the United States and was part of the Tier II category of the 1993 WTA Tour. The tournament had relocated from San Antonio, Texas and was upgraded from a Tier III to a Tier II event. It was the 28th edition of the tournament and was held from July 26 through August 1, 1993. First-seeded Conchita Martínez won the singles title and earned $75,000 first-prize money.

== Finals ==
=== Singles ===
(Spain) Conchita Martínez defeated (United States) Zina Garrison-Jackson 6–3, 6–2

- It was Martínez' 4th singles title of the year and the 15th of her career.

=== Doubles ===
(Australia) Elizabeth Smylie / (Czech Republic) Helena Suková defeated (Switzerland) Manuela Maleeva-Fragnière / (Argentina) Mercedes Paz 6–1, 6–2

- It was Smylie's 2nd doubles title of the year and the 33rd of her career. It was Suková's 4th doubles title of the year and the 57th of her career.
