= 1975 Virginia Slims of Washington =

- Date: January 27 – February 2
- Edition: 4th
- Category: Virginia Slims circuit
- Draw: 32S / 8D
- Prize money: $75,000
- Surface: Carpet (Sporteze) / indoor
- Location: Fairfax, Virginia, U.S.
- Venue: James Robinson School Field House

Champions

Singles
- (Czechoslovakia) Martina Navratilova

Doubles
- (France) Françoise Dürr / (Netherlands) Betty Stöve
← 1974 ·	Virginia Slims of Washington	· 1976 →

The 1975 Virginia Slims of Washington was a women's tennis tournament played on indoor carpet courts at the James Robinson School Field House in Fairfax, Virginia in the United States that was part of the 1975 Virginia Slims World Championship Series. It was the fourth edition of the tournament and was held from January 27 through February 2, 1975. Eighth-seeded Martina Navratilova won the singles title and earned $15,000 first-prize money. In the quarterfinal she had defeated Chris Evert for the first time in their rivalry, after five consecutive wins for Evert.

== Finals ==
=== Singles ===
(Czechoslovakia) Martina Navratilova defeated (Australia) Kerry Melville 6–3, 6–1

=== Doubles ===
(France) Françoise Dürr / (Netherlands) Betty Stöve defeated (Australia) Helen Gourlay / (Australia) Kerry Melville 6–3, 6–4

== Prize money ==
Event	W	F	3rd	4th	QF	Round of 16	Round of 32
Singles	$15,000	$8,000	$4,600	$3,800	$2,100	$1,100	$550

== See also ==
- 1975 Washington Star International
- 1975 Xerox Tennis Classic
