= 1979 Avon Championships of Washington =

- Date: January 1–7
- Edition: 8th
- Category: Virginia Slims circuit
- Draw: 32S / 16D
- Prize money: $125,000
- Surface: Carpet / indoor
- Location: Washington D.C., U.S.
- Venue: GWU Charles Smith Center; Capital Centre

Champions

Singles
- (United States) Tracy Austin

Doubles
- (Socialist Federal Republic of Yugoslavia) Mima Jaušovec / (Romania) Virginia Ruzici
← 1978 ·	Virginia Slims of Washington	· 1982 →

The 1979 Avon Championships of Washington was a women's tennis tournament played on indoor carpet courts (Sporteze) at the GWU Charles Smith Center and the Capital Centre in Washington D.C., District of Columbia in the United States that was part of the 1979 Avon Championships Circuit. It was the eighth edition of the tournament and was held from January 1 through January 7, 1979. Second-seeded Tracy Austin won the singles title and earned $24,000 first-prize money.

== Finals ==
=== Singles ===
(United States) Tracy Austin defeated (United States) Martina Navratilova 6–3, 6–2

- It was Tracy's first singles title of the year and the fourth of her career.

=== Doubles ===
(Socialist Federal Republic of Yugoslavia) Mima Jaušovec / (Romania) Virginia Ruzici defeated (United States) Renée Richards / (United States) Sharon Walsh 4–6, 6–2, 6–4

== Prize money ==
Event	W	F	SF	QF	Round of 16	Round of 32
Singles	$24,000	$12,000	$6,000	$3,000	$1,600	$900
