= 1977 Virginia Slims of Washington =

- Date: January 3–9
- Edition: 6th
- Category: Virginia Slims circuit
- Draw: 32S / 16D
- Prize money: $100,000
- Surface: Carpet (Sporteze) / indoor
- Location: Washington D.C., US
- Venue: GWU Charles Smith Center; Capital Centre

Champions

Singles
- (United States) Martina Navratilova

Doubles
- (United States) Martina Navratilova / (Netherlands) Betty Stöve
← 1976 ·	Virginia Slims of Washington	· 1978 →

The 1977 Virginia Slims of Washington was a women's tennis tournament played on indoor carpet courts in and near Washington D.C., District of Columbia in the United States that was part of the 1977 Virginia Slims World Championship Series. The first round and quarterfinals were held at the GWU Charles Smith Center while the semifinals and final were played at the Capital Centre. It was the sixth edition of the tournament and was held from January 3 through January 9, 1977. Third-seeded Martina Navratilova won the singles title, her second after 1975, and earned $20,000 first-prize money.

== Finals ==
=== Singles ===
(United States) Martina Navratilova defeated (United States) Chris Evert 6–2, 6–3

- It was Navratilova's 1st singles title of the year and the 8th of her career.

=== Doubles ===
(United States) Martina Navratilova / (Netherlands) Betty Stöve defeated (United States) Kristien Kemmer / (United States) Valerie Ziegenfuss 7–5, 6–2

== Prize money ==
Event	W	F	SF	QF	Round of 16	Round of 32
Singles	$20,000	$10,000	$5,400	$2,500	$1,375	$775

== See also ==
- Evert–Navratilova rivalry
