= 1972 Washington Star International =

Tennis tournament

- Date: July 17–23
- Edition: 4th
- Category: World Championship Tennis
- Draw: 64S / 16D
- Prize money: $50,000
- Surface: Clay / outdoor
- Location: Washington, D.C., United States
- Venue: Washington Tennis Stadium

Champions

Singles
- (Australia) Tony Roche

Doubles
- (Netherlands) Tom Okker / (United States) Marty Riessen
← 1971 ·	Washington Open	· 1973 →

The 1972 Washington Star International was a men's tennis tournament that was played on outdoor clay courts at the Washington Tennis Stadium in Washington, D.C. The event was part of the 1972 World Championship Tennis circuit. It was the fourth edition of the tournament and was held from July 17 through July 23, 1972. Tony Roche won the singles title after surviving a match point in the final against Marty Riessen and earned $10,000 first-prize money.

== Finals ==
=== Singles ===
(Australia) Tony Roche defeated (United States) Marty Riessen 3–6, 7–6, 6–4

=== Doubles ===
(Netherlands) Tom Okker / (United States) Marty Riessen defeated (Australia) John Newcombe / (Australia) Tony Roche 3–6, 6–3, 6–2
