= 1970 Washington Star International =

- Date: July 13–19
- Edition: 2nd
- Category: Grand Prix (Class 2)
- Draw: 64S / 32D
- Prize money: $35,000
- Surface: Clay / outdoor
- Location: Washington, D.C., United States
- Venue: Rock Creek Park

Champions

Singles
- (United States) Cliff Richey

Doubles
- (South Africa) Bob Hewitt / (South Africa) Frew McMillan
← 1969 ·	Washington Open	· 1971 →

The 1970 Washington Star International was a men's tennis tournament and was played on outdoor clay courts. It was the second edition of the tournament and was part of the 1970 Grand Prix circuit and categorized as a Class 2 event. It was held at the Rock Creek Park in Washington, D.C. from July 13 through July 19, 1970. Cliff Richey won the singles title and earned a $7,000 first prize.

== Finals ==
=== Singles ===
(United States) Cliff Richey defeated (United States) Arthur Ashe 7–5, 6–2, 6–1

=== Doubles ===
(South Africa) Bob Hewitt/ (South Africa) Frew McMillan defeated (Romania) Ilie Năstase / (Romania) Ion Țiriac 7–5, 6–0
