= 1978 Virginia Slims of Washington =

- Date: January 2–8
- Edition: 7th
- Category: Virginia Slims circuit
- Draw: 32S/16D
- Prize money: $100,000
- Surface: Carpet (Sporteze) / indoor
- Location: Washington D.C., U.S. Landover, Maryland
- Venue: GWU Charles Smith Center; Capital Centre

Champions

Singles
- (United States) Martina Navratilova

Doubles
- (United States) Billie Jean King / (United States) Martina Navratilova
← 1977 ·	Virginia Slims of Washington	· 1979 →

The 1978 Virginia Slims of Washington was a women's tennis tournament played on indoor carpet courts at the GWU Charles Smith Center and the Capital Centre in Washington D.C., District of Columbia in the United States that was part of the 1978 Virginia Slims World Championship Series. It was the seventh edition of the tournament and was held from January 2 through January 8, 1978. First-seeded Martina Navratilova won the singles title and earned $20,000 first-prize money.

== Finals ==
=== Singles ===
(United States) Martina Navratilova defeated (Netherlands) Betty Stöve 7–5, 6–4

- It was Navratilova's 1st singles title of the year and the 14th of her career.

=== Doubles ===
(United States) Billie Jean King / (United States) Martina Navratilova defeated (Netherlands) Betty Stöve / (Australia) Wendy Turnbull 6–3, 7–5

== Prize money ==
Event	W	F	SF	QF	Round of 16	Round of 32
Singles	$20,000	$10,500	$5,900	$2,800	$1,550	$850
