= 1973 Washington Star International =

- Date: July 23–29
- Edition: 5th
- Category: Grand Prix (Grade A)
- Draw: 64S / 32D
- Prize money: $75,000
- Surface: Clay / outdoor
- Location: Washington, D.C., United States
- Venue: Washington Tennis Stadium

Champions

Singles
- (United States) Arthur Ashe

Doubles
- (Australia) Ross Case / (Australia) Geoff Masters
← 1972 ·	Washington Open	· 1974 →

The 1973 Washington Star International was a men's tennis tournament that was played on outdoor clay courts at the Washington Tennis Stadium in Washington, D.C. The event was categorized as a Grade A tournament and was part of the 1973 Grand Prix circuit. It was the fifth edition of the tournament and was held from July 23 through July 29, 1973, and was the first event on the US Tour leading up to the 1973 US Open. Third-seeded Arthur Ashe won the singles title and $11,000 prize money.

== Finals ==
=== Singles ===
(United States) Arthur Ashe defeated (Netherlands) Tom Okker 6–4, 6–2

=== Doubles ===
(Australia) Ross Case / (Australia) Geoff Masters defeated (Australia) Dick Crealy / (Rhodesia) Andrew Pattison 2–6, 6–4, 6–4

== See also ==
- 1973 Union Trust Classic
