= 1972 Washington Star International – Singles =

Singles
- 1972 Washington Star International

Final
- Champion: (Australia) Tony Roche
- Runner-up: (United States) Marty Riessen
- Score: 3–6, 7–6, 6–4

Details
- Draw: 62

Events
Singles	Doubles
- Washington Open

The 1972 Washington Star International – Singles was an event of the 1972 Washington Star International tennis tournament and was played in Washington, D.C., United States from July 17 through July 23, 1972. The draw comprised 64 players. Ken Rosewall was the defending champion but did not compete in this edition. Tony Roche won the singles title, defeating Marty Riessen in the final, 3–6, 7–6, 6–4.

== Draw ==
Key

- Q = Qualifier
- WC = Wild card
- LL = Lucky loser
- Alt = Alternate
- ITF = ITF entry
- PR = Protected ranking
- SR = Special ranking
- SE = Special exempt
- JE = Junior exempt
- JR = Junior Accelerator Programme entrant
- CO = College Accelerator Programme entrant
- NG = Next Gen Accelerator Program entrant
- w/o = Walkover
- r = Retired
- d = Defaulted

=== Finals ===
Quarterfinals
(Australia) John Alexander	3	4
(Australia) Tony Roche	6	6
(United States) Cliff Richey	7	4	1
(Australia) Ray Ruffels	6	6	6
(United States) Arthur Ashe	6	4	3
(United States) Marty Riessen	1	6	6
(Egypt) Ismail El Shafei	6	0
(Australia) John Newcombe	7	6

Semifinals
(Australia) Tony Roche	6	2	6
(Australia) Ray Ruffels	3	6	3
(United States) Marty Riessen	6	6
(Australia) John Newcombe	4	0

Final
(Australia) Tony Roche	3	7	6
(United States) Marty Riessen	6	6	4

=== Top half ===
==== Section 1 ====
First Round
(Australia) John Alexander	6	6
(United States) William Higgins	3	3
(Socialist Federal Republic of Yugoslavia) Nikola Pilić	6	6
(United States) Joel Ross	2	1
(Australia) Rod Laver	6	6
(United States) Steve Krulevitz	4	2
(South Africa) Bob Maud	6	6
(United States) Lenny Schloss	1	4
(Australia) Fred Stolle	6	7
(United States) Raz Reid	2	6
(Australia) Phil Dent	6	6
(United States) Gene Hamilton	3	2
(Australia) Tony Roche	6	6
(United States) Bill Monan	1	1
(India) Jasjit Singh	2	6	6
(United States) Frank Froehling	6	1	3

Second Round
(Australia) John Alexander	7	6
(Socialist Federal Republic of Yugoslavia) Nikola Pilić	5	2
(Australia) Rod Laver	6	6
(South Africa) Bob Maud	3	3
(Australia) Fred Stolle	7	6
(Australia) Phil Dent	5	2
(Australia) Tony Roche	4	6	6
(India) Jasjit Singh	6	3	1

Third Round
(Australia) John Alexander	2	6	7
(Australia) Rod Laver	6	2	5
(Australia) Fred Stolle	6	3	1
(Australia) Tony Roche	4	6	6

Quarterfinals
(Australia) John Alexander	3	4
(Australia) Tony Roche	6	6

==== Section 2 ====
First Round
(United States) Cliff Richey	6	6
(India) Sashi Menon	1	3
(United States) Bob Lutz	6	6
(United States) Steve Tidball	2	0
(New Zealand) Brian Fairlie	6	4	6
(United States) Woody Blocher	0	6	2
(United Kingdom) Mark Cox	6	6
(United States) Larry Turville	4	2
(Australia) Ray Ruffels	6	6
(Mexico) Luis Baraldi	0	1
(United States) Roy Barth	6	4	6
(United States) Ross Walker	3	6	2
(United States) Charlie Pasarell	7	7
(United States) John Peckskamp	5	5
(United States) Ron Bohrnstedt	7	6
(United States) Tom Leonard	5	2

Second Round
(United States) Cliff Richey	4	6	6
(United States) Bob Lutz	6	0	4
(New Zealand) Brian Fairlie	6	6
(United Kingdom) Mark Cox	4	2
(Australia) Ray Ruffels	7	6
(United States) Roy Barth	5	1
(United States) Charlie Pasarell	6	6
(United States) Ron Bohrnstedt	1	2

Third Round
(United States) Cliff Richey	6	6
(New Zealand) Brian Fairlie	2	2
(Australia) Ray Ruffels	6	6	6
(United States) Charlie Pasarell	4	7	3

Quarterfinals
(United States) Cliff Richey	7	4	1
(Australia) Ray Ruffels	6	6	6

=== Bottom half ===
==== Section 3 ====
First Round
(South Africa) Cliff Drysdale
BYE
(United States) Jim Corn	7	7
(United States) Art Carrington	6	5
(United States) Arthur Ashe	4	6	6
(United States) Steve Siegel	6	4	0
(Pakistan) Haroon Rahim	6	6	6
(Argentina) Lito Álvarez	3	7	4
(Australia) Bob Carmichael	6	7
(United States) Pancho Walthall	4	6
(United Kingdom) Graham Stilwell	7	6
(United States) Ron Goldman	5	1
(United States) Marty Riessen	6	6
(United States) Steven Turner	1	4
(United Kingdom) Gerald Battrick	7	6
(United States) Ben Bishop	5	3

Second Round
(South Africa) Cliff Drysdale	6	6
(United States) Jim Corn	1	3
(United States) Arthur Ashe	6	6
(Pakistan) Haroon Rahim	1	1
(Australia) Bob Carmichael	6	6
(United Kingdom) Graham Stilwell	3	3
(United States) Marty Riessen	6	7
(United Kingdom) Gerald Battrick	1	5

Third Round
(South Africa) Cliff Drysdale	6	0
(United States) Arthur Ashe	7	6
(Australia) Bob Carmichael	2	5
(United States) Marty Riessen	6	7

Quarterfinals
(United States) Arthur Ashe	6	4	3
(United States) Marty Riessen	1	6	6

==== Section 4 ====
First Round
(Netherlands) Tom Okker	6	6
(Australia) William Lloyd	4	2
(United States) Sherwood Stewart	6	6
(Australia) Allan Stone	3	0
(Egypt) Ismail El Shafei
BYE
(United States) Fred McNair	6	6
(United States) George Hardie	4	4
(United Kingdom) Roger Taylor	7	6
(United States) Bill Lefgron	6	3
(United States) Jeff Borowiak	6	6
(United States) Fred Drilling	1	4
(Australia) John Newcombe	6	7
(United States) Franklin Robbins	1	6
(Australia) Terry Addison	6	6
(United States) Armistead Neely	4	3

Second Round
(Netherlands) Tom Okker	6	6
(United States) Sherwood Stewart	2	1
(Egypt) Ismail El Shafei	6	3	6
(United States) Fred McNair	3	6	3
(United Kingdom) Roger Taylor	3	7	6
(United States) Jeff Borowiak	6	6	3
(Australia) John Newcombe	6	6
(Australia) Terry Addison	2	3

Third Round
(Netherlands) Tom Okker	3	6	3
(Egypt) Ismail El Shafei	6	4	6
(United Kingdom) Roger Taylor	1	4
(Australia) John Newcombe	6	6

Quarterfinals
(Egypt) Ismail El Shafei	6	0
(Australia) John Newcombe	7	6
