= 1975 Washington Star International =

Tennis tournament

- Date: July 21–28
- Edition: 7th
- Category: Grand Prix (Grade AA)
- Draw: 64S / 32D
- Prize money: $100,000
- Surface: Clay / outdoor
- Location: Washington, D.C., United States

Champions

Singles
- (Argentina) Guillermo Vilas

Doubles
- (United States) Bob Lutz / (United States) Stan Smith
- Washington Open

The 1975 Washington Star International was a men's tennis tournament and was played on outdoor clay courts. It was categorized as an AA tournament and was part of the 1975 Grand Prix circuit. It was the seventh edition of the tournament and was held in Washington, D.C. from July 21 through July 28, 1975. Guillermo Vilas won the singles title and $16,000 prize money and a car in a final that was twice interrupted due to rain. Total attendance during the tournament was 55,000.

Ilie Năstase was disqualified in his quarterfinal match against Cliff Richey for failing to resume play.

== Finals ==
=== Singles ===
(Argentina) Guillermo Vilas defeated (United States) Harold Solomon 6–1, 6–3

- It was Vilas' 3rd singles title of the year and the 11th of his career.

=== Doubles ===
(United States) Bob Lutz / (United States) Stan Smith defeated (United States) Brian Gottfried / (Mexico) Raúl Ramírez 7–5, 2–6, 6–1

== See also ==
- 1975 Xerox Tennis Classic
- 1975 Virginia Slims of Washington
