= 1969 Washington Star International =

- Date: July 8–14
- Edition: 1st
- Draw: 64S / 32D
- Prize money: $25,000
- Surface: Clay / outdoor
- Location: Washington, D.C., United States
- Venue: Rock Creek Park

Champions

Singles
- (Brazil) Thomaz Koch

Doubles
- (Chile) Patricio Cornejo / (Chile) Jaime Fillol
- Washington Open

The 1969 Washington Star International was a men's tennis tournament and was played on outdoor green clay courts at the Rock Creek Park in Washington, D.C. It was the inaugural edition of the tournament and was held from July 8 through July 14, 1969. Unseeded Thomaz Koch won the singles title and earned a $5,000 first prize.

== Finals ==
=== Singles ===
(Brazil) Thomaz Koch defeated (United States) Arthur Ashe 7–5, 9–7, 4–6, 2–6, 6–4

=== Doubles ===
(Chile) Patricio Cornejo / (Chile) Jaime Fillol defeated (United States) Robert Lutz / (United States) Stan Smith 4–6, 6–1, 6–4
