= 1976 Virginia Slims of Washington =

- Date: January 18–25
- Edition: 5th
- Category: Virginia Slims circuit
- Draw: 32S / 16D
- Prize money: $75,000
- Surface: Carpet (Sporteze) / indoor
- Location: Washington D.C., US
- Venue: GWU Smith Center & Capital Center
- Attendance: 31,300

Champions

Singles
- (United States) Chris Evert

Doubles
- (Soviet Union) Olga Morozova / (United Kingdom) Virginia Wade
← 1975 ·	Virginia Slims of Washington	· 1977 →

The 1976 Virginia Slims of Washington was a women's tennis tournament played on indoor carpet courts at the GWU Smith Center & Capital Center in Washington D.C., in the United States that was part of the 1976 Virginia Slims World Championship Series. It was the fifth edition of the tournament and was held from January 18 through January 25, 1976. First-seeded Chris Evert won the singles title and earned $15,000 first-prize money.

== Finals ==
=== Singles ===
(United States) Chris Evert defeated (United Kingdom) Virginia Wade 6–2, 6–1

=== Doubles ===
(Soviet Union) Olga Morozova / (United Kingdom) Virginia Wade defeated (United States) Wendy Overton / (United States) Mona Guerrant 7–6, 6–2

== Prize money ==
Event	W	F	3rd	4th	QF	Round of 16	Round of 32
Singles	$15,000	$8,000	$4,650	$3,900	$1,900	$1,100	$550
