= 1991 Virginia Slims of Washington =

- Date: August 19–24
- Edition: 18th
- Category: Tier II
- Draw: 28S / 16D
- Prize money: $350,000
- Surface: Hard (DecoTurf) / outdoor
- Location: Washington, D.C., U.S.
- Venue: William H.G. FitzGerald Tennis Center

Champions

Singles
- (Spain) Arantxa Sánchez Vicario

Doubles
- (Czechoslovakia) Jana Novotná / (Soviet Union) Larisa Savchenko
| ← 1990 · | Virginia Slims of Washington |

The 1991 Virginia Slims of Washington was a women's tennis tournament played on outdoor hard court at the William H.G. FitzGerald Tennis Center in Washington, D.C. in the United States and was part of the Tier II category of the 1991 WTA Tour. It was the 18th and last edition of the tournament and ran from August 19 through August 24, 1991. Second-seeded Arantxa Sánchez Vicario won the singles title and earned $70,000 first-prize money.

== Finals ==
=== Singles ===
(Spain) Arantxa Sánchez Vicario defeated (Bulgaria) Katerina Maleeva 6–2, 7–5

- It was Sánchez Vicario's 1st singles title of the year and the 6th of her career.

=== Doubles ===
(Czechoslovakia) Jana Novotná / (Soviet Union) Larisa Savchenko defeated (United States) Gigi Fernández / (Soviet Union) Natasha Zvereva 5–7, 6–1, 7–6^{(12–10)}
