= Renata Kochta =

German tennis player

- Country (sports): Germany
- Born: 14 April 1973 (age 53) Prague, Czechoslovakia
- Prize money: $48,100

Singles
- Career record: 93–92
- Highest ranking: No. 301 (8 February 1993)

Doubles
- Career record: 44–47
- Highest ranking: No. 137 (29 March 1993)

Grand Slam doubles results
- Wimbledon: Q1 (1993)

Renata Kochta (born 14 April 1973) is a German former professional tennis player.

== Biography ==
Kochta is a daughter of Czechoslovak ice hockey player Jiří and is originally from Prague. Her younger sister Marketa also competed on the professional tour.

Most of Kochta's WTA Tour main draw appearances were in doubles, but she played singles at the 1993 edition of the US Hardcourts in Stratton Mountain. She had a best singles ranking of 301 in the world, which she reached in 1993.

As a doubles player she had career high ranking of 137 and featured in the qualifying draw for the 1993 Wimbledon Championships.

== ITF finals ==
=== Singles: 5 (1–4) ===
Result	No.	Date	Tournament	Surface	Opponent	Score
Win	1.	17 August 1992	Kaiserslautern, Germany	Clay	(Italy) Emanuela Sangiorgi	4–6, 6–0, 6–3
Loss	1.	31 August 1992	Bad Nauheim, Germany	Clay	(Czechoslovakia) Alena Havrlíková	6–3, 2–6, 4–6
Loss	2.	27 June 1993	Zagreb, Croatia	Clay	(Austria) Sylvia Plischke	3–6, 0–6
Loss	3.	20 June 1994	Zagreb, Croatia	Clay	(Croatia) Ivona Horvat	3–6, 6–2, 1–6
Loss	4.	16 October 1995	Langenthal, Switzerland	Carpet	(Czech Republic) Jana Macurová	4–6, 6–7^{(3)}

=== Doubles: 6 (4–2) ===
Result	No.	Date	Tournament	Surface	Partner	Opponents	Score
Loss	1.	8 August 1988	Koksijde, Belgium	Clay	(Israel) Hagit Ohayon	(Israel) Ilana Berger (Israel) Anat Varon	2–6, 6–1, 2–6
Win	1.	15 June 1992	Maribor, Slovenia	Clay	(Czech Republic) Pavlína Rajzlová	(Slovenia) Tina Križan (Slovenia) Karin Lušnic	2–6, 6–4, 6–4
Loss	2.	10 August 1992	Munich, Germany	Clay (O)	(Germany) Caroline Schneider	(Croatia) Ivona Horvat (Greece) Christina Zachariadou	4–6, 6–3, 2–6
Win	2.	29 August 1994	Bad Nauheim, Germany	Clay	(Czech Republic) Alena Vašková	(Russia) Evgenia Kulikovskaya (Ukraine) Natalia Nemchinova	6–3, 1–6, 6–4
Win	3.	20 February 1995	Carvoeiro, Portugal	Hard	(Germany) Martina Pawlik	(Italy) Katia Altilia (Spain) Paula Hermida	7–5, 6–4
Win	4.	3 September 1995	Bad Nauheim, Germany	Clay	(Bulgaria) Pavlina Nola	(Czech Republic) Dominika Górecka (Czech Republic) Petra Plačková	7–6, 6–2
