= Eleni Rossides =

American tennis player

- Full name: Eleni Rossides
- Country (sports): United States
- Born: October 23, 1967 (age 58)
- Prize money: $106,594

Singles
- Highest ranking: No. 185 (December 31, 1985)

Grand Slam singles results
- US Open: 1R (1985, 1990)

Doubles
- Highest ranking: No. 185 (July 12, 1993)

Eleni Rossides (born October 23, 1967) is a former professional tennis player from the United States.

== Biography ==
Rossides, who is of Greek descent, grew up in Washington, D.C. She is the daughter of Eugene T. Rossides, a college football player at Columbia who was drafted by the New York Giants. Her father instead studied for a law degree, serving as Assistant to the Undersecretary of the Treasury in the Eisenhower administration and later Assistant Secretary of the Treasury under President Nixon.

While still in high school, Rossides made her WTA Tour main draw debut at the 1985 Virginia Slims of Washington and came up against Martina Navratilova. The match-up had only come about when Navratilova's original opponent, Andrea Leand, had to withdraw with an allergic reaction from a bee sting.

She competed in the main draw of the 1985 US Open as a qualifier and took up a scholarship that year to attend Stanford University.

At Stanford she was the number one player on a team which won four straight championships during her time there (ultimately six in succession).

After graduating from Stanford she joined the professional tour, competing until 1999.
