= 1984 Virginia Slims of Washington =

- Date: January 2 – 8
- Edition: 13th
- Draw: 32S / 16D
- Prize money: $150,000
- Surface: Carpet / indoor
- Location: Washington, D.C., U.S.
- Venue: GWU Charles Smith Center

Champions

Singles
- (Czechoslovakia) Hana Mandlíková

Doubles
- (United States) Barbara Potter / (United States) Sharon Walsh
- Virginia Slims of Washington

The 1984 Virginia Slims of Washington was a women's tennis tournament played on indoor carpet courts at the GWU Charles Smith Center in Washington in the United States that was part of the 1983 Virginia Slims World Championship Series (Note: The 1983 Virginia Slims World Championship Series ran from January 1983 through February 1984.). It was the 13th edition of the tournament and was held from January 2 through January 8, 1984. Sixth-seeded Hana Mandlíková won the singles title.

== Finals ==
=== Singles ===
(Czechoslovakia) Hana Mandlíková defeated (United States) Zina Garrison 6–1, 6–1

- It was Mandlíková's 1st singles title of the year and the 17th of her career.

=== Doubles ===
(United States) Barbara Potter / (United States) Sharon Walsh defeated (United States) Leslie Allen / (United States) Anne White 6–1, 6–7^{(7–9)}, 6–2

- It was Potter's 1st title of the year and the 16th of her career. It was Walsh's 1st title of the year and the 25th of her career.

== Prize money ==
Event	W	F	SF	QF	Round of 16	Round of 32
Singles	$30,000	$15,000	$7,350	$3,600	$1,900	$1,100
