= 1987 Virginia Slims of Washington =

- Date: March 23–29
- Edition: 16th
- Category: Category 3
- Draw: 32S / 16D
- Prize money: $150,000
- Surface: Carpet (Supreme) / indoor
- Location: Fairfax, Virginia, United States
- Venue: Patriot Center

Champions

Singles
- (Czechoslovakia) Hana Mandlíková

Doubles
- (United States) Elise Burgin / (United States) Pam Shriver
- Virginia Slims of Washington

The 1987 Virginia Slims of Washington was a women's tennis tournament played on indoor carpet courts at the Patriot Center in Fairfax, Virginia in the United States and was part of the Category 3 tier of the 1987 WTA Tour. It was the 16th edition of the tournament and was held from March 23 through March 29, 1987. First-seeded Hana Mandlíková won the singles title and earned $30,500 in first-prize money.

== Finals ==
=== Singles ===
(Czechoslovakia) Hana Mandlíková defeated (United States) Barbara Potter 6–4, 6–2

- It was Mandlíková's 2nd singles title of the year and the 27th, and last, of her career.

=== Doubles ===
(United States) Elise Burgin / (United States) Pam Shriver defeated (United States) Zina Garrison / (United States) Lori McNeil 6–1, 3–6, 6–4
