= Washington Indoor =

Defunct tennis tournament
- Tour: USLTA Indoor circuit (1972); WCT Tour (1973–1976); Grand Prix circuit (1977–1980)
- Founded: 1972
- Abolished: 1980
- Editions: 9
- Location: Washington D.C., US; Merrifield, Virginia, US (1973); Landover, Maryland, US (1974–75)
- Venue: Charles E. Smith Center; McDonough Gymnasium (1972); Four Seasons Tennis Club (1973); Capital Centre (1974–75)
- Surface: Carpet / indoor

The Washington Indoor was a men's tennis tournament played in Washington D.C., except for the 1973 edition which was held in Merrifield, Virginia and the 1974–75 editions which were held in Landover, Maryland. The inaugural edition was part of the USLTA Indoor and Grand Prix circuits. It was played as part of the World Championship Tennis (WCT) circuit from 1973 until 1976 and the Grand Prix circuit from 1977 until 1980. The event was played on indoor carpet courts. Brian Gottfried was the only multiple singles champion, winning the title in 1977 and 1978.

== Finals ==
=== Singles ===
Year	Champions	Runners-up	Score
1972	(United States) Stan Smith	(United States) Jimmy Connors	4–6, 6–1, 6–3, 4–6, 6–1
1973	(Netherlands) Tom Okker	(United States) Arthur Ashe	6–3, 6–7^{(4–7)}, 7–6^{(7–3)}
1974	(Romania) Ilie Năstase	(Netherlands) Tom Okker	6–3, 6–3
1975	(United Kingdom) Mark Cox	(United States) Dick Stockton	6–2, 7–6
1976	(United States) Harold Solomon	(New Zealand) Onny Parun	6–3, 6–1
1977	(United States) Brian Gottfried	(United States) Robert Lutz	6–1, 6–2
1978	(United States) Brian Gottfried	(Mexico) Raúl Ramírez	7–5, 7–6^{(7–4)}
1979	(United States) Roscoe Tanner	(United States) Brian Gottfried	6–4, 6–4
1980	(United States) Victor Amaya	(Czech Republic) Ivan Lendl	6–7^{(5–7)}, 6–4, 7–5

=== Doubles ===
Year	Champions	Runners-up	Score
1972	(United States) Tom Edlefsen (United States) Cliff Richey	(United States) Clark Graebner (Brazil) Thomaz Koch	6–4, 6–3
1973	(Netherlands) Tom Okker (United States) Marty Riessen	(United States) Arthur Ashe (United States) Roscoe Tanner	4–6, 7–6, 6–2
1974	(South Africa) Bob Hewitt (South Africa) Frew McMillan	(Netherlands) Tom Okker (United States) Marty Riessen	7–6, 6–3
1975	(United States) Mike Estep (New Zealand) Jeff Simpson	(India) Anand Amritraj (India) Vijay Amritraj	7–6, 6–3
1976	(United States) Eddie Dibbs (United States) Harold Solomon	(United Kingdom) Mark Cox (South Africa) Cliff Drysdale	6–4, 7–5
1977	(United States) Robert Lutz (United States) Stan Smith	(United States) Brian Gottfried (Mexico) Raúl Ramírez	6–3, 7–5
1978	(United States) Robert Lutz (United States) Stan Smith	(United States) Arthur Ashe (United States) John McEnroe	6–7, 7–5, 6–1
1979	(United States) Robert Lutz (United States) Stan Smith	(Australia) Bob Carmichael (United States) Brian Teacher	6–4, 7–5, 3–6, 7–6
1980	(United States) Brian Teacher (United States) Ferdi Taygan	(South Africa) Kevin Curren (United States) Steve Denton	4–6, 6–3, 7–6

== See also ==
- Washington Open
- Virginia Slims of Washington
