= Jeri Ingram =

American tennis player

- Country (sports): United States
- Born: December 11, 1970 (age 54); Washington, D.C., U.S.
- Prize money: $82,649

Singles
- Highest ranking: No. 173 (August 1, 1988)

Grand Slam singles results
- Australian Open: 1R (1989)
- US Open: 1R (1993)

Doubles
- Highest ranking: No. 206 (February 7, 1994)

Jeri Ingram (born December 11, 1970) is an American former professional tennis player.

== Biography ==
Ingram was born in Washington DC and went to school in Montgomery County, Maryland at Springbrook High School. In her four-year public high school tennis career she remained unbeaten, with a 106–0 record. She played college tennis for the University of Maryland and was the ACC champion at No. 1 singles in 1989.

As a professional player, Ingram's career included main draw appearances at the 1989 Australian Open and 1993 US Open. She won four ITF singles titles and her best WTA Tour performance was a third round appearance at Stratton Mountain in 1993, with wins over Tammy Whittington and Christina Singer.

Since leaving the professional tour she has been involved in tennis education.
