= Virginia Slims of Washington =

Tournament information
- Event name: Virginia Slims of Washington (1972–78, 1983–91); Avon Championships of Washington (1979, 1982)
- Tour: WTA Tour
- Founded: 1972
- Abolished: 1991
- Editions: 18
- Location: Washington, D.C., United States
- Surface: Carpet (i) (1972–75, 1978–90); Hard (i) (1976–77); Hard (1991)

The Virginia Slims of Washington, now defunct, was a Grand Prix and WTA Tour affiliated tennis tournament played from 1972 to 1991. It was held in Washington, D.C. in the United States and played on indoor carpet courts from 1972 to 1975 and again from 1978 to 1990. From 1976 to 1977, it was played on indoor hard courts and in the final year it was played on outdoor hard courts.

The event was known by several different names. For most of its run, the tournament was called the Virginia Slims of Washington due to sponsorship by Virginia Slims. It was also known as the Colgate Championships of Washington and the Avon Championships of Washington.

Martina Navratilova was the most successful player, winning nine titles overall.

The tournament was abolished after the 1991 edition when its owners, Pro-Serv, sold it abroad.

== Finals ==
=== Singles ===
| Year | Champions | Runners-up | Score |
|---|---|---|---|
↓ Virginia Slims ↓
| 1972 | (United States) Nancy Richey | (United States) Chris Evert | 7–6^{(5–1)}, 6–2 |
| 1973 | (Australia) Margaret Court | (Australia) Kerry Melville | 6–1, 6–2 |
| 1974 | (United States) Billie Jean King | (Australia) Kerry Melville | 6–0, 6–2 |
| 1975 | (Czechoslovakia) Martina Navratilova | (Australia) Kerry Melville | 6–3, 6–1 |
| 1976 | (United States) Chris Evert | (United Kingdom) Virginia Wade | 6–2, 6–1 |
| 1977 | (Czechoslovakia) Martina Navratilova | (United States) Chris Evert | 6–2, 6–3 |
| 1978 | (Czechoslovakia) Martina Navratilova | (Netherlands) Betty Stöve | 7–5, 6–4 |
↓ Avon Championships ↓
| 1979 | (United States) Tracy Austin | (Czechoslovakia) Martina Navratilova | 6–2, 6–2 |
| 1980 | Not held (Note: In January 1980 and 1981 the season-ending Colgate Series Championships were held in Landover, Maryland.) | | |
| 1981 | Not held | | |
| 1982 | (United States) Martina Navratilova | (United States) Anne Smith | 6–2, 6–3 |
↓ Category 3 ↓
| 1983 | (United States) Martina Navratilova | (West Germany) Sylvia Hanika | 6–1, 6–1 |
Tour Events (Uncategorized)
| 1984 | (Czechoslovakia) Hana Mandlíková | (United States) Zina Garrison | 6–1, 6–1 |
| 1985 | (United States) Martina Navratilova | (Bulgaria) Manuela Maleeva | 6–3, 6–2 |
| 1986 | (United States) Martina Navratilova | (United States) Pam Shriver | 6–1, 6–4 |
↓ Category 3 ↓
| 1987 | (Czechoslovakia) Hana Mandlíková | (United States) Barbara Potter | 6–4, 6–2 |
↓ Category 5 ↓
| 1988 | (United States) Martina Navratilova | (United States) Pam Shriver | 6–0, 6–2 |
| 1989 | (Germany) Steffi Graf | (United States) Zina Garrison | 6–1, 7–5 |
↓ Tier II ↓
| 1990 | (United States) Martina Navratilova | (United States) Zina Garrison | 6–1, 6–0 |
| 1991 | (Spain) Arantxa Sánchez | (Bulgaria) Katerina Maleeva | 6–2, 7–5 |

=== Doubles ===
| Year | Champions | Runners-up | Score |
|---|---|---|---|
| 1972 | (United States) Wendy Overton (United States) Valerie Ziegenfuss | (Australia) Judy Tegart (France) Françoise Dürr | 7–5, 6–2 |
| 1973 | (United States) Rosie Casals (United States) Julie Heldman | (Australia) Kerry Harris (Australia) Kerry Melville | 6–3, 6–3 |
| 1974 | (United States) Billie Jean King (Netherlands) Betty Stöve | (France) Françoise Dürr (Australia) Kerry Harris | 6–3, 6–4 |
| 1975 | (France) Françoise Dürr (Netherlands) Betty Stöve | (Australia) Helen Gourlay (Australia) Kerry Melville | 6–3, 6–4 |
| 1976 | (Soviet Union) Olga Morozova (United Kingdom) Virginia Wade | (United States) Wendy Overton (United States) Mona Guerrant | 7–6, 6–2 |
| 1977 | (Czechoslovakia) Martina Navratilova (Netherlands) Betty Stöve | (United States) Kristien Kemmer (United States) Valerie Ziegenfuss | 7–5, 6–2 |
| 1978 | (United States) Billie Jean King (Czechoslovakia) Martina Navratilova | (Netherlands) Betty Stöve (Australia) Wendy Turnbull | 6–3, 7–5 |
| 1979 | (Socialist Federal Republic of Yugoslavia) Mima Jaušovec (Romania) Virginia Ruzici | (United States) Sharon Walsh (United States) Renée Richards | 4–6, 6–2, 6–4 |
| 1980 | Not held | | |
| 1981 | Not held | | |
| 1982 | (United States) Kathy Jordan (United States) Anne Smith | (United States) Martina Navratilova (United States) Pam Shriver | 6–2, 3–6, 6–1 |
| 1983 | (United States) Martina Navratilova (United States) Pam Shriver | (United States) Kathy Jordan (United States) Anne Smith | 4–6, 7–5, 6–3 |
| 1984 | (United States) Barbara Potter (United States) Sharon Walsh | (United States) Leslie Allen (United States) Anne White | 6–1, 3–6, 6–3 |
| 1985 | (United States) Martina Navratilova (United States) Gigi Fernández | (West Germany) Claudia Kohde-Kilsch (Czechoslovakia) Helena Suková | 6–3, 3–6, 6–3 |
| 1986 | (United States) Martina Navratilova (United States) Pam Shriver | (West Germany) Claudia Kohde-Kilsch (Czechoslovakia) Helena Suková | 6–3, 6–4 |
| 1987 | (United States) Elise Burgin (United States) Pam Shriver | (United States) Zina Garrison (United States) Lori McNeil | 6–1, 3–6, 6–4 |
| 1988 | (United States) Martina Navratilova (United States) Pam Shriver | (Argentina) Gabriela Sabatini (Czechoslovakia) Helena Suková | 6–3, 6–4 |
| 1989 | (United States) Betsy Nagelsen (United States) Pam Shriver | (Soviet Union) Natasha Zvereva (Soviet Union) Larisa Neiland | 6–2, 6–3 |
| 1990 | (United States) Zina Garrison (United States) Martina Navratilova | (United States) Ann Henricksson (South Africa) Dinky Van Rensburg | 6–0, 6–3 |
| 1991 | (Czech Republic) Jana Novotná (Soviet Union) Larisa Neiland | (United States) Gigi Fernández (Soviet Union) Natasha Zvereva | 5–7, 6–1, 7–6 |

== See also ==
- Washington Open
- Sports in Washington, D.C.
