= 1977 U.S. Clay Court Championships – Women's doubles =

Women's doubles
- 1977 U.S. Clay Court Championships

Final
- Champions: (South Africa) Linky Boshoff (South Africa) Ilana Kloss
- Runners-up: (United States) Mary Carillo (United States) Wendy Overton
- Score: 5–7, 7–5, 6–3

Events
Singles	men	women
Doubles	men	women
← 1976 ·	U.S. Clay Court Championships	· 1978 →

Linky Boshoff and Ilana Kloss retained their title by defeating Mary Carillo and Wendy Overton in the final.

== Draw ==
=== Key ===
- Q = Qualifier
- WC = Wild card
- LL = Lucky loser
- Alt = Alternate
- SE = Special exempt
- PR = Protected ranking
- ITF = ITF entry
- JE = Junior exempt
- w/o = Walkover
- r = Retired
- d = Defaulted
- SR = Special ranking

First round
(South Africa) L Boshoff (South Africa) I Kloss	6	6
(United States) B Bruning (United States) L Forood	4	1
(United States) C Meyer (Denmark) H Sparre	3	5
(South Africa) B Cuypers (South Africa) Y Vermaak	6	7
(United States) L duPont (United States) K May	6	6
(United States) R Fox (United States) K Harter	1	4
(United States) Z Liess (United States) M Struthers	3	4
(Belgium) M Gurdal (Japan) N Sato	6	6
(United States) M Hamm (West Germany) I Riedel	7	6
(United States) P Louie (United States) J Stratton	5	3
(United States) K Kuykendall (United States) K Latham	3	6	4
(United Kingdom) L Charles (United Kingdom) G Coles	6	3	6
(Uruguay) F Bonicelli (West Germany) K Ebbinghaus	3	6	7
(Australia) C Doerner (Argentina) R Giscafré	6	2	9
(Australia) L Hunt (West Germany) H Eisterlehner	6	2	2
(United States) M Carillo (United States) W Overton	3	6	6

Quarterfinals
(South Africa) L Boshoff (South Africa) I Kloss	6	6
(South Africa) B Cuypers (South Africa) Y Vermaak	3	4
(United States) L duPont (United States) K May	6	6	6
(Belgium) M Gurdal (Japan) N Sato	4	7	?
(United States) M Hamm (West Germany) I Riedel	6	4	3
(United Kingdom) L Charles (United Kingdom) G Coles	4	6	6
(Australia) C Doerner (Argentina) R Giscafré	6	2	2
(United States) M Carillo (United States) W Overton	3	6	6

Semifinals
(South Africa) L Boshoff (South Africa) I Kloss	w/o
(United States) L duPont (United States) K May
(United Kingdom) L Charles (United Kingdom) G Coles	4	2
(United States) M Carillo (United States) W Overton	6	6

Final
(South Africa) L Boshoff (South Africa) I Kloss	5	7	6
(United States) M Carillo (United States) W Overton	7	5	3
