= 1977 French Open – Women's doubles =

Women's doubles
- 1977 French Open
- 1976 Champion: (Uruguay) Fiorella Bonicelli (France) Gail Lovera

Final
- Champion: (Czechoslovakia) Regina Maršíková (United States) Pam Teeguarden
- Runner-up: (United States) Rayni Fox (Australia) Helen Gourlay
- Score: 5–7, 6–4, 6–2

Events
| Singles | men | women | | boys | girls |
| Doubles | men | women | mixed | boys | girls |
| WC Singles | men | women | quad |
| WC Doubles | men | women | quad |
| Legends | −45 | 45+ | women |
| ← 1976 · | French Open | · 1978 → |

Fiorella Bonicelli and Gail Benedetti were the defending champions but only Fiorella Bonicelli competed that year with Anna-Maria Nasuelli. Fiorella Bonicelli and Anna-Maria Nasuelli lost in the first round to Mary Carillo and Dianne Evers.

Regina Maršíková and Pam Teeguarden won in the final 5–7, 6–4, 6–2 against Rayni Fox and Helen Gourlay.

== Seeds ==
1. (South Africa) Linky Boshoff / (South Africa) Ilana Kloss (quarterfinals)
2. (Socialist Federal Republic of Yugoslavia) Mima Jaušovec / (Czechoslovakia) Renáta Tomanová (second round)
3. (South Africa) Brigitte Cuypers / (South Africa) Marise Kruger (first round)
4. (United States) Laura duPont / (United States) Janet Newberry (second round)

== Draw ==
=== Key ===
- Q = Qualifier
- WC = Wild card
- LL = Lucky loser
- Alt = Alternate
- SE = Special exempt
- PR = Protected ranking
- ITF = ITF entry
- JE = Junior exempt
- w/o = Walkover
- r = Retired
- d = Defaulted
- SR = Special ranking

=== Finals ===
Semifinals
(Czechoslovakia) Regina Maršíková (United States) Pam Teeguarden | 6 | 7
(Australia) Cynthia Doerner (Argentina) Raquel Giscafré | 3 | 5
(United Kingdom) Lesley Charles (United Kingdom) Sue Mappin | 6 | 3 | 6
(United States) Rayni Fox (Australia) Helen Gourlay | 4 | 6 | 8

Final
(Czechoslovakia) Regina Maršíková (United States) Pam Teeguarden | 5 | 6 | 6
(United States) Rayni Fox (Australia) Helen Gourlay | 7 | 4 | 2

=== Top half ===
First round
1 | (South Africa) L Boshoff (South Africa) I Kloss | 6 | 6
(Spain) M Álvarez de Mon (Spain) C Perea | 2 | 2
(United Kingdom) G Coles (United Kingdom) L Mottram | 3 | 3
(Italy) D Marzano (Australia) C O'Neil | 6 | 6
(Czechoslovakia) R Maršíková (United States) P Teeguarden | 6 | 5 | 6
(Argentina) C Casabianca (Argentina) I Madruga | 2 | 7 | 2
(Sweden) I Bentzer (United States) K May | 3 | 6 | 6
(Switzerland) SM Villaverde (Argentina) E Weisenberger | 6 | 3 | 4
(France) N Fuchs (France) F Guédy | 4 | 5
(United States) M Hamm (United States) C Reynolds | 6 | 7
(West Germany) K Ebbinghaus (West Germany) H Masthoff | 6 | 6
(United States) M Struthers (United States) C-A Thomas | 3 | 3
(Australia) C Doerner (Argentina) R Giscafré | 6 | 7
(United States) K Harter (South Africa) Y Vermaak | 3 | 6

Second round
1 | (South Africa) L Boshoff (South Africa) I Kloss | 6 | 6
(Italy) D Marzano (Australia) C O'Neil | 0 | 3
(Czechoslovakia) R Maršíková (United States) P Teeguarden | 6 | 6
(Sweden) I Bentzer (United States) K May | 4 | 1
4 | (United States) L duPont (United States) J Newberry | 4 | 6 | 3
(United States) M Hamm (United States) C Reynolds | 6 | 2 | 6
(West Germany) K Ebbinghaus (West Germany) H Masthoff | 1 | 6 | 5
(Australia) C Doerner (Argentina) R Giscafré | 6 | 2 | 7

Quarterfinals
1 | (South Africa) L Boshoff (South Africa) I Kloss | 6 | 7 | 4
(Czechoslovakia) R Maršíková (United States) P Teeguarden | 7 | 5 | 6
(United States) M Hamm (United States) C Reynolds | 6 | 2
(Australia) C Doerner (Argentina) R Giscafré | 7 | 6

Semifinals
(Czechoslovakia) R Maršíková (United States) P Teeguarden | 6 | 7
(Australia) C Doerner (Argentina) R Giscafré | 3 | 5

=== Bottom half ===
First round
(United Kingdom) L Charles (United Kingdom) S Mappin | 6 | 6
(France) D Beillan (France) R Darmon | 1 | 2
(France) P du Puy (Chile) M Rodríguez | 3 | 3
(Australia) L Hunt (Romania) F Mihai | 6 | 6
(France) S Rual (Chile) S Urroz | 2 | 7 | 2
(West Germany) H Eisterlehner (West Germany) I Riedel | 6 | 5 | 6
(Australia) C Matison (Australia) P Whytcross | 7 | 1 | 7
3 | (South Africa) B Cuypers (South Africa) M Kruger | 6 | 6 | 5
(United States) R Fox (Australia) H Gourlay | 6 | 6
(France) B Simon (France) F Thibault | 0 | 1
(Belgium) M Gurdal (Japan) N Sato | 1 | 4
(United States) B Bruning (United States) S Walsh | 6 | 6
(Uruguay) F Bonicelli (Italy) A-M Nasuelli | 5 | 6 | 5
(United States) M Carillo (Australia) D Evers | 7 | 4 | 7
(Argentina) V González (Argentina) B Villaverde | 0 | 6 | 2
2 | (Socialist Federal Republic of Yugoslavia) M Jaušovec (Czechoslovakia) R Tomanová | 6 | 3 | 6

Second round
(United Kingdom) L Charles (United Kingdom) S Mappin | 6 | 6
(Australia) L Hunt (Romania) F Mihai | 3 | 0
(West Germany) H Eisterlehner (West Germany) I Riedel | 2 | 4
(Australia) C Matison (Australia) P Whytcross | 6 | 6
(United States) R Fox (Australia) H Gourlay | 6 | 6
(United States) B Bruning (United States) S Walsh | 3 | 2
(United States) M Carillo (Australia) D Evers | 1 | 6 | 6
2 | (Socialist Federal Republic of Yugoslavia) M Jaušovec (Czechoslovakia) R Tomanová | 6 | 3 | 2

Quarterfinals
(United Kingdom) L Charles (United Kingdom) S Mappin | 4 | 6 | 6
(Australia) C Matison (Australia) P Whytcross | 6 | 2 | 4
(United States) R Fox (Australia) H Gourlay | 7 | 7
(United States) M Carillo (Australia) D Evers | 5 | 5

Semifinals
(United Kingdom) L Charles (United Kingdom) S Mappin | 6 | 3 | 6
(United States) R Fox (Australia) H Gourlay | 4 | 6 | 8
