= 1977 U.S. Clay Court Championships – Women's singles =

Women's singles
- 1977 U.S. Clay Court Championships

Final
- Champion: (United States) Laura duPont
- Runner-up: (United States) Nancy Richey
- Score: 6–4, 6–3

Events
| Singles | men | women |
| Doubles | men | women |
| ← 1976 · | U.S. Clay Court Championships | · 1978 → |

Kathy May was the defending champion but was upset in her first match against Mary Hamm. Third-seed Laura duPont won the title beating Nancy Richey in the final.

== Seeds ==
A champion seed is indicated in bold text while text in italics indicates the round in which that seed was eliminated.

1. (United States) Kathy May (first round)
2. (United States) Janet Newberry (first round)
3. (United States) **Laura duPont (champion)**
4. (South Africa) Yvonne Vermaak (second round)
5. (South Africa) Brigitte Cuypers (first round)
6. (Australia) Lesley Hunt (first round)
7. (United States) Kathy Kuykendall (second round)
8. (United States) Pam Teeguarden (first round)

== Draw ==
=== Key ===
- Q = Qualifier
- WC = Wild card
- LL = Lucky loser
- Alt = Alternate
- SE = Special exempt
- PR = Protected ranking
- ITF = ITF entry
- JE = Junior exempt
- w/o = Walkover
- r = Retired
- d = Defaulted
- SR = Special ranking

=== Finals ===
Semifinals
**(United States) Nancy Richey** | **6** | **6**
(West Germany) Iris Riedel | 3 | 3
3 | **(United States) Laura duPont** | **6** | 3 | **6**
(Australia) Cynthia Doerner | 4 | **6** | 3

Final
(United States) Nancy Richey | 4 | 3
3 | **(United States) Laura duPont** | **6** | **6**

=== Top half ===
First round
1 | (United States) K May | 1 | 2
**(United States) M Hamm** | **6** | **6**
**(West Germany) K Ebbinghaus** | **6** | **7**
(United States) M Struthers | 3 | 5
**(United States) N Richey** | 6 | **6** | **6**
(United States) M Carillo | **7** | 4 | 3
**(United States) W Overton** | **6** | 2 | **6**
5 | (South Africa) B Cuypers | 2 | **6** | 2
4 | **(South Africa) Y Vermaak** | **7** | **6**
(United States) C Meyer | 6 | 3
**(United States) P Louie** | **6** | **6**
(South Africa) L Boshoff | 4 | 3
(United States) L Forood | 3 | 3
**(West Germany) I Riedel** | **6** | **6**
(United States) K Harter | 1 | 2
8 | **(United States) P Teeguarden** | **6** | **6**

Second round
(United States) M Hamm | **6** | 4 | 4
**(West Germany) K Ebbinghaus** | 4 | **6** | **6**
**(United States) N Richey** | **6** | **6**
(United States) W Overton | 3 | 1
4 | (South Africa) Y Vermaak | **7** | 5 | 1
**(United States) P Louie** | 5 | **7** | **6**
**(West Germany) I Riedel** | 3 | **6** | **6**
8 | (United States) P Teeguarden | **6** | 2 | 4

Quarterfinals
(West Germany) K Ebbinghaus | 1 | 1
**(United States) N Richey** | **6** | **6**
(United States) P Louie | 1 | 1
**(West Germany) I Riedel** | **6** | **6**

Semifinals
**(United States) N Richey** | **6** | **6**
(West Germany) I Riedel | 3 | 3

=== Bottom half ===
First round
6 | (Australia) L Hunt | 1 | **6** | 6
**(Brazil) M Bueno** | **6** | 4 | **8**
**(West Germany) H Eisterlehner** | **6** | 5 | **6**
(United States) B Bruning | 3 | **7** | 3
**(United States) K Latham** | **7** | 2 | **6**
(United States) BA Stuart | 6 | **6** | 3
(United States) Z Liess | **6** | 3 | 0
3 | **(United States) L duPont** | 2 | **6** | **6**
7 | **(United States) K Kuykendall** | **6** | **6**
(United Kingdom) G Coles | 1 | 2
**(Australia) C Doerner** | **6** | **6**
(South Africa) I Kloss | 1 | 2
**(United Kingdom) L Charles** | 2 | **7** | **6**
(Uruguay) F Bonicelli | **6** | 6 | 2
**(Denmark) H Sparre** | **6** | **6**
2 | (United States) J Newberry | 2 | 3

Second round
**(Brazil) M Bueno** | **6** | **6**
(West Germany) H Eisterlehner | 2 | 3
(United States) K Latham | 4 | **6** | 8
3 | **(United States) L duPont** | **6** | 4 | **10**
7 | (United States) K Kuykendall | 5 | 2
**(Australia) C Doerner** | **7** | **6**
**(United Kingdom) L Charles** | **6** | 3 | **10**
(Denmark) H Sparre | 1 | **6** | 8

Quarterfinals
(Brazil) M Bueno | **7** | 4 | 2
3 | **(United States) L duPont** | 5 | **6** | **6**
**(Australia) C Doerner** | **6** | **6**
(United Kingdom) L Charles | 3 | 1

Semifinals
3 | **(United States) L duPont** | **6** | 3 | **6**
(Australia) C Doerner | 4 | **6** | 3
