= 1977 French Open – Mixed doubles =

Mixed doubles
- 1977 French Open
- 1976 Champion: (Australia) Kim Warwick (South Africa) Ilana Kloss

Final
- Champion: (United States) John McEnroe (United States) Mary Carillo
- Runner-up: (Colombia) Iván Molina (Romania) Florența Mihai
- Score: 7–6, 6–4

Details
- Draw: 24

Events
Singles	men	women		boys	girls
Doubles	men	women	mixed	boys	girls
WC Singles	men	women	quad
WC Doubles	men	women	quad
Legends	−45	45+	women
- French Open

John McEnroe and Mary Carillo defeated Iván Molina and Florența Mihai in the final, 7–6, 6–4 to win the mixed doubles tennis title at the 1977 French Open. It was both players' first major title, and Carillo's only such title.

Kim Warwick and Ilana Kloss were the reigning champions, but did not compete this year.

== Draw ==
Key

- Q = Qualifier
- WC = Wild card
- LL = Lucky loser
- Alt = Alternate
- ITF = ITF entry
- PR = Protected ranking
- SR = Special ranking
- SE = Special exempt
- JE = Junior exempt
- JR = Junior Accelerator Programme entrant
- CO = College Accelerator Programme entrant
- NG = Next Gen Accelerator Program entrant
- w/o = Walkover
- r = Retired
- d = Defaulted

=== Finals ===
Semifinals
(Colombia) Iván Molina (Romania) Florența Mihai	6	6
(Morocco) Omar Laimina (France) Dominique Beillan	4	3
(United States) John McEnroe (United States) Mary Carillo	6	6
(Australia) Cliff Letcher (Australia) Diane Evers	1	4

Final
(Colombia) Iván Molina (Romania) Florența Mihai	6	4
(United States) John McEnroe (United States) Mary Carillo	7	6

=== Top half ===
First round
(France) D Bedel (France) B Simon	6	6
(United States) P Du Pré (United States) D Du Pré	1	1
(United States) W Lofgren (Italy) A-M Nasuelli
(Argentina) T Vázquez (Argentina) R Giscafré	w/o
(Morocco) O Laimina (France) D Beillan	6	6
(Sweden) T Svensson (Sweden) I Bentzer	3	4
(Paraguay) F González (France) N Fuchs	w/o
(Sweden) J Norbäck (Sweden) N Bohm

Second round
(Colombia) I Molina (Romania) F Mihai	6	6
(France) D Bedel (France) B Simon	3	4
(France) P Beust (Uruguay) F Bonicelli	6	3	4
(Argentina) T Vázquez (Argentina) R Giscafré	2	6	6
(Chile) B Prajoux (South Africa) Y Vermaak	3	6	2
(Morocco) O Laimina (France) D Beillan	6	4	6
(United States) F McNair (United States) R Fox
(Paraguay) F González (France) N Fuchs	w/o

Quarterfinals
(Colombia) I Molina (Romania) F Mihai	6	6
(Argentina) T Vázquez (Argentina) R Giscafré	1	3
(Morocco) O Laimina (France) D Beillan	6	1	9
(Paraguay) F González (France) N Fuchs	4	6	7

Semifinals
(Colombia) I Molina (Romania) F Mihai	6	6
(Morocco) O Laimina (France) D Beillan	4	3

=== Bottom half ===
First round
(United States) J McEnroe (United States) M Carillo	6	7
(France) D Naegelen (France) F Guédy	1	5
(Chile) JR Pinto Bravo (Argentina) B Villaverde	w/o
(France) D Contet (France) P du Puy
(Mexico) E Montaño (Argentina) SM Villaverde	1	3
(Argentina) R Cano (France) R Darmon	6	6
(Australia) C Letcher (Australia) D Evers	6	6
(France) P Hagelauer (France) M Bureau	4	3

Second round
(United States) J McEnroe (United States) M Carillo	7	6
(Brazil) T Koch (Australia) C Doerner	6	3
(Chile) JR Pinto Bravo (Argentina) B Villaverde	4	1
(France) P Proisy (Czechoslovakia) R Maršíková	6	6
(Argentina) R Cano (France) R Darmon	6	6
(South Africa) J Yuill (United States) K Harter	3	1
(Australia) C Letcher (Australia) D Evers	4	6	6
(Chile) H Gildemeister (United States) P Teeguarden	6	4	2

Quarterfinals
(United States) J McEnroe (United States) M Carillo	6	6
(France) P Proisy (Czechoslovakia) R Maršíková	1	4
(Argentina) R Cano (France) R Darmon	6	5
(Australia) C Letcher (Australia) D Evers	7	7

Semifinals
(United States) J McEnroe (United States) M Carillo	6	6
(Australia) C Letcher (Australia) D Evers	1	4
