= 1977 French Open – Women's singles =

Women's singles
- 1977 French Open

Final
- Champion: (Socialist Federal Republic of Yugoslavia) Mima Jaušovec
- Runner-up: (Romania) Florența Mihai
- Score: 6–2, 6–7^{(5–7)}, 6–1

Details
- Draw: 64
- Seeds: 8

Events
Singles	men	women		boys	girls
Doubles	men	women	mixed	boys	girls
WC Singles	men	women	quad
WC Doubles	men	women	quad
Legends	−45	45+	women
← 1976 ·	French Open	· 1978 →

Mima Jaušovec defeated Florența Mihai in the final, 6–2, 6–7^{(5–7)}, 6–1 to win the women's singles tennis title at the 1977 French Open. It was her first and only major title.

Sue Barker was the reigning champion, but chose not to defend her title.

== Seeds ==
The seeded players are listed below. Mima Jaušovec is the champion; others show the round in which they were eliminated.

1. (Socialist Federal Republic of Yugoslavia) Mima Jaušovec (champion)
2. (United States) Kathy May (quarterfinals)
3. (West Germany) Helga Masthoff (third round)
4. (Czechoslovakia) Regina Maršíková (semifinals)
5. (Czechoslovakia) Renáta Tomanová (quarterfinals)
6. (Australia) Lesley Hunt (first round)
7. (United States) Janet Newberry (semifinals)
8. (United States) Nancy Richey (third round)

== Draw ==
=== Key ===
- Q = Qualifier
- WC = Wild card
- LL = Lucky loser
- r = Retired

=== Finals ===
Quarterfinals
1	(Socialist Federal Republic of Yugoslavia) Mima Jaušovec	7	6
(United States) Pam Teeguarden	5	4
4	(Czechoslovakia) Regina Maršíková	7	6	6
5	(Czechoslovakia) Renáta Tomanová	6	7	3
(South Africa) Linky Boshoff	3	6	5
(Romania) Florența Mihai	6	4	7
7	(United States) Janet Newberry	6	5	6
2	(United States) Kathy May	4	7	2

Semifinals
1	(Socialist Federal Republic of Yugoslavia) Mima Jaušovec	6	3	6
4	(Czechoslovakia) Regina Maršíková	1	6	3
(Romania) Florența Mihai	7	6
7	(United States) Janet Newberry	6	3

Finals
1	(Socialist Federal Republic of Yugoslavia) Mima Jaušovec	6	6	6
(Romania) Florența Mihai	2	7	1

=== Earlier rounds ===
==== Section 1 ====
First round
1	(Socialist Federal Republic of Yugoslavia) Jaušovec	6	6
(Italy) Simmonds	3	3
(Sweden) Bentzer	6	6	6
(Japan) Sato	7	4	3
Q	(Chile) Urroz	4	7	6
(United Kingdom) Coles	6	6	2
(Australia) Whytcross	6	6
(United States) Forood	1	0
8	(United States) Richey	6	6
(United Kingdom) Tyler	0	3
(Uruguay) Bonicelli	6	6
(United States) Louie	4	3
Q	(United States) Ganz	7	5	6
(United States) Reynolds	6	7	4
(United States) Teeguarden	7	7
(South Africa) Harford	5	6

Second round
1	(Socialist Federal Republic of Yugoslavia) Jaušovec	6	6
(Sweden) Bentzer	2	1
Q	(Chile) Urroz	1	2
(Australia) Whytcross	6	6
8	(United States) Richey	6	5	6
(Uruguay) Bonicelli	4	7	1
Q	(United States) Ganz	4	6	5
(United States) Teeguarden	6	4	7

Third round
1	(Socialist Federal Republic of Yugoslavia) Jaušovec	6	6
(Australia) Whytcross	2	0
8	(United States) Richey	5	6	3
(United States) Teeguarden	7	4	6

Quarterfinals
1	(Socialist Federal Republic of Yugoslavia) Jaušovec	7	6
(United States) Teeguarden	5	4

==== Section 2 ====
First round
4	(Czechoslovakia) Maršíková	7	6
(South Africa) Kruger	5	4
(Argentina) Giscafré	6	6
(United States) Walsh	2	3
(South Africa) Vermaak	6	6
(United States) Struthers	2	3
(Hungary) Pinterová	6	6
(United States) Fox	4	2
5	(Czechoslovakia) Tomanová	6	6
(United Kingdom) Thompson	3	4
Q	(Spain) Perea	6	6
Q	(Japan) Hatanaka	4	4
(South Africa) Cuypers	5	7	6
Q	(France) Rual	7	6	0
(France) Thibault	7	7
(Australia) Doerner	6	6

Second round
4	(Czechoslovakia) Maršíková	6	6
(Argentina) Giscafré	4	2
(South Africa) Vermaak	6	6
(Hungary) Pinterová	4	2
5	(Czechoslovakia) Tomanová	6	7
Q	(Spain) Perea	1	5
(South Africa) Cuypers	6	6
(France) Thibault	4	4

Third round
4	(Czechoslovakia) Maršíková	6	6
(South Africa) Vermaak	2	4
5	(Czechoslovakia) Tomanová	6	6
(South Africa) Cuypers	3	4

Quarterfinals
4	(Czechoslovakia) Maršíková	7	6	6
5	(Czechoslovakia) Tomanová	6	7	3

==== Section 3 ====
First round
(United Kingdom) Mappin	6	6
(United States) Hamm	4	4
(West Germany) Ebbinghaus	6	6
(United States) Redondo	1	1
(South Africa) Boshoff	7	6
(United Kingdom) Fayter	5	1
Q	(Argentina) González	6	6
6	(Australia) Hunt	0	0
(United Kingdom) Charles	6	4	10
Q	(Argentina) Casabianca	1	6	8
(Romania) Mihai	6	6
(France) Guédy	3	3
(United States) Carillo	6	6
(New Zealand) Connor	4	3
3	(West Germany) Masthoff	6	6
(Belgium) Gurdal	2	4

Second round
(United Kingdom) Mappin	6	6
(West Germany) Ebbinghaus	3	4
(South Africa) Boshoff	4	6	6
Q	(Argentina) González	6	3	3
(United Kingdom) Charles	6	3	3
(Romania) Mihai	4	6	6
(United States) Carillo	6	1	3
3	(West Germany) Masthoff	1	6	6

Third round
(United Kingdom) Mappin	7	5	2
(South Africa) Boshoff	5	7	6
(Romania) Mihai	3	6	8
3	(West Germany) Masthoff	6	3	6

Quarterfinals
(South Africa) Boshoff	3	6	5
(Romania) Mihai	6	4	7

==== Section 4 ====
First round
(United States) Du Pont	6	2	6
(France) Fuchs	1	6	2
(West Germany) Riedel	6	6
(South Africa) Kloss	4	0
(West Germany) Eisterlehner	7	7
(United States) Bruning	6	6
7	(United States) Newberry	6	6
(France) Simon	3	4
(Australia) Gourlay	6	6
LL	(Australia) O'Neil	3	1
(United Kingdom) Mottram	6	6
(United States) Meyer	3	2
Q	(Czechoslovakia) Strachoňová	6	6
(United States) Harter	3	3
2	(United States) May	6	6
(Australia) Evers	4	4

Second round
(United States) Du Pont	6	6
(West Germany) Riedel	1	2
(West Germany) Eisterlehner	3	4
7	(United States) Newberry	6	6
(Australia) Gourlay	6	6
(United Kingdom) Mottram	0	2
Q	(Czechoslovakia) Strachoňová	6	2
2	(United States) May	7	6

Third round
(United States) Du Pont	3	5
7	(United States) Newberry	6	7
(Australia) Gourlay	2	2
2	(United States) May	6	6

Quarterfinals
7	(United States) Newberry	6	5	6
2	(United States) May	4	7	2

Preceded by 1977 Australian Open (January) – Women's singles	Grand Slam women's singles	Succeeded by 1977 Wimbledon Championships – Women's singles
