= Beatriz Villaverde =

Argentine tennis player

- Full name: Beatriz Isabelle Villaverde
- Country (sports): Argentina
- Born: 5 June 1958 (age 68)
- Plays: Right-handed

Grand Slam singles results
- French Open: Q2 (1977)

Grand Slam doubles results
- French Open: 1R (1977)

Grand Slam mixed doubles results
- French Open: 2R (1977)

Beatriz Isabelle Villaverde (born 5 June 1958) is an Argentine former professional tennis player Who has specialised in doubles.

She played in doubles at the French Open in 1977. Her partner in women's doubles, Argentina Viviana Segal lost in the first round to Yugoslavian Mima Jaušovec and Czechoslovak Renáta Tomanová. Her partner in mixed doubles, Jaime Pinto Bravo lost in the Second round to French Patrick Proisy and Czechoslovak Regina Maršíková.

== Career finals ==
=== Doubles (5–5) ===
Result	No.	Date	location	Surface	Partner	Opponents	Score
Loss	1.	Oct 1975	Madrid, Spain	Clay	(Argentina) Susana Maria Villaverde	(West Germany) Heidi Eisterlehner (West Germany) Iris Riedel-Kühn	4–6, 4–6
Win	1.	Jun 1976	Sheffield, United Kingdom	Grass	(Australia) Wendy Paish	(United Kingdom) Cathy Drury (United Kingdom) Lynn Robinson	6–4, 6–3
Loss	2.	Sep 1979	Madrid, Spain	Clay	(Switzerland) Susana Maria Villaverde	(United Kingdom) Kate Brasher (Sweden) Lena Sandin	1–6, 3–6
Win	2.	Sep 1979	Naples, Italy	Clay	(Switzerland) Susana Maria Villaverde	(Italy) Monica Giorgi (Italy) Graziela Perna	6–4, 3–6, 6–4
Loss	3.	Aug 1981	Nicolosi, Italy	Clay	(Argentina) Andrea Tiezzi	(Poland) Iwona Kuczyńska (Italy) Sabina Simmonds	3–6, 1–6
Loss	4.	Apr 1982	Taranto, Italy	Clay	(Sweden) Catrin Jexell	(Bulgaria) Manuela Maleeva (Socialist Federal Republic of Yugoslavia) Renata Šašak	5–7, 6–3, 2–6
Win	3.	Sep 1982	Bad Hersfeld, West Germany	Clay	(Socialist Federal Republic of Yugoslavia) Renata Šašak	(Czechoslovakia) Nataša Piskáčková (Poland) Dorota Dziekońska	6–2, 6–3
Win	4.	Jul 1984	Sezze, Italy	Clay	(Italy) Antonella Canapi	(Italy) Patrizia Murgo (Argentina) Barbara Romanò	3–6, 7–5, 6–1
Loss	5.	Aug 1984	Rheda-Wiedenbrück, West Germany	Clay	(Argentina) Andrea Tiezzi	(Czechoslovakia) Andrea Holíková (Czechoslovakia) Olga Votavová	5–7, 4–6
Win	5.	Sep 1984	Bad Hersfeld, West Germany	Clay	(Socialist Federal Republic of Yugoslavia) Renata Šašak	(Australia) Vicki Marler (Australia) Miranda Yates	6–4, 7–6
