= Javier Soler =

Javier Soler may refer to:

- Javier Soler (tennis) (born 1955), Spanish tennis player
- Javier Soler (footballer) (born 1997), Spanish footballer
