= 1977 French Open – Men's doubles =

Men's doubles
- 1977 French Open

Final
- Champion: (United States) Brian Gottfried (Mexico) Raúl Ramírez
- Runner-up: (Poland) Wojciech Fibak (Czechoslovakia) Jan Kodeš
- Score: 7–6, 4–6, 6–3, 6–4

Details
- Draw: 64
- Seeds: 8

Events
Singles	men	women		boys	girls
Doubles	men	women	mixed	boys	girls
WC Singles	men	women	quad
WC Doubles	men	women	quad
Legends	−45	45+	women
← 1976 ·	French Open	· 1978 →

Fred McNair and Sherwood Stewart were the defending champions but lost in the first round to Greg Halder and Dale Power.

Brian Gottfried and Raúl Ramírez won in the final 7–6, 4–6, 6–3, 6–4 against Wojciech Fibak and Jan Kodeš.

== Seeds ==
1. (United States) Brian Gottfried / (Mexico) Raúl Ramírez (champions)
2. (United States) Bob Lutz / (United States) Stan Smith (semifinals)
3. (South Africa) Bob Hewitt / (Romania) Ilie Năstase (semifinals)
4. (United States) Fred McNair / (United States) Sherwood Stewart (first round)
5. (Australia) Phil Dent / (Australia) Kim Warwick (first round)
6. (Italy) Paolo Bertolucci / (Italy) Adriano Panatta (quarterfinals)
7. (Poland) Wojciech Fibak / (Czechoslovakia) Jan Kodeš (final)
8. (West Germany) Jürgen Fassbender / (West Germany) Karl Meiler (quarterfinals)

== Draw ==
=== Key ===
- Q = Qualifier
- WC = Wild card
- LL = Lucky loser
- Alt = Alternate
- ITF = ITF entry
- PR = Protected ranking
- SR = Special ranking
- SE = Special exempt
- JE = Junior exempt
- JR = Junior Accelerator Programme entrant
- CO = College Accelerator Programme entrant
- NG = Next Gen Accelerator Program entrant
- w/o = Walkover
- r = Retired
- d = Defaulted

=== Finals ===
Quarterfinals
1	(United States) Brian Gottfried (Mexico) Raúl Ramírez	6	7
(Switzerland) Colin Dowdeswell (Australia) Chris Kachel	2	6
3	(South Africa) Bob Hewitt (Romania) Ilie Năstase	6	6
6	(Italy) Paolo Bertolucci (Italy) Adriano Panatta	2	4
7	(Poland) Wojciech Fibak (Czechoslovakia) Jan Kodeš	6	6
(Australia) Colin Dibley (Australia) Mark Edmondson	2	3
8	(West Germany) Jürgen Fassbender (West Germany) Karl Meiler	3	2
2	(United States) Bob Lutz (United States) Stan Smith	6	6

Semifinals
1	(United States) Brian Gottfried (Mexico) Raúl Ramírez	6	6
3	(South Africa) Bob Hewitt (Romania) Ilie Năstase	4	3
7	(Poland) Wojciech Fibak (Czechoslovakia) Jan Kodeš	6	6
2	(United States) Bob Lutz (United States) Stan Smith	4	4

Final
1	(United States) Brian Gottfried (Mexico) Raúl Ramírez	7	4	6	6
7	(Poland) Wojciech Fibak (Czechoslovakia) Jan Kodeš	6	6	3	4

=== Top half ===
==== Section 1 ====
First round
1	(United States) B Gottfried (Mexico) R Ramírez	6	6
(Czechoslovakia) F Pála (Hungary) B Taróczy	1	4
(Argentina) JL Clerc (Brazil) C Kirmayr	6	1
(Czechoslovakia) P Huťka (Czechoslovakia) J Šimbera	7	6
(France) P Barthès (France) D Naegelen	6	6
(Australia) P McNamara (Australia) S Myers	2	4
(Socialist Federal Republic of Yugoslavia) Ž Franulović (Socialist Federal Republic of Yugoslavia) N Pilić	2	7	6
(South Africa) R Moore (United States) B Scanlon	6	6	1
(Switzerland) C Dowdeswell (Australia) C Kachel	6	0	6
(Argentina) E Álvarez (United States) B Teacher	2	6	3
(France) C Casa (France) J Thamin	7	6
(South Africa) D Joubert (South Africa) W Prinsloo	5	3
(France) P Beust (France) D Contet	4	3
(United States) J Borowiak (United States) B Martin	6	6
(United States) J Delaney (India) S Menon	6	3	6
5	(Australia) P Dent (Australia) K Warwick	4	6	3

Second round
1	(United States) B Gottfried (Mexico) R Ramírez	6	6
(Czechoslovakia) P Huťka (Czechoslovakia) J Šimbera	1	2
(France) P Barthès (France) D Naegelen	2	2
(Socialist Federal Republic of Yugoslavia) Ž Franulović (Socialist Federal Republic of Yugoslavia) N Pilić	6	6
(Switzerland) C Dowdeswell (Australia) C Kachel	7	6
(France) C Casa (France) J Thamin	5	3
(United States) J Borowiak (United States) B Martin	6	6
(United States) J Delaney (India) S Menon	4	2

Third round
1	(United States) B Gottfried (Mexico) R Ramírez	6	6	6
(Socialist Federal Republic of Yugoslavia) Ž Franulović (Socialist Federal Republic of Yugoslavia) N Pilić	7	3	2
(Switzerland) C Dowdeswell (Australia) C Kachel	6	7
(United States) J Borowiak (United States) B Martin	4	5

Quarterfinals
1	(United States) B Gottfried (Mexico) R Ramírez	6	7
(Switzerland) C Dowdeswell (Australia) C Kachel	2	6

==== Section 2 ====
First round
3	(South Africa) B Hewitt (Romania) I Năstase	6	6
(United States) P Fleming (United States) G Mayer	4	4
(United States) D Bohrnstedt (United States) M Machette	6	2
(Spain) A Muñoz (Spain) J Soler	7	6
(France) É Deblicker (France) P Proisy	4	6	7
(Brazil) T Koch (Argentina) T Vázquez	6	4	5
(Colombia) Á Betancur (Colombia) I Molina	2	5
(South Africa) B Bertram (South Africa) B Mitton	6	7
(France) P Dominguez (France) F Jauffret	6	6
(United States) E Friedler (United States) J Karzen	1	4
(Chile) H Gildemeister (Paraguay) F González	6	7
(Switzerland) H Günthardt (United States) H Hoyt	4	6
(United States) J McEnroe (Ecuador) R Ycaza	4	6	6
(United States) H Bunis (South Africa) D Schneider	6	4	3
(Argentina) J Ganzábal (France) J-L Haillet	4	4
6	(Italy) P Bertolucci (Italy) A Panatta	6	6

Second round
3	(South Africa) B Hewitt (Romania) I Năstase	6	6
(Spain) A Muñoz (Spain) J Soler	2	4
(France) É Deblicker (France) P Proisy	5	6	6
(South Africa) B Bertram (South Africa) B Mitton	7	2	2
(France) P Dominguez (France) F Jauffret	5	6	3
(Chile) H Gildemeister (Paraguay) F González	7	3	6
(United States) J McEnroe (Ecuador) R Ycaza	6	1
6	(Italy) P Bertolucci (Italy) A Panatta	7	6

Third round
3	(South Africa) B Hewitt (Romania) I Năstase	6	6	6
(France) É Deblicker (France) P Proisy	7	2	1
(Chile) H Gildemeister (Paraguay) F González	6	4	3
6	(Italy) P Bertolucci (Italy) A Panatta	4	6	6

Quarterfinals
3	(South Africa) B Hewitt (Romania) I Năstase	6	6
6	(Italy) P Bertolucci (Italy) A Panatta	2	4

=== Bottom half ===
==== Section 3 ====
First round
7	(Poland) W Fibak (Czechoslovakia) J Kodeš	7	6
(Australia) D Crealy (United States) J Whitlinger	5	4
(United States) S Krulevitz (United States) T Waltke	5	1
(United States) W Lofgren (Sweden) T Svensson	7	6
(United States) V Amaya (United States) C Hagey	6	6
(France) H Gauvain (France) C Roger-Vasselin	1	2
(France) J-F Caujolle (Spain) J Higueras	3	3
(Argentina) R Cano (Chile) B Prajoux	6	6
(Australia) C Dibley (Australia) M Edmondson	6	6
(South Africa) R Chappell (South Africa) R Venter	3	3
(Venezuela) J Andrew (Bolivia) R Benavides	5	6
(France) C Freyss (France) Y Noah	7	7
(Australia) E Ewert (Australia) J Trickey	7	4	5
(United States) Tim Gullikson (United States) Tom Gullikson	6	6	7
(Canada) G Halder (Canada) D Power	4	6	6
4	(United States) F McNair (United States) S Stewart	6	4	4

Second round
7	(Poland) W Fibak (Czechoslovakia) J Kodeš	7	6
(United States) W Lofgren (Sweden) T Svensson	5	4
(United States) V Amaya (United States) C Hagey	6	7
(Argentina) R Cano (Chile) B Prajoux	3	6
(Australia) C Dibley (Australia) M Edmondson	4	6	6
(France) C Freyss (France) Y Noah	6	0	3
(United States) Tim Gullikson (United States) Tom Gullikson	6	4	6
(Canada) G Halder (Canada) D Power	2	6	1

Third round
7	(Poland) W Fibak (Czechoslovakia) J Kodeš	6	6
(United States) V Amaya (United States) C Hagey	4	3
(Australia) C Dibley (Australia) M Edmondson	6	6
(United States) Tim Gullikson (United States) Tom Gullikson	3	3

Quarterfinals
7	(Poland) W Fibak (Czechoslovakia) J Kodeš	6	6
(Australia) C Dibley (Australia) M Edmondson	2	3

==== Section 4 ====
First round
8	(West Germany) J Fassbender (West Germany) K Meiler	6	6
(France) B Fritz (France) G Goven	3	4
(United States) P DuPré (United States) N Saviano	6	6
(Argentina) A Gattiker (Chile) J Núñez	2	3
(Chile) Á Fillol (Chile) J Fillol	4	6	6
(Brazil) JE Mandarino (Chile) P Rodríguez	6	2	2
(United States) R Fisher (United States) J McManus	5	6	2
(Australia) P Kronk (Australia) C Letcher	7	4	6
(Egypt) I El Shafei (Socialist Federal Republic of Yugoslavia) N Špear	7	6
(Australia) A Gardiner (Australia) P McNamee	5	4
(West Germany) P Elter (Czechoslovakia) P Složil	3	6
(New Zealand) C Lewis (New Zealand) R Simpson	6	7
(Mexico) E Montaño (South Africa) J Yuill	6	6
(Argentina) E Caviglia (Argentina) F Dalla Fontana	2	4
(Sweden) J Norbäck (Sweden) D Palm	5	1
2	(United States) B Lutz (United States) S Smith	7	6

Second round
8	(West Germany) J Fassbender (West Germany) K Meiler	6	7
(United States) P DuPré (United States) N Saviano	3	6
(Chile) Á Fillol (Chile) J Fillol	2	6	6
(Australia) P Kronk (Australia) C Letcher	6	4	2
(Egypt) I El Shafei (Socialist Federal Republic of Yugoslavia) N Špear	4	2
(New Zealand) C Lewis (New Zealand) R Simpson	6	6
(Mexico) E Montaño (South Africa) J Yuill	1	6	10
2	(United States) B Lutz (United States) S Smith	6	3	12

Third round
8	(West Germany) J Fassbender (West Germany) K Meiler	6	7
(Chile) Á Fillol (Chile) J Fillol	3	5
(New Zealand) C Lewis (New Zealand) R Simpson	2	2
2	(United States) B Lutz (United States) S Smith	6	6

Quarterfinals
8	(West Germany) J Fassbender (West Germany) K Meiler	3	2
2	(United States) B Lutz (United States) S Smith	6	6
