= Florența Mihai =

Romanian tennis player (1955–2015)

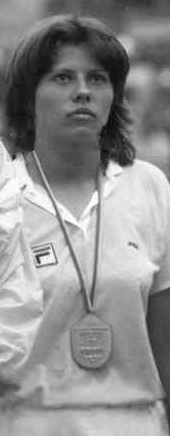
- Florența Mihai at the 1981 Summer Universiade
- Country (sports): Romania
- Born: 2 September 1955
- Died: 14 October 2015 (aged 60)
- Height: 1.65 m (5 ft 5 in)
- Plays: Right-handed

Singles
- Career titles: 1
- Highest ranking: No. 29 (February 1978)

Grand Slam singles results
- French Open: F (1977)
- Wimbledon: 2R (1977)
- US Open: 3R (1977)

Doubles

Grand Slam doubles results
- French Open: QF (1976, 1978)

Grand Slam mixed doubles results
- French Open: F (1977)
Medal record
Representing Romania
Summer Universiade
Gold medal – first place	1977 Sofia	Doubles
Gold medal – first place	1979 Mexico City	Doubles
Gold medal – first place	1981 Bucharest	Doubles

Florența Mihai (Romanian pronunciation: [floˈrent͡sa miˈhaj]; 2 September 1955 – 14 October 2015) was a professional tennis player from Romania.

She was the runner-up in two events at the 1977 French Open. She lost in the singles final to Mima Jaušovec in three sets, and with partner Iván Molina, lost in the mixed doubles final to John McEnroe and Mary Carillo.

With Virginia Ruzici, Mihai won gold medals in the doubles at Summer Universiades in 1977, 1979, and 1981.

== Grand Slam finals ==
=== Singles: 1 (0–1) ===
Result	Year	Championship	Surface	Opponent	Score
Loss	1977	French Open	Clay	(Socialist Federal Republic of Yugoslavia) Mima Jaušovec	2–6, 7–6^{(7–5)}, 1–6

=== Mixed doubles: 1 (0–1) ===
Result	Year	Championship	Surface	Partner	Opponents	Score
Loss	1977	French Open	Clay	(Colombia) Iván Molina	(United States) Mary Carillo (United States) John McEnroe	6–7, 3–6

== WTA finals ==
=== Singles (1–1) ===
Winner – Legend Grand Slam tournaments (0–1) WTA Tour Championships (0–0) Virginia Slims, Avon, Other (0–0)	Titles by surface Hard (0–0) Grass (0–0) Clay (0–0) Carpet (0–0)

Result	W/L	Date	Tournament	Surface	Opponent	Score
Loss	0–1	May 1977	French Open	Clay	(Socialist Federal Republic of Yugoslavia) Mima Jaušovec	2–6, 7–6^{(7–5)}, 1–6
Win	1–1	Aug 1977	Båstad, Sweden	Clay	(United States) Mary Struthers	6–4, 6–4

=== Doubles (1–4) ===
Result	W/L	Date	Tournament	Surface	Partner	Opponents	Score
Loss	0–1	Feb 1976	Akron, United States	Carpet (i)	(United Kingdom) Glynis Coles	(South Africa) Brigitte Cuypers (United States) Mona Guerrant	4–6, 6–7
Win	1–1	Oct 1976	Barcelona, Spain	Clay	(Romania) Virginia Ruzici	(France) Nathalie Fuchs (Belgium) Michèle Gurdal	6–2, 6–4
Loss	1–2	Aug 1977	Båstad, Sweden	Clay	(Sweden) Helena Anliot	(Australia) Cynthia Doerner (Argentina) Raquel Giscafré	2–6, 5–7
Loss	1–3	May 1978	Rome, Italy	Clay	(United States) Betsy Nagelsen	(Socialist Federal Republic of Yugoslavia) Mima Jaušovec (Romania) Virginia Ruzici	2–6, 6–2, 6–7
Loss	1–4	Jul 1978	Kitzbühel, Austria	Clay	(Czechoslovakia) Regina Maršíková	(Romania) Virginia Ruzici (Czechoslovakia) Renáta Tomanová	5–7, 2–6

== ITF finals ==
=== Singles (5–8) ===
Result	No.	Date	Tournament	Surface	Opponent	Score
Loss	1.	21 April 1974	Nice, France	Clay	(Romania) Judith Gohn	6–7, 4–6
Loss	2.	19 January 1975	Austin, United States	Hard	(Australia) Wendy Gilchrist	6–4, 6–7, 3–6
Win	3.	26 January 1975	Houston, United States	Hard	(United States) Pamela Richmond-Champagne	3–6, 6–2, 7–6
Loss	4.	15 February 1975	Amarillo, United States	Hard	(United States) Beth Norton	2–6, 4–6
Win	5.	9 March 1975	Tyler, United States	Hard	(United States) Bunny Bruning	6–3, 6–3
Win	6.	6 February 1977	Port Chester, United States	Hard (i)	(United States) Betsy Nagelsen	6–4, 3–6, 6–4
Loss	7.	13 March 1977	Pensacola, United States	Hard	(United States) Betsy Nagelsen	4–6, 5–7
Loss	8.	20 March 1977	Hilton Head, United States	Clay	(United States) Betsy Nagelsen	3–6, 4–6
Loss	9.	1 March 1981	Ilkley, United Kingdom	Clay	(United Kingdom) Kate Brasher	4–6, 4–6
Win	10.	8 March 1981	Bournemouth, United Kingdom	Clay	(United Kingdom) Lesley Charles	5–7, 6–1, 6–1
Loss	11.	12 April 1981	Catania, Italy	Clay	(Czechoslovakia) Lea Plchová	7–5, 1–6, 4–6
Loss	12.	9 May 1981	Chichester, United Kingdom	Clay	(South Africa) Rene Uys	6–4, 6–3
Win	13.	14 September 1981	Liège, Belgium	Clay	(Netherlands) Yvette Flu	6–2, 6–2

=== Doubles (11–7) ===
Result	No.	Date	Tournament	Surface	Partner	Opponents	Score
Win	1.	21 April 1974	Nice, France	Clay	(Romania) Judith Gohn	(Netherlands) Marijke Schaar (France) Jeanne Venturino	2–6, 6–3 [10–8]
Loss	2.	23 September 1974	Bucharest, Romania	Clay	(Romania) Simona Nunweiler	(Romania) Virginia Ruzici (Romania) Mariana Simionescu	2–6, 2–6
Win	3.	15 February 1975	Amarillo, United States	Hard	(United States) Robin Harris	(United States) Heather Dahlgren (Canada) Vera Komar	6–3, 7–6
Win	4.	9 March 1975	Tyler, United States	Hard	(Japan) Naoko Sato	(United States) Bunny Bruning (United States) Sue Eastman	W/O
Win	5.	17 October 1976	Madrid, Spain	Clay	(Romania) Virginia Ruzici	(Czechoslovakia) Regina Maršíková (Czechoslovakia) Renáta Tomanová	6–4, 5–7, 6–2
Loss	6.	6 March 1977	Jacksonville, United States	Hard	(United Kingdom) Glynis Coles	(South Africa) Ilana Kloss (United States) Betsy Nagelsen	6–7, 4–6
Win	7.	28 January 1980	Boise, United States	Hard (i)	(United States) Mary Carillo	(United States) Diane Desfor (United States) Barbara Hallquist	6–1, 6–4
Loss	8.	17 August 1980	Dachau, West Germany	Clay	(United Kingdom) Cathy Drury	(West Germany) Claudia Kohde-Kilsch (West Germany) Eva Pfaff	2–6, 0–6
Win	9.	5 April 1981	Napoli, Italy	Clay	(Italy) Sabina Simmonds	(Sweden) Nina Bohm (Sweden) Åsa Flodin	7–6, 6–4
Loss	10.	12 April 1981	Catania, Italy	Clay	(Italy) Sabina Simmonds	(Czechoslovakia) Marcela Skuherská (Czechoslovakia) Lea Plchová	2–6, 3–6
Loss	11.	19 April 1981	Taranto, Italy	Clay	(Italy) Sabina Simmonds	(Czechoslovakia) Marcela Skuherská (Czechoslovakia) Lea Plchová	2–6, 3–6
Win	12.	14 June 1981	Nantes, France	Clay	(United States) Barbara Jordan	(Italy) Daniela Porzio (France) Frédérique Thibault	5–7, 6–3, 6–3
Loss	13.	5 July 1981	Arachon, France	Clay	(Spain) Carmen Perea	(France) Catherine Tanvier (Peru) Laura Arraya	3–6, 5–7
Win	14.	12 July 1981	Marseille, France	Clay	(Poland) Iwona Kuczyńska	(France) Isabelle Vernhes (Italy) Daniela Porzio	6–7, 6–2, 6–1
Win	15.	23 August 1981	Overpelt, Belgium	Clay	(Belgium) Monique Van Haver	(United Kingdom) Anthea Cooper (United Kingdom) Cathy Drury	3–6, 6–3, 6–4
Win	16.	30 August 1981	St. Niklaus, Switzerland	Clay	(Belgium) Monique Van Haver	(Canada) Kate Glancy (Australia) Karen Gulley	6–2, 7–6
Loss	17.	14 September 1981	Liège, Belgium	Clay	(Belgium) Monique Van Haver	(Belgium) Marion De Witte (United Kingdom) Cathy Drury	6–7, 1–6
Win	18.	28 November 1983	Telford, United Kingdom	Carpet	(Netherlands) Judith Warringa	(United Kingdom) Suzi Mair (Belgium) Kathleen Schuurmans	7–5, 7–6

== Grand Slam singles tournament timeline ==
Key
W	F	SF	QF	#R	RR	Q#	DNQ	A	NH

(W) winner; (F) finalist; (SF) semifinalist; (QF) quarterfinalist; (#R) rounds 4, 3, 2, 1; (RR) round-robin stage; (Q#) qualification round; (DNQ) did not qualify; (A) absent; (NH) not held; (SR) strike rate (events won / competed); (W–L) win–loss record.

Tournament	1975	1976	1977		1978	1979	1980	1981	Career SR
Australian Open	A	A	A	A	A	A	A	A	0 / 0
French Open	1R	SF	F		1R	A	A	A	0 / 4
Wimbledon	A	1R	2R		1R	A	1R	A	0 / 4
US Open	A	1R	3R		A	2R	A	A	0 / 3
SR	0 / 1	0 / 3	0 / 3		0 / 2	0 / 1	0 / 1	0 / 0	0 / 11
Year-end ranking	118	47	33		101	74	134	131	

Note: The Australian Open was held twice in 1977, in January and December.

== See also ==
- Performance timelines for all female tennis players since 1978 who reached at least one Grand Slam final
