= 1977 U.S. Clay Court Championships =

- Date: August 8–14
- Edition: 9th
- Category: Grand Prix circuit (Four star); WTA Tour
- Draw: 64S/32D (M); 32S/16D (W)
- Prize money: $125,000 (M) $35,000 (W)
- Surface: Clay / outdoor
- Location: Indianapolis, Indiana; United States

Champions

Men's singles
- (Spain) Manuel Orantes

Women's singles
- (United States) Laura duPont

Men's doubles
- (Chile) Patricio Cornejo / (Chile) Jaime Fillol

Women's doubles
- (South Africa) Linky Boshoff / (South Africa) Ilana Kloss
- U.S. Clay Court Championships

The 1977 U.S. Clay Court Championships was a tennis tournament that was part of the men's Grand Prix and women's Colgate Series circuits. It was held in Indianapolis in the United States and played on outdoor clay courts at the Indianapolis Racquet Club. It was the ninth edition of the tournament in the Open Era and was held from August 8 through August 14, 1977. Second-seeded Manuel Orantes won the men's singles title and the accompanying $17,500 first-prize money.

== Finals ==
=== Men's singles ===
(Spain) Manuel Orantes defeated (United States) Jimmy Connors 6–1, 6–3

=== Women's singles ===
(United States) Laura duPont defeated (United States) Nancy Richey 6–4, 6–3

=== Men's doubles ===
(Chile) Patricio Cornejo / (Chile) Jaime Fillol defeated (Australia) Dick Crealy / (Australia) Cliff Letcher 6–7, 6–4, 6–3

=== Women's doubles ===
(South Africa) Linky Boshoff / (South Africa) Ilana Kloss defeated (United States) Mary Carillo / (United States) Wendy Overton 5–7, 7–5, 6–3
