= 1977 French Open – Men's singles =

Men's singles
- 1977 French Open

Final
- Champion: (Argentina) Guillermo Vilas
- Runner-up: (United States) Brian Gottfried
- Score: 6–0, 6–3, 6–0
- Date: 6 June 1977

Details
- Draw: 128
- Seeds: 16 (12 Q )

Events
| Singles | men | women | | boys | girls |
| Doubles | men | women | mixed | boys | girls |
| WC Singles | men | women | quad |
| WC Doubles | men | women | quad |
| Legends | −45 | 45+ | women |
- French Open

Guillermo Vilas defeated Brian Gottfried in the final, 6–0, 6–3, 6–0 to win the men's singles tennis title at the 1977 French Open. It was his first major singles title, becoming the first Argentine to win a singles major.

Adriano Panatta was the defending champion, but lost in the quarterfinals to Raúl Ramírez. Two-time champion, Björn Borg, skipped the tournament to play World TeamTennis.

This tournament marked the first major appearance of future seven-time major champion and world No. 1, John McEnroe. He lost in the second round to Phil Dent.

== Seeds ==
The seeded players are listed below. Guillermo Vilas is the champion; others show the round in which they were eliminated.

1. (Romania) Ilie Năstase (quarterfinals)
2. (Italy) Adriano Panatta (quarterfinals)
3. (Argentina) Guillermo Vilas (champion)
4. (United States) Eddie Dibbs (second round)
5. (United States) Brian Gottfried (finalist)
6. (Mexico) Raúl Ramírez (semifinals)
7. (United States) Harold Solomon (fourth round)
8. (Georgia (country)) Alex Metreveli (withdrew)
9. (Poland) Wojciech Fibak (quarterfinals)
10. (United States) Stan Smith (fourth round)
11. (Italy) Corrado Barazzutti (first round)
12. (United States) Robert Lutz (first round)
13. (Czechoslovakia) Jan Kodeš (fourth round)
14. (Chile) Jaime Fillol Sr. (first round)
15. (Hungary) Balázs Taróczy (third round)
16. (France) François Jauffret (second round)

== Draw ==
Key

- Q = Qualifier
- WC = Wild card
- LL = Lucky loser
- Alt = Alternate
- ITF = ITF entry
- PR = Protected ranking
- SR = Special ranking
- SE = Special exempt
- JE = Junior exempt
- JR = Junior Accelerator Programme entrant
- CO = College Accelerator Programme entrant
- NG = Next Gen Accelerator Program entrant
- w/o = Walkover
- r = Retired
- d = Defaulted

=== Finals ===
Quarterfinals
1 | (Romania) Ilie Năstase | 6 | 6 | 2 | 2 | 3
5 | (United States) Brian Gottfried | 4 | 3 | 6 | 6 | 6
(Australia) Phil Dent | 6 | 6 | 3 | 6 | 6
(Spain) José Higueras | 1 | 3 | 6 | 7 | 3
9 | (Poland) Wojciech Fibak | 4 | 0 | 4
3 | (Argentina) Guillermo Vilas | 6 | 6 | 6
6 | (Mexico) Raúl Ramírez | 7 | 6 | 7
2 | (Italy) Adriano Panatta | 6 | 3 | 5

Semifinals
5 | (United States) Brian Gottfried | 7 | 6 | 7
(Australia) Phil Dent | 6 | 3 | 5
3 | (Argentina) Guillermo Vilas | 6 | 6 | 6
6 | (Mexico) Raúl Ramírez | 2 | 0 | 3

Final
5 | (United States) Brian Gottfried | 0 | 3 | 0
3 | (Argentina) Guillermo Vilas | 6 | 6 | 6

=== Bottom half ===
==== Section 1 ====
First round
1 | (Romania) I Năstase | 7 | 6 | 6
(Argentina) L Álvarez | 6 | 3 | 2
(South Africa) R Moore | 4 | 1 | 7 | 7 | 1
(United States) T Gullikson | 6 | 6 | 6 | 5 | 6
(Spain) J I Muntañola | 2 | 2 | 1
(Venezuela) J Andrew | 6 | 6 | 6
(United States) J Delaney | 1 | 2 | 2
(West Germany) K Meiler | 6 | 6 | 6
(India) S Menon | 4 | 6 | 1
(United States) P Fleming | 6 | 7 | 6
(Chile) J Pinto-Bravo | 4 | 6 | 6 | 2
(United States) G Mayer | 6 | 4 | 4 | 0 | r
(New Zealand) R Simpson | 2 | 2 | 2
(Sweden) J Norbäck | 6 | 6 | 6
(Japan) J Kuki | 1 | 3 | 1
13 | (Czechoslovakia) J Kodeš | 6 | 6 | 6

Second round
1 | (Romania) I Năstase | 6 | 3 | 4 | 6 | 6
(United States) T Gullikson | 3 | 6 | 6 | 2 | 1
(Venezuela) J Andrew | 6 | 3 | 4 | 2
(West Germany) K Meiler | 4 | 6 | 6 | 6
(United States) P Fleming | 7 | 3 | 0 | 2
(Chile) J Pinto-Bravo | 6 | 6 | 6 | 6
(Sweden) J Norbäck | 3 | 2 | 3
13 | (Czechoslovakia) J Kodeš | 6 | 6 | 6

Third round
1 | (Romania) I Năstase | 7 | 3 | 6 | 6 | 6
(West Germany) K Meiler | 6 | 6 | 1 | 7 | 1
(Chile) J Pinto-Bravo | 3 | 3 | 3
13 | (Czechoslovakia) J Kodeš | 6 | 6 | 6

Fourth round
1 | (Romania) I Năstase | 6 | 7 | 6
13 | (Czechoslovakia) J Kodeš | 4 | 5 | 3

==== Section 2 ====
First round
14 | (Chile) J Fillol Sr. | 4 | 3 | 6 | 3
(Czechoslovakia) V Zednik | 6 | 6 | 4 | 6
(United States) V Amaya | 5 | 2 | 4
(France) P Dominguez | 7 | 6 | 6
(United States) T Gullikson | 7 | 6 | 0 | 6
Q | (United Kingdom) R Drysdale | 6 | 3 | 6 | 3
(Paraguay) V Pecci Sr. | 6 | 7 | 3 | 4 | 3
(Brazil) T Koch | 3 | 5 | 6 | 6 | 6
(Australia) B Carmichael | 6 | 6 | 2 | 5
(France) C Casa | 1 | 7 | 6 | 7
(France) E Deblicker | 7 | 6 | 6
(United States) H Bunis | 5 | 1 | 2
Q | (Italy) G Ocleppo | 3 | 7 | 6 | 2
(United States) T Waltke | 6 | 5 | 7 | 6
(Colombia) I Molina | 3 | 2 | 1
5 | (United States) B Gottfried | 6 | 6 | 6

Second round
(Czechoslovakia) V Zednik | 6 | 5 | 6 | 6 | 5
(France) P Dominguez | 7 | 7 | 3 | 3 | 7
(United States) T Gullikson | 6 | 6 | 6 | 6
(Brazil) T Koch | 1 | 3 | 7 | 3
(France) C Casa | 6 | 3 | 5 | 5
(France) E Deblicker | 4 | 6 | 7 | 7
(United States) T Waltke | 3 | 5 | 4
5 | (United States) B Gottfried | 6 | 7 | 6

Third round
(France) P Dominguez | 6 | 6 | 6
(United States) T Gullikson | 3 | 1 | 1
(France) E Deblicker | 5 | 4 | 4
5 | (United States) B Gottfried | 7 | 6 | 6

Fourth round
(France) P Dominguez | 4 | 1 | 5
5 | (United States) B Gottfried | 6 | 6 | 7

==== Section 3 ====
First round
4 | (United States) E Dibbs | 6 | 6 | 6
(United Kingdom) M Robinson | 1 | 0 | 0
(Sweden) R Norberg | 6 | 6 | 6 | 6 | 7
Q | (Czechoslovakia) P Složil | 2 | 3 | 7 | 7 | 5
(Mexico) E Montaño | 6 | 6 | 6
(West Germany) W Zirngibl | 1 | 1 | 3
(France) Y Noah | 1 | 3 | 7 | 7 | 2
(New Zealand) B Fairlie | 6 | 6 | 6 | 6 | 6
Q | (United States) J McEnroe | 6 | 6 | 6
(Australia) A Gardiner | 3 | 4 | 0
(Socialist Federal Republic of Yugoslavia) N Pilić | 6 | 6 | 6 | 4 | 4
(Australia) P Dent | 1 | 4 | 7 | 6 | 6
(Australia) B Phillips-Moore | 6 | 6 | 6
(Chile) P Cornejo | 4 | 4 | 0
(Socialist Federal Republic of Yugoslavia) N Špear | 2 | 4 | 4
15 | (Hungary) B Taróczy | 6 | 6 | 6

Second round
4 | (United States) E Dibbs | 3 | 6 | 5 | 4
(Sweden) R Norberg | 6 | 3 | 7 | 6
(Mexico) E Montaño | 3 | 3 | 6 | 0
(New Zealand) B Fairlie | 6 | 6 | 4 | 6
Q | (United States) J McEnroe | 6 | 2 | 6 | 3 | 3
(Australia) P Dent | 4 | 6 | 4 | 6 | 6
(Australia) B Phillips-Moore | 6 | 5 | 5 | 3
15 | (Hungary) B Taróczy | 3 | 7 | 7 | 6

Third round
(Sweden) R Norberg | 4 | 1 | 0
(New Zealand) B Fairlie | 6 | 6 | 6
(Australia) P Dent | 3 | 7 | 6 | 6
15 | (Hungary) B Taróczy | 6 | 6 | 2 | 4

Fourth round
(New Zealand) B Fairlie | 0 | 2 | 4
(Australia) P Dent | 6 | 6 | 6

==== Section 4 ====
First round
11 | (Italy) C Barazzutti | 4 | 3 | 3
(Chile) H Gildemeister | 6 | 6 | 6
Q | (Australia) T Rocavert | 1 | 6 | 1 | 4
(France) J-F Caujolle | 6 | 4 | 6 | 6
(France) C Roger-Vasselin | 4 | 6 | 6 | 7 | 6
(United States) D R. Bohrnstedt | 6 | 2 | 7 | 5 | 1
(Australia) C Dibley | 6 | 6 | 6 | 0 | 6
(Spain) J Higueras | 3 | 2 | 7 | 6 | 8
Q | (West Germany) P Elter | 7 | 6 | 6
(United Kingdom) J Lloyd | 6 | 4 | 4
(United States) B Scanlon | 6 | 1 | 6 | 6
(Australia) C Kachel | 3 | 6 | 4 | 1
(United States) N Saviano | 6 | 6 | 6 | 2
(Rhodesia) A Pattison | 7 | 7 | 3 | 6
(United Kingdom) J Feaver | 3 | 4 | 6 | 2
7 | (United States) H Solomon | 6 | 6 | 3 | 6

Second round
(Chile) H Gildemeister | 6 | 6 | 7
(France) J-F Caujolle | 3 | 3 | 5
(France) C Roger-Vasselin | 7 | 2 | 3 | 1
(Spain) J Higueras | 5 | 6 | 6 | 6
Q | (West Germany) P Elter | 4 | 7 | 6 | 6
(United States) B Scanlon | 6 | 6 | 4 | 4
(Rhodesia) A Pattison | 2 | 4 | 2
7 | (United States) H Solomon | 6 | 6 | 6

Third round
(Chile) H Gildemeister | 3 | 7 | 6 | 4
(Spain) J Higueras | 6 | 5 | 7 | 6
Q | (West Germany) P Elter | 4 | 4 | 1
7 | (United States) H Solomon | 6 | 6 | 6

Fourth round
(Spain) J Higueras | 6 | 7 | 2 | 6
7 | (United States) H Solomon | 4 | 5 | 6 | 3

=== Bottom half ===
==== Section 5 ====
First round
8 | (Spain) A Muñoz | 3 | 6 | 4 | 6 | 6
(Czechoslovakia) T Šmid | 6 | 1 | 6 | 1 | 1
(France) J-L Haillet | 0 | 7 | 6 | 7 | 1
(West Germany) R Gehring | 6 | 6 | 7 | 5 | 6
Q | (Czechoslovakia) J Šimbera | 4 | 6 | 7 | 1 | 0
Q | (Czechoslovakia) P Hutka | 6 | 4 | 5 | 6 | 6
(United States) B Teacher | 7 | 6 | 4 | 6
(Colombia) A Betancur | 6 | 4 | 6 | 0
(New Zealand) C Lewis | 6 | 6 | 6
Q | (Ecuador) R Ycaza | 2 | 2 | 2
(Egypt) I El Shafei | 6 | 6 | 6
(United States) J C Hagey | 4 | 2 | 2
(Australia) M Edmondson | 6 | 6 | 6
(United States) S Krulevitz | 4 | 2 | 3
(United States) S Stewart | 3 | 2 | 5
9 | (Poland) W Fibak | 6 | 6 | 7

Second round
8 | (Spain) A Muñoz | 3 | 3 | 1
(West Germany) R Gehring | 6 | 6 | 6
Q | (Czechoslovakia) P Hutka | 7 | 6 | 6 | 6
(United States) B Teacher | 6 | 4 | 7 | 4
(New Zealand) C Lewis | 6 | 3 | 6 | 6
(Egypt) I El Shafei | 3 | 6 | 1 | 1
(Australia) M Edmondson | 2 | 4 | 4
9 | (Poland) W Fibak | 6 | 6 | 6

Third round
(West Germany) R Gehring | 7 | 6 | 6
Q | (Czechoslovakia) P Hutka | 6 | 3 | 1
(New Zealand) C Lewis | 2 | 3 | 6 | 3
9 | (Poland) W Fibak | 6 | 6 | 3 | 6

Fourth round
(West Germany) R Gehring | 7 | 4 | 2 | 6 | 4
9 | (Poland) W Fibak | 6 | 6 | 6 | 3 | 6

==== Section 6 ====
First round
10 | (United States) S Smith | 7 | 6 | 6
(Australia) D Crealy | 6 | 4 | 2
(United States) F McNair | 4 | 6 | 6 | 6 | 4
(West Germany) J Fassbender | 6 | 7 | 3 | 1 | 6
Q | (France) D Bedel | 6 | 6 | 6
(United States) M Machette | 2 | 1 | 2
(Czechoslovakia) J Hřebec | 2 | 6 | 6 | 6
(New Zealand) O Parun | 6 | 2 | 3 | 4
(South Africa) B Mitton | 6 | 6 | 6
(United States) P Du Pré | 0 | 1 | 2
(France) H Gauvain | 4 | 3 | 7 | 4
(Switzerland) C Dowdeswell | 6 | 6 | 6 | 6
(Bolivia) R Benavides | 0 | 2 | 6
(Chile) B Prajoux | 6 | 6 | 7
(Socialist Federal Republic of Yugoslavia) Z Franulović | 1 | 2 | 4
3 | (Argentina) G Vilas | 6 | 6 | 6

Second round
10 | (United States) S Smith | 6 | 6 | 7
(West Germany) J Fassbender | 4 | 3 | 5
Q | (France) D Bedel | 3 | 2 | 4
(Czechoslovakia) J Hřebec | 6 | 6 | 6
(South Africa) B Mitton | 6 | 5 | 7 | 7 | 6
(Switzerland) C Dowdeswell | 7 | 7 | 6 | 5 | 3
(Chile) B Prajoux | 6 | 0 | 3 | 0
3 | (Argentina) G Vilas | 2 | 6 | 6 | 6

Third round
10 | (United States) S Smith | 6 | 6 | 5 | 7
(Czechoslovakia) J Hřebec | 4 | 2 | 7 | 6
(South Africa) B Mitton | 1 | 4 | 2
3 | (Argentina) G Vilas | 6 | 6 | 6

Fourth round
10 | (United States) S Smith | 1 | 2 | 1
3 | (Argentina) G Vilas | 6 | 6 | 6

==== Section 7 ====
First round
6 | (Mexico) R Ramírez | 6 | 6 | 7
(France) G Goven | 4 | 1 | 5
(United States) J Borowiak | 6 | 5
(South Africa) B Hewitt | 4 | 1 | r
(West Germany) U Pinner | 6 | 6 | 6
(South Africa) D Schneider | 0 | 4 | 2
(South Africa) B Bertram | 6 | 6 | 6
(United States) J Whitlinger | 2 | 1 | 2
(Colombia) J Velasco Sr. | 3 | 2 | 6 | 4
(Czechoslovakia) F Pála | 6 | 6 | 3 | 6
(Italy) T Zugarelli | 6 | 6 | 6
(South Africa) W Prinsloo | 1 | 1 | 4
(South Africa) J Yuill | 6 | 6 | 6
Q | (Spain) J Moreno | 4 | 1 | 2
(West Germany) F Gebert | 6 | 6 | 2 | 6 | 2
16 | (France) F Jauffret | 2 | 0 | 6 | 7 | 6

Second round
6 | (Mexico) R Ramírez | 6 | 6 | 6
(United States) J Borowiak | 3 | 3 | 2
(West Germany) U Pinner | 6 | 7 | 6
(South Africa) B Bertram | 2 | 5 | 1
(Czechoslovakia) F Pála | 4 | 6 | 3 | 4
(Italy) T Zugarelli | 6 | 2 | 6 | 6
(South Africa) J Yuill | 6 | 7 | 2 | 6 | 6
16 | (France) F Jauffret | 4 | 6 | 6 | 7 | 4

Third round
6 | (Mexico) R Ramírez | 7 | 6 | 5 | 6
(West Germany) U Pinner | 6 | 1 | 7 | 1
(Italy) T Zugarelli | w/o
(South Africa) J Yuill

Fourth round
6 | (Mexico) R Ramírez | 6 | 6 | 6
(South Africa) J Yuill | 2 | 4 | 3

==== Section 8 ====
First round
12 | (United States) R Lutz | 1 | 3 | 6
(France) P Proisy | 6 | 6 | 7
(United Kingdom) B Mottram | 6 | 6 | 6
(Spain) J Soler | 3 | 4 | 3
(Italy) P Bertolucci | 6 | 6 | 6
(Argentina) R Cano | 1 | 0 | 3
(Austria) H Kary | 3 | 7 | 6 | 6
(United Kingdom) R Lewis | 6 | 6 | 2 | 2
(France) C Freyss | 5 | 3 | 6 | 6 | 1
(Australia) K Warwick | 7 | 6 | 1 | 2 | 6
(Sweden) K Johansson | 3 | 4 | 6 | 6 | 2
(Australia) P McNamee | 6 | 6 | 1 | 2 | 6
(Argentina) J Ganzábal | 6 | 7 | 2 | 3 | 6
(United States) B Martin | 4 | 6 | 6 | 6 | 3
Q | (France) P Beust | 5 | 4 | 7 | 2
2 | (Italy) A Panatta | 7 | 6 | 5 | 6

Second round
(France) P Proisy | 3 | 3 | 6 | 3
(United Kingdom) B Mottram | 6 | 6 | 1 | 6
(Italy) P Bertolucci | 6 | 6 | 6
(Austria) H Kary | 3 | 0 | 2
(Australia) K Warwick | 3 | 6 | 4
(Australia) P McNamee | 6 | 7 | 6
(Argentina) J Ganzábal | 2 | 6 | 4 | 1
2 | (Italy) A Panatta | 6 | 2 | 6 | 6

Third round
(United Kingdom) B Mottram | 0 | 6 | 7 | 7
(Italy) P Bertolucci | 6 | 3 | 6 | 5
(Australia) P McNamee | 4 | 2 | 2
2 | (Italy) A Panatta | 6 | 6 | 6

Fourth round
(United Kingdom) B Mottram | 6 | 6 | 3 | 4 | 4
2 | (Italy) A Panatta | 2 | 4 | 6 | 6 | 6

| Preceded by 1977 Australian Open (January) | Grand Slam men's singles | Succeeded by 1977 Wimbledon Championships |
