= 1977 French Open =

- Date: 23 May – 5 June 1977
- Edition: 76
- Category: 47th Grand Slam (ITF)
- Prize money: $300,000
- Surface: Clay / outdoor
- Location: Paris (XVI^{e}), France
- Venue: Stade Roland Garros

Champions

Men's singles
- (Argentina) Guillermo Vilas

Women's singles
- (Socialist Federal Republic of Yugoslavia) Mima Jaušovec

Men's doubles
- (United States) Brian Gottfried / (Mexico) Raúl Ramírez

Women's doubles
- (Czechoslovakia) Regina Maršíková / (United States) Pam Teeguarden

Mixed doubles
- (United States) Mary Carillo / (United States) John McEnroe
← 1976 ·	French Open	· 1978 →

The 1977 French Open was a tennis tournament that took place on the outdoor clay courts at the Stade Roland Garros in Paris, France. The tournament ran from 23 May until 5 June. It was the 76th staging of the French Open, and the second Grand Slam tennis event of 1977.

== Finals ==
=== Men's singles ===
(Argentina) Guillermo Vilas defeated (United States) Brian Gottfried, 6–0, 6–3, 6–0

- It was Vilas's 1st career Grand Slam title.

=== Women's singles ===
(Socialist Federal Republic of Yugoslavia) Mima Jaušovec (Note: Jaušovec became the first player (male or female) from Yugoslavia to win the French Open singles crown.) defeated (Romania) Florența Mihai, 6–2, 6–7^{(5–7)}, 6–1

- It was Jaušovec's only career Grand Slam title.

=== Men's doubles ===
(United States) Brian Gottfried / (Mexico) Raúl Ramírez defeated (Poland) Wojciech Fibak / (Czechoslovakia) Jan Kodeš, 7–6, 4–6, 6–3, 6–4

=== Women's doubles ===
(Czechoslovakia) Regina Maršíková / (United States) Pam Teeguarden defeated (United States) Rayni Fox / (Australia) Helen Gourlay, 5–7, 6–4, 6–2

=== Mixed doubles ===
(United States) Mary Carillo / (United States) John McEnroe defeated (Romania) Florența Mihai / (Colombia) Iván Molina, 7–6, 6–4

== Prize money ==
Event		W	F	SF	QF	4R	3R	2R	1R
Singles	Men	FF190,000	FF96,000	FF48,000	FF24,000	FF14,000	FF8,000	FF4,400	FF2,600
Singles	Women	FF35,000	FF20,000	FF10,000	FF4,000	-	FF2,000	FF1,000	FF650

== Notes ==
Preceded by 1977 Australian Open	Grand Slams	Succeeded by 1977 Wimbledon Championships
