= 1977 U.S. Clay Court Championships – Men's doubles =

Men's doubles
- 1977 U.S. Clay Court Championships

Final
- Champions: (Chile) Patricio Cornejo (Chile) Jaime Fillol
- Runners-up: (Australia) Dick Crealy (Australia) Cliff Letcher
- Score: 6–7, 6–4, 6–3

Events
Singles	men	women
Doubles	men	women
← 1976 ·	U.S. Clay Court Championships	· 1978 →

Brian Gottfried and Raúl Ramírez were the defending champions, but they played in the Buckeye Classic this year. Patricio Cornejo and Jaime Fillol claimed the title following victory over Dick Crealy and Cliff Letcher in the final. Crealy and Letcher were denied their prize money because their late appearance had caused the final to be delayed.

== Seeds ==
A champion seed is indicated in bold text while text in italics indicates the round in which that seed was eliminated.

1. (Poland) Wojciech Fibak / (United States) Dick Stockton (semifinals)
2. (Australia) Mark Edmondson / (Australia) John Marks (second round)
3. (Spain) Antonio Muñoz / (Spain) Manuel Orantes (first round)
4. (Australia) Phil Dent / (Rhodesia) Andrew Pattison (second round)
5. (Chile) **Patricio Cornejo / (Chile) Jaime Fillol (champions)**
6. (Socialist Federal Republic of Yugoslavia) Željko Franulović / (Hungary) Balázs Taróczy (quarterfinals)
7. (United States) Mike Cahill / (United States) Terry Moor (second round)
8. (India) Anand Amritraj / (France) Jean-Louis Haillet (first round)

== Draw ==
=== Key ===
- Q = Qualifier
- WC = Wild card
- LL = Lucky loser
- Alt = Alternate
- ITF = ITF entry
- PR = Protected ranking
- SR = Special ranking
- SE = Special exempt
- JE = Junior exempt
- JR = Junior Accelerator Programme entrant
- CO = College Accelerator Programme entrant
- NG = Next Gen Accelerator Program entrant
- w/o = Walkover
- r = Retired
- d = Defaulted

=== Finals ===
Semifinals
1	(Poland) Wojciech Fibak (United States) Dick Stockton	3	6
5	**(Chile) Patricio Cornejo** **(Chile) Jaime Fillol**	**6**	**7**
(United States) Victor Amaya (United States) Trey Waltke	4	**6**	8
**(Australia) Dick Crealy** **(Australia) Cliff Letcher**	**6**	4	**10**

Final
5	**(Chile) Patricio Cornejo** **(Chile) Jaime Fillol**	6	**6**	**6**
(Australia) Dick Crealy (Australia) Cliff Letcher	**7**	4	3

=== Top half ===
First round
1	**(Poland) W Fibak** **(United States) D Stockton**	w/o
(Colombia) Jorge Esguerra (Colombia) C Gómez
(United States) W Blocher (United States) C Sylvan	6	1
**(United States) E Teltscher** **(United States) T Wilkison**	**7**	**6**
**(United States) H Bunis** **(Australia) P McNamee**	**6**	5	**7**
(South Africa) D Schneider (West Germany) W Zirngibl	2	**7**	5
**(United States) B Scanlon** **(United States) B Teacher**	**6**	**6**
8	(India) A Amritraj (France) J-L Haillet	3	3
4	**(Australia) P Dent** **(Rhodesia) A Pattison**	w/o
(United States) W Lofgren (United States) B Seewagen
**(United States) J McEnroe** **(United States) M Mitchell**	**6**	**6**
(United States) C DeVoe (United States) Mike Smart	0	2
**(France) P Dominguez** **(Australia) J James**	**6**	**6**
(Australia) B Drewett (Australia) C Fancutt	1	0
(United States) H Schoenfield (United States) Nick White	1	3
5	**(Chile) P Cornejo** **(Chile) J Fillol**	**6**	**6**

Second round
1	**(Poland) W Fibak** **(United States) D Stockton**	**6**	**6**
(United States) E Teltscher (United States) T Wilkison	2	2
**(United States) H Bunis** **(Australia) P McNamee**	**6**	**7**
(United States) B Scanlon (United States) B Teacher	4	6
4	(Australia) P Dent (Rhodesia) A Pattison	2	4
**(United States) J McEnroe** **(United States) M Mitchell**	**6**	**6**
(France) P Dominguez (Australia) J James	1	3
5	**(Chile) P Cornejo** **(Chile) J Fillol**	**6**	**6**

Quarterfinals
1	**(Poland) W Fibak** **(United States) D Stockton**	**6**	**7**
(United States) H Bunis (Australia) P McNamee	1	5
(United States) J McEnroe (United States) M Mitchell	**6**	6	3
5	**(Chile) P Cornejo** **(Chile) J Fillol**	3	**7**	**6**

Semifinals
1	(Poland) W Fibak (United States) D Stockton	3	6
5	**(Chile) P Cornejo** **(Chile) J Fillol**	**6**	**7**

=== Bottom half ===
First round
6	**(Socialist Federal Republic of Yugoslavia) Ž Franulović** **(Hungary) B Taróczy**	w/o
(Colombia) Á Betancur (Mexico) E Montaño
**(United States) Nial Brash** **(United States) B Maze**	5	**6**	**6**
(New Zealand) C Lewis (United States) T Graham	**7**	4	3
(United States) Jeff Jones (United States) Doug Potkay	3	**6**	2
**(United States) V Amaya** **(United States) T Waltke**	**6**	4	**6**
**(United States) Z Guerry** **(United States) G Hardie**	**7**	**6**
3	(Spain) A Muñoz (Spain) M Orantes	6	4
7	**(United States) M Cahill** **(United States) T Moor**	3	**7**
(United Kingdom) B Mottram (New Zealand) O Parun	**6**	6	r
(United States) N Golden (United States) R Pascale
**(Austria) H Kary** **(United States) S Krulevitz**	w/o
(France) B Fritz (France) C Roger-Vasselin	3	5
**(Australia) D Crealy** **(Australia) C Letcher**	**6**	**7**
(United States) B Manson (United States) H Pfister	2	**7**	4
2	**(Australia) M Edmondson** **(Australia) J Marks**	**6**	6	**6**

Second round
6	**(Socialist Federal Republic of Yugoslavia) Ž Franulović** **(Hungary) B Taróczy**	w/o
(United States) N Brash (United States) B Maze
**(United States) V Amaya** **(United States) T Waltke**	**6**	**6**
(United States) Z Guerry (United States) G Hardie	3	0
7	(United States) M Cahill (United States) T Moor	3	2
**(Austria) H Kary** **(United States) S Krulevitz**	**6**	**6**
**(Australia) D Crealy** **(Australia) C Letcher**	**7**	**7**
2	(Australia) M Edmondson (Australia) J Marks	5	5

Quarterfinals
6	(Socialist Federal Republic of Yugoslavia) Ž Franulović (Hungary) B Taróczy	6	**6**	2
**(United States) V Amaya** **(United States) T Waltke**	**7**	2	**6**
(Austria) H Kary (United States) S Krulevitz	3	5
**(Australia) D Crealy** **(Australia) C Letcher**	**6**	**7**

Semifinals
(United States) V Amaya (United States) T Waltke	4	**6**	8
**(Australia) D Crealy** **(Australia) C Letcher**	**6**	4	**10**
