= 1977 U.S. Clay Court Championships – Men's singles =

Men's singles
- 1977 U.S. Clay Court Championships

Final
- Champion: (Spain) Manuel Orantes
- Runner-up: (United States) Jimmy Connors
- Score: 6–1, 6–3

Details
- Draw: 64
- Seeds: 16

Events
Singles	men	women
Doubles	men	women
- U.S. Clay Court Championships

Manuel Orantes won the title for the third time, defeating Jimmy Connors in the final.

== Seeds ==
A champion seed is indicated in bold text while text in italics indicates the round in which that seed was eliminated.

1. (United States) Jimmy Connors (final)
2. (Spain) **Manuel Orantes (champion)**
3. (United States) Harold Solomon (quarterfinals)
4. (Poland) Wojciech Fibak (second round)
5. (United States) Dick Stockton (quarterfinals)
6. (United States) Eddie Dibbs (third round)
7. (Chile) Jaime Fillol (third round)
8. (Australia) Phil Dent (semifinals)
9. (United Kingdom) Buster Mottram (third round)
10. (Socialist Federal Republic of Yugoslavia) Željko Franulović (third round)
11. (Hungary) Balázs Taróczy (semifinals)
12. (United States) ~~Cliff Richey~~ (withdrew)
13. (United States) Bill Scanlon (third round)
14. (United States) Hank Pfister (first round)
15. (Australia) Dick Crealy (second round)
16. (Australia) Mark Edmondson (first round)

== Draw ==
Key

- Q = Qualifier
- WC = Wild card
- LL = Lucky loser
- Alt = Alternate
- ITF = ITF entry
- PR = Protected ranking
- SR = Special ranking
- SE = Special exempt
- JE = Junior exempt
- JR = Junior Accelerator Programme entrant
- CO = College Accelerator Programme entrant
- NG = Next Gen Accelerator Program entrant
- w/o = Walkover
- r = Retired
- d = Defaulted

=== Finals ===
Quarterfinals
1	**(United States) Jimmy Connors**	2	**6**	**10**
5	(United States) Dick Stockton	**6**	4	8
(United States) John McEnroe	4	6
8	**(Australia) Phil Dent**	**6**	**7**
13	**(Hungary) Balázs Taróczy**	**6**	**6**
3	(United States) Harold Solomon	4	2
(United States) Terry Moor	1	2
2	**(Spain) Manuel Orantes**	**6**	**6**

Semifinals
1	**(United States) Jimmy Connors**	**6**	**6**
8	(Australia) Phil Dent	3	1
13	(Hungary) Balázs Taróczy	3	**7**	3
2	**(Spain) Manuel Orantes**	**6**	5	**6**

Final
1	(United States) Jimmy Connors	1	3
2	**(Spain) Manuel Orantes**	**6**	**6**

=== Top half ===
==== Section 1 ====
First round
1	**(United States) J Connors**	**6**	**6**
(United States) H Bunis	2	3
Q	(United States) B Nichols	4	1
**(United States) M Mitchell**	**6**	**6**
15	**(Australia) D Crealy**	**6**	**6**
(United States) G Hardie	1	4
**(United States) B Teacher**	**6**	6	**6**
Q	(Australia) B Drewett	4	**7**	3
5	**(United States) D Stockton**	**6**	**6**
(United States) C Lewis	1	2
(France) P Proisy	1	1
**(United States) Z Guerry**	**6**	**6**
9	**(United Kingdom) B Mottram**	**6**	**6**
Q	(France) B Fritz	4	3
**(Chile) P Cornejo**	**6**	6	**6**
(Venezuela) J Andrew	1	**7**	4

Second round
1	**(United States) J Connors**	**6**	**6**
(United States) M Mitchell	2	0
15	(Australia) D Crealy	**6**	4	0
**(United States) B Teacher**	4	**6**	**6**
5	**(United States) D Stockton**	**7**	4	**6**
(United States) Z Guerry	5	**6**	2
9	**(United Kingdom) B Mottram**	**6**	**6**
(Chile) P Cornejo	4	3

Third round
1	**(United States) J Connors**	**7**	**6**
(United States) B Teacher	6	4
5	**(United States) D Stockton**	**6**	4	**6**
9	(United Kingdom) B Mottram	4	**6**	3

Quarterfinals
1	**(United States) J Connors**	2	**6**	**10**
5	(United States) D Stockton	**6**	4	8

==== Section 2 ====
First round
4	**(Poland) W Fibak**	**6**	6	**6**
(France) P Dominguez	4	**7**	4
(United States) T Graham	2	2
**(United States) J McEnroe**	**6**	**6**
13	**(United States) B Scanlon**	**6**	**7**
(France) J-F Caujolle	1	5
**(Australia) P McNamee**	**6**	**6**
(Bolivia) R Benavides	3	4
8	**(Australia) P Dent**	**7**	**6**
(United States) B Maze	6	1
**(United States) B Seewagen**	6	**7**	**6**
(Australia) C Letcher	**7**	6	2
**(United States) H Schoenfield**	**6**	4	**6**
(Czechoslovakia) T Šmíd	3	**6**	3
(Mexico) E Montaño	3	3
**(Colombia) Á Betancur**	**6**	**6**

Second round
4	(Poland) W Fibak	**7**	1	2
**(United States) J McEnroe**	6	**6**	**6**
13	**(United States) B Scanlon**	4	**6**	**6**
(Australia) P McNamee	**6**	4	2
8	**(Australia) P Dent**	**6**	**6**
(United States) B Seewagen	3	4
(United States) H Schoenfield	4	3
**(Colombia) Á Betancur**	**6**	**6**

Third round
**(United States) J McEnroe**	**6**	**7**
13	(United States) B Scanlon	3	5
8	**(Australia) P Dent**	**6**	**6**
(Colombia) Á Betancur	3	2

Quarterfinals
(United States) J McEnroe	4	6
8	**(Australia) P Dent**	**6**	**7**

=== Bottom half ===
==== Section 3 ====
First round
(Australia) J Marks	3	3
**(Austria) H Kary**	**6**	**6**
Q	(Australia) C Fancutt	3	3
11	**(Hungary) B Taróczy**	**6**	**6**
(United States) E Teltscher	5	4
Q	**(United States) T Wilkison**	**7**	**6**
(France) J-L Haillet	**6**	3	2
7	**(Chile) J Fillol**	2	**6**	**6**
(United States) T Waltke	6	**6**	4
**(United States) M Cahill**	**7**	2	**6**
(India) A Amritraj	4	4
10	**(Socialist Federal Republic of Yugoslavia) Ž Franulović**	**6**	**6**
(United States) B Manson	3	4
**(Rhodesia) A Pattison**	**6**	**6**
(South Africa) D Schneider	3	**6**	3
3	**(United States) H Solomon**	**6**	3	**6**

Second round
(Austria) H Kary	5	2
11	**(Hungary) B Taróczy**	**7**	**6**
(United States) T Wilkison	**7**	4	2
7	**(Chile) J Fillol**	5	**6**	**6**
(United States) M Cahill	3	3
10	**(Socialist Federal Republic of Yugoslavia) Ž Franulović**	**6**	**6**
(Rhodesia) A Pattison	4	3
3	**(United States) H Solomon**	**6**	**6**

Third round
11	**(Hungary) B Taróczy**	**6**	**6**
7	(Chile) J Fillol	1	2
10	(Socialist Federal Republic of Yugoslavia) Ž Franulović	**7**	4	2
3	**(United States) H Solomon**	5	**6**	**6**

Quarterfinals
11	**(Hungary) B Taróczy**	**6**	**6**
3	(United States) H Solomon	4	2

==== Section 4 ====
First round
(United States) W Lofgren	**6**	4	5
**(United States) T Moor**	3	**6**	**7**
**(Australia) J James**	**6**	**6**
14	(United States) H Pfister	4	3
Q	(United States) C Sylvan	**7**	3	3
Q	**(France) C Roger-Vasselin**	5	**6**	**6**
(Spain) A Muñoz	0	3
6	**(United States) E Dibbs**	**6**	**6**
Q	(United States) W Blocher	5	4
**(United States) V Amaya**	**7**	**6**
**(New Zealand) O Parun**	0	**7**	**6**
16	(Australia) M Edmondson	**6**	5	3
**(United States) S Krulevitz**	**6**	**6**
(Japan) J Kuki	1	0
(West Germany) W Zirngibl	4	0
2	**(Spain) M Orantes**	**6**	**6**

Second round
**(United States) T Moor**	**6**	3	**6**
(Australia) J James	4	**6**	1
Q	(France) C Roger-Vasselin	1	2
6	**(United States) E Dibbs**	**6**	**6**
**(United States) V Amaya**	**6**	**7**
(New Zealand) O Parun	4	6
(United States) S Krulevitz	**6**	1	1
2	**(Spain) M Orantes**	3	**6**	**6**

Third round
**(United States) T Moor**	2	**6**	**7**
6	(United States) E Dibbs	**6**	2	5
(United States) V Amaya	4	3
2	**(Spain) M Orantes**	**6**	**6**

Quarterfinals
(United States) T Moor	1	2
2	**(Spain) M Orantes**	**6**	**6**
