= Rayni Fox =

American tennis player

- Full name: Rayni Fox-Borinsky
- Country (sports): United States
- Born: May 24, 1956 (age 69); Miami Beach, Florida, U.S.
- Height: 5 ft 4 in (1.63 m)
- Turned pro: August 1975
- Plays: Right-handed (two-handed backhand)

Singles
- Career record: no value
- Career titles: 1

Grand Slam singles results
- Australian Open: QF (1977)
- French Open: 1R (1977, 1979)
- Wimbledon: 3R (1977, 1979)
- US Open: 2R (1977, 1979)

Doubles
- Career record: no value
- Career titles: 2

Grand Slam doubles results
- Australian Open: 1R (1977)
- French Open: F (1977)
- Wimbledon: 3R (1979)
- US Open: QF (1974)

Grand Slam mixed doubles results
- Wimbledon: 2R (1979, 1980)
- US Open: QF (1974)

Rayni Fox (born May 24, 1956) is an American former tennis player who was active from the mid-1970s until the early 1980s.

As a junior player Fox was a singles runner-up to Mima Jaušovec at the 1973 Orange Bowl. In 1974 she won the U.S. Girls' 18s national singles title. Fox attended Rollins College for two years before turning pro in August 1975.

During her career Fox played in all four Grand Slam tournaments. Her best result was reaching the doubles final at the 1977 French Open with Helen Cawley in which they were defeated in three sets by Regina Maršíková and Pam Teeguarden. Her best result in singles occurred in 1977 when she reached the quarterfinals at the Australian Open in which she lost to second-seeded Sue Barker. At the Wimbledon Championships, she reached the third round in 1977 and 1979.

With a solid volleys and good speed, she was more successful in doubles than in singles. On the WTA Tour, she won two doubles titles with Helen Cawley in Switzerland and Austria, and she won three Avon Futures doubles titles with Bunny Bruning in North America. Fox became the singles champion at the Tasmanian Open in January 1977, defeating Lesley Bowrey in the final in three sets.

Fox played in the World Team Tennis competition in 1975 (Pittsburgh Triangles), 1976 (Cleveland Nets) and 1978 (Phoenix Racquets).

She was married to Arthur Borinsky who was a business man and marshal. In 2006 she was inducted into the MetroWest Jewish Sports Hall of Fame. Fox is currently a professional tennis coach in Chatham, New Jersey.

== Grand Slam finals ==
=== Doubles (1 runner-up) ===
Result	Year	Championship	Surface	Partner	Opponents	Score
Loss	1977	French Open	Clay	(Australia) Helen Cawley	(Czechoslovakia) Regina Maršíková (United States) Pam Teeguarden	7–5, 4–6, 2–6

== Career finals ==
=== Singles (1 title) ===
Result	W-L	Date	Tournament	Surface	Opponents	Score
Win	1–0	Jan 1977	Tasmanian Open, Australia	Hard	(Australia) Lesley Bowrey	6–2, 4–6, 7–6

=== Doubles (2 titles) ===
Result	W-L	Date	Tournament	Surface	Partner	Opponents	Score
Win	1–0	Jul 1977	Swiss Open, Switzerland	Hard	(Australia) Helen Cawley	(United States) Mary Carillo (Australia) Lesley Hunt	6–0, 6–4
Win	2–0	Jul 1977	Austrian Open, Austria	Hard (i)	(Australia) Helen Cawley	(United Kingdom) Lesley Charles (United Kingdom) Jackie Fayter	6–1, 6–4
