= Javier Soler (footballer) =

Spanish footballer

Personal information
- Full name: Javier Soler Gandia
- Date of birth: 20 February 1997 (age 29)
- Place of birth: Ontinyent, Spain
- Height: 1.86 m (6 ft 1 in)
- Position: Centre back

Team information
- Current team: Alcoyano

Youth career
- Ontinyent
- Alcoyano
- 2015–2016: Córdoba

College career
Years	Team	Apps	(Gls)
2023–2024	Bryant Bulldogs		

Senior career*
Years	Team	Apps	(Gls)
2016–2018	Córdoba B	62	(0)
2017	Córdoba	1	(0)
2018–2019	Levante B	20	(0)
2019–2020	Getafe B	16	(0)
2020–2023	Alzira	84	(4)
2024–2025	Águilas	20	(2)
2025–	Alcoyano	0	(0)
- * Club domestic league appearances and goals as of 4 May 2025

Javier Soler Gandia (born 20 February 1997) is a Spanish footballer who plays for Segunda Federación club Alcoyano. Mainly a central defender, he can also play as a midfielder.

== Club career ==
Soler was born in Ontinyent, Valencian Community, and represented Ontinyent CF, CD Alcoyano and Córdoba CF as a youth. He made his senior debut with the reserves on 12 May 2016, starting in a 1–3 Tercera División away loss against UD Los Barrios.

Soler made his first team debut on 2 December 2017, starting in a 1–3 loss at SD Huesca in the Segunda División. The following 10 July he moved to another reserve team, Atlético Levante UD in the third level.
