= Javier Soler (tennis) =

Spanish tennis player (born 1955)

- Full name: Javier Soler
- Country (sports): Spain
- Born: 25 March 1955 (age 70); Barcelona, Spain
- Plays: Left-handed

Singles
- Career record: 25-50
- Career titles: 0
- Highest ranking: No. 74 (16 October 1978)

Grand Slam singles results
- French Open: 1R (1977, 1978, 1979)
- US Open: 1R (1977)

Doubles
- Career record: 11-36
- Career titles: 0

Grand Slam doubles results
- French Open: 2R (1977)

Javier Soler (born 25 March 1955) is a former professional tennis player from Spain.

== Biography ==
A left-handed player from Barcelona, Soler featured in the Spain Davis Cup team for two ties, both in 1977. His first appearance was the doubles rubber when Spain played Greece in Athens. He and partner Antonio Muñoz secured the tie with a four-set win. He was called up again for Spain in the Europe Zone final against Italy in Barcelona. With the Italians having an unassailable 3–1 lead, Soler was picked for the fifth match against Adriano Panatta, a dead rubber. He managed to dominate the former French Open champion for a 6–1, 6–0 win, but the Italian was accused of not playing to his best. The crowd was reportedly incensed by Panatta's performance which was described as "lackadaisical" and showing "little inclination to fight". He allegedly deliberately hit some of his shots out during the match. The crowd booed Panatta throughout and a few attempted to attack him as he left the court. There were even fist fights in the crowd between Spanish and Italian supporters.

Soler played in the main singles draw of the French Open on three occasions and was unable to get past the opening round. In both 1977 and 1978, he lost in the first round to Buster Mottram, then in 1979 faced ninth seed Arthur Ashe. Soler, who also played in the 1977 US Open, competed on the Grand Prix and WCT circuits. His best performance was a semi-final appearance at Murcia in 1977, during which he defeated Roger Taylor. He also had career wins over Juan Aguilera and Corrado Barazzutti. In 1983 he was a doubles gold medalist at the Mediterranean Games in Casablanca.

== See also ==
- List of Spain Davis Cup team representatives
