= Iván Molina =

Colombian tennis player

- Country (sports): Colombia
- Born: 16 June 1946 (age 80) Maceo, Colombia
- Plays: Left-handed

Singles
- Career record: 142–184
- Career titles: 0
- Highest ranking: n°40 (5 April 1976)

Grand Slam singles results
- French Open: 2R (1978)
- Wimbledon: 2R (1972, 1973)
- US Open: 2R (1975, 1977)

Doubles
- Career record: 102–147
- Career titles: 2

Grand Slam doubles results
- French Open: 3R (1971, 1973, 1975)
- Wimbledon: 2R (1972, 1974)
- US Open: 2R (1972)

Mixed doubles
- Career record: 25–11
- Career titles: 1

Grand Slam mixed doubles results
- French Open: W (1974)
- Wimbledon: QF (1972)
- US Open: 3R (1972)

Iván Molina (born 16 June 1946) is a former professional Colombian tennis player.

Molina and Martina Navratilova teamed to win the 1974 French Open mixed doubles title, beating Rosie Reyes Darmon and Marcelo Lara 6–3, 6–3 in the final. Together with Florența Mihai, he reached the French Open mixed doubles final in 1977, losing to Mary Carillo and John McEnroe. The left-hander played 46 matches in the Davis Cup for Colombia from 1970 to 1979, winning 15 and losing 14 of his singles matches and winning 7 and losing 10 of his doubles matches. In 1974, he led Colombia to the Davis Cup Americas Inter-Zonal Final. He played 11 Tennis Grand Prix doubles finals (2 win) and 2 singles finals (no wins) and reached his highest singles ranking of 22 in April 1976 on the Grand Prix. He is considered to be the best Colombian tennis player of all time.

== Grand Slam finals ==
=== Mixed doubles: 2 (1–1) ===
Result	Year	Championship	Surface	Partner	Opponents	Score
Win	1974	French Open	Clay	(Czechoslovakia) Martina Navratilova	(Mexico) Marcelo Lara (Mexico) Rosie Reyes Darmon	6–3, 6–3
Loss	1977	French Open	Clay	(Romania) Florența Mihai	(United States) Mary Carillo (United States) John McEnroe	6–7, 3–6

== ATP career finals ==
=== Singles: 2 (2 runners-up) ===
Titles by surface
Hard (0–0)
Clay (0–2)
Grass (0–0)
Carpet (0–0)

Result	W-L	Date	Tournament	Surface	Opponent	Score
Loss	0–1	Apr 1975	Nice Int. Championships, France	Clay	(Australia) Dick Crealy	6–7, 4–6, 3–6
Loss	0–2	Oct 1975	Aryamehr Cup, Iran	Clay	(United States) Eddie Dibbs	6–1, 4–6, 5–7, 4–6

=== Doubles: 11 (2 titles-9 runner-up) ===
Finals by surface
Hard (0–3)
Clay (2–6)
Grass (0–0)
Carpet (0–0)

Result	W-L	Date	Tournament	Surface	Partner	Opponents	Score
Loss	0–1	Nov 1972	ATP Buenos Aires, Argentina	Clay	(Australia) Barry Phillips-Moore	(Chile) Jaime Fillol (Chile) Jaime Pinto Bravo	6–2, 6–7, 2–6
Win	1–1	Jul 1973	Dutch Open, Netherlands	Clay	(Australia) Allan Stone	(Spain) Andrés Gimeno (Spain) Antonio Muñoz	4–6, 7–6, 6–4
Loss	1–2	Nov 1973	ATP Buenos Aires, Argentina	Clay	(Chile) Patricio Cornejo	(Argentina) Ricardo Cano (Argentina) Guillermo Vilas	6–7, 3–6
Loss	1–3	Feb 1974	ATP Birmingham, US	Hard	(Greece) Nicholas Kalogeropoulos	(Australia) Ian Fletcher (United States) Sandy Mayer	6–4, 6–7, 1–6
Loss	1–4	Mar 1974	Calgary, Canada	Indoor	(Colombia) Jairo Velasco	(West Germany) Jürgen Fassbender (West Germany) Karl Meiler	4–6, 4–6
Loss	1–5	Mar 1974	Salt Lake City Open, US	Indoor	(Colombia) Jairo Velasco	(United States) Jimmy Connors (United States) Vitas Gerulaitis	6–2, 6–7, 5–7
Win	2–5	Jul 1974	Austrian Open Kitzbühel, Austria	Clay	(Colombia) Jairo Velasco	(Czechoslovakia) František Pála (Hungary) Balázs Taróczy	2–6, 7–6, 6–4, 6–4
Loss	2–6	Apr 1975	Nice Int. Championships, France	Clay	(Colombia) Jairo Velasco	(Mexico) Marcelo Lara (Mexico) Joaquín Loyo Mayo	6–7, 7–6, 6–8
Loss	2–7	Apr 1977	ATP Florence, Italy	Clay	(Colombia) Jairo Velasco	(New Zealand) Chris Lewis (New Zealand) Russell Simpson	6–2, 6–7, 2–6
Loss	2–8	Oct 1979	ATP Bordeaux, France	Clay	(France) Bernard Fritz	(France) Patrice Dominguez (France) Denis Naegelen	4–6, 4–6
Loss	2–9	Nov 1979	Quito Open, Ecuador	Clay	(Colombia) Jairo Velasco	(Chile) Jaime Fillol (Chile) Álvaro Fillol	7–6, 3–6, 1–6

== Performance timelines ==
Key
W	F	SF	QF	#R	RR	Q#	P#	DNQ	A	Z#	PO	G	S	B	NMS	NTI	P	NH

(W) winner; (F) finalist; (SF) semifinalist; (QF) quarterfinalist; (#R) rounds 4, 3, 2, 1; (RR) round-robin stage; (Q#) qualification round; (P#) preliminary round; (DNQ) did not qualify; (A) absent; (Z#) Davis/Fed Cup Zonal Group (with number indication) or (PO) play-off; (G) gold, (S) silver or (B) bronze Olympic/Paralympic medal; (NMS) not a Masters tournament; (NTI) not a Tier I tournament; (P) postponed; (NH) not held; (SR) strike rate (events won / competed); (W–L) win–loss record.

=== Singles ===
Tournament	1970	1971	1972	1973	1974	1975	1976	1977	1978	1979	1980	W–L
Grand Slam tournaments
Australian Open	A	A	A	A	A	A	A	A	A	A	A	0–0
French Open	A	1R	P1	1R	1R	1R	1R	1R	2R	1R	1R	1–9
Wimbledon	A	A	2R	2R	1R	1R	1R	A	A	A	A	2–5
US Open	A	A	1R	1R	1R	2R	1R	2R	A	1R	A	2–7
Win–loss	0–0	0–1	1–2	1–3	0–3	1–3	0–3	2–2	0–1	0–2	0–1	5–21
Year-end ranking	-	-	54	94	54	91	95	101	100	-	-	

=== Doubles ===
Tournament	1970	1971	1972	1973	1974	1975	1976	1977	1978	1979	1980	1981	1982	W–L
Grand Slam tournaments
Australian Open	A	A	A	A	A	A	A	A	A	A	A	A	A	0–0
French Open	A	3R	A	3R	2R	3R	2R	1R	1R	A	1R	A	2R	9–9
Wimbledon	A	A	2R	1R	2R	1R	1R	A	A	A	A	A	A	2–5
US Open	A	A	2R	A	A	A	A	A	A	A	A	A	A	1–1
Win–loss	0–0	2–1	2–2	2–2	2–2	2–2	1–2	0–1	0–1	0–0	0–1	0–0	1–1	12–15

=== Mixed doubles ===
Tournament	1970	1971	1972	1973	1974	1975	1976	1977	1978	1979	1980	W–L
Grand Slam tournaments
Australian Open	A	A	A	A	A	A	A	A	A	A	A	0–0
French Open	A	2R	A	A	W	QF	QF	F	2R	A	A	19–5
Wimbledon	A	1R	QF	2R	A	1R	1R	A	A	A	A	4–5
US Open	A	A	3R	A	A	A	A	A	A	A	A	2–1
Win–loss	0–0	1–2	5–2	1–1	6–0	3–2	3–2	5–1	1–1	0–0	0–0	25–11
