= Mary Hamm (tennis) =

American tennis player (born 1954)

- Full name: Mary Hamm-Ridings
- Country (sports): United States
- Born: September 7, 1954 (age 70); Mount Pulaski, Illinois

Singles

Grand Slam singles results
- French Open: 1R (1977)
- Wimbledon: 1R (1977)
- US Open: 3R (1976)

Doubles

Grand Slam doubles results
- French Open: QF (1977)
- Wimbledon: 3R (1977)
- US Open: 2R (1977)

Mary Hamm-Ridings (born September 7, 1954) is an American former professional tennis player.

Hamm, an Illinois native, played collegiate tennis for Trinity University in Texas, where she was a member of three championship teams and an All-American as a senior in 1976. She was a singles finalist at the 1976 Division I national championships.

Following her collegiate career she competed on the professional circuit and made the singles third round of the 1976 US Open, with wins over Marita Redondo and Gail Lovera. She was a women's doubles quarter-finalist at the 1977 French Open, partnering Candy Reynolds. At tour level she had a runner-up finish to Billie Jean King at the Lionel Cup in San Antonio in 1977.
