= Mima Jaušovec =

Yugoslavian tennis player

- ITF name: Mima Jausovec
- Country (sports): Yugoslavia
- Born: 20 July 1956 (age 69) Maribor, PR Slovenia, FPR Yugoslavia
- Height: 1.60 m (5 ft 3 in)
- Turned pro: 1975
- Retired: 1988
- Plays: Right-handed (one-handed backhand)
- Prize money: US$933,926

Singles
- Career record: 351–248
- Career titles: 5
- Highest ranking: No. 6 (22 March 1982)

Grand Slam singles results
- Australian Open: SF (1980)
- French Open: W (1977)
- Wimbledon: QF (1978, 1981)
- US Open: SF (1976)

Doubles
- Career record: 254–190
- Career titles: 11
- Highest ranking: No. 211 (21 December 1986)

Grand Slam doubles results
- Australian Open: 3R (1980)
- French Open: W (1978)
- Wimbledon: F (1978)
- US Open: SF (1976, 1983)
Medal record
Mediterranean Games
Gold medal – first place	1979 Split	Women's Singles
Gold medal – first place	1979 Split	Women's Doubles

Mima Jaušovec (Slovene pronunciation: [ˈmìːma jaˈùːʃɔʋɛts]; born 20 July 1956) is a Slovenian former professional tennis player. Competing for Yugoslavia, she won the 1977 French Open singles championship.

== Early life ==
Jaušovec was born in Maribor, in present-day Slovenia, when it was part of Yugoslavia.

== Career ==
As a girl, she was coached by Jelena Genčić. In singles, Jaušovec reached a career high of No. 6 in 1982. Her only Grand Slam triumph came in the 1977 French Open singles championship. In 1978, she again reached the final but was defeated by Virginia Ruzici. In 1983, she reached her third French Open singles final, losing to Chris Evert. Jaušovec's other tournament wins include the 1976 Italian Open and the 1978 German Open.

Jaušovec teamed with Ruzici to win the women's doubles title at the 1978 French Open. They defeated Lesley Turner Bowrey and Gail Sherriff Lovera in the final. In the same year, Jaušovec and Ruzici were the runners-up at Wimbledon, losing to Kerry Melville Reid and Wendy Turnbull.

Jaušovec's other victories at Grand Slam tournaments include wins over Martina Navratilova at the 1974 Wimbledon Championships, Virginia Wade at 1976 US Open, Wendy Turnbull at 1978 Wimbledon Championships, Evonne Goolagong at 1980 Australian Open, Andrea Jaeger at 1981 Wimbledon Championships, and Sylvia Hanika at 1983 French Open.

Jaušovec retired from playing in 1988. Today, she is the head coach of the Slovenian national female tennis team. She was an unsuccessful candidate of the Liberal Democracy of Slovenia for the 2004 European Parliament election.

== Grand Slam finals ==
=== Singles (1 title, 2 runners-up) ===
Result	Year	Championship	Surface	Opponent	Score
Win	1977	French Open	Clay	(Romania) Florența Mihai	6–2, 6–7^{(5–7)}, 6–1
Loss	1978	French Open	Clay	(Romania) Virginia Ruzici	2–6, 2–6
Loss	1983	French Open	Clay	(United States) Chris Evert	1–6, 2–6

=== Doubles (1 title, 1 runner–up) ===
Result	Year	Championship	Surface	Partner	Opponents	Score
Win	1978	French Open	Clay	(Romania) Virginia Ruzici	(France) Gail Sherriff Lovera (Australia) Lesley Turner Bowrey	5–7, 6–4, 8–6
Loss	1978	Wimbledon	Grass	(Romania) Virginia Ruzici	(Australia) Kerry Melville Reid (Australia) Wendy Turnbull	4–6, 9–8^{(10–8)}, 6–3

== WTA career finals ==
=== Singles: 14 (5–9) ===
Winner — Legend Grand Slam tournaments (1–2) WTA Tour Championships (0–0) Virginia Slims, Avon, Other (4–7)	Titles by surface Hard (0–0) Grass (0–0) Clay (4–5) Carpet (1–4)

Result	W/L	Date	Tournament	Surface	Opponent	Score
Loss	0–1	Jul 1974	Kitzbühel, Austria	Clay	(Czechoslovakia) Mirka Koželuhová	3–6, 0–6
Win	1–1	May 1976	Rome, Italy	Clay	(Australia) Lesley Hunt	6–1, 6–3
Win	2–1	Aug 1976	Toronto, Canada	Clay	(Australia) Lesley Hunt	6–2, 6–0
Win	3–1	May 1977	French Open	Clay	(Romania) Florența Mihai	6–2, 6–7^{(5–7)}, 6–1
Loss	3–2	Aug 1977	Charlotte, US	Clay	(Czechoslovakia) Martina Navrátilová	6–3, 2–6, 1–6
Win	4–2	May 1978	Hamburg, West Germany	Clay	(Romania) Virginia Ruzici	6–2, 6–3
Loss	4–3	May 1978	French Open	Clay	(Romania) Virginia Ruzici	2–6, 2–6
Loss	4–4	Mar 1981	Boston, US	Carpet (i)	(United States) Chris Evert	4–6, 4–6
Loss	4–5	Oct 1981	Brighton, UK	Carpet (i)	(United Kingdom) Sue Barker	6–4, 1–6, 1–6
Loss	4–6	Feb 1982	Detroit, US	Carpet (i)	(United States) Andrea Jaeger	6–2, 4–6, 2–6
Win	5–6	Mar 1982	Los Angeles, US	Carpet (i)	(West Germany) Sylvia Hanika	6–2, 7–6^{(7–4)}
Loss	5–7	Mar 1982	Dallas, US	Carpet (i)	(United States) Martina Navratilova	3–6, 2–6
Loss	5–8	May 1983	French Open	Clay	(United States) Chris Evert	1–6, 2–6
Loss	5–9	Jul 1985	Bregenz, Austria	Clay	(Romania) Virginia Ruzici	2–6, 3–6

=== Doubles: 20 (11–9) ===
Winner — Legend Grand Slam tournaments (1–1) WTA Tour Championships (0–0) Virginia Slims, Avon, Other (10–8)	Titles by surface Hard (0–1) Grass (0–1) Clay (5–2) Carpet (6–5)

Result	No.	Date	Tournament	Surface	Partner	Opponents	Score
Win	1.	4 November 1974	Edinburgh	Carpet (i)	(Romania) Virginia Ruzici	(Colombia) María-Isabel Fernández (Argentina) Raquel Giscafré	6–4, 4–6, 6–4
Loss	1.	24 January 1977	Minneapolis	Carpet (i)	(Romania) Virginia Ruzici	(United States) Rosie Casals (Czechoslovakia) Martina Navrátilová	2–6, 1–6
Win	2.	15 May 1978	Hamburg	Clay	(Romania) Virginia Ruzici	(West Germany) Katja Ebbinghaus (West Germany) Helga Niessen Masthoff	6–4, 5–7, 6–0
Win	3.	22 May 1978	Rome	Clay	(Romania) Virginia Ruzici	(Romania) Florența Mihai (United States) Betsy Nagelsen	6–2, 2–6, 7–5
Win	4.	29 May 1978	French Open	Clay	(Romania) Virginia Ruzici	(France) Gail Sherriff Lovera (United States) Lesley Turner Bowrey	5–7, 6–4, 8–6
Loss	2.	26 June 1978	Wimbledon	Grass	(Romania) Virginia Ruzici	(Australia) Kerry Melville Reid (Australia) Wendy Turnbull	6–4, 8–9^{(8–10)}, 3–6
Loss	3.	23 October 1978	Filderstadt	Carpet (i)	(Romania) Virginia Ruzici	(United States) Tracy Austin (Netherlands) Betty Stöve	3–6, 3–6
Win	5.	1 January 1979	Washington, D.C.	Carpet (i)	(Romania) Virginia Ruzici	(United States) Renée Richards (United States) Sharon Walsh	4–6, 6–2, 6–4
Loss	4.	20 August 1979	Mahwah	Hard	(Czechoslovakia) Regina Maršíková	(United States) Tracy Austin (Netherlands) Betty Stöve	6–7, 6–2, 4–6
Loss	5.	7 January 1980	Cincinnati	Carpet (i)	(Czechoslovakia) Ann Kiyomura	(United States) Laura duPont (United States) Pam Shriver	3–6, 3–6
Win	6.	27 October 1980	Stockholm	Carpet (i)	(Romania) Virginia Ruzici	(Czechoslovakia) Hana Mandlíková (Netherlands) Betty Stöve	6–2, 6–1
Loss	6.	10 November 1980	Amsterdam	Carpet (i)	(United States) JoAnne Russell	(Czechoslovakia) Hana Mandlíková (Netherlands) Betty Stöve	6–7, 6–7
Loss	7.	6 April 1981	Hilton Head Island	Clay	(United States) Pam Shriver	(United States) Rosie Casals (Australia) Wendy Turnbull	5–7, 5–7
Loss	8.	19 October 1981	Brighton	Carpet (i)	(United States) Pam Shriver	(United States) Barbara Potter (United States) Anne Smith	7–6, 3–6, 4–6
Win	7.	26 October 1981	Filderstadt	Carpet (i)	(United States) Martina Navratilova	(United States) Barbara Potter (United States) Anne Smith	6–4, 6–1
Win	8.	1 February 1982	Detroit	Carpet (i)	(United States) Leslie Allen	(United States) Rosie Casals (Australia) Wendy Turnbull	6–4, 6–0
Win	9.	19 April 1982	Amelia Island	Clay	(United States) Leslie Allen	(United States) Barbara Potter (United States) Sharon Walsh	6–1, 7–5
Win	10.	30 January 1983	Houston	Carpet (i)	(United States) Anne White	(United States) Barbara Potter (United States) Sharon Walsh	6–4, 3–6, 7–6^{(7–4)}
Loss	9.	16 April 1984	Amelia Island	Clay	(United Kingdom) Anne Hobbs	(United States) Kathy Jordan (United States) Anne Smith	4–6, 6–4, 4–6
Win	11.	15 July 1985	Bregenz	Clay	(Romania) Virginia Ruzici	(Czechoslovakia) Andrea Holíková (Czechoslovakia) Kateřina Skronská	6–2, 6–3

== Grand Slam singles tournament timeline ==
Key
W	F	SF	QF	#R	RR	Q#	DNQ	A	NH

(W) winner; (F) finalist; (SF) semifinalist; (QF) quarterfinalist; (#R) rounds 4, 3, 2, 1; (RR) round-robin stage; (Q#) qualification round; (DNQ) did not qualify; (A) absent; (NH) not held; (SR) strike rate (events won / competed); (W–L) win–loss record.

Tournament	1974	1975	1976	1977		1978	1979	1980	1981	1982	1983	1984	1985	1986	1987	1988	Career SR
Australian Open	A	A	A	A	A	A	A	SF	3R	2R	A	A	A	NH	A	1R	0 / 4
French Open	2R	2R	2R	W		F	2R	3R	QF	4R	F	3R	2R	3R	1R	A	1 / 14
Wimbledon	3R	4R	4R	3R		QF	2R	A	QF	2R	3R	1R	1R	1R	A	A	0 / 12
US Open	2R	1R	SF	QF		2R	2R	QF	2R	2R	3R	3R	2R	A	A	A	0 / 12
SR	0 / 3	0 / 3	0 / 3	1 / 3		0 / 3	0 / 3	0 / 3	0 / 4	0 / 4	0 / 3	0 / 3	0 / 3	0 / 2	0 / 1	0 / 1	1 / 42
Year End Ranking		40	11	11		19	20	17	11	12	24	87	71	184	233	362	

Note: The Australian Open was held twice in 1977, in January and December.

== See also ==
- Performance timelines for all female tennis players since 1978 who reached at least one Grand Slam final

Awards
Preceded by Branka Batinić	Yugoslav Sportswoman of the Year; 1976, 1977	Succeeded by Bojana Šumonja
