= Mary Struthers =

American tennis player

- Country (sports): United States
- Born: July 21, 1950 (age 74); San Diego, California

Singles

Grand Slam singles results
- French Open: 1R (1977)
- Wimbledon: 1R (1977)
- US Open: 2R (1976)

Doubles

Grand Slam doubles results
- French Open: 1R (1977)
- US Open: 1R (1976)

Mary Struthers (born July 21, 1950) is an American former professional tennis player.

A San Diego native, Struthers was active on tour in the 1970s, making main draw appearances at the French Open and Wimbledon. She featured in the second round of the 1976 US Open, where she was beaten by Glynis Coles. In 1977 she was a singles finalist at the Swedish Open in Båstad.
