= Regina Maršíková =

Czechoslovak tennis player

Regina Maršiková
- Country (sports): Czechoslovakia
- Born: 11 December 1958 (age 67) Prague, Czechoslovakia
- Height: 1.75 m (5 ft 9 in)
- Turned pro: 1974
- Retired: 1993
- Plays: Right-handed (one-handed backhand)
- Prize money: $606,049

Singles
- Career record: 369–234
- Career titles: 11
- Highest ranking: No. 11 (31 August 1981)

Grand Slam singles results
- Australian Open: 2R (1977^{Jan})
- French Open: SF (1977, 1978, 1979)
- Wimbledon: 4R (1978)
- US Open: 4R (1978, 1979)

Doubles
- Career record: 125–151
- Career titles: 6
- Highest ranking: No. 86 (13 April 1987)

Grand Slam doubles results
- Australian Open: 1R (1977^{Jan}, 1987, 1989)
- French Open: W (1977)
- Wimbledon: 3R (1977)
- US Open: SF (1980)

Mixed doubles

Grand Slam mixed doubles results
- French Open: QF (1974, 1977, 1978, 1979, 1986)
- Wimbledon: 2R (1978, 1979)
- US Open: 3R (1978)

Team competitions
- Fed Cup: W (1985)

Regina Maršíková (born 11 December 1958) is a retired tennis player from Czechoslovakia, present-day Czech Republic.

== Career ==
Maršíková won the French Junior Championships in 1975. She had career wins over Martina Navratilova, Billie Jean King, Evonne Goolagong, Hana Mandlíková, Tracy Austin, and Virginia Wade.

Her best performances in Grand Slam singles events included three consecutive semifinals at the French Open from 1977 to 1979. She won the 1977 French Open women's doubles title with Pam Teeguarden.

Maršíková was involved in an automobile accident in September 1981 near Prague, Czechoslovakia that caused a fatality. She lost her drivers license and visa and served several months in detention. She was not allowed to leave the Eastern Bloc until early 1985. Maršíková rejoined the WTA Tour in April that year at the Tournament of Champions in Florida.

She won 11 singles titles and six doubles titles. She reached a career-high singles ranking of world no. 11 in 1981.

== Grand Slam finals ==
=== Women's doubles (1 title) ===
Result	Year	Championship	Surface	Partner	Opponents	Score
Win	1977	French Open	Clay	(United States) Pam Teeguarden	(United States) Rayni Fox (Australia) Helen Gourlay Cawley	5–7, 6–4, 6–2

== WTA Tour finals ==
=== Singles: 14 (11 titles, 3 runner-ups) ===
Legend Grand Slam tournaments (0–0) WTA Tour Championships (0–0) Virginia Slims, Avon, Other (11–3)	Titles by surface Hard (3–1) Grass (2–0) Clay (6–2) Carpet (0–0)

Results	W-L	Date	Tournament	Surface	Opponent	Score
Win	1–0	Aug 1977	Toronto, Canada	Clay	(South Africa) Marise Kruger	6–4, 4–6, 6–2
Win	2–0	Dec 1977	Brisbane, Australia	Grass	(Sweden) Helena Anliot	6–1, 3–6, 6–4
Win	3–0	Mar 1978	Stuart, US	Clay	(United States) Zenda Liess	1–6, 6–3, 6–3
Win	4–0	May 1978	Rome, Italy	Clay	(Romania) Virginia Ruzici	7–5, 7–5
Win	5–0	Aug 1978	Toronto, Canada	Hard	(Romania) Virginia Ruzici	7–5, 6–7^{(9–11)}, 6–2
Win	6–0	Nov 1978	Christchurch, New Zealand	Grass	(West Germany) Sylvia Hanika	6–2, 6–1
Win	7–0	Mar 1979	Fort Myers, US	Clay	(United States) Janet Newberry	6–4, 6–2
Loss	7–1	Mar 1979	Orlando, US	Hard	(United States) Kathy Jordan	4–6, 6–1, 6–4
Loss	7–2	May 1979	Berlin, West Germany	Clay	(United States) Caroline Stoll	7–6^{(7–4)}, 6–0
Win	8–2	Feb 1980	Calgary, Canada	Hard (I)	(Switzerland) Christiane Jolissaint	4–6, 7–6, 6–2
Win	9–2	Mar 1980	Edmond, Canada	Clay	(United States) Andrea Jaeger	6–2, 6–2
Loss	9–3	Apr 1980	Hilton Head Island, US	Clay	(United States) Tracy Austin	3–6, 6–1, 6–0
Win	10–2	Oct 1980	Phoenix, US	Hard	(Australia) Wendy Turnbull	7–6^{(10–8)}, 7–6^{(7–3)}
Win	11–2	May 1981	Berlin, West Germany	Clay	(Argentina) Ivanna Madruga	6–2, 6–1

=== Doubles: 12 (6 titles, 6 runner-ups) ===
Legend Grand Slam tournaments (1–0) WTA Tour Championships (0–0) Virginia Slims, Avon, Other (5–7)	Titles by surface Hard (4–1) Grass (1–0) Clay (1–4) Carpet (0–1)

Results	W-L	Date	Tournament	Surface	Partner	Opponents	Score
Loss	0–1	May 1977	Hamburg, West Germany	Clay	(Czechoslovakia) Renáta Tomanová	(South Africa) Linky Boshoff (South Africa) Ilana Kloss	2–6, 6–4, 7–5
Win	1–1	May 1977	French Open	Clay	(United States) Pam Teeguarden	(United States) Rayni Fox (Australia) Helen Gourlay Cawley	5–7, 6–4, 6–2
Loss	1–2	Aug 1977	Charlotte, US	Clay	(United States) Pam Teeguarden	(United States) Martina Navrátilová (Netherlands) Betty Stöve	6–3, 6–4
Win	2–2	Dec 1977	Brisbane, Australia	Grass	(Sweden) Helena Anliot	(Australia) Nerida Gregory (Japan) Naoko Satō	6–3, 3–1 ret.
Loss	2–3	Jul 1978	Kitzbühel, Austria	Clay	(Romania) Florența Mihai	(Romania) Virginia Ruzici (Czechoslovakia) Renáta Tomanová	7–5, 6–2
Win	3–3	Aug 1978	Toronto, Canada	Hard	(United States) Pam Teeguarden	(Australia) Chris O'Neil (United States) Paula Smith	5–7, 6–4, 6–2
Loss	3–4	Oct 1978	Buenos Aires, Argentina	Clay	(United States) Laura duPont	(France) Françoise Dürr (United States) Valerie Ziegenfuss	1–6, 6–4, 6–3
Win	4–4	Mar 1979	Carlsbad, Sweden	Hard	(United States) Marcie Louie	(United States) Peanut Louie (United States) Marita Redondo	6–2, 2–6, 6–4
Loss	4–5	Aug 1979	Mahwah, US	Hard	(Socialist Federal Republic of Yugoslavia) Mima Jaušovec	(United States) Tracy Austin (Netherlands) Betty Stöve	7–6, 2–6, 6–4
Win	5–5	Aug 1980	Toronto, Canada	Hard	(United States) Andrea Jaeger	(United States) Ann Kiyomura (United States) Betsy Nagelsen	6–1, 6–3
Win	6–5	Oct 1980	Deerfield Beach, US	Hard	(United States) Andrea Jaeger	(United States) Martina Navrátilová (United States) Candy Reynolds	1–6, 6–1, 6–2
Loss	6–6	Feb 1981	Houston, US	Carpet (i)	(United States) Mary-Lou Piatek	(United Kingdom) Sue Barker (United States) Ann Kiyomura	5–7, 6–3, 6–4

== Grand Slam singles tournament timeline ==
Key
W	F	SF	QF	#R	RR	Q#	DNQ	A	NH

(W) winner; (F) finalist; (SF) semifinalist; (QF) quarterfinalist; (#R) rounds 4, 3, 2, 1; (RR) round-robin stage; (Q#) qualification round; (DNQ) did not qualify; (A) absent; (NH) not held; (SR) strike rate (events won / competed); (W–L) win–loss record.

Tournament	1974	1975	1976	1977		1978	1979	1980	1981	1982	1983	1984	1985	1986	1987	1988	1989	1990	1991	1992	1993	Career SR
Australian Open	A	A	A	2R	A	A	A	A	A	A	A	A	1R	NH	1R	A	1R	A	A	A	A	0 / 4
French Open	1R	A	QF	SF		SF	SF	A	4R	A	A	A	A	3R	2R	1R	1R	A	A	A	A	0 / 10
Wimbledon	A	A	3R	1R		4R	3R	2R	1R	A	A	A	A	1R	2R	A	A	A	A	A	A	0 / 8
US Open	A	A	3R	1R		4R	4R	2R	1R	A	A	A	2R	2R	1R	A	A	A	A	A	A	0 / 9
SR	0 / 1	0 / 0	0 / 3	0 / 4		0 / 3	0 / 3	0 / 2	0 / 3	0 / 0	0 / 0	0 / 0	0 / 2	0 / 3	0 / 4	0 / 1	0 / 2	0 / 0	0 / 0	0 / 0	0 / 0	0 / 31
Year-end ranking		NR	23	20		14	14	18	13	NR	NR	NR	80	61	71	176	227	359	502	NR	NR	

- Note: The Australian Open was held twice in 1977, in January and December.
