= Pam Teeguarden =

American tennis player

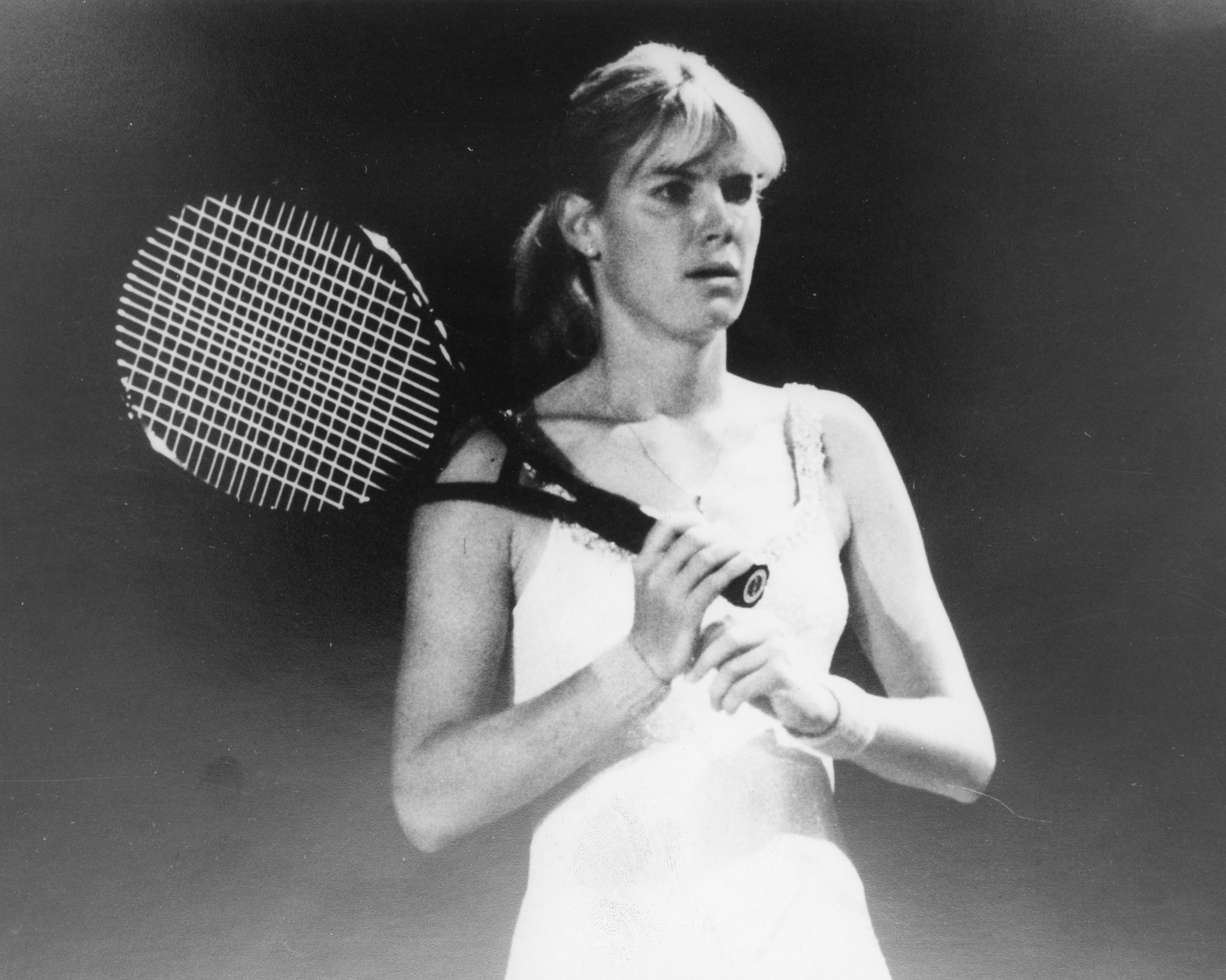
- Country (sports): United States
- Born: April 17, 1951 (age 74) Jacksonville, Florida, U.S.
- Height: 5 ft 10 in (1.78 m)
- Plays: Right-handed
- Prize money: US$ 231,108

Singles
- Career record: 99–139

Grand Slam singles results
- French Open: QF (1977)
- US Open: QF (1972)

Doubles
- Career record: 97–119
- Career titles: 10

Grand Slam doubles results
- Australian Open: QF (1981)
- French Open: W (1977)
- Wimbledon: QF
- US Open: SF (1981)

Mixed doubles

Grand Slam mixed doubles results
- French Open: F (1975)
- US Open: W (1974)

Pam Teeguarden (born April 17, 1951) is an American former professional tennis player in the 1970s and 1980s, ranked in the top 20 from 1970–1975. She won two Grand Slam Doubles Titles and was a quarter finalist in singles at the U.S. Open and The French Open. Her father Jerry, a well known coach, helped Margaret Court win the coveted Grand Slam (all four Grand Slam titles in one year) in 1970 and Virginia Wade to her 1977 Wimbledon triumph. Teeguarden played in 19 consecutive US Opens, holding the record until Chris Evert played in 20. She wore the first all black outfit in the history of tennis in 1975 at The Bridgestone Doubles Championships in Tokyo, starting a trend that is still popular today. Teeguarden was the first woman tennis player signed by Nike. She played on the victorious Los Angeles Strings Team Tennis team in 1981 and won the Team Tennis Mixed Doubles Division with Tom Gullikson in 1977; they were also runners-up in the league that year.

Teeguarden won two grand slam titles:

- US Open Mixed in 1974 (with Geoff Masters)
- French Open in 1977 (with Regina Maršíková)

Among Teeguarden's doubles titles are the Canadian Open Doubles, the Swedish Open Doubles, the Austrian Open Doubles, the Argentinian Open Doubles, the Women's Games Doubles in Salt Lake City, and the Virginia Slims of Tucson Doubles. Pam was ranked second in the US twice behind Billie Jean King and Rosemary Casals and third on one other occasion with three different partners. She and her partner, Mona Guerrant won the Virginia Slims of Houston defeating Francoise Durr and Betty Stove the same week that Billie Jean King played Bobby Riggs at the Houston Astrodome.

== WTA Tour finals ==
=== Singles 2 ===
Legend
Grand Slam	0
WTA Championships	
Tier I	0
Tier II	1
Tier III	0
Tier IV & V	0

Result	W–L	Date	Tournament	Surface	Opponent	Score
Loss	0–1	Jun 1978	Chichester, England	Grass	(Australia) Evonne Goolagong	4–6, 4–6
Loss	0–2	Jan 1984	Nashville, Tennessee, US	Hard	(United States) Jenny Klitch	2–6, 1–6

=== Doubles 4 (3–1) ===
Legend
Grand Slam	1
WTA Championships	4
Tier I	
Tier II	0
Tier III	0
Tier IV & V	0

Titles by surface
Hard	2
Clay	1
Grass	0
Carpet	0

Result	W–L	Date	Tournament	Surface	Partner	Opponents	Score
Win	1–0	Jun 1977	French Open, France	Clay	(Czechoslovakia) Regina Maršíková	(United States) Rayni Fox (Australia) Helen Gourlay	5–7, 6–4, 6–2
Loss	1–1	Jan 1978	Los Angeles, California, US	Hard	(South Africa) Greer Stevens	(Netherlands) Betty Stöve (United Kingdom) Virginia Wade	3–6, 2–6
Win	2–1	Aug 1978	Canadian Open, Canada	Hard	(Czechoslovakia) Regina Maršíková	(Australia) Chris O'Neil (United States) Paula Smith	7–5, 6–7, 6–2
Win	3–1	Sep 1980	Salt Lake City, Utah, US	Hard	(Romania) Virginia Ruzici	(United States) Kathy Jordan (United States) JoAnne Russell	6–4, 7–5

=== Mixed doubles 2 (1–1) ===
Legend
Grand Slam	1
WTA Championships	0
Tier I	0
Tier II	0
Tier III	0
Tier IV & V	0

Titles by surface
Hard	0
Clay	0
Grass	1
Carpet	0

Result	W–L	Date	Tournament	Surface	Partner	Opponents	Score
Win	1–0	Sep 1974	US Open, US	Grass	(Australia) Geoff Masters	(United States) Jimmy Connors (United States) Chris Evert	6–1, 7–6
Loss	1–1	Jun 1975	French Open, France	Clay	(Chile) Jaime Fillol	(Brazil) Thomaz Koch (Uruguay) Fiorella Bonicelli	4–6, 6–7
