= Bunny Bruning =

American tennis player

- Full name: Anna-Marie Bruning
- Country (sports): United States
- Born: September 5, 1957 (age 69)

Grand Slam singles results
- Australian Open: 2R (1977)
- French Open: 1R (1977)
- Wimbledon: 2R (1976, 1978)
- US Open: 2R (1976)

Grand Slam doubles results
- French Open: 2R (1977)
- Wimbledon: 2R (1976)
- US Open: 2R (1977, 1979)

Anna-Marie "Bunny" Bruning (born September 5, 1957) is an American former professional tennis player.

Bruning grew up in California and was active on the WTA Tour during the 1970s and 1980s. She competed in the main draws of all four grand slam tournaments and was runner-up in the Wimbledon Plate in 1976.

Now a resident of Adel, Iowa, Bruning has worked in the region as a tennis coach since leaving professional tennis. She worked as Tennis Director of the Wakonda Club in Des Moines, Iowa from 1982 until her retirement in 2024. She was inducted into Iowa’s USTA Hall of Fame in 2024.

== Personal life ==
Bruning has been with her partner, Marla, for more than 30 years. They got married in Iowa in May 2009, a month after same-sex marriage became legal there. She received the USTA Champion of Equality honor in 2024.

== WTA Tour finals ==
=== Doubles (0–2) ===
Result	W/L	Date	Tournament	Surface	Partner	Opponents	Score
Loss	0–1	May 1977	Rome, Italy	Clay	(United States) Sharon Walsh	(South Africa) Brigitte Cuypers (South Africa) Marise Kruger	6–3, 5–7, 2–6
Loss	0–2	Sep 1979	Pittsburgh, U.S.	Hard	(United States) Jane Stratton	(United Kingdom) Sue Barker (United States) Candy Reynolds	3–6, 2–6
