= Iris Riedel-Kühn =

German tennis player

- Country (sports): West Germany
- Born: 16 March 1954 (age 71); São Paulo, Brazil

Singles

Grand Slam singles results
- French Open: 2R (1977, 1978)
- Wimbledon: 2R (1975–79)
- US Open: 2R (1976, 1977)

Doubles

Grand Slam doubles results
- Wimbledon: 2R (1976)

Iris Riedel-Kühn (born 16 March 1954) is a retired female tennis player from Germany.

Riedel-Kühn was born on 16 March 1954 in São Paulo, Brazil and received her education in Brazil. In 1974, she started playing tennis in West Germany and became a member of the Lawn Tennis Turnier Club Rot-Weiß in Berlin. In 1975, she became national junior champion, and in 1976 and 1977, won the German national mixed doubles title. From 1975 to 1981, she competed in six Wimbledon Championships and reached the second round on five occasions.

Between 1972 and 1981, she participated in the German Fed Cup team and compiled a 7-6 won-loss record. She reached the singles final of the 1975 Torneo Godó in Barcelona which she lost in three sets to Janice Metcalf.

She married Klaus Kühn on 22 February 1980 in Berlin.
