= Raquel Giscafré =

Argentine tennis player

- Country (sports): Argentina
- Born: 15 May 1949 (age 77) Santa Fe, Argentina
- Turned pro: 1971
- Retired: 1983

Singles
- Career titles: 1

Grand Slam singles results
- Australian Open: 1R (1966)
- French Open: SF (1974)
- Wimbledon: 4R (1974)
- US Open: 2R (1976, 1978)

Doubles
- Career titles: 0

Grand Slam doubles results
- French Open: SF (1977)
- US Open: SF (1977)

Raquel Giscafré (born 15 May 1949) is a former professional tennis player from Argentina. She was Argentina's No. 1 female player from 1972 to 1975. She competed in the Fed Cup from 1966 to 1978. She was a tennis promoter and ran the WTA's Acura Classic each year from 1984 until 2007.
