= Mary Carillo =

American sportscaster and former professional tennis player

- Country (sports): United States
- Residence: Naples, Florida; New York City
- Born: March 15, 1957 (age 69) New York, U.S.
- Height: 6 ft 0 in (1.83 m)
- Turned pro: 1977
- Retired: 1980
- Plays: Left-handed
- Int. Tennis HoF: 2026 (member page)

Singles
- Highest ranking: No. 33 (January 1980)

Grand Slam singles results
- French Open: 2R (1977)
- Wimbledon: 3R (1979)
- US Open: 1R (1977, 1979)

Grand Slam doubles results
- US Open: QF (1977)

Mixed doubles
- Career titles: 1

Grand Slam mixed doubles results
- French Open: W (1977)
- Wimbledon: QF (1977)

Mary Carillo (born March 15, 1957) is an American sportscaster and former professional tennis player. She is an analyst for Tennis on NBC and a reporter for NBC Olympic broadcasts.

== Career ==
=== Tennis ===
Carillo played on the women's professional tennis circuit from 1977 to 1980. Her highest world rank was No. 33 in the Women's Tennis Association Rankings from January through March 1980. She then retired, citing knee injuries.

Carillo never won a major singles title, but did win the 1977 French Open mixed-doubles title with John McEnroe. Carillo and McEnroe made it to the quarterfinals at Wimbledon before being defeated, and later that year Carillo was a women's doubles quarterfinalist at the US Open.

=== Sportscasting ===
==== Tennis coverage ====
Carillo began her television career working for USA Network from 1980 to 1987, PBS from 1981 to 1986 and MSG from 1981 to 1988. She then worked for ESPN from 1988 to 1997 and again from 2003 to 2010. She also worked on US Open coverage for CBS Sports from 1986 to 2014. In addition, Carillo worked as both a host and analyst on HBO's Wimbledon coverage from 1996 to 1999, and on Turner Sports' Wimbledon coverage from 2000 to 2002. In May 2003, Carillo joined NBC Sports as an analyst on its French Open and Wimbledon coverage, having made her debut as an analyst on NBC for the 1996 Family Circle Cup tennis event. She also does commentary on The Tennis Channel and appears regularly on The Tennis Podcast, hosted on Acast.

Carillo's candid and insightful commentary has earned her accolades throughout the industry, including the distinction of being called "the sport's top analyst" by Sports Illustrated. She is known for her deep voice, quick wit and pointed sense of humor. Like her longtime friend and fellow Douglaston, Queens, New York City native John McEnroe, Carillo is known for her colorful turns of phrase, and is credited with coining "Big Babe Tennis" to describe the era in women's tennis dominated by large, powerful players such as Lindsay Davenport, Serena Williams and Venus Williams. Carillo's unabashed and opinionated style of commentary has drawn criticism from several top players, including Andre Agassi, Serena and Venus Williams, and Maria Sharapova. Nevertheless, she was named Best Commentator by Tennis Magazine (1988–91), Best Commentator by World Tennis magazine (1986) and Broadcaster of the Year by the Women's Tennis Association (1981 and 1985).

As a result of the ATP's handling of domestic abuse allegations against Alexander Zverev, Carillo stepped down from her presenting role at the 2021 Laver Cup, in which Zverev played, saying she wanted no part in the "whitewashing of very serious allegations".

==== Olympic coverage ====
Carillo served as Olympic tennis analyst at both the Atlanta and Sydney Summer Olympics and as the skiing reporter for CBS's coverage at the Albertville, Lillehammer and Nagano Winter Olympics.

During NBC's coverage of the 2002 Salt Lake City Winter Olympics she covered bobsled, luge and skeleton competitions. Her comment that men's doubles luge is "like a bar bet gone bad" was recognized as "line of the year" in many sports television columns. In addition, Carillo's work co-hosting the 2002 Closing Ceremony alongside Dan Hicks earned her critical acclaim.

At the 2004 Athens Games, Carillo earned critical praise in her debut as a full-time Olympic host on Bravo's coverage in addition to anchoring USA Network's live, Grand Slam-style coverage of the tennis gold medal finals. She delivered a lengthy, well-received commentary on badminton during this coverage.

At the 2006 Winter Games in Turin, Carillo hosted Olympic Ice, a daily figure skating show on the USA Network. She co-hosted the daily figure-skating television program with Scott Hamilton, Dick Button, and Jamie Salé and David Pelletier.

Carillo served as late-night show host, closing ceremony host, and "Friend of Bob" for the 2008 Beijing Games, her ninth Olympic assignment and sixth with NBC. Her role focused on cultural commentary and "slice of life" pieces about China. She repeated these duties—late-night host and human-interest reporter—for NBC's coverage of the 2010 Winter Olympics in Vancouver, the 2012 Summer Olympics in London, and the 2014 Winter Olympics in Sochi. She was also one of the torch bearers during the torch's tour through Canada.

Carillo was brought in to co-host the 2026 Winter Olympics opening ceremonies for NBC after Today presenter Savannah Guthrie stepped away in the wake of her mother's disappearance.

==== Other activities ====
Since 1997, Carillo has been a correspondent on HBO's Real Sports with Bryant Gumbel, winning a Sports Emmy Award for her Real Sports feature on the Hoyt Family.

In 2009, 2013, and 2016, she co-hosted the 133rd, 137th and 140th Westminster Kennel Club Dog Show broadcast on USA Networks.

Carillo is a commentator for the Hallmark Channel special Paw Star Game premiering July 12, 2015. "At best, baby cats have the barest, most rudimentary grasp of the rules and regulations of American football and baseball", said Carillo. "And that's really okay with me. Frankly, watching kittens play any sport is going to be endearing and adorable." Carillo is also a commentator for Hallmark's Kitten Bowl.

== Personal life ==
Carillo was born in New York City in the borough of Brooklyn. She now splits her time between Naples, Florida and New York City's Greenwich Village. She was married for 15 years to tennis instructor Bill Bowden, with whom she has two children, Anthony (b. 1987) and Rachel (b. 1991). They divorced in 1998.

== Legacy ==
In November 2025, Carillo was elected into the International Tennis Hall of Fame's class of 2026.

== Career statistics ==
=== Grand Slam tournament finals ===
==== Mixed doubles ====
Result	Year	Tournament	Surface	Partner	Opponents	Score
Win	1977	French Open, France	Clay	(United States) John McEnroe	(Colombia) Iván Molina (Romania) Florența Mihai	7–6, 6–3

=== WTA Tour finals ===
==== Doubles ====
Result	W–L	Date	Tournament	Tier	Surface	Partner	Opponents	Score
Loss	0–1	Aug 1977	U.S. Women's Clay Court Championships, US	None	Clay	(United States) Wendy Overton	(South Africa) Linky Boshoff (South Africa) Ilana Kloss	7–5, 5–7, 3–6

== Bibliography ==
Carillo has written three books, all related to tennis:

- Tennis My Way (1984), for which she is second author to Martina Navratilova
- Rick Elstein's Tennis Kinetics: With Martina Navratilova (1985), for which she is uncredited
- Tennis Confidential II: More of Today's Greatest Players, Matches, and Controversies (2008), for which she is second author to Paul Fein

== Filmography ==
Carillo appeared as herself in the romantic-comedy film Wimbledon (2004).

== Board membership ==
- She is a former member of the Women's Tennis Association's Board of Directors.
- In 2010, she was named President of USTA Serves – Foundation for Academics, Character and Excellence

== Awards and honors ==
- Twice named Broadcaster of the Year by the Women's Tennis Association (1981, 1985)
- Named "Best Commentator" by World Tennis Magazine (1986), Toronto Star (1986) and Tennis magazine (1988–91)
- 2008 inductee to National Italian American Sports Hall of Fame.
- Carillo received two Peabody Awards for co-writing, with Frank Deford, the HBO documentary Dare to Compete: The Struggle of Women in Sport, as well as a Billie Jean King documentary.
- Won a Sports Emmy Award for her feature on the Hoyt family
- Won the 2010 Dick Schaap Award for Outstanding Journalism – first female recipient of the award
- Won the ITF's 2015 Philippee Chatrier Award, for her outstanding contribution to tennis.
- Won a 2016 (Annalee) Thurston Award, for her storied sportscasting career.
- Won 2017 Eugene L. Scott Award by the International Tennis Hall of Fame
- 2018 inducted into Sports Broadcasting Hall of Fame
