= 1978 in tennis =

This page covers all the important events in the sport of tennis in 1978. It provides the results of notable tournaments throughout the year on both the men's and the women's tennis circuits.

== Australian Open ==
| Category | Champion(s) | Finalist(s) | Score |
|---|---|---|---|
| Men's singles | (Argentina) Guillermo Vilas | (Australia) John Marks | 6–4, 6–4, 3–6, 6–3 (Note: It was Vilas' 3rd career Grand Slam singles title and his 1st title at the Australian Open.) |
| Women's singles | (Australia) Chris O'Neil | (United States) Betsy Nagelsen | 6–3, 7–6^{(7–3)} (Note: It was O'Neil's 1st and only career Grand Slam singles title.) |
| Men's doubles | (Poland) Wojciech Fibak (Australia) Kim Warwick | (Australia) Paul Kronk (Australia) Cliff Letcher | 7–6, 7–5 (Note: It was Fibak's only career Grand Slam doubles title.) (Note: It was Warwick's 1st career Grand Slam doubles title.) |
| Women's doubles | (United States) Betsy Nagelsen (Czechoslovakia) Renáta Tomanová | (Japan) Naoko Sato (Australia) Pam Whytcross | 7–5, 6–2 (Note: It was Nagelsen's 1st career Grand Slam doubles title.) (Note: It was Tomanová's 1st and only career Grand Slam doubles title.) |
| Mixed doubles | This event was not held from 1970 until 1985. | | |

== French Open ==
| Category | Champion(s) | Finalist(s) | Score |
|---|---|---|---|
| Men's singles | (Sweden) Björn Borg | (Argentina) Guillermo Vilas | 6–1, 6–1, 6–3 (Note: It was Borg's 5th career Grand Slam title, and his 3rd French Open title.) |
| Women's singles | (Romania) Virginia Ruzici | (Socialist Federal Republic of Yugoslavia) Mima Jaušovec | 6–2, 6–2 (Note: It was Ruzici's 1st (and only) career Grand Slam title.) |
| Men's doubles | (United States) Gene Mayer (United States) Hank Pfister | (Spain) José Higueras (Spain) Manuel Orantes | 6–3, 6–2, 6–2 |
| Women's doubles | (Socialist Federal Republic of Yugoslavia) Mima Jaušovec (Romania) Virginia Ruzici | (Australia) Lesley Turner Bowrey (France) Gail Sherriff Lovera | 5–7, 6–4, 8–6 |
| Mixed doubles | (Czechoslovakia) Renáta Tomanová (Czechoslovakia) Pavel Složil | (Romania) Virginia Ruzici (France) Patrice Dominguez | 7–6, retired |

== Wimbledon ==
| Category | Champion(s) | Finalist(s) | Score |
|---|---|---|---|
| Men's singles | (Sweden) Björn Borg | (United States) Jimmy Connors | 6–2, 6–2, 6–3 |
| Women's singles | (United States) Martina Navratilova | (United States) Chris Evert | 2–6, 6–4, 7–5 (Note: It was Navratilova's 1st Grand Slam singles title.) |
| Men's doubles | (South Africa) Bob Hewitt (South Africa) Frew McMillan | (United States) John McEnroe (United States) Peter Fleming | 6–1, 6–4, 6–2 |
| Women's doubles | (Australia) Kerry Reid (Australia) Wendy Turnbull | (Socialist Federal Republic of Yugoslavia) Mima Jaušovec (Romania) Virginia Ruzici | 4–6, 9–8^{(12–10)}, 6–3 |
| Mixed doubles | (South Africa) Frew McMillan (Netherlands) Betty Stöve | (Australia) Ray Ruffels (United States) Billie Jean King | 6–2, 6–2 |

== US Open ==
| Category | Champion(s) | Finalist(s) | Score |
|---|---|---|---|
| Men's singles | (United States) Jimmy Connors (Note: Due to Connors' victories in '74 on grass and '76 on clay, he is the only person—man or woman—to ever win this tournament on three different surfaces.) | (Sweden) Björn Borg | 6–4, 6–2, 6–2 (Note: It was Connors 5th career Grand Slam title, and his 3rd US Open title.) |
| Women's singles | (United States) Chris Evert | (United States) Pam Shriver | 7–5, 6–4 (Note: It was Evert's 8th career Grand Slam title, and her 4th (consecutive) US Open title.) |
| Men's doubles | (United States) Bob Lutz (United States) Stan Smith | (United States) Marty Riessen (United States) Sherwood Stewart | 1–6, 7–5, 6–3 |
| Women's doubles | (United States) Billie Jean King (United States) Martina Navratilova | (Australia) Kerry Melville Reid (Australia) Wendy Turnbull | 7–6, 6–4 |
| Mixed doubles | (Netherlands) Betty Stöve (South Africa) Frew McMillan | (United States) Billie Jean King (Australia) Ray Ruffels | 6–3, 7-6 |
