= 1978 French Open – Mixed doubles =

Mixed doubles
- 1978 French Open

Final
- Champion: (Czechoslovakia) Pavel Složil (Czechoslovakia) Renáta Tomanová
- Runner-up: (France) Patrice Dominguez (Romania) Virginia Ruzici
- Score: 7–6, retired

Details
- Draw: 27

Events
Singles	men	women		boys	girls
Doubles	men	women	mixed	boys	girls
WC Singles	men	women	quad
WC Doubles	men	women	quad
Legends	−45	45+	women
- French Open

John McEnroe and Mary Carillo were the defending champions but both players chose not to participate.

Virginia Ruzici, the winner of the women's singles and the women's doubles titles, reached the mixed doubles final, which she lost to Pavel Složil and Renáta Tomanová when her partner Patrice Dominguez retired with an injury.

== Draw ==
Key

- Q = Qualifier
- WC = Wild card
- LL = Lucky loser
- Alt = Alternate
- ITF = ITF entry
- PR = Protected ranking
- SR = Special ranking
- SE = Special exempt
- JE = Junior exempt
- JR = Junior Accelerator Programme entrant
- CO = College Accelerator Programme entrant
- NG = Next Gen Accelerator Program entrant
- w/o = Walkover
- r = Retired
- d = Defaulted

=== Finals ===
Semifinals
(Australia) Paul McNamee (Australia) Diane Evers	3	6	4
(Czechoslovakia) Pavel Složil (Czechoslovakia) Renáta Tomanová	6	2	6
(Australia) William Lloyd (United States) Patricia Bostrom	3	6	5
(France) Patrice Dominguez (Romania) Virginia Ruzici	6	3	7

Final
(Czechoslovakia) Pavel Složil (Czechoslovakia) Renáta Tomanová	7
(France) Patrice Dominguez (Romania) Virginia Ruzici	6^{r}

=== Top half ===
First round
(New Zealand) C Lewis (Sweden) H Anliot	7	6
(France) A Jumatano (Portugal) D Fiúza	5	2
(Australia) P McNamee (Australia) D Evers	6	6
(Argentina) G Aubone (Argentina) M Voyame	4	1
(Chile) A Hartmann (Argentina) E Rapponi
(France) P Beust (France) G Benedetti	w/o
(France) J Lovera (Australia) L Bowrey	6	7
(Uruguay) H Roverano (Argentina) B Villaverde	4	6
(Argentina) F Dalla Fontana (Argentina) C Casabianca	4	3
(Czechoslovakia) P Složil (Czechoslovakia) R Tomanová	6	6

Second round
(New Zealand) C Lewis (Sweden) H Anliot	6	6
(France) P Hagelauer (Canada) M-H Thibault	4	2
(Australia) P McNamee (Australia) D Evers	6	6	6
(France) P Beust (France) G Benedetti	1	7	3
(France) É Deblicker (Czechoslovakia) R Maršíková	6	6
(France) J Lovera (Australia) L Bowrey	1	3
(France) D Naegelen (Argentina) R Giscafré	1	1
(Czechoslovakia) P Složil (Czechoslovakia) R Tomanová	6	6

Quarterfinals
(New Zealand) C Lewis (Sweden) H Anliot	3	7	2
(Australia) P McNamee (Australia) D Evers	6	6	6
(France) É Deblicker (Czechoslovakia) R Maršíková	2	4
(Czechoslovakia) P Složil (Czechoslovakia) R Tomanová	6	6

Semifinals
(Australia) P McNamee (Australia) D Evers	3	6	4
(Czechoslovakia) P Složil (Czechoslovakia) R Tomanová	6	2	6

=== Bottom half ===
First round
(Ecuador) R Ycaza (Uruguay) F Bonicelli	7	7
(Argentina) T Vázquez (Argentina) E Weisenberger	5	5
(Australia) W Lloyd (United States) P Bostrom	6	6
(Mexico) J Reyes (France) R Darmon	1	4
(France) P Joly (Italy) A-M Nasuelli	6	6
(Argentina) J Ganzábal (Chile) M Rodríguez	4	3
(Colombia) I Molina (United States) B Nagelsen	6	6
(France) D Bedel (France) M Bureau	2	3
(Argentina) E Bengoechea (Argentina) P Gomez	3	4
(France) Y Noah (France) B Simon	6	6
(Uruguay) JL Damiani (Argentina) I Madruga	4	7	6
(Morocco) O Laimina (France) D Beillan	6	6	8

Second round
(Ecuador) R Ycaza (Uruguay) F Bonicelli	5	1
(Australia) W Lloyd (United States) P Bostrom	7	6
(France) P Joly (Italy) A-M Nasuelli	1	2
(Paraguay) V Pecci (United States) P Teeguarden	6	6
(Colombia) I Molina (United States) B Nagelsen	4	4
(France) Y Noah (France) B Simon	6	6
(Morocco) O Laimina (France) D Beillan	3	0
(France) P Dominguez (Romania) V Ruzici	6	6

Quarterfinals
(Australia) W Lloyd (United States) P Bostrom	3	6	7
(Paraguay) V Pecci (United States) P Teeguarden	6	3	5
(France) Y Noah (France) B Simon	4	4
(France) P Dominguez (Romania) V Ruzici	6	6

Semifinals
(Australia) W Lloyd (United States) P Bostrom	3	6	5
(France) P Dominguez (Romania) V Ruzici	6	3	7
