= Tennis in Romania =

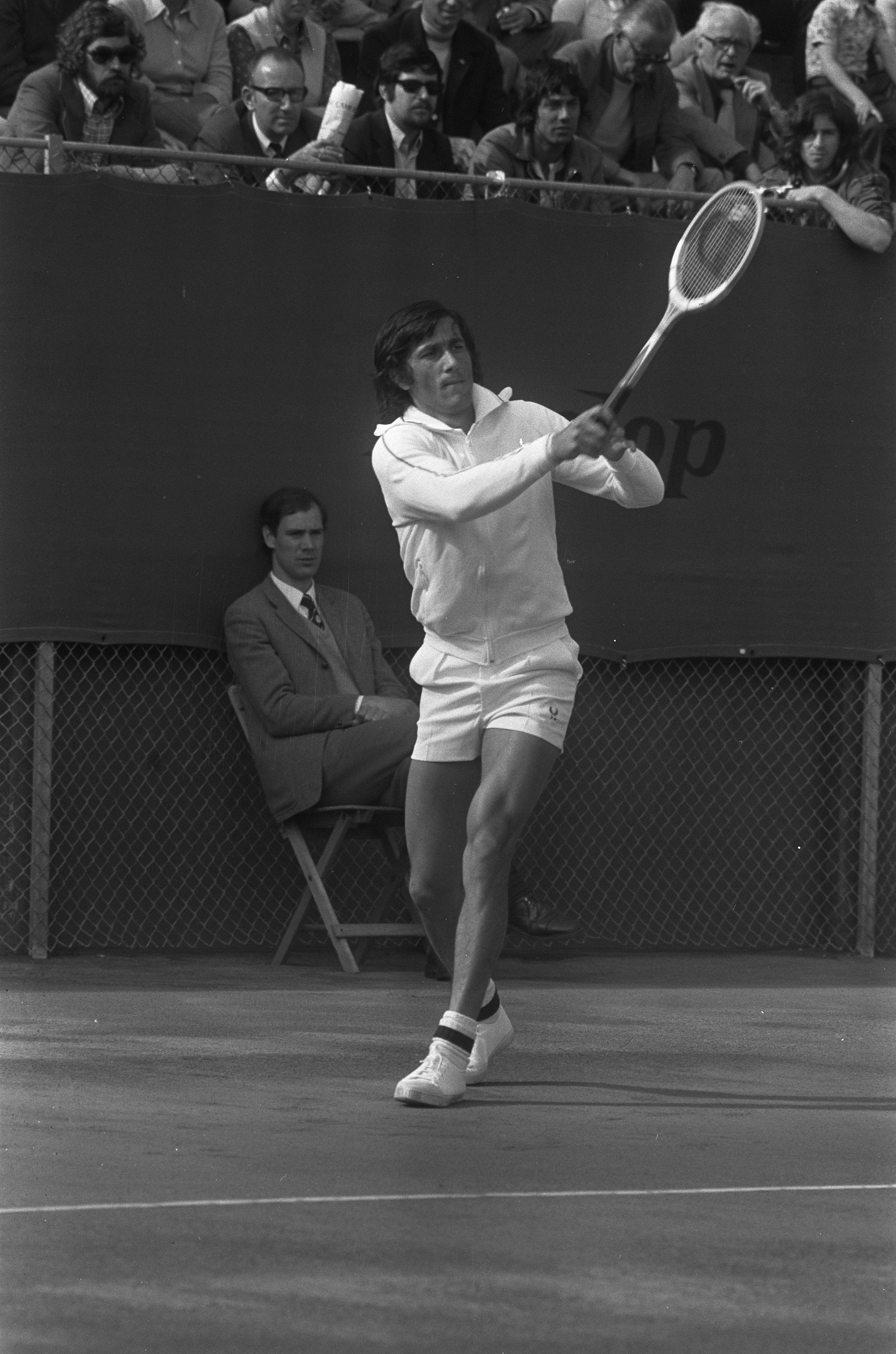
Ilie Năstase playing a Davis Cup match.

Tennis is one of the most popular sports in Romania. The Romanian Tennis Federation (Romanian: Federația Română de Tenis or FRT), a member of ITF, is the sport's national governing body.

== History ==
Tennis was introduced to Romania in the late 19th century by students returning from their time abroad.

Also, the Romania Davis Cup team made the finals of the competition in three editions: 3 (1969, 1971 and 1972) losing each time by the hands of the United States Davis Cup team.

Men's tennis saw its best period during the beginning of the Open Era when Ilie Năstase reached the number 1 ranking in 1973 after winning the US Open in 1972 and the French Open in 1973.

Women's tennis, in particular, has seen tremendous successes both in the 20th and 21st centuries, with the advent of Florența Mihai, Virginia Ruzici, Irina Spîrlea and Simona Halep. Three of these women reached the Top 10 of the WTA rankings in singles, namely Ruzici, Spîrlea and Halep whilst Mihai, Ruzici and Halep reached Grand Slam finals with Ruzici winning the French Open in 1978 and Halep winning the same tournament in 2018.

Tournaments held in Romania on the men's tour every year included Romanian Open from 1993 until 2016. The women have the Bucharest Open held between 2014 and 2019, and the Transylvania Open from 2021.

== List of Romanian singles tennis players (Open Era only) ==
Only includes players ranked in the top 100. Bold names indicate currently active players

Men

Highest ranking	Name	Birth	Place of birth	Turned pro	Titles
No. 1	Ilie Năstase	1946	Bucharest	1969	58
No. 13	Andrei Pavel	1974	Constanța	1995	3
No. 26	Victor Hănescu	1981	Bucharest	2000	1
No. 36	Adrian Voinea	1974	Focșani	1993	1
No. 55	Ion Țiriac	1939	Brașov	1968	1
No. 56	**Marius Copil**	1990	Arad	2008	0
No. 73	Florin Segărceanu	1961	Bucharest	1980	0
No. 74	Răzvan Sabău	1977	Bucharest	1993	0
No. 75	Dinu Pescariu	1974	Bucharest	1990	0
No. 75	Victor Crivoi	1982	Bucharest	2003	0
No. 79	Adrian Ungur	1985	Pitești	2003	0

Women

Highest ranking	Name	Birth	Place of birth	Turned pro	Titles
No. 1	Simona Halep	1991	Constanța	2006	24
No. 7	Irina Spîrlea	1974	Bucharest	1990	4
No. 8	Virginia Ruzici	1955	Câmpia Turzii	1975	12
No. 15	Ruxandra Dragomir	1972	Bucharest	1990	4
No. 17	**Sorana Cîrstea**	1990	Târgoviște	2004	4
No. 20	Mihaela Buzărnescu	1988	Bucharest	2004	1
No. 22	**Irina-Camelia Begu**	1990	Bucharest	2005	6
No. 26	Alexandra Dulgheru	1989	Bucharest	2004	2
No. 28	**Monica Niculescu**	1987	Slatina	2002	3
No. 28	**Jaqueline Cristian**	1998	Bucharest	2015	0
No. 29	Florența Mihai	1955	Bucharest	1975	1
No. 36	Mariana Simionescu	1956	Târgu Neamț	1974	2
No. 39	**Ana Bogdan**	1992	Sinaia	2007	0
No. 49	Lucia Romanov-Stark	1959	Bucharest	1979	0
No. 51	**Elena-Gabriela Ruse**	1997	Bucharest	2015	1
No. 53	Raluca Olaru	1989	Bucharest	2003	0
No. 54	Edina Gallovits-Hall	1984	Timișoara	1999	0
No. 56	**Patricia Maria Țig**	1994	Caransebeș	2009	1
No. 59	Cătălina Cristea	1975	Bucharest	1990	0
No. 59	Alexandra Cadanțu	1990	Bucharest	2005	0
No. 68	**Andreea Mitu**	1991	Bucharest	2006	0
No. 83	**Anca Todoni**	2004	Timișoara	2024	0
No. 91	Raluca Sandu	1980	Bucharest	1994	0

== List of Romanian doubles tennis players (Open Era only) ==
Only includes players ranked in the top 100 or that have won at least one ATP or WTA title. Bold names indicate currently active players

Men

Highest ranking	Name	Birth	Place of birth	Turned pro	Titles
No. 2	Horia Tecău	1985	Constanța	2003	38
No. 7	Florin Mergea	1985	Craiova	2003	7
No. 10	Ilie Năstase	1946	Bucharest	1969	45
No. 18	Andrei Pavel	1974	Constanța	1995	6
No. 19	Ion Țiriac	1939	Brașov	1968	22
No. 49	Florin Segărceanu	1961	Bucharest	1980	1
No. 64	**Victor Vlad Cornea**	1993	Sibiu	2016	0
No. 92	Victor Hănescu	1981	Bucharest	2000	2
No. 94	Adrian Ungur	1985	Pitești	2003	1
No. 97	Gabriel Trifu	1975	Bucharest	1994	1
No. 114	Dinu Pescariu	1974	Bucharest	1990	1
No. 159	Mihnea-Ion Năstase	1967	Bucharest	1986	1
No. 182	**Marius Copil**	1990	Arad	2008	1

Women

Highest ranking	Name	Birth	Place of birth	Turned pro	Titles
No. 11	**Monica Niculescu**	1987	Slatina	2002	12
No. 16	Irina Spîrlea	1974	Bucharest	1990	6
No. 21	Ruxandra Dragomir	1972	Bucharest	1990	5
No. 22	**Irina-Camelia Begu**	1990	Bucharest	2005	9
No. 24	**Mihaela Buzărnescu**	1988	Bucharest	2004	2
No. 30	**Raluca Olaru**	1989	Bucharest	2003	11
No. 32	**Elena-Gabriela Ruse**	1997	Bucharest	2015	0
No. 35	**Sorana Cîrstea**	1990	Târgoviște	2006	6
No. 40	Andreea Ehritt-Vanc	1973	Timișoara	1992	2
No. 40	Cătălina Cristea	1975	Bucharest	1990	1
No. 41	**Alexandra Dulgheru**	1989	Bucharest	2005	0
No. 56	**Irina Bara**	1995	Ștei	2010	1
No. 63	Edina Gallovits-Hall	1984	Timișoara	1999	3
No. 69	**Andreea Mitu**	1991	Bucharest	2006	4
No. 70	Virginia Ruzici	1955	Câmpia Turzii	1975	16
No. 71	**Simona Halep**	1991	Constanța	2006	1
No. 79	**Elena Bogdan**	1992	Craiova	2009	1
No. 101	**Alexandra Cadanțu**	1990	Bucharest	2005	1
N/A	Florența Mihai	1955	Bucharest	1975	1

== See also ==
- Sport in Romania
- Romania Davis Cup team
- Romania Fed Cup team
