= Tennis performance timeline comparison (women) (1978–present) =

Women's tennis performance timeline

This article presents in a tabular form the career tennis Grand Slam, World Hard Court Championships and Olympic singles results of every woman who has reached the singles final of at least one Grand Slam, World Hard Court Championships or won an Olympic medal (OLY) during her career. The Grand Slam tournaments are the Australian Open (AUS), the French Open (FRA), Wimbledon (WIM), and the US Open (USA).

This article is a compilation of the performance timelines that are included in the numerous Wikipedia articles covering individual tennis players, such as Helen Wills Moody, Billie Jean King, Margaret Court, Chris Evert, Martina Navratilova, Steffi Graf, and Serena Williams. This article facilitates the comparison of the career Grand Slam, World Hard Court Championships and Olympic singles results of each player, particularly of women who were playing at the same time.

This article is split into two sections, 1884–1977 and 1977–present, for ease of navigation.

== Key to table entries ==
Key
W	F	SF	QF	#R	RR	Q#	P#	DNQ	A	Z#	PO	G	S	B	NMS	NTI	P	NH

(W) winner; (F) finalist; (SF) semifinalist; (QF) quarterfinalist; (#R) rounds 4, 3, 2, 1; (RR) round-robin stage; (Q#) qualification round; (P#) preliminary round; (DNQ) did not qualify; (A) absent; (Z#) Davis/Fed Cup Zonal Group (with number indication) or (PO) play-off; (G) gold, (S) silver or (B) bronze Olympic/Paralympic medal; (NMS) not a Masters tournament; (NTI) not a Tier I tournament; (P) postponed; (NH) not held; (SR) strike rate (events won / competed); (W–L) win–loss record.
To avoid confusion and double counting, these charts are updated at the conclusion of a tournament or when the player's participation has ended.

The loser in the bronze medal match receives the normal semifinal entry shown above. The rest of the Olympic entries follow the standard key based on their progression through the tournament.

Refer to the notes below each table for an explanation of more tabular entries that are used infrequently in these tables.

== 1978–1984 ==
Winner of most titles: Martina Navratilova, with 11

Player	1978				1979				1980				1981				1982				1983				1984			
Player	FRA	WIM	USA	AUS	FRA	WIM	USA	AUS	FRA	WIM	USA	AUS	FRA	WIM	USA	AUS	FRA	WIM	USA	AUS	FRA	WIM	USA	AUS	FRA	WIM	USA	AUS
(United States) Tracy Austin	A	4R	QF	A	A	SF	W	A	A	SF	SF	A	A	QF	W	QF	QF	QF	QF	A	QF	A	A	A	A	A	A	A
(Australia) Dianne Fromholtz Balestrat	A	4R	3R	A	SF	QF	4R	A	SF	4R	4R	A	3R	3R	1R	1R	A	A	2R	2R	A	1R	1R	Retired				2R
(United Kingdom) Sue Barker	A	4R	A	QF	2R	1R	2R	A	A	2R	A	3R	1R	3R	2R	3R	A	1R	A	1R	A	1R	A	A	1R	2R	1R	A
(United States) Rosemary Casals	A	A	A	A	1R	3R	1R	A	A	2R	1R	1R	2R	1R	4R	1R	A	2R	2R	A	A	3R	3R	A	A	1R	2R	A
(France) Françoise Dürr	A	3R	A	A	1R	2R	1R	A	-	-	-	-	-	-	-	-	-	-	-	-	-	-	-	-	-	-	-	-
(United States) Chris Evert	A	F	W	A	W	F	F	A	W	F	W	A	SF	W	SF	F	SF	F	W	W	W	3R	F	A	F	F	F	W
(United States) Zina Garrison Jackson	-	-	-	-	-	-	-	-	A	A	1R	A	A	A	1R	A	QF	4R	4R	1R	1R	1R	4R	SF	4R	2R	3R	1R
(Australia) Evonne Goolagong Cawley	A	SF	A	A	A	SF	QF	A	A	W	A	2R	A	A	A	QF	A	2R	A	2R	3R	Retired						
(Australia) Helen Gourlay	A	2R	A	A	A	A	A	A	A	A	A	1R	Retired															
(Germany) Steffi Graf	-	-	-	-	-	-	-	-	-	-	-	-	-	-	-	-	-	-	-	-	2R	A	A	1R	3R	4R	1R	3R
(United States) Nancy Richey Gunter	2R	A	1R	A	-	-	-	-	-	-	-	-	-	-	-	-	-	-	-	-	-	-	-	-	-	-	-	-
(West Germany) Sylvia Hanika	1R	2R	1R	A	1R	3R	QF	A	3R	2R	3R	3R	F	1R	QF	A	2R	4R	A	A	3R	3R	QF	QF	3R	1R	QF	2R
(United States) Andrea Jaeger	-	-	-	-	A	A	2R	A	1R	QF	SF	A	SF	4R	2R	QF	F	4R	SF	SF	SF	F	QF	A	1R	A	A	A
(Socialist Federal Republic of Yugoslavia) Mima Jaušovec	F	QF	2R	A	2R	2R	2R	A	3R	A	QF	SF	QF	QF	2R	3R	4R	2R	2R	2R	F	3R	3R	A	3R	1R	3R	A
(United States) Barbara Jordan	A	3R	1R	A	1R	2R	3R	W	1R	3R	2R	A	2R	A	2R	A	1R	2R	1R	A	1R	3R	1R	1R	1R	A	A	A
(United States) Kathy Jordan	A	A	3R	A	A	4R	4R	A	QF	4R	4R	A	3R	4R	4R	3R	A	3R	1R	A	4R	QF	4R	F	2R	SF	2R	A
(United States) Billie Jean Moffitt King	A	QF	A	A	A	QF	SF	A	QF	QF	A	A	A	A	A	A	3R	SF	1R	QF	A	SF	A	2R	Retired			
(Bulgaria) Manuela Maleeva	-	-	-	-	-	-	-	-	-	-	-	-	-	-	-	-	2R	2R	2R	3R	A	3R	2R	3R	A	4R	QF	1R
(Czechoslovakia) Hana Mandlíková	2R	A	3R	A	QF	4R	2R	QF	SF	4R	F	W	W	F	QF	QF	SF	2R	F	2R	QF	4R	QF	2R	SF	SF	QF	A
(West Germany) Helga Niessen Masthoff	QF	A	A	A	-	-	-	-	-	-	-	-	-	-	-	-	-	-	-	-	-	-	-	-	-	-	-	-
(Romania) Florența Mihai	1R	1R	A	A	A	A	2R	A	A	1R	A	A	-	-	-	-	-	-	-	-	-	-	-	-	-	-	-	-
(United States) Betsy Nagelsen	2R	2R	1R	F	A	2R	1R	A	1R	3R	3R	3R	1R	4R	2R	2R	1R	2R	1R	A	1R	3R	1R	2R	1R	2R	1R	1R
(Czechoslovakia) (United States) Martina Navratilova	A	W	SF	A	A	W	SF	A	A	SF	4R	SF	QF	SF	F	W	W	W	QF	F	4R	W	W	W	W	W	W	SF
(Australia) Christine O'Neil	1R	1R	2R	W	1R	2R	2R	A	A	A	A	A	2R	1R	A	A	A	A	A	2R	1R	1R	A	A	-	-	-	-
(Australia) Kerry Melville Reid	A	4R	4R	A	A	4R	QF	A	Retired																			
(Romania) Virginia Ruzici	W	QF	QF	A	QF	4R	A	1R	F	2R	4R	QF	QF	QF	3R	1R	QF	4R	4R	A	3R	4R	1R	A	4R	2R	3R	A
(Argentina) Gabriela Sabatini	-	-	-	-	-	-	-	-	-	-	-	-	-	-	-	-	-	-	-	-	-	-	-	-	A	A	3R	A
(United States) Pam Shriver	A	3R	F	A	A	2R	1R	A	A	4R	QF	QF	A	SF	4R	SF	A	4R	SF	SF	3R	2R	SF	SF	A	QF	QF	QF
(Netherlands) Betty Stöve	A	4R	4R	A	3R	4R	2R	A	2R	3R	1R	3R	1R	2R	1R	2R	2R	A	1R	2R	A	A	Retired					
(Czechoslovakia) Helena Suková	-	-	-	-	-	-	-	-	-	-	-	-	A	A	A	3R	2R	1R	A	1R	4R	A	3R	3R	1R	4R	QF	F
(United States) Karen Hantze Susman	A	A	A	A	A	A	2R	A	A	A	3R	Retired																
(France) Nathalie Tauziat	-	-	-	-	-	-	-	-	-	-	-	-	-	-	-	-	-	-	-	-	-	-	-	-	1R	A	A	A
(Czechoslovakia) Renáta Tomanová	2R	3R	3R	QF	QF	1R	2R	SF	1R	1R	4R	2R	2R	3R	3R	1R	2R	2R	1R	2R	1R	1R	1R	A	A	A	A	A
(Australia) Lesley Turner Bowrey	3R	2R	A	A	-	-	-	-	-	-	-	-	-	-	-	-	-	-	-	-	-	-	-	-	-	-	-	-
(Australia) Wendy Turnbull	A	4R	SF	A	F	QF	3R	A	QF	QF	3R	F	A	QF	3R	SF	A	4R	4R	QF	A	4R	3R	QF	A	4R	SF	SF
(United Kingdom) Virginia Wade	A	SF	3R	A	2R	QF	QF	A	3R	4R	3R	A	4R	2R	3R	A	3R	2R	1R	A	1R	QF	2R	2R	1R	3R	2R	2R
(United States) Sharon Walsh	1R	2R	2R	A	2R	1R	1R	F	A	1R	2R	1R	A	3R	4R	2R	2R	2R	1R	3R	A	2R	1R	3R	A	1R	1R	QF

== 1985–1991 ==
Winner of most titles: Steffi Graf, with 10

Player	1985				1986			1987				1988					1989				1990				1991			
Player	FRA	WIM	USA	AUS	FRA	WIM	USA	AUS	FRA	WIM	USA	AUS	FRA	WIM	USA	OLY	AUS	FRA	WIM	USA	AUS	FRA	WIM	USA	AUS	FRA	WIM	USA
(United States) Tracy Austin	A	A	A	A	A	A	A	A	A	A	A	A	A	A	A	A	A	A	A	A	A	A	A	A	A	A	A	A
(Australia) Dianne Fromholtz Balestrat	1R	2R	1R	3R	A	4R	A	3R	2R	QF	1R	1R	A	2R	2R	1R	A	1R	A	1R	1R	Retired						
(United States) Jennifer Capriati	-	-	-	-	-	-	-	-	-	-	-	-	-	-	-	-	-	-	-	-	A	SF	4R	4R	A	4R	SF	SF
(United States) Rosemary Casals	A	A	2R	A	-	-	-	-	-	-	-	-	-	-	-	-	-	-	-	-	-	-	-	-	-	-	-	-
(United States) Lindsay Davenport	-	-	-	-	-	-	-	-	-	-	-	-	-	-	-	-	-	-	-	-	-	-	-	-	A	A	A	1R
(United States) Chris Evert	W	F	SF	F	W	SF	SF	A	SF	SF	QF	F	3R	SF	SF	3R	A	A	SF	QF	Retired							
(United States) Mary Joe Fernández	1R	A	2R	A	QF	1R	3R	A	2R	4R	3R	A	A	4R	3R	A	3R	SF	4R	1R	F	QF	A	SF	SF	QF	SF	3R
(United States) Zina Garrison Jackson	2R	SF	QF	QF	3R	2R	4R	QF	A	A	4R	2R	4R	QF	SF	B	QF	3R	2R	SF	QF	1R	F	QF	4R	1R	QF	4R
(Germany) Steffi Graf	4R	4R	SF	A	QF	A	SF	A	W	F	F	W	W	W	W	G	W	F	W	W	W	F	SF	F	QF	SF	W	SF
(Germany) Sylvia Hanika	4R	2R	3R	A	1R	1R	2R	4R	4R	4R	4R	4R	4R	3R	3R	3R	1R	4R	1R	3R	A	2R	A	2R	Retired			
(Germany) Anke Huber	-	-	-	-	-	-	-	-	-	-	-	-	-	-	-	-	-	-	-	-	3R	A	2R	1R	QF	3R	4R	2R
(United States) Andrea Jaeger	2R	A	2R	A	-	-	-	-	-	-	-	Retired																
(Socialist Federal Republic of Yugoslavia) Mima Jaušovec	2R	1R	2R	A	3R	1R	A	A	1R	A	A	1R	A	A	A	A	Retired											
(United States) Barbara Jordan	A	1R	1R	A	A	A	A	A	A	A	A	Retired																
(United States) Kathy Jordan	A	2R	4R	A	1R	4R	4R	A	A	1R	1R	A	A	A	A	A	A	A	A	A	A	A	1R	1R	Retired			
(Bulgaria) / (Switzerland) Manuela Maleeva	QF	QF	4R	4R	3R	4R	QF	4R	QF	2R	4R	A	3R	1R	QF	B	A	QF	A	QF	A	QF	1R	QF	2R	2R	A	4R
(Czechoslovakia) Hana Mandlíková	QF	3R	W	SF	SF	F	4R	W	2R	A	4R	QF	2R	3R	A	A	4R	1R	4R	3R	3R	A	2R	Retired				
(Spain) Conchita Martínez	-	-	-	-	-	-	-	-	-	-	-	A	4R	A	1R	A	2R	QF	A	4R	A	QF	A	3R	A	QF	A	QF
(United States) Betsy Nagelsen	1R	1R	1R	2R	1R	4R	2R	2R	A	1R	2R	1R	A	1R	3R	A	A	A	1R	2R	A	1R	3R	A	A	A	1R	A
(United States) Martina Navratilova	F	W	F	W	F	W	W	F	F	W	W	SF	4R	F	QF	A	QF	A	F	F	A	A	W	4R	A	A	QF	F
(Czechoslovakia) Jana Novotná	-	-	-	-	1R	1R	A	A	3R	4R	4R	1R	1R	2R	1R	2R	3R	QF	4R	2R	3R	SF	QF	QF	F	QF	2R	4R
(France) Mary Pierce	-	-	-	-	-	-	-	-	-	-	-	-	-	-	-	-	-	-	-	-	A	2R	A	A	A	3R	A	3R
(Romania) Virginia Ruzici	1R	2R	1R	A	A	A	A	A	2R	A	A	Retired																
(Argentina) Gabriela Sabatini	SF	3R	1R	A	4R	SF	4R	A	SF	QF	QF	A	SF	4R	F	S	SF	4R	2R	SF	3R	4R	SF	W	QF	SF	F	QF
(Socialist Federal Republic of Yugoslavia) Monica Seles	-	-	-	-	-	-	-	-	-	-	-	-	-	-	-	-	A	SF	4R	4R	A	W	QF	3R	W	W	A	W
(United States) Pam Shriver	A	QF	QF	3R	A	1R	QF	QF	A	SF	QF	4R	A	SF	2R	QF	3R	A	3R	1R	3R	A	A	A	3R	A	3R	3R
(Czechoslovakia) Helena Suková	2R	QF	QF	QF	SF	QF	F	4R	4R	QF	SF	4R	QF	QF	4R	2R	F	2R	4R	QF	SF	A	4R	4R	3R	2R	1R	3R
(Spain) Arantxa Sánchez Vicario	-	-	-	-	-	-	-	A	QF	1R	1R	A	QF	1R	4R	1R	A	W	QF	QF	A	2R	1R	SF	SF	F	QF	QF
(France) Nathalie Tauziat	3R	A	A	A	2R	2R	1R	A	4R	2R	2R	A	4R	2R	2R	2R	A	1R	1R	3R	A	4R	4R	4R	A	QF	4R	1R
(Australia) Wendy Turnbull	A	3R	4R	3R	A	1R	QF	4R	A	2R	2R	A	A	1R	1R	2R	1R	A	2R	A	Retired							
(United Kingdom) Virginia Wade	2R	2R	3R	A	Retired																							
(United States) Sharon Walsh	A	1R	1R	1R	A	A	1R	1R	1R	3R	1R	1R	A	1R	A	A	Retired											
(Soviet Union) Natasha Zvereva	-	-	-	-	-	-	-	A	3R	4R	3R	A	F	4R	1R	QF	A	1R	3R	4R	2R	4R	QF	2R	4R	2R	2R	4R

Notes

- In 1986, the Australian Open was not held due to the moving of the date from December to January.

== 1992–1998 ==
Winner of most titles: Steffi Graf, with 11

Player	1992					1993				1994				1995				1996					1997				1998			
Player	AUS	FRA	WIM	OLY	USA	AUS	FRA	WIM	USA	AUS	FRA	WIM	USA	AUS	FRA	WIM	USA	AUS	FRA	WIM	OLY	USA	AUS	FRA	WIM	USA	AUS	FRA	WIM	USA
(United States) Tracy Austin	A	A	A	A	A	A	A	A	A	2R	1R	A	A	Retired																
(United States) Jennifer Capriati	QF	QF	QF	G	3R	QF	QF	QF	1R	A	A	A	A	A	A	A	A	A	1R	A	A	1R	1R	A	A	1R	A	A	2R	1R
(United States) Lindsay Davenport	A	A	A	A	2R	3R	1R	3R	4R	QF	3R	QF	3R	QF	4R	4R	2R	4R	QF	2R	G	4R	4R	4R	2R	SF	SF	SF	QF	W
(Russia) Elena Dementieva	-	-	-	-	-	-	-	-	-	-	-	-	-	-	-	-	-	-	-	-	-	-	-	-	-	-	-	-	-	LQ
(United States) Mary Joe Fernández	F	3R	3R	B	SF	QF	F	3R	A	4R	3R	3R	3R	4R	1R	QF	QF	4R	4R	QF	SF	A	SF	QF	4R	4R	A	A	A	3R
(United States) Zina Garrison Jackson	4R	A	1R	4R	4R	3R	1R	4R	3R	1R	1R	QF	4R	3R	1R	3R	4R	A	A	A	A	1R	Retired							
(Germany) Steffi Graf	A	F	W	S	QF	F	W	W	W	W	SF	1R	F	A	W	W	W	A	W	W	A	W	4R	QF	A	A	A	A	3R	4R
(Switzerland) Martina Hingis	-	-	-	-	-	-	-	-	-	-	-	-	-	2R	3R	1R	4R	QF	3R	4R	2R	SF	W	F	W	W	W	SF	SF	F
(Germany) Anke Huber	QF	2R	3R	QF	1R	4R	SF	4R	3R	3R	4R	2R	2R	4R	4R	4R	4R	F	4R	3R	3R	1R	4R	1R	3R	3R	SF	A	A	1R
(Croatia) Iva Majoli	A	A	A	A	2R	A	4R	A	2R	A	4R	1R	4R	A	QF	1R	1R	QF	QF	A	QF	1R	1R	W	QF	2R	3R	QF	2R	2R
(Switzerland) Manuela Maleeva	QF	3R	3R	QF	SF	4R	3R	2R	SF	QF	Retired																			
(Spain) Conchita Martínez	4R	QF	2R	QF	1R	4R	QF	SF	4R	QF	SF	W	3R	SF	SF	SF	SF	QF	SF	4R	QF	SF	4R	4R	3R	3R	F	4R	3R	4R
(France) Amélie Mauresmo	-	-	-	-	-	-	-	-	-	-	-	-	-	A	1R	A	A	A	2R	A	A	A	A	2R	A	A	3R	1R	2R	3R
(United States) Martina Navratilova	A	A	SF	A	2R	A	A	SF	4R	A	1R	F	A	Retired																
(Czech Republic) Jana Novotná	4R	4R	3R	1R	1R	2R	QF	F	4R	QF	1R	QF	SF	4R	3R	SF	QF	A	SF	QF	B	QF	A	3R	F	QF	A	QF	W	SF
(France) Mary Pierce	A	4R	A	2R	4R	QF	4R	A	4R	4R	F	A	QF	W	4R	2R	3R	2R	3R	QF	2R	A	F	4R	4R	4R	QF	2R	1R	4R
(Argentina) Gabriela Sabatini	SF	SF	SF	A	QF	SF	QF	QF	QF	SF	1R	4R	SF	1R	QF	QF	SF	4R	A	A	3R	3R	Retired							
(Socialist Federal Republic of Yugoslavia) / (Federal Republic of Yugoslavia) / (United States) Monica Seles	W	W	F	A	W	W	A	A	A	A	A	A	A	A	A	A	F	W	QF	2R	QF	F	A	SF	3R	QF	A	F	QF	QF
(United States) Pam Shriver	3R	A	2R	A	2R	1R	A	A	1R	2R	1R	3R	2R	1R	A	1R	2R	1R	A	2R	A	1R	Retired							
(Czech Republic) Helena Suková	3R	A	3R	2R	4R	A	A	QF	F	3R	3R	4R	A	2R	1R	2R	2R	3R	1R	2R	1R	3R	1R	2R	4R	1R	1R	A	1R	A
(Spain) Arantxa Sánchez Vicario	SF	SF	2R	B	F	SF	SF	4R	SF	F	W	4R	W	F	F	F	4R	QF	F	F	S	4R	3R	QF	SF	QF	QF	W	QF	QF
(France) Nathalie Tauziat	A	4R	QF	2R	2R	4R	3R	4R	4R	1R	2R	3R	2R	A	3R	3R	3R	A	2R	3R	1R	2R	A	3R	QF	1R	A	1R	F	4R
(United States) Serena Williams	-	-	-	-	-	-	-	-	-	-	-	-	-	-	-	-	-	-	-	-	-	-	-	-	-	-	2R	4R	3R	3R
(United States) Venus Williams	-	-	-	-	-	-	-	-	-	-	-	-	-	-	-	-	-	-	-	-	-	-	A	2R	1R	F	QF	QF	QF	SF
(Belarus) Natasha Zvereva	2R	QF	QF	3R	3R	3R	4R	QF	QF	1R	4R	1R	A	QF	1R	3R	4R	1R	3R	2R	3R	3R	3R	4R	1R	3R	3R	2R	SF	2R

Notes:

- At the 1992 Olympics, no bronze medal match was played and thus both of the semifinalists received the bronze medal.

== 1999–2005 ==
Winner of most titles: Serena Williams, with 7

Player	1999				2000					2001				2002				2003				2004					2005			
Player	AUS	FRA	WIM	USA	AUS	FRA	WIM	USA	OLY	AUS	FRA	WIM	USA	AUS	FRA	WIM	USA	AUS	FRA	WIM	USA	AUS	FRA	WIM	OLY	USA	AUS	FRA	WIM	USA
(France) Marion Bartoli					A	A	A	A	A	A	1R	A	A	1R	1R	A	3R	1R	2R	1R	1R	2R	1R	3R	A	2R	2R	1R	2R	3R
(United States) Jennifer Capriati	2R	4R	2R	4R	SF	1R	4R	4R	A	W	W	SF	SF	W	SF	QF	QF	1R	4R	QF	SF	A	SF	QF	A	SF	A	A	A	A
(Belgium) Kim Clijsters	A	A	4R	3R	1R	1R	2R	2R	A	4R	F	QF	QF	SF	3R	2R	4R	SF	F	SF	F	F	A	A	A	A	A	4R	4R	W
(United States) Lindsay Davenport	SF	QF	W	SF	W	1R	F	F	2R	SF	A	SF	QF	A	A	A	SF	4R	4R	QF	SF	QF	4R	SF	A	SF	F	QF	F	QF
(Russia) Elena Dementieva	2R	2R	1R	3R	3R	2R	1R	SF	S	3R	2R	3R	4R	4R	4R	4R	2R	1R	1R	4R	4R	1R	F	1R	1R	F	4R	4R	4R	SF
(United States) Mary Joe Fernández	3R	4R	1R	4R	Retired																									
(Germany) Steffi Graf	QF	W	F	Retired																										
(Belgium) Justine Henin	A	2R	A	1R	2R	A	1R	4R	A	4R	SF	F	4R	QF	1R	SF	4R	SF	W	SF	W	W	2R	A	G	4R	A	W	1R	4R
(Switzerland) Martina Hingis	W	F	1R	F	F	SF	QF	SF	A	F	SF	1R	SF	F	A	A	4R	A	Retired											
(Germany) Anke Huber	2R	A	1R	QF	1R	4R	4R	QF	A	A	2R	4R	3R	Retired																
(Serbia and Montenegro) Ana Ivanovic																			A	A	A	A	A	A	A	LQ	3R	QF	3R	2R
(Serbia and Montenegro) Jelena Janković					A	A	A	A	A	A	A	A	A	A	A	A	LQ	2R	LQ	LQ	LQ	2R	1R	1R	1R	2R	2R	1R	3R	3R
(Russia) Svetlana Kuznetsova					A	A	A	A	A	A	A	A	A	2R	LQ	LQ	3R	1R	1R	QF	3R	3R	4R	1R	QF	W	QF	4R	QF	1R
(Croatia) Iva Majoli	A	A	A	1R	A	2R	A	A	1R	3R	1R	1R	3R	2R	2R	3R	3R	1R	2R	1R	1R	Retired								
(Spain) Conchita Martínez	3R	QF	3R	4R	SF	F	2R	3R	2R	2R	3R	QF	A	2R	2R	3R	2R	1R	QF	3R	2R	1R	2R	1R	1R	1R	1R	1R	3R	1R
(France) Amélie Mauresmo	F	2R	A	4R	2R	4R	1R	A	1R	4R	1R	3R	QF	QF	4R	SF	SF	A	QF	A	QF	QF	QF	SF	S	QF	QF	3R	SF	QF
(Russia) Anastasia Myskina	A	A	A	2R	A	1R	3R	1R	2R	A	1R	2R	1R	2R	1R	3R	3R	QF	2R	QF	4R	QF	W	3R	SF	2R	4R	1R	QF	3R
(China) Li Na					A	A	A	LQ	1R	LQ	A	LQ	A	A	A	A	A	A	A	A	A	A	A	A	A	A	3R	A	A	1R
(United States) Martina Navratilova	Retired				A	A	A	A	A	A	A	A	A	A	A	A	A	A	A	A	A	A	1R	2R	A	A	A	A	A	A
(Czech Republic) Jana Novotná	3R	4R	QF	3R	Retired																									
(Italy) Flavia Pennetta																		1R	3R	2R	1R	1R	1R	1R	A	1R	1R	3R	4R	1R
(France) Mary Pierce	QF	2R	4R	QF	4R	W	2R	4R	A	3R	A	A	A	1R	QF	3R	1R	2R	1R	4R	1R	A	3R	1R	QF	4R	1R	F	QF	F
(Czech Republic) Lucie Šafářová																										LQ	LQ	1R	1R	1R
(Russia) Dinara Safina					A	A	A	A	A	A	A	A	A	A	A	LQ	2R	1R	1R	1R	4R	3R	2R	1R	A	1R	2R	1R	3R	1R
(Spain) Arantxa Sánchez Vicario	2R	SF	2R	4R	QF	SF	4R	4R	QF	A	2R	2R	3R	1R	1R	A	1R	Retired												
(Italy) Francesca Schiavone	A	A	A	LQ	A	LQ	LQ	A	3R	1R	QF	2R	1R	3R	3R	2R	4R	1R	2R	3R	QF	2R	4R	2R	QF	4R	3R	4R	1R	3R
(United States) Monica Seles	SF	SF	3R	QF	A	QF	QF	QF	B	QF	A	A	4R	SF	QF	QF	QF	2R	1R	A	A	A	A	A	A	A	A	A	A	A
(Russia) Maria Sharapova										A	A	A	A	A	A	A	A	1R	1R	4R	2R	3R	QF	W	A	3R	SF	QF	SF	SF
(Australia) Samantha Stosur	A	A	A	A	A	A	A	A	A	A	A	A	A	1R	A	A	A	3R	A	1R	A	2R	1R	1R	1R	2R	1R	2R	1R	1R
(France) Nathalie Tauziat	A	2R	QF	3R	2R	3R	1R	QF	A	A	1R	QF	4R	Retired																
(Italy) Roberta Vinci													1R	A	A	1R	A	A	A	A	A	A	1R	A	1R	1R	A	1R	3R	1R
(United States) Serena Williams	3R	3R	A	W	4R	A	SF	QF	A	QF	QF	QF	F	A	W	W	W	W	SF	W	A	A	QF	F	A	QF	W	A	3R	4R
(United States) Venus Williams	QF	4R	QF	SF	A	QF	W	W	G	SF	1R	W	W	QF	F	F	F	F	4R	F	A	3R	QF	2R	3R	4R	4R	3R	W	QF
(Belarus) Natasha Zvereva	3R	2R	2R	2R	2R	4R	2R	A	1R	A	A	A	A	A	A	1R	A	Retired												
(Russia) Vera Zvonareva	A	A	A	A	A	A	A	A	A	A	A	A	A	A	4R	2R	3R	1R	QF	4R	3R	4R	3R	4R	A	4R	2R	3R	2R	A

== 2006–2012 ==
Winner of most titles: Serena Williams, with 8

Player	2006				2007				2008					2009				2010				2011				2012				
Player	AUS	FRA	WIM	USA	AUS	FRA	WIM	USA	AUS	FRA	WIM	OLY	USA	AUS	FRA	WIM	USA	AUS	FRA	WIM	USA	AUS	FRA	WIM	USA	AUS	FRA	WIM	OLY	USA
(Belarus) Victoria Azarenka	1R	1R	1R	3R	3R	1R	3R	4R	3R	4R	3R	3R	3R	4R	QF	QF	3R	QF	1R	3R	2R	4R	QF	SF	3R	W	4R	SF	B	F
(France) Marion Bartoli	2R	2R	2R	3R	2R	4R	F	4R	1R	1R	3R	A	4R	QF	2R	3R	2R	3R	3R	4R	2R	2R	SF	QF	2R	3R	2R	2R	A	QF
(Australia) Ashleigh Barty																									Q1	1R	1R	1R	A	A
(Slovakia) Dominika Cibulková					LQ	3R	LQ	2R	1R	3R	1R	3R	3R	4R	SF	3R	A	1R	3R	3R	QF	3R	1R	QF	2R	2R	QF	1R	1R	3R
(Belgium) Kim Clijsters	SF	SF	SF	A	SF	Retired											W	3R	A	QF	W	W	2R	A	A	SF	A	4R	QF	2R
(United States) Lindsay Davenport	QF	A	A	QF	A	A	A	A	2R	A	2R	A	3R	A	A	A	A	Retired												
(Russia) Elena Dementieva	1R	3R	QF	QF	4R	3R	3R	3R	4R	QF	SF	G	SF	SF	3R	SF	2R	2R	SF	A	4R	Retired								
(Italy) Sara Errani	A	A	LQ	LQ	LQ	LQ	A	2R	1R	1R	1R	2R	2R	3R	1R	2R	3R	3R	1R	3R	3R	1R	2R	2R	1R	QF	F	3R	1R	SF
(Romania) Simona Halep														A	LQ	A	A	LQ	1R	LQ	1R	3R	2R	2R	2R	1R	1R	1R	1R	2R
(Belgium) Justine Henin	F	W	F	F	A	W	SF	W	QF	Retired								F	4R	4R	A	3R	Retired							
(Switzerland) Martina Hingis	QF	QF	3R	2R	QF	A	3R	3R	Suspended									Retired												
(Serbia) Ana Ivanovic	2R	3R	4R	3R	3R	F	SF	4R	F	W	3R	A	2R	3R	4R	4R	1R	2R	2R	1R	4R	1R	1R	3R	4R	4R	3R	4R	3R	QF
(Tunisia) Ons Jabeur																											LQ	A	1R	A
(Serbia) Jelena Janković	2R	3R	4R	SF	4R	SF	4R	QF	SF	SF	4R	QF	F	4R	4R	3R	2R	3R	SF	4R	3R	2R	4R	1R	3R	4R	2R	1R	1R	3R
(Germany) Angelique Kerber					LQ	1R	1R	1R	2R	1R	1R	A	LQ	1R	LQ	LQ	2R	3R	2R	3R	1R	1R	1R	1R	SF	3R	QF	SF	QF	4R
(United States) Madison Keys																					LQ	A	A	A	2R	1R	A	LQ	A	LQ
(Russia) Svetlana Kuznetsova	4R	F	3R	4R	4R	QF	QF	F	3R	SF	4R	1R	3R	QF	W	3R	4R	4R	3R	2R	4R	4R	QF	3R	4R	3R	4R	1R	A	A
(Czech Republic) Petra Kvitová								LQ	LQ	4R	1R	A	1R	1R	A	1R	4R	2R	1R	SF	3R	QF	4R	W	1R	SF	SF	QF	QF	4R
(China) Li Na	1R	3R	QF	4R	4R	3R	A	A	3R	A	2R	SF	4R	A	4R	3R	QF	SF	3R	QF	1R	F	W	2R	1R	4R	4R	2R	1R	3R
(Germany) Sabine Lisicki	A	A	A	A	A	A	A	A	3R	2R	1R	A	2R	2R	1R	QF	2R	2R	A	A	2R	LQ	2R	SF	4R	4R	1R	QF	3R	1R
(France) Amélie Mauresmo	W	4R	W	SF	4R	3R	4R	A	3R	2R	3R	A	4R	3R	1R	4R	2R	Retired												
(Spain) Garbiñe Muguruza																										A	LQ	LQ	A	1R
(Russia) Anastasia Myskina	4R	4R	QF	1R	A	1R	A	A	A	A	A	A	A	A	A	A	A	A	A	A	A	A	Retired							
(Russia) Anastasia Pavlyuchenkova					Q3	A	1R	Q2	Q2	2R	3R	A	2R	1R	3R	2R	1R	2R	3R	3R	4R	3R	QF	2R	QF	2R	3R	2R	A	2R
(Italy) Flavia Pennetta	3R	4R	3R	A	1R	1R	1R	2R	2R	4R	2R	1R	QF	3R	1R	3R	QF	2R	4R	3R	3R	4R	1R	3R	QF	1R	3R	1R	3R	A
(France) Mary Pierce	2R	A	A	3R	A	A	A	A	A	A	A	A	A	A	A	A	A	A	A	A	A	A	A	A	A	A	A	A	A	A
(Poland) Agnieszka Radwańska	A	A	4R	2R	2R	1R	3R	4R	QF	4R	QF	2R	4R	1R	4R	QF	2R	3R	3R	4R	2R	QF	4R	2R	2R	QF	3R	F	1R	4R
(Czech Republic) Lucie Šafářová	1R	1R	A	2R	QF	4R	3R	3R	1R	2R	1R	3R	1R	3R	2R	1R	1R	1R	2R	1R	1R	3R	2R	2R	3R	1R	2R	1R	1R	3R
(Russia) Dinara Safina	2R	QF	3R	QF	3R	4R	2R	4R	1R	F	3R	S	SF	F	F	SF	3R	4R	1R	A	1R	1R	A	A	A	A	A	A	A	A
(Italy) Francesca Schiavone	4R	4R	1R	3R	2R	3R	2R	2R	3R	3R	2R	3R	2R	1R	1R	QF	4R	4R	W	1R	QF	QF	F	3R	4R	2R	3R	4R	2R	1R
(Russia) Maria Sharapova	SF	4R	SF	W	F	SF	4R	3R	W	4R	2R	A	A	A	QF	2R	3R	1R	3R	4R	4R	4R	SF	F	3R	F	W	4R	S	SF
(United States) Sloane Stephens													LQ	A	A	A	LQ	A	A	A	LQ	LQ	1R	LQ	3R	2R	4R	3R	A	3R
(Australia) Samantha Stosur	4R	1R	2R	1R	2R	3R	2R	1R	A	2R	2R	2R	1R	3R	SF	3R	2R	4R	F	1R	QF	3R	3R	1R	W	1R	SF	2R	1R	QF
(Ukraine) Elina Svitolina																						A	Q1	A	A	A	Q2	Q1	A	1R
(Italy) Roberta Vinci	3R	1R	A	1R	1R	1R	2R	1R	1R	A	A	A	2R	1R	1R	3R	1R	3R	2R	2R	1R	1R	3R	3R	3R	2R	1R	4R	1R	QF
(United States) Serena Williams	3R	A	A	4R	W	QF	QF	QF	QF	3R	F	QF	W	W	QF	W	SF	W	QF	W	A	A	A	4R	F	4R	1R	W	G	W
(United States) Venus Williams	1R	QF	3R	A	A	3R	W	SF	QF	3R	W	QF	QF	2R	3R	F	4R	QF	4R	QF	SF	3R	A	4R	2R	A	2R	1R	3R	2R
(Denmark) Caroline Wozniacki	A	A	LQ	A	A	1R	2R	2R	4R	3R	3R	3R	4R	3R	3R	4R	F	4R	QF	4R	SF	SF	3R	4R	SF	QF	3R	1R	QF	1R
(Russia) Vera Zvonareva	1R	1R	1R	3R	4R	A	A	3R	1R	4R	2R	B	2R	SF	A	3R	4R	4R	2R	F	F	SF	4R	3R	QF	3R	A	3R	3R	A

== 2013–2019 ==
Winner of most titles: Serena Williams, with 8

Player	2013				2014				2015				2016					2017				2018				2019			
Player	AUS	FRA	WIM	USA	AUS	FRA	WIM	USA	AUS	FRA	WIM	USA	AUS	FRA	WIM	OLY	USA	AUS	FRA	WIM	USA	AUS	FRA	WIM	USA	AUS	FRA	WIM	USA
(Canada) Bianca Andreescu																			Q1	1R	Q1	Q1	Q3	Q3	Q1	2R	2R	A	W
(Belarus) Victoria Azarenka	W	SF	2R	F	QF	A	2R	QF	4R	3R	QF	QF	QF	1R	A	A	A	A	A	4R	A	A	1R	2R	3R	1R	2R	3R	1R
(France) Marion Bartoli	3R	3R	W	Retired																									
(Australia) Ashleigh Barty	1R	2R	Q1	2R	1R	1R	Q3	1R	A	A	A	A	A	A	A	Q2	A	3R	1R	1R	3R	3R	2R	3R	4R	QF	W	4R	4R
(Switzerland) Belinda Bencic					2R	1R	3R	QF	1R	2R	4R	3R	4R	A	2R	A	3R	1R	A	A	A	2R	2R	4R	1R	3R	3R	3R	SF
(Canada) Eugenie Bouchard	Q2	2R	3R	2R	SF	SF	F	4R	QF	1R	1R	4R	2R	2R	3R	2R	1R	3R	2R	1R	1R	2R	Q1	2R	2R	2R	1R	1R	1R
(United States) Jennifer Brady					A	A	A	Q1	A	A	A	Q1	A	Q3	Q1	A	Q3	4R	1R	2R	4R	1R	2R	2R	1R	Q3	2R	1R	1R
(Slovakia) Dominika Cibulková	2R	2R	3R	1R	F	3R	3R	1R	QF	A	1R	3R	1R	3R	QF	A	3R	3R	2R	3R	2R	1R	1R	QF	4R	1R	1R	A	A
(United States) Danielle Collins					A	A	A	1R	A	A	A	A	A	A	A	A	1R	A	A	Q1	Q1	Q3	1R	1R	1R	SF	2R	3R	2R
(Italy) Sara Errani	1R	SF	1R	2R	1R	QF	1R	QF	3R	QF	2R	3R	1R	1R	2R	3R	1R	2R	2R	1R	A	A	1R	A	A	A	A	A	A
(United States) Coco Gauff																									Q1	A	Q2	4R	3R
(Romania) Simona Halep	1R	1R	2R	4R	QF	F	SF	3R	QF	2R	1R	SF	1R	4R	QF	A	QF	1R	F	QF	1R	F	W	3R	1R	4R	QF	W	2R
(Serbia) Ana Ivanovic	4R	4R	2R	4R	QF	3R	3R	2R	1R	SF	2R	1R	3R	3R	1R	1R	1R	Retired											
(Tunisia) Ons Jabeur	A	A	Q1	Q1	A	Q1	Q3	1R	1R	Q2	A	Q1	A	A	Q1	1R	Q1	Q3	3R	2R	1R	1R	Q2	2R	1R	1R	1R	1R	3R
(Serbia) Jelena Janković	3R	QF	2R	4R	4R	4R	1R	4R	1R	1R	4R	1R	2R	1R	2R	A	2R	3R	1R	1R	1R	A	A	A	A	A	A	A	A
(United States) Sofia Kenin									A	A	A	1R	A	A	A	A	1R	A	A	Q1	3R	1R	1R	2R	3R	2R	4R	2R	3R
(Germany) Angelique Kerber	4R	4R	2R	4R	4R	4R	QF	3R	1R	3R	3R	3R	W	1R	F	S	W	4R	1R	4R	1R	SF	QF	W	3R	4R	1R	2R	1R
(United States) Madison Keys	3R	2R	3R	1R	2R	1R	3R	2R	SF	3R	QF	4R	4R	4R	4R	SF	4R	A	2R	2R	F	QF	SF	3R	SF	4R	QF	2R	4R
(Czech Republic) Barbora Krejčíková					A	A	A	Q3	Q2	Q2	Q1	Q1	Q3	A	Q1	A	A	Q2	A	Q2	Q1	Q3	1R	A	Q1	Q2	Q1	A	Q2
(Russia) Svetlana Kuznetsova	QF	QF	A	3R	1R	QF	1R	1R	1R	2R	2R	1R	2R	4R	4R	3R	2R	4R	4R	QF	2R	A	1R	1R	1R	A	1R	1R	1R
(Czech Republic) Petra Kvitová	2R	3R	QF	3R	1R	3R	W	3R	3R	4R	3R	QF	2R	3R	2R	B	4R	A	2R	2R	QF	1R	3R	1R	3R	F	A	4R	2R
(China) Li Na	F	2R	QF	SF	W	1R	3R	A	Retired																				
(Germany) Sabine Lisicki	1R	3R	F	3R	2R	2R	QF	3R	1R	3R	3R	4R	2R	1R	3R	A	1R	A	A	1R	1R	A	A	Q1	Q1	Q1	A	Q3	A
(Czech Republic) Karolína Muchová													A	A	A	A	Q1	A	A	A	A	A	Q1	Q2	3R	1R	2R	QF	3R
(Spain) Garbiñe Muguruza	2R	2R	2R	A	4R	QF	1R	1R	4R	QF	F	2R	3R	W	2R	3R	2R	QF	4R	W	4R	2R	SF	2R	2R	4R	4R	1R	1R
(Japan) Naomi Osaka					A	A	A	A	A	A	Q1	Q2	3R	3R	A	A	3R	2R	1R	3R	3R	4R	3R	3R	W	W	3R	1R	4R
(Latvia) Jeļena Ostapenko					A	A	A	A	A	Q1	2R	2R	1R	1R	1R	1R	1R	3R	W	QF	3R	3R	1R	SF	3R	1R	1R	1R	3R
(Russia) Anastasia Pavlyuchenkova	1R	2R	1R	3R	3R	2R	1R	2R	1R	1R	2R	2R	1R	3R	QF	3R	2R	QF	2R	1R	1R	2R	2R	1R	1R	QF	1R	1R	2R
(Italy) Flavia Pennetta	A	1R	4R	SF	QF	2R	2R	QF	1R	4R	1R	W	Retired																
(Czech Republic) Karolína Plíšková	1R	1R	2R	1R	2R	2R	2R	3R	3R	2R	2R	1R	3R	3R	2R	A	F	QF	SF	2R	QF	QF	3R	4R	QF	SF	3R	4R	4R
(Puerto Rico) Monica Puig	Q1	3R	4R	1R	2R	1R	1R	2R	2R	1R	1R	1R	3R	3R	1R	G	1R	2R	2R	1R	1R	2R	A	1R	2R	1R	3R	2R	1R
(United Kingdom) Emma Raducanu																								Q1	A	A	A	Q1	A
(Poland) Agnieszka Radwańska	QF	QF	SF	4R	SF	3R	4R	2R	4R	1R	SF	3R	SF	4R	4R	1R	4R	2R	3R	4R	3R	3R	A	2R	1R	Retired			
(Kazakhstan) Elena Rybakina																									Q2	Q1	1R	Q3	1R
(Belarus) Aryna Sabalenka																	Q2	Q2	Q1	2R	Q1	1R	1R	1R	4R	3R	2R	1R	2R
(Czech Republic) Lucie Šafářová	2R	1R	2R	2R	3R	4R	SF	4R	1R	F	4R	1R	A	3R	4R	2R	2R	2R	1R	2R	4R	3R	2R	3R	2R	A	A	Retired	
(Italy) Francesca Schiavone	1R	4R	1R	1R	1R	1R	1R	1R	1R	3R	1R	1R	Q2	1R	2R	A	1R	1R	1R	2R	1R	1R	1R	Retired					
(Russia) Maria Sharapova	SF	F	2R	A	4R	W	4R	4R	F	4R	SF	A	QF	Suspended					A	A	4R	3R	QF	1R	4R	4R	A	1R	1R
(United States) Sloane Stephens	SF	4R	QF	4R	4R	4R	1R	2R	1R	4R	3R	1R	1R	3R	3R	1R	A	A	A	1R	W	1R	F	1R	QF	4R	QF	3R	1R
(Australia) Samantha Stosur	2R	3R	3R	1R	3R	4R	1R	2R	2R	3R	3R	4R	1R	SF	2R	3R	2R	1R	4R	A	A	1R	3R	2R	1R	1R	2R	1R	1R
(Ukraine) Elina Svitolina	1R	2R	1R	2R	3R	2R	1R	1R	3R	QF	2R	3R	2R	4R	2R	QF	3R	3R	QF	4R	4R	QF	3R	1R	4R	QF	3R	SF	SF
(Poland) Iga Świątek																										2R	4R	1R	2R
(Italy) Roberta Vinci	3R	4R	4R	QF	1R	1R	1R	3R	2R	1R	1R	F	3R	1R	3R	1R	QF	1R	1R	1R	1R	A	Retired						
(Czech Republic) Markéta Vondroušová													A	A	A	A	A	A	2R	1R	1R	2R	1R	1R	4R	2R	F	1R	A
(United States) Serena Williams	QF	W	4R	W	4R	2R	3R	W	W	W	W	SF	F	F	W	3R	SF	W	A	A	A	A	4R	F	F	QF	3R	F	F
(United States) Venus Williams	3R	1R	A	2R	1R	2R	3R	3R	QF	1R	4R	QF	1R	4R	SF	1R	4R	F	4R	F	SF	1R	1R	3R	3R	3R	1R	1R	2R
(Denmark) Caroline Wozniacki	4R	2R	2R	3R	3R	1R	4R	F	2R	2R	4R	2R	1R	A	1R	2R	SF	3R	QF	4R	2R	W	4R	2R	2R	3R	1R	3R	3R
(Russia) Vera Zvonareva	A	A	A	A	1R	A	3R	A	2R	A	A	A	A	A	A	A	A	A	A	A	A	A	A	1R	2R	Q1	1R	A	A

== 2020–2026 ==
Winner of most titles: Iga Świątek, with 6

Player	2020				2021					2022				2023				2024					2025				2026			
Player	AUS	WIM	USA	FRA	AUS	FRA	WIM	OLY	USA	AUS	FRA	WIM	USA	AUS	FRA	WIM	USA	AUS	FRA	WIM	OLY	USA	AUS	FRA	WIM	USA	AUS	FRA	WIM	USA
(Canada) Bianca Andreescu	A	NH	A	A	2R	1R	1R	A	4R	A	2R	2R	3R	2R	3R	3R	A	A	3R	3R	2R	1R	A	Q2	Q2	A	A	Q2	1R	Q3
(United States) Amanda Anisimova	1R	NH	3R	3R	A	1R	1R	A	2R	4R	4R	QF	1R	1R	A	A	A	4R	2R	Q3	A	1R	2R	4R	F	F	QF	3R	3R	3R
(Belarus) / Victoria Azarenka	A	NH	F	2R	1R	4R	2R	A	3R	4R	3R	A	4R	SF	1R	4R	2R	4R	2R	A	A	3R	1R	2R	1R	3R	A	A	A	A
(Australia) Ashleigh Barty	SF	NH	A	A	QF	2R	W	1R	3R	W	Retired																			
(Switzerland) Belinda Bencic	3R	NH	A	A	3R	2R	1R	G	QF	2R	3R	1R	3R	4R	1R	4R	4R	A	A	A	A	A	4R	A	SF	2R	2R	4R	4R	1R
(Canada) Eugenie Bouchard	Q3	NH	A	3R	A	A	A	A	A	Q2	A	A	Q2	Q1	A	Q1	Q2	A	A	A	A	A	A	A	A	Retired				
(United States) Jennifer Brady	1R	NH	SF	1R	F	3R	A	1R	A	A	A	A	A	A	A	A	3R	A	A	A	A	A	A	A	A	A	A	A	A	A
(Poland) Maja Chwalińska	Q1	NH	A	A	Q1	Q1	Q1	A	A	A	A	2R	Q2	A	Q2	Q1	A	A	A	A	A	Q1	1R	Q2	Q1	Q2	Q3	F	1R	1R
(Belgium) Kim Clijsters	A	NH	1R	A	A	A	A	A	A	A	Retired																			
(United States) Danielle Collins	2R	NH	1R	QF	2R	3R	2R	A	3R	F	2R	1R	4R	3R	1R	2R	2R	2R	2R	4R	QF	1R	3R	2R	3R	1R	A	A	A	A
(Italy) Sara Errani	Q1	NH	A	2R	3R	Q2	Q1	1R	1R	Q1	Q2	Q1	Q1	Q1	2R	1R	Q1	1R	2R	1R	1R	3R	Q2	Q2	A	A	A	A	A	A
(Canada) Leylah Fernandez	1R	NH	2R	3R	1R	2R	1R	2R	F	1R	QF	A	2R	2R	2R	2R	1R	2R	3R	2R	3R	1R	3R	2R	1R	3R	1R	1R	1R	3R
(United States) Coco Gauff	4R	NH	1R	2R	2R	QF	4R	A	2R	1R	F	3R	QF	4R	QF	1R	W	SF	SF	4R	3R	4R	QF	W	1R	4R	QF	3R	SF	SF
(Romania) Simona Halep	SF	NH	A	4R	QF	A	A	A	4R	4R	2R	SF	1R	Suspended									Retired							
(Tunisia) Ons Jabeur	QF	NH	3R	4R	3R	4R	QF	1R	3R	A	1R	F	F	2R	QF	F	4R	2R	QF	3R	A	A	3R	1R	1R	A	A	A	A	A
(United States) Sofia Kenin	W	NH	4R	F	2R	4R	2R	A	A	1R	A	A	1R	1R	Q1	3R	2R	1R	3R	1R	A	2R	1R	3R	2R	1R	1R	1R	2R	2R
(Germany) Angelique Kerber	4R	NH	4R	1R	1R	1R	SF	A	4R	1R	3R	3R	A	A	A	A	A	1R	1R	1R	QF	Retired								
(United States) Madison Keys	3R	NH	3R	1R	A	3R	4R	A	1R	SF	4R	A	3R	3R	2R	QF	SF	A	3R	4R	A	3R	W	QF	3R	1R	4R	4R	4R	3R
(Czech Republic) Barbora Krejčíková	2R	NH	A	4R	2R	W	4R	3R	QF	QF	1R	3R	2R	4R	1R	2R	1R	QF	1R	W	QF	2R	A	2R	3R	QF	1R	1R	4R	1R
(Russia) Svetlana Kuznetsova	2R	NH	A	1R	2R	1R	1R	A	A	Retired																				
(Czech Republic) Petra Kvitová	QF	NH	4R	SF	2R	2R	1R	2R	3R	1R	2R	3R	4R	2R	1R	4R	2R	A	A	A	A	A	A	1R	1R	1R	A	A	A	A
(Czech Republic) Karolína Muchová	2R	NH	4R	1R	SF	3R	QF	A	1R	A	3R	1R	1R	2R	F	1R	SF	A	A	1R	1R	SF	2R	1R	1R	QF	4R	3R	F	3R
(Spain) Garbiñe Muguruza	F	NH	2R	3R	4R	1R	3R	QF	4R	2R	1R	1R	3R	1R	A	A	A	A	Retired											
(Czech Republic) Linda Noskova												A	1R	A	1R	Q1	2R	1R	2R	QF	2R	2R	1R	1R	4R	3R	3R	1R	W	QF
(Japan) Naomi Osaka	3R	NH	W	A	W	2R	A	3R	3R	3R	1R	A	1R	A	A	A	A	1R	2R	2R	1R	2R	3R	1R	3R	SF	3R	4R	QF	4R
(Latvia) Jeļena Ostapenko	2R	NH	A	3R	1R	1R	3R	1R	A	3R	2R	4R	1R	QF	2R	2R	QF	3R	2R	QF	1R	1R	1R	3R	1R	2R	2R	2R	3R	1R
(Italy) Jasmine Paolini	1R	NH	1R	2R	1R	2R	1R	1R	2R	1R	1R	1R	1R	1R	2R	1R	1R	4R	F	F	3R	4R	3R	4R	2R	3R	3R	4R	QF	3R
(Russia) / Anastasia Pavlyuchenkova	QF	NH	A	2R	1R	F	3R	QF	4R	3R	A	A	A	1R	QF	A	2R	2R	2R	2R	A	3R	QF	1R	QF	2R	1R	A	A	A
(United States) Jessica Pegula	1R	NH	3R	1R	QF	3R	2R	1R	3R	QF	QF	3R	QF	QF	3R	QF	4R	2R	A	2R	2R	F	3R	4R	1R	SF	SF	1R	QF	SF
(Czech Republic) Karolína Plíšková	3R	NH	2R	2R	3R	2R	F	3R	QF	A	2R	2R	QF	QF	1R	1R	2R	1R	1R	1R	A	2R	A	A	A	A	3R	LQ	2R	2R
(Puerto Rico) Monica Puig	A	NH	1R	1R	A	A	A	A	A	A	A	Retired																		
(United Kingdom) Emma Raducanu	A	NH	A	A	A	A	4R	A	W	2R	2R	2R	1R	2R	A	A	A	2R	A	4R	A	1R	3R	2R	3R	3R	2R	1R	A	A
(Kazakhstan) Elena Rybakina	3R	NH	2R	2R	2R	QF	4R	SF	3R	2R	3R	W	1R	F	3R	QF	3R	2R	QF	SF	A	2R	4R	4R	3R	4R	W	2R	3R	W
(Belarus) / Aryna Sabalenka	1R	NH	2R	3R	4R	3R	SF	2R	SF	4R	3R	A	SF	W	SF	SF	F	W	QF	A	A	W	F	F	SF	W	F	QF	4R	F
(Russia) Maria Sharapova	1R	Retired																												
(United States) Sloane Stephens	1R	NH	3R	2R	1R	4R	3R	A	3R	1R	QF	1R	2R	1R	4R	2R	1R	2R	1R	2R	A	1R	1R	A	A	A	1R	1R	A	2R
(Australia) Samantha Stosur	1R	NH	A	A	2R	A	1R	A	1R	2R	Retired																			
(Ukraine) Elina Svitolina	3R	NH	A	QF	4R	3R	2R	B	QF	3R	A	A	A	A	QF	SF	3R	4R	4R	QF	3R	3R	QF	QF	3R	1R	SF	QF	1R	3R
(Poland) Iga Świątek	4R	NH	3R	W	4R	QF	4R	2R	4R	SF	W	3R	W	4R	W	QF	4R	3R	W	3R	B	QF	SF	SF	W	QF	QF	4R	3R	4R
(Croatia) Donna Vekić	3R	NH	3R	1R	4R	1R	2R	3R	1R	1R	2R	1R	1R	QF	2R	3R	1R	1R	3R	SF	S	4R	4R	2R	2R	2R	1R	2R	1R	2R
(Czech Republic) Markéta Vondroušová	1R	NH	2R	1R	4R	4R	2R	S	2R	3R	A	A	A	3R	2R	W	QF	1R	QF	1R	A	A	A	3R	2R	QF	A	Suspended		
(United States) Serena Williams	3R	NH	SF	2R	SF	4R	1R	A	A	A	A	1R	3R	Retired															1R	A
(United States) Venus Williams	1R	NH	1R	1R	2R	1R	2R	A	A	A	A	A	1R	A	A	1R	1R	A	A	A	A	A	A	A	A	1R	1R	A	A	1R
(Denmark) Caroline Wozniacki	3R	NH	Retired														4R	2R	A	3R	2R	4R	Retired							
(China) Zheng Qinwen	A	NH	A	A	A	A	A	A	A	2R	4R	3R	3R	2R	2R	1R	QF	F	3R	1R	G	QF	2R	QF	1R	A	A	1R	1R	QF
(Russia) / Vera Zvonareva	A	NH	1R	Q3	1R	Q3	2R	A	1R	1R	A	A	A	A	A	Q2	1R	A	A	A	A	A	A	A	A	A	A	A	A	A
Player	2020				2021					2022				2023				2024					2025				2026			

== 2027–2033 ==
Player	2027				2028					2029				2030				2031				2032					2033			
Player	AUS	FRA	WIM	USA	AUS	FRA	WIM	OLY	USA	AUS	FRA	WIM	USA	AUS	FRA	WIM	USA	AUS	FRA	WIM	USA	AUS	FRA	WIM	OLY	USA	AUS	FRA	WIM	USA
(Canada) Bianca Andreescu
(United States) Amanda Anisimova
(Belarus) / Victoria Azarenka
(Switzerland) Belinda Bencic
(United States) Jennifer Brady
(Poland) Maja Chwalińska
(United States) Danielle Collins
(Italy) Sara Errani
(Canada) Leylah Fernandez
(United States) Coco Gauff
(Tunisia) Ons Jabeur
(United States) Sofia Kenin
(United States) Madison Keys
(Czech Republic) Barbora Krejčíková
(Czech Republic) Petra Kvitová
(Czech Republic) Karolína Muchová
(Czech Republic) Linda Noskova
(Japan) Naomi Osaka
(Latvia) Jeļena Ostapenko
(Italy) Jasmine Paolini
(Russia) / Anastasia Pavlyuchenkova
(United States) Jessica Pegula
(Czech Republic) Karolína Plíšková
(United Kingdom) Emma Raducanu
(Kazakhstan) Elena Rybakina
(Belarus) / Aryna Sabalenka
(United States) Sloane Stephens
(Ukraine) Elina Svitolina
(Poland) Iga Świątek
(Croatia) Donna Vekić
(Czech Republic) Markéta Vondroušová	Suspended																													
(United States) Serena Williams
(United States) Venus Williams
(China) Zheng Qinwen
	AUS	FRA	WIM	USA	AUS	FRA	WIM	OLY	USA	AUS	FRA	WIM	USA	AUS	FRA	WIM	USA	AUS	FRA	WIM	USA	AUS	FRA	WIM	OLY	USA	AUS	FRA	WIM	USA
Player	2027				2028					2029				2030				2031				2032					2033			

== See also ==
- Tennis performance timeline comparison (men)
