= List of France Fed Cup team representatives =

This is a list of tennis players who have represented the France Fed Cup team in an official Fed Cup match. France have taken part in the competition since 1963.

== Players ==
Player	W-L (Total)	W-L (Singles)	W-L (Doubles)	Ties	Debut
Sophie Amiach	1 – 1	-	1 – 1	2	1981
Marion Bartoli	3 – 1	2 – 0	1 – 1	3	2004
Séverine Beltrame	2 – 3	0 – 1	2 – 2	5	2005
Marie-Christine Calleja	1 – 2	1 – 2	-	3	1984
Gail Chanfreau	27 – 26	14 – 16	13 – 10	35	1969
Stéphanie Cohen-Aloro	1 – 3	1 – 0	0 – 3	4	2003
Julie Coin	1 – 2	0 – 1	1 – 1	3	2010
Alizé Cornet	7 – 18	3 – 14	4 – 4	17	2008
Rosie Reyes	8 – 7	2 – 2	6 – 5	11	1968
Odile de Roubin	8 – 7	7 – 3	1 – 4	11	1970
Nathalie Dechy	17 – 15	13 – 7	4 – 8	18	2000
Isabelle Demongeot	12 – 8	3 – 3	9 – 5	16	1985
Emmanuelle Derly	1 – 0	1 – 0	-	1	1985
Françoise Dürr	31 – 17	16 – 8	15 – 9	27	1963
Stéphanie Foretz	2 – 1	1 – 0	1 – 1	2	2002
Nathalie Fuchs	7 – 5	7 – 4	0 – 1	11	1973
Alexandra Fusai	6 – 2	1 – 1	5 – 1	6	1994
Caroline Garcia	13 – 5	8 – 4	5 – 1	7	2013
Tatiana Golovin	8 – 4	7 – 3	1 – 1	6	2004
Florence Guédy	4 – 3	2 – 0	2 – 3	6	1973
Julie Halard-Decugis	22 – 13	13 – 10	9 – 3	19	1990
Amandine Hesse	3 – 1	-	3 – 1	4	2017
Maïder Laval	0 – 1	-	0 – 1	1	1988
Émilie Loit	4 – 7	2 – 1	2 – 6	10	2002
Amélie Mauresmo	32 – 11	30 – 9	2 – 2	21	1998
Kristina Mladenovic	20 – 9	9 – 7	11 – 2	14	2012
Pascale Paradis	4 – 1	0 – 1	4 – 0	5	1985
Pauline Parmentier	6 – 12	5 – 12	1 – 0	11	2010
Mary Pierce	18 – 14	16 – 10	2 – 4	22	1990
Sarah Pitkowski-Malcor	1 – 1	1 – 1	-	1	1998
Karine Quentrec	1 – 1	1 – 1	-	2	1988
Virginie Razzano	16 – 9	10 – 5	6 – 4	15	2001
Jacqueline Rees-Lewis	1 – 2	1 – 2	-	3	1964
Aravane Rezaï	2 – 2	2 – 2	-	2	2010
Monique Salfati	1 – 2	1 – 2	-	3	1967
Anne-Gaëlle Sidot	1 – 0	-	1 – 0	1	1997
Brigitte Simon-Glinel	11 – 4	9 – 3	2 – 1	14	1977
Christiane Spinoza	2 – 2	0 – 1	2 – 1	3	1970
Catherine Suire	5 – 4	0 – 1	5 – 3	8	1983
Catherine Tanvier	10 – 7	6 – 4	4 – 3	11	1981
Nathalie Tauziat	33 – 21	13 – 12	20 – 9	40	1985
Évelyne Terras	0 – 2	0 – 1	0 – 1	2	1966
Sandrine Testud	9 – 5	8 – 5	1 – 0	10	1997
Frédérique Thibault	9 – 11	2 – 7	7 – 4	16	1977
Corinne Vanier	8 – 7	4 – 5	4 – 2	9	1981
