= Brigitte Simon-Glinel =

French former tennis player (born 1956)

Brigitte Simon
- Full name: Brigitte Simon-Glinel
- Country (sports): France
- Born: 1 November 1956 (age 69) Caen, France
- Height: 1.63 m (5 ft 4 in)
- Plays: Right-handed

Singles
- Career record

Grand Slam singles results
- Australian Open: 2R (1976)
- French Open: SF (1978)
- Wimbledon: 2R (1980)
- US Open: Q1 (1979)

Doubles
- Career record

Grand Slam doubles results
- Australian Open: QF (1976)
- French Open: 2R (1978)
- Wimbledon: 2R (1975, 1977)

Brigitte Simon-Glinel (born 1 November 1956) is a French former professional tennis player. She competed under her maiden name Brigitte Simon.

Simon, a semi-finalist at the 1978 French Open, represented France in 14 Federation Cup ties. She played in two Federation Cup quarter-final ties with France and both times came up against Chris Evert, for two losses.

A three-time winner of the national championships, Simon was the French number one between 1978 and 1981.

== See also ==
- List of France Fed Cup team representatives
