= 1978 French Open – Women's doubles =

Women's doubles
- 1978 French Open

Final
- Champion: (Socialist Federal Republic of Yugoslavia) Mima Jaušovec (Romania) Virginia Ruzici
- Runner-up: (Australia) Lesley Bowrey (France) Gail Benedetti
- Score: 5–7, 6–4, 8–6

Events
Singles	men	women		boys	girls
Doubles	men	women	mixed	boys	girls
WC Singles	men	women	quad
WC Doubles	men	women	quad
Legends	−45	45+	women
← 1977 ·	French Open	· 1979 →

Regina Maršíková and Pam Teeguarden were the defending champions but competed this year with different partners. Maršíková teamed up with Helena Anliot, and lost in the semifinals to Lesley Bowrey and Gail Benedetti. Teeguarden teamed up with Marjorie Blackwood, and lost in the second round to Daniela Marzano and Paula Smith.

Mima Jaušovec and Virginia Ruzici won in the final 5–7, 6–4, 8–6 against Lesley Bowrey and Gail Benedetti.

== Draw ==
=== Key ===
- Q = Qualifier
- WC = Wild card
- LL = Lucky loser
- Alt = Alternate
- SE = Special exempt
- PR = Protected ranking
- ITF = ITF entry
- JE = Junior exempt
- w/o = Walkover
- r = Retired
- d = Defaulted
- SR = Special ranking

=== Finals ===
Semifinals
(Socialist Federal Republic of Yugoslavia) Mima Jaušovec (Romania) Virginia Ruzici	6	6
(Italy) Daniela Marzano (United States) Paula Smith	4	3
(Sweden) Helena Anliot (Czechoslovakia) Regina Maršíková	6	7	3
(Australia) Lesley Bowrey (France) Gail Benedetti	7	6	6

Final
(Socialist Federal Republic of Yugoslavia) Mima Jaušovec (Romania) Virginia Ruzici	5	6	8
(Australia) Lesley Bowrey (France) Gail Benedetti	7	4	6

=== Top half ===
First round
(Socialist Federal Republic of Yugoslavia) M Jaušovec (Romania) V Ruzici	6	6
(France) D Beillan (Uruguay) F Bonicelli	3	3
(United States) D Ganz (United States) N Weigel	6	6	6
(West Germany) H Eisterlehner (West Germany) I Riedel	4	7	4
(United Kingdom) G Coles (United States) K Latham	6	2	2
(Argentina) V González (Argentina) I Madruga	4	6	6
(United States) L Forood (Argentina) R Giscafré	6	6
(United States) J Stratton (Sweden) M Wikstedt	4	4
(Romania) F Mihai (United States) B Nagelsen	7	6
(Italy) S Simmonds (Czechoslovakia) H Strachoňová	5	3
(United States) M Louie (Australia) A Tobin	4	7	4
(France) S Rual (France) B Simon	6	6	6
(Italy) D Marzano (United States) P Smith	6	6
(France) N Fuchs (France) F Thibault	2	1
(Canada) M Blackwood (United States) P Teeguarden	6	6	6
(Australia) L Hunt (Romania) M Simionescu	4	7	2

Second round
(Socialist Federal Republic of Yugoslavia) M Jaušovec (Romania) V Ruzici	6	6
(United States) D Ganz (United States) N Weigel	1	1
(Argentina) V González (Argentina) I Madruga	6	6
(United States) L Forood (Argentina) R Giscafré	3	3
(Romania) F Mihai (United States) B Nagelsen	6	6
(France) S Rual (France) B Simon	0	1
(Italy) D Marzano (United States) P Smith	6	6
(Canada) M Blackwood (United States) P Teeguarden	4	4

Quarterfinals
(Socialist Federal Republic of Yugoslavia) M Jaušovec (Romania) V Ruzici	7	6
(Argentina) V González (Argentina) I Madruga	6	2
(Romania) F Mihai (United States) B Nagelsen	6	0	4
(Italy) D Marzano (United States) P Smith	4	6	6

Semifinals
(Socialist Federal Republic of Yugoslavia) M Jaušovec (Romania) V Ruzici	6	6
(Italy) D Marzano (United States) P Smith	4	3

=== Bottom half ===
First round
(West Germany) K Ebbinghaus (West Germany) H Masthoff	2	2
(Australia) C O'Neil (Australia) P Whytcross	6	6
(Australia) N Gregory (Czechoslovakia) R Tomanová	w/o
(France) P du Puy (United States) C-A Thomas
(United States) D Desfor (United States) G Galt	5	4
(Czechoslovakia) I Budařová (Czechoslovakia) H Mandlíková	7	6
(United States) N Ornstein (United States) C Stoll	6	4	4
(Sweden) H Anliot (Czechoslovakia) R Maršíková	4	6	6
(United States) P Bostrom (Australia) K Ruddell	5	6	8
(Australia) C Doerner (United States) R Gerulaitis	7	1	6
(United States) R Harris (Hungary) B Klein	6	6
(Brazil) P Medrado (Denmark) H Viragh	3	4
(Australia) D Evers (Hungary) M Pinterová	6	6
(United States) J Evert (Italy) A-M Nasuelli	2	4
(Australia) L Bowrey (France) G Benedetti	6	6
(United States) L duPont (United States) K May	3	4

Second round
(Australia) C O'Neil (Australia) P Whytcross	6	6
(Australia) N Gregory (Czechoslovakia) R Tomanová	2	2
(Czechoslovakia) I Budařová (Czechoslovakia) H Mandlíková	4	1
(Sweden) H Anliot (Czechoslovakia) R Maršíková	6	6
(United States) P Bostrom (Australia) K Ruddell	6	6
(United States) R Harris (Hungary) B Klein	0	4
(Australia) D Evers (Hungary) M Pinterová	0	0
(Australia) L Bowrey (France) G Benedetti	6	6

Quarterfinals
(Australia) C O'Neil (Australia) P Whytcross	1	3
(Sweden) H Anliot (Czechoslovakia) R Maršíková	6	6
(United States) P Bostrom (Australia) K Ruddell	2	3
(Australia) L Bowrey (France) G Benedetti	6	6

Semifinals
(Sweden) H Anliot (Czechoslovakia) R Maršíková	6	7	3
(Australia) L Bowrey (France) G Benedetti	7	6	6
