= Antonio Hartmann =

Chilean tennis player

- Full name: Antonio Hartmann Baeza
- Country (sports): Chile
- Height: 5 ft 10 in (178 cm)

Singles
- Career record: 0-1
- Highest ranking: No. 510 (1981.01.04)

Grand Slam singles results
- Wimbledon: Q1 (1978)

Doubles
- Career record: 0-2
- Highest ranking: No. 272 (1979.01.03)

Grand Slam doubles results
- French Open: 1R (1978)

Antonio Hartmann Baeza is a Chilean former professional tennis player.

Hartmann is one of three brothers and is of Hungarian descent through his father, an immigrant to Chile.

Active in the 1970s and 1980s, Hartmann played collegiate tennis in the United States for Pan American University, after which he competed on the professional tour, making appearances at Wimbledon and the French Open.
