= 1978 French Open – Men's singles =

Men's singles
- 1978 French Open

Final
- Champion: (Sweden) Björn Borg
- Runner-up: (Argentina) Guillermo Vilas
- Score: 6–1, 6–1, 6–3

Details
- Draw: 128
- Seeds: 16

Events
Singles	men	women		boys	girls
Doubles	men	women	mixed	boys	girls
WC Singles	men	women	quad
WC Doubles	men	women	quad
Legends	−45	45+	women
- French Open

Björn Borg defeated defending champion Guillermo Vilas in the final, 6–1, 6–1, 6–3 to win the men's singles tennis title at the 1978 French Open. It was his third French Open title and fifth major title overall. Borg did not lose a set during the tournament, and dropped only 32 games in total, an Open Era record in men's singles.

This tournament marked the first major appearance of future world No. 1 and eight-time major champion Ivan Lendl.

== Seeds ==
The seeded players are listed below. Björn Borg is the champion; others show the round in which they were eliminated.

1. (Sweden) Björn Borg (champion)
2. (Argentina) Guillermo Vilas (final)
3. (United States) Brian Gottfried (third round)
4. (United States) Eddie Dibbs (quarterfinals)
5. (Spain) Manuel Orantes (quarterfinals)
6. (Mexico) Raúl Ramírez (quarterfinals)
7. (Italy) Corrado Barazzutti (semifinals)
8. (United States) Harold Solomon (third round)
9. (United States) Roscoe Tanner (fourth round)
10. (United States) Dick Stockton (semifinals)
11. (Poland) Wojtek Fibak (fourth round)
12. (Australia) Phil Dent (first round)
13. (United States) Tim Gullikson (fourth round)
14. (United Kingdom) Buster C. Mottram (third round)
15. (Australia) John Alexander (fourth round)
16. (United States) Stan Smith (third round)

== Draw ==
=== Key ===
- Q = Qualifier
- WC = Wild card
- LL = Lucky loser
- r = Retired

=== Finals ===
Quarterfinals
1	(Sweden) Björn Borg	6	6	6
6	(Mexico) Raúl Ramírez	3	3	0
4	(United States) Eddie Dibbs	2	6^{9}	1
7	(Italy) Corrado Barazzutti	6	7^{11}	6
5	(Spain) Manuel Orantes	5	1	3
10	(United States) Dick Stockton	7	6	6
(Chile) Hans Gildemeister	4	6	1	6	3
2	(Argentina) Guillermo Vilas	6	2	6	3	6

Semifinals
1	(Sweden) Björn Borg	6	6	6
7	(Italy) Corrado Barazzutti	0	1	0
10	(United States) Dick Stockton	3	3	2
2	(Argentina) Guillermo Vilas	6	6	6

Final
1	(Sweden) Björn Borg	6	6	6
2	(Argentina) Guillermo Vilas	1	1	3

=== Top half ===
==== Section 1 ====
First round
1	(Sweden) B Borg	6	6	6
(France) É Deblicker	1	1	1
(United States) R Fagel	6	7	6
(Australia) P Kronk	1	6	1
(United States) G Hardie	5	6	6	7	6
(Spain) J Moreno	7	1	7	6	1
(Sweden) B Andersson	4	6	3	6	4
(Italy) P Bertolucci	6	3	6	0	6
(United States) N Saviano	3	2	6
(Switzerland) H Günthardt	6	6	7
(West Germany) K Meiler	4	3	6	1
(Australia) C Dibley	6	6	2	6
(France) J-L Haillet	3	2	4
(France) P Portes	6	6	6
(West Germany) J Fassbender	2	1	r
9	(United States) R Tanner	6	4

Second round
1	(Sweden) B Borg	6	6	6
(United States) R Fagel	0	1	0
(United States) G Hardie	2	3	5
(Italy) P Bertolucci	6	6	7
(Switzerland) H Günthardt	3	3	6
(Australia) C Dibley	6	6	7
(France) P Portes	3	0	1
9	(United States) R Tanner	6	6	6

Third round
1	(Sweden) B Borg	6	6	6
(Italy) P Bertolucci	0	2	2
(Australia) C Dibley	5	6	4
9	(United States) R Tanner	7	7	6

Fourth round
1	(Sweden) B Borg	6	6	7^{7}
9	(United States) R Tanner	2	4	6^{5}

==== Section 2 ====
First round
14	(United Kingdom) B Mottram	6	6	6
(Spain) J Soler	2	3	2
(France) C Roger-Vasselin	7	7	6
(United States) S Krulevitz	5	6	0
(South Africa) B Hewitt	5	5	4
(Colombia) I Molina	7	7	6
(Paraguay) V Pecci Sr.	6	7	6
(Australia) B Lloyd	4	5	1
(Spain) J Higueras	6	6	6
(France) D Bedel	0	2	3
(Chile) P Cornejo	5	4	6	3
(United States) B Teacher	7	6	3	6
(United States) P Pearson	2	6	4
(Italy) A Zugarelli	6	7	6
(France) B Fritz	2	0	4
6	(Mexico) R Ramírez	6	6	6

Second round
14	(United Kingdom) B Mottram	2	7	6	6
(France) C Roger-Vasselin	6	5	2	1
(Colombia) I Molina	2	3	4
(Paraguay) V Pecci Sr.	6	6	6
(Spain) J Higueras	2	4	3
(United States) B Teacher	6	6	6
(Italy) A Zugarelli	1	3	2
6	(Mexico) R Ramírez	6	6	6

Third round
14	(United Kingdom) B Mottram	3	0	0
(Paraguay) V Pecci Sr.	6	6	6
(United States) B Teacher	2	4	4
6	(Mexico) R Ramírez	6	6	6

Fourth round
(Paraguay) V Pecci Sr.	2	2	6^{7}
6	(Mexico) R Ramírez	6	6	7^{9}

==== Section 3 ====
First round
4	(United States) E Dibbs	6	6	6
(Spain) A Muñoz	1	3	1
(Australia) B Giltinan	6	6	7
(United States) C Richey	2	2	5
Q	(West Germany) W Zirngibl	3	3	6
(Australia) T Rocavert	6	6	7
(Australia) P McNamee	6	6	4	7
(Austria) H Kary	3	2	6	5
(United States) P DuPré	0	5	3
(United Kingdom) J Lloyd	6	7	6
(United States) G Mayer	6	3	3	6	2r
(West Germany) U Pinner	4	6	6	4	3
Q	(Japan) K Tanabe	2	4	3
(United States) V Winitsky	6	6	6
(Egypt) I El Shafei	4	6	4	4
11	(Poland) W Fibak	6	2	6	6

Second round
4	(United States) E Dibbs	7	6	6
(Australia) B Giltinan	6	1	3
(Australia) T Rocavert	2	3	3
(Australia) P McNamee	6	6	6
(United Kingdom) J Lloyd	2	0	6	6	6
(West Germany) U Pinner	6	6	1	4	3
(United States) V Winitsky	1	2	3
11	(Poland) W Fibak	6	6	6

Third round
4	(United States) E Dibbs	7	6	3	6
(Australia) P McNamee	6	1	6	1
(United Kingdom) J Lloyd	1	6	1	1
11	(Poland) W Fibak	6	4	6	6

Fourth round
4	(United States) E Dibbs	6	7	6
11	(Poland) W Fibak	3	5	1

==== Section 4 ====
First round
16	(United States) S Smith	3	6	6	7
(Australia) J James	6	3	3	5
(Switzerland) C Dowdeswell	6	5	6	1	6
(United States) T Gullikson	3	7	3	6	3
(Australia) M Edmondson	6	4	3	2
LL	(Czechoslovakia) S Birner	2	6	6	6
(United States) E van Dillen	2	5	1
(Socialist Federal Republic of Yugoslavia) Z Franulović	6	7	6
(Australia) K Warwick	1	6	7	6	3
(France) P Dominguez	6	7	6	3	6
(United States) R Fisher	3	5	3
(United States) H Pfister	6	7	6
(Italy) G Ocleppo	6	6	6
Q	(India) S Menon	3	2	4
(South Africa) J Yuill	6	6	3	1	r
7	(Italy) C Barazzutti	3	7	6	0

Second round
16	(United States) S Smith	7	3	5	7	6
(Switzerland) C Dowdeswell	6	6	7	6	4
LL	(Czechoslovakia) S Birner	7	7	6
(Socialist Federal Republic of Yugoslavia) Z Franulović	6	5	2
(France) P Dominguez	7	5	7	6
(United States) H Pfister	6	7	5	2
(Italy) G Ocleppo	6	2	3	3
7	(Italy) C Barazzutti	4	6	6	6

Third round
16	(United States) S Smith	6	2	4
LL	(Czechoslovakia) S Birner	7	6	6
(France) P Dominguez	7	4	5	2
7	(Italy) C Barazzutti	5	6	7	6

Fourth round
LL	(Czechoslovakia) S Birner	1	4	1
7	(Italy) C Barazzutti	6	6	6

=== Bottom half ===
==== Section 5 ====
First round
5	(Spain) M Orantes	3	6	6	6
(Netherlands) T Okker	6	3	2	2
(Chile) A Pierola	6	2	0	6	6
(South Africa) B Mitton	3	6	6	3	0
(United Kingdom) R Lewis	3	5	3
(Ecuador) R Ycaza	6	7	6
(Czechoslovakia) T Šmid	7	4
(United States) V Amaya	6	6	r
(France) C Freyss	5	4	0
(United States) J Borowiak	7	6	6
(Czechoslovakia) J Granát	6	2	3	1
(Italy) A Panatta	3	6	6	6
(France) G Goven	4	7	7	6
(Czechoslovakia) V Zednik	6	5	5	2
(Australia) C Letcher	3	2	2
13	(United States) T Gullikson	6	6	6

Second round
5	(Spain) M Orantes	7	6	7
(Chile) A Pierola	5	1	6
(Ecuador) R Ycaza	2	7	2	1
(Czechoslovakia) T Šmid	6	5	6	6
(United States) J Borowiak	5	6	6	6
(Italy) A Panatta	7	1	4	4
(France) G Goven	6	3	3	3
13	(United States) T Gullikson	2	6	6	6

Third round
5	(Spain) M Orantes	7	7	6
(Czechoslovakia) T Šmid	5	5	2
(United States) J Borowiak	2	6	2
13	(United States) T Gullikson	6	7	6

Fourth round
5	(Spain) M Orantes	6	7^{7}	7^{7}
13	(United States) T Gullikson	3	6^{4}	6^{3}

==== Section 6 ====
First round
10	(United States) D Stockton	4	2	6	6	6
(United Kingdom) R Drysdale	6	6	3	4	1
(Australia) D Crealy	3	1	6	3
Q	(Australia) J Marks	6	6	4	6
(New Zealand) C Lewis	6	6	6
(Australia) R Frawley	4	2	3
Q	(France) D Naegelen	0	3	0
(Hungary) B Taróczy	6	6	6
(Brazil) C Kirmayr	2	4	4
(United States) T Moor	6	6	6
Q	(West Germany) R Gehring	6	4	2	6	6
(United States) M Fishbach	3	6	6	0	3
Q	(Australia) D Carter	6	6	6
(Australia) B Phillips-Moore	1	2	1
(United States) B Scanlon	2	2	0
3	(United States) B Gottfried	6	6	6

Second round
10	(United States) D Stockton	6	6	7
Q	(Australia) J Marks	1	0	5
(New Zealand) C Lewis	1	1	1
(Hungary) B Taróczy	6	6	6
(United States) T Moor	6	6	6	5	3
Q	(West Germany) R Gehring	4	3	7	7	6
Q	(Australia) D Carter	4	2	6	4
3	(United States) B Gottfried	6	6	3	6

Third round
10	(United States) D Stockton	4	6	3	7	6
(Hungary) B Taróczy	6	4	6	6	4
Q	(West Germany) R Gehring	6	6	4	6	6
3	(United States) B Gottfried	3	7	6	3	2

Fourth round
10	(United States) D Stockton	7	6	6
Q	(West Germany) R Gehring	5	1	3

==== Section 7 ====
First round
8	(United States) H Solomon	6	7	6
(United Kingdom) J Feaver	2	5	2
(Chile) B Prajoux	7	6	4	6	6
(Netherlands) L Sanders	5	7	6	1	2
Q	(Czechoslovakia) P Složil	6	4	6	2
(Argentina) L Álvarez	7	6	3	6
(Chile) H Gildemeister	6	6	6
(France) J Vanier	1	3	4
(France) P Proisy	6	6	7
(South Africa) B Bertram	3	3	5
(Argentina) R Cano	3	6	6	7
(Socialist Federal Republic of Yugoslavia) N Špear	6	4	3	5
Q	(West Germany) K Eberhard	6	2	7	6
(West Germany) P Elter	4	6	6	2
(France) J-F Caujolle	1	4	3
15	(Australia) J Alexander	6	6	6

Second round
8	(United States) H Solomon	7	6	6	6
(Chile) B Prajoux	6	3	7	3
(Argentina) L Álvarez	6	6	4	3
(Chile) H Gildemeister	4	7	6	6
(France) P Proisy	1	7	2	6	0
(Argentina) R Cano	6	5	6	4	6
Q	(West Germany) K Eberhard	6	4	7	2
15	(Australia) J Alexander	7	6	6	6

Third round
8	(United States) H Solomon	6	5	0	4
(Chile) H Gildemeister	3	7	6	6
(Argentina) R Cano	6	2	3
15	(Australia) J Alexander	7	6	6

Fourth round
(Chile) H Gildemeister	7	6	3	4	6
15	(Australia) J Alexander	5	4	6	6	3

==== Section 8 ====
First round
12	(Australia) P Dent	4	1	2
(United States) A Ashe	6	6	6
Q	(Argentina) J L Clerc	6	6	6
(Czechoslovakia) I Lendl	3	0	3
(Czechoslovakia) J Kodeš	6	6	6
(New Zealand) B Fairlie	2	0	1
(France) H Gauvain	1	6	3	2
(Socialist Federal Republic of Yugoslavia) N Pilić	6	3	6	6
(France) F Jauffret	7	3	3	4
(France) G Moretton	6	6	6	6
(France) Y Noah	6	6	6
Q	(Chile) A Fillol	2	2	3
(Czechoslovakia) P Hutka	6	0	1
(United States) B Martin	7	6	6
(New Zealand) O Parun	0	4	0
2	(Argentina) G Vilas	6	6	6

Second round
(United States) A Ashe	6	6	6
Q	(Argentina) J L Clerc	2	4	4
(Czechoslovakia) J Kodeš	3	6	7	7
(Socialist Federal Republic of Yugoslavia) N Pilić	6	3	5	6
(France) G Moretton	0	3	2
(France) Y Noah	6	6	6
(United States) B Martin	2	6	6	2	4
2	(Argentina) G Vilas	6	2	3	6	6

Third round
(United States) A Ashe	4	6	7	6
(Czechoslovakia) J Kodeš	6	3	6	4
(France) Y Noah	2	6	1	1
2	(Argentina) G Vilas	6	4	6	6

Fourth round
(United States) A Ashe	2	2	2
2	(Argentina) G Vilas	6	6	6

Preceded by 1977 Australian Open (December)	Grand Slam men's singles	Succeeded by 1978 Wimbledon Championships
