= 1978 French Open =

- Date: 29 May – 11 June 1978
- Edition: 77
- Category: 48th Grand Slam (ITF)
- Prize money: $337,000
- Surface: Clay / outdoor
- Location: Paris (XVI^{e}), France
- Venue: Stade Roland Garros

Champions

Men's singles
- (Sweden) Björn Borg

Women's singles
- (Romania) Virginia Ruzici

Men's doubles
- (United States) Gene Mayer / (United States) Hank Pfister

Women's doubles
- (Socialist Federal Republic of Yugoslavia) Mima Jaušovec / (Romania) Virginia Ruzici

Mixed doubles
- (Czechoslovakia) Renáta Tomanová / (Czechoslovakia) Pavel Složil
← 1977 ·	French Open	· 1979 →

The 1978 French Open was a tennis tournament that took place on the outdoor clay courts at the Stade Roland Garros in Paris, France. The tournament ran from 29 May until 11 June. It was the 77th staging of the French Open, and the first Grand Slam tennis event of 1978.

== Finals ==
=== Men's singles ===
(Sweden) Björn Borg defeated (Argentina) Guillermo Vilas, 6–1, 6–1, 6–3

- It was Borg's 5th career Grand Slam title, and his 3rd French Open title.

=== Women's singles ===
(Romania) Virginia Ruzici defeated (Socialist Federal Republic of Yugoslavia) Mima Jaušovec, 6–2, 6–2

- It was Ruzici's 1st (and only) career Grand Slam title.

=== Men's doubles ===
(United States) Gene Mayer / (United States) Hank Pfister defeated (Spain) José Higueras / (Spain) Manuel Orantes, 6–3, 6–2, 6–2

=== Women's doubles ===
(Socialist Federal Republic of Yugoslavia) Mima Jaušovec / (Romania) Virginia Ruzici defeated (Australia) Lesley Turner Bowrey / (France) Gail Sherriff Lovera, 5–7, 6–4, 8–6

=== Mixed doubles ===
(Czechoslovakia) Renáta Tomanová / (Czechoslovakia) Pavel Složil defeated (Romania) Virginia Ruzici / (France) Patrice Dominguez, 7–6, retired

== Prize money ==
Event		W	F	SF	QF	4R	3R	2R	1R
Singles	Men	FF200,000	FF105,000	FF52,500	FF26,300	FF15,300	FF8,400	FF5,000	FF2,800
Singles	Women	FF100,000	FF50,000	FF20,000	FF8,000	-	FF4,000	FF2,000	FF1,000

Total prize money for the event was FF2,035,764.

Preceded by 1977 Australian Open	Grand Slams	Succeeded by 1978 Wimbledon Championships
