= 1978 French Open – Men's doubles =

Men's doubles
- 1978 French Open

Final
- Champion: (United States) Gene Mayer (United States) Hank Pfister
- Runner-up: (Spain) José Higueras (Spain) Manuel Orantes
- Score: 6–3, 6–2, 6–2

Details
- Draw: 64
- Seeds: 16

Events
Singles	men	women		boys	girls
Doubles	men	women	mixed	boys	girls
WC Singles	men	women	quad
WC Doubles	men	women	quad
Legends	−45	45+	women
← 1977 ·	French Open	· 1979 →

Brian Gottfried and Raúl Ramírez were the defending champions but lost in the semifinals to Gene Mayer and Hank Pfister.

Gene Mayer and Hank Pfister won in the final 6–3, 6–2, 6–2 against José Higueras and Manuel Orantes.

== Seeds ==
1. (United States) Brian Gottfried / (Mexico) Raúl Ramírez (semifinals)
2. (Australia) Phil Dent / (South Africa) Bob Hewitt (second round)
3. (Poland) Wojtek Fibak / (Netherlands) Tom Okker (semifinals)
4. (Czechoslovakia) Jan Kodeš / (Czechoslovakia) Tomáš Šmíd (quarterfinals)
5. (Australia) Colin Dibley / (Australia) Kim Warwick (third round)
6. (United States) Arthur Ashe / (United States) Fred McNair (quarterfinals)
7. (Chile) Patricio Cornejo / (Chile) Hans Gildemeister (third round)
8. (Australia) Mark Edmondson / (Australia) John Marks (quarterfinals)
9. (West Germany) Jürgen Fassbender / (West Germany) Karl Meiler (second round)
10. (United States) Gene Mayer / (United States) Henry Pfister (champions)
11. (Spain) Antonio Muñoz / (Italy) Antonio Zugarelli (second round)
12. (United States) Tim Gullikson / (United States) Tom Gullikson (third round)
13. (Spain) José Higueras / (Spain) Manuel Orantes (final)
14. (United States) Victor Amaya / (United States) Terry Moor (third round)
15. (Australia) Bob Carmichael / (United States) Brian Teacher (third round)
16. (United States) Dick Stockton / (United States) Erik van Dillen (quarterfinals)

== Draw ==
=== Key ===
- Q = Qualifier
- WC = Wild card
- LL = Lucky loser
- Alt = Alternate
- ITF = ITF entry
- PR = Protected ranking
- SR = Special ranking
- SE = Special exempt
- JE = Junior exempt
- JR = Junior Accelerator Programme entrant
- CO = College Accelerator Programme entrant
- NG = Next Gen Accelerator Program entrant
- w/o = Walkover
- r = Retired
- d = Defaulted

=== Finals ===
Quarterfinals
1	(United States) Brian Gottfried (Mexico) Raúl Ramírez	6	6
6	(United States) Arthur Ashe (United States) Fred McNair	4	2
4	(Czechoslovakia) Jan Kodeš (Czechoslovakia) Tomáš Šmíd	3	7	5
10	(United States) Gene Mayer (United States) Hank Pfister	6	6	7
8	(Australia) Mark Edmondson (Australia) John Marks	6	4	3
3	(Poland) Wojtek Fibak (Netherlands) Tom Okker	4	6	6
16	(United States) Dick Stockton (United States) Erik van Dillen	0	5
13	(Spain) José Higueras (Spain) Manuel Orantes	6	7

Semifinals
1	(United States) Brian Gottfried (Mexico) Raúl Ramírez	6	1	3
10	(United States) Gene Mayer (United States) Hank Pfister	2	6	6
3	(Poland) Wojtek Fibak (Netherlands) Tom Okker	2	4
13	(Spain) José Higueras (Spain) Manuel Orantes	6	6

Final
10	(United States) Gene Mayer (United States) Hank Pfister	6	6	6
13	(Spain) José Higueras (Spain) Manuel Orantes	3	2	2

=== Top half ===
==== Section 1 ====
First round
1	(United States) B Gottfried (Mexico) R Ramírez	7	6
(France) P Dominguez (France) F Jauffret	6	2
(United States) D Ralston (United States) S Smith	7	3	6
(South Africa) B Bertram (South Africa) B Mitton	5	6	4
(United States) J Borowiak (New Zealand) C Lewis	6	6
(Colombia) Á Betancur (Colombia) I Molina	3	3
(France) D Bedel (France) J-F Caujolle	4	4
11	(Spain) A Muñoz (Italy) A Zugarelli	6	6
15	(Australia) B Carmichael (United States) B Teacher	6	6	6
(Czechoslovakia) S Birner (Czechoslovakia) J Granát	3	7	2
(France) A Jumatano (France) C Ros	4	7	6
(Argentina) F Dalla Fontana (Chile) P Rodríguez	6	6	8
(Argentina) E Caviglia (Argentina) T Vázquez	1	4
(Argentina) JL Clerc (Chile) B Prajoux	6	6
(Canada) G Halder (Canada) D Power	3	4
6	(United States) A Ashe (United States) F McNair	6	6

Second round
1	(United States) B Gottfried (Mexico) R Ramírez	3	6	6
(United States) D Ralston (United States) S Smith	6	3	4
(United States) J Borowiak (New Zealand) C Lewis	6	5	6
11	(Spain) A Muñoz (Italy) A Zugarelli	3	7	4
15	(Australia) B Carmichael (United States) B Teacher	6	6
(Argentina) F Dalla Fontana (Chile) P Rodríguez	3	2
(Argentina) JL Clerc (Chile) B Prajoux	3	6	2
6	(United States) A Ashe (United States) F McNair	6	4	6

Third round
1	(United States) B Gottfried (Mexico) R Ramírez	6	6
(United States) J Borowiak (New Zealand) C Lewis	3	1
15	(Australia) B Carmichael (United States) B Teacher	4	2
6	(United States) A Ashe (United States) F McNair	6	6

Quarterfinals
1	(United States) B Gottfried (Mexico) R Ramírez	6	6
6	(United States) A Ashe (United States) F McNair	4	2

==== Section 2 ====
First round
4	(Czechoslovakia) J Kodeš (Czechoslovakia) T Šmíd	6	6
(France) É Deblicker (France) P Proisy	3	4
(Argentina) R Cano (Brazil) C Kirmayr	6	6
(Colombia) C Behar (Colombia) A Cortes	3	4
(France) G Goven (France) J-L Haillet	6	6
(Australia) B Giltinan (Australia) J Trickey	4	3
(Argentina) F Mastelli (Argentina) L Soriano	2	3
14	(United States) V Amaya (United States) T Moor	6	6
10	(United States) Gene Mayer (United States) H Pfister	6	6
(United States) J McManus (Australia) B Phillips-Moore	2	0
(Mexico) R Chávez (Argentina) J Todero	2	4
(Australia) J James (Australia) P McNamee	6	6
(France) P Beust (France) D Contet	6	6
(France) B Fritz (France) B Paul	4	2
(Chile) C Eynaudi (Chile) A Hartmann	2	6
7	(Chile) P Cornejo (Chile) H Gildemeister	6	7

Second round
4	(Czechoslovakia) J Kodeš (Czechoslovakia) T Šmíd	4	6	6
(Argentina) R Cano (Brazil) C Kirmayr	6	3	3
(France) G Goven (France) J-L Haillet	3	5
14	(United States) V Amaya (United States) T Moor	6	7
10	(United States) Gene Mayer (United States) H Pfister	6	6
(Australia) J James (Australia) P McNamee	3	3
(France) P Beust (France) D Contet	1	2
7	(Chile) P Cornejo (Chile) H Gildemeister	6	6

Third round
4	(Czechoslovakia) J Kodeš (Czechoslovakia) T Šmíd	6	3	6
14	(United States) V Amaya (United States) T Moor	4	6	1
10	(United States) Gene Mayer (United States) H Pfister	6	6	6
7	(Chile) P Cornejo (Chile) H Gildemeister	4	7	1

Quarterfinals
4	(Czechoslovakia) J Kodeš (Czechoslovakia) T Šmíd	3	7	5
10	(United States) Gene Mayer (United States) H Pfister	6	6	7

=== Bottom half ===
==== Section 3 ====
First round
8	(Australia) M Edmondson (Australia) J Marks	6	6	6
(Switzerland) H Günthardt (Australia) W Lloyd	7	4	4
(United States) S Krulevitz (South Africa) J Yuill	2	6	6
(France) G Moretton (France) Y Noah	6	3	8
(Italy) G Ocleppo (France) C Roger-Vasselin	6	6
(Sweden) B Andersson (Netherlands) L Sanders	1	4
(France) P Barthès (France) D Naegelen	6	3	2
9	(West Germany) J Fassbender (West Germany) K Meiler	3	6	6
12	(United States) T Gullikson (United States) T Gullikson	7	6
(United States) J Meyers (United States) P Pearson	6	3
(Australia) J Bartlett (Australia) D Carter	3	6
(United States) B Martin (New Zealand) O Parun	6	7
(Australia) P McNamara (Australia) T Rocavert	6	6
(West Germany) R Gehring (Spain) J Soler	3	2
(Italy) P Bertolucci (Italy) A Panatta	4	5
3	(Poland) W Fibak (Netherlands) T Okker	6	7

Second round
8	(Australia) M Edmondson (Australia) J Marks	6	6
(France) G Moretton (France) Y Noah	3	4
(Italy) G Ocleppo (France) C Roger-Vasselin	6	6	6
9	(West Germany) J Fassbender (West Germany) K Meiler	7	2	3
12	(United States) T Gullikson (United States) T Gullikson	6	6
(United States) B Martin (New Zealand) O Parun	3	2
(Australia) P McNamara (Australia) T Rocavert	1	2
3	(Poland) W Fibak (Netherlands) T Okker	6	6

Third round
8	(Australia) M Edmondson (Australia) J Marks	7	6	6
(Italy) G Ocleppo (France) C Roger-Vasselin	5	7	2
12	(United States) T Gullikson (United States) T Gullikson	3	4
3	(Poland) W Fibak (Netherlands) T Okker	6	6

Quarterfinals
8	(Australia) M Edmondson (Australia) J Marks	6	4	3
3	(Poland) W Fibak (Netherlands) T Okker	4	6	6

==== Section 4 ====
First round
5	(Australia) C Dibley (Australia) K Warwick	6	6
(France) C Freyss (France) P Portes	2	3
(Chile) Á Fillol (Ecuador) R Ycaza	7	7
(Italy) C Barazzutti (Italy) G Majoli	6	5
(Argentina) L Álvarez (Paraguay) V Pecci	6	6
(United States) P DuPré (India) S Menon	2	2
(United States) M Fishbach (United States) N Saviano	4	6
16	(United States) D Stockton (United States) E van Dillen	6	7
13	(Spain) J Higueras (Spain) M Orantes	6	6
(United States) G Hardie (United States) B Scanlon	2	3
(France) G Toulon (United States) V Winitsky	6	1	8
(Czechoslovakia) I Lendl (Czechoslovakia) P Složil	4	6	6
(Egypt) I El Shafei (New Zealand) B Fairlie	6	6
(Spain) J Moreno (Chile) A Pierola	1	1
(United States) J Bailey (Japan) J Kuki	1	0
2	(Australia) P Dent (South Africa) B Hewitt	6	6

Second round
5	(Australia) C Dibley (Australia) K Warwick	7	6
(Chile) Á Fillol (Ecuador) R Ycaza	6	3
(Argentina) L Álvarez (Paraguay) V Pecci	7	3	3
16	(United States) D Stockton (United States) E van Dillen	6	6	6
13	(Spain) J Higueras (Spain) M Orantes	6	6
(France) G Toulon (United States) V Winitsky	1	2
(Egypt) I El Shafei (New Zealand) B Fairlie	6	2	6
2	(Australia) P Dent (South Africa) B Hewitt	3	6	4

Third round
5	(Australia) C Dibley (Australia) K Warwick	3	5
16	(United States) D Stockton (United States) E van Dillen	6	7
13	(Spain) J Higueras (Spain) M Orantes	6	6	6
(Egypt) I El Shafei (New Zealand) B Fairlie	7	3	4

Quarterfinals
16	(United States) D Stockton (United States) E van Dillen	0	5
13	(Spain) J Higueras (Spain) M Orantes	6	7
