= 1978 French Open – Women's singles =

Women's singles
- 1978 French Open

Final
- Champion: (Romania) Virginia Ruzici
- Runner-up: (Socialist Federal Republic of Yugoslavia) Mima Jaušovec
- Score: 6–2, 6–2

Details
- Draw: 64
- Seeds: 16

Events
Singles	men	women		boys	girls
Doubles	men	women	mixed	boys	girls
WC Singles	men	women	quad
WC Doubles	men	women	quad
Legends	−45	45+	women
- French Open

Virginia Ruzici defeated defending champion Mima Jaušovec in the final, 6–2, 6–2 to win the women's singles tennis title at the 1978 French Open. It was her first and only major title.

== Seeds ==
The seeded players are listed below. Virginia Ruzici is the champion; others show the round in which they were eliminated.

1. (Socialist Federal Republic of Yugoslavia) Mima Jaušovec (finalist)
2. (Romania) Virginia Ruzici (champion)
3. (Czechoslovakia) Regina Maršíková (semifinals)
4. (United States) Nancy Richey (second round)
5. (United States) Kathy May (quarterfinals)
6. (United States) Janet Newberry (first round)
7. (West Germany) Katja Ebbinghaus (second round)
8. (United States) Laura duPont (first round)
9. (Czechoslovakia) Renáta Tomanová (second round)
10. (Romania) Florența Mihai (first round)
11. (United States) Jeanne Evert (second round)
12. (United Kingdom) Michelle Tyler (second round)
13. (Uruguay) Fiorella Bonicelli (quarterfinals)
14. (Romania) Mariana Simionescu (third round)
15. (United States) Mareen Louie (second round)
16. (United States) Caroline Stoll (first round)

== Draw ==
=== Key ===
- Q = Qualifier
- WC = Wild card
- LL = Lucky loser
- r = Retired

=== Finals ===
Quarterfinals
1	(Socialist Federal Republic of Yugoslavia) Mima Jaušovec	6	6
5	(United States) Kathy May	4	2
3	(Czechoslovakia) Regina Maršíková	6	6
Q	(West Germany) Helga Masthoff	3	3
Q	(Czechoslovakia) Mirka Bendlová	3	3
(France) Brigitte Simon	6	6
13	(Uruguay) Fiorella Bonicelli	7	4	6
2	(Romania) Virginia Ruzici	6	6	8

Semifinals
1	(Socialist Federal Republic of Yugoslavia) Mima Jaušovec	6	6
3	(Czechoslovakia) Regina Maršíková	3	4
(France) Brigitte Simon	3	0
2	(Romania) Virginia Ruzici	6	6

Finals
1	(Socialist Federal Republic of Yugoslavia) Mima Jaušovec	2	2
2	(Romania) Virginia Ruzici	6	6

=== Earlier rounds ===
==== Section 1 ====
First round
1	(Socialist Federal Republic of Yugoslavia) Jaušovec	6	6
(United States) Walsh	1	3
(United States) Nagelsen	6	7
(West Germany) Hanika	4	5
Q	(Australia) Bowrey	7	6
(United Kingdom) Coles	5	4
12	(United Kingdom) Tyler	6	6
(United States) Gerulaitis	2	2
9	(Czechoslovakia) Tomanová	6	7
Q	(Australia) Gregory	1	5
(Czechoslovakia) Strachoňová	7	6
(Argentina) Giscafré	6	1
(Denmark) Sparre-Viragh	6	6
(Sweden) Wikstedt	3	4
5	(United States) May	6	6
(United States) Ganz	1	2

Second round
1	(Socialist Federal Republic of Yugoslavia) Jaušovec	6	6
(United States) Nagelsen	4	2
Q	(Australia) Bowrey	7	6
12	(United Kingdom) Tyler	5	4
9	(Czechoslovakia) Tomanová	3	7	4
(Czechoslovakia) Strachoňová	6	6	6
(Denmark) Sparre-Viragh	6	2	6
5	(United States) May	4	6	8

Third round
1	(Socialist Federal Republic of Yugoslavia) Jaušovec	6	6
Q	(Australia) Bowrey	1	3
(Czechoslovakia) Strachoňová	1	0
5	(United States) May	6	6

Quarterfinals
1	(Socialist Federal Republic of Yugoslavia) Jaušovec	6	6
5	(United States) May	4	2

==== Section 2 ====
First round
3	(Czechoslovakia) Maršíková	7	6
(Australia) Whytcross	5	1
(United States) Desfor	6	6	6
(Sweden) Anliot	7	3	3
Q	(Czechoslovakia) Budařová	6	6
(United Kingdom) Fayter	1	3
14	(Romania) Simionescu	6	6
(Australia) Evers	4	2
15	(United States) Louie	6	6
(United States) Harris	2	3
Q	(West Germany) Masthoff	4	6	6
Q	(Argentina) Madruga	6	0	4
(Australia) Hunt	6	6
(United States) Ornstein	2	3
7	(West Germany) Ebbinghaus	6	2	6
(Australia) O'Neil	2	6	2

Second round
3	(Czechoslovakia) Maršíková	6	6
(United States) Desfor	0	4
Q	(Czechoslovakia) Budařová	7	5	3
14	(Romania) Simionescu	6	7	6
15	(United States) Louie	6	4	2
Q	(West Germany) Masthoff	3	6	6
(Australia) Hunt	6	5	6
7	(West Germany) Ebbinghaus	4	7	0

Third round
3	(Czechoslovakia) Maršíková	6	6
14	(Romania) Simionescu	1	4
Q	(West Germany) Masthoff	7	6
(Australia) Hunt	6	4

Quarterfinals
3	(Czechoslovakia) Maršíková	6	6
Q	(West Germany) Masthoff	3	3

==== Section 3 ====
First round
Q	(Czechoslovakia) Bendlová	6	2	6
8	(United States) Du Pont	4	6	3
(France) Rual	6	6
(Hungary) Klein	1	2
(Brazil) Medrado	6	2	6
(West Germany) Riedel	4	6	3
11	(United States) Evert	6	6	6
(Italy) Simmonds	7	3	2
(France) Simon	7	6
10	(Romania) Mihai	5	2
Q	(Australia) Tobin	6	6
(United States) Stratton	1	2
(Argentina) González	6	6
(Sweden) Bohm	4	3
4	(United States) Richey	6	6
(United States) Bostrom	2	2

Second round
Q	(Czechoslovakia) Bendlová	1	6	6
(France) Rual	6	2	3
(Brazil) Medrado	6	6
11	(United States) Evert	1	2
(France) Simon	6	6
Q	(Australia) Tobin	1	1
(Argentina) González	6	4	6
4	(United States) Richey	4	6	3

Third round
Q	(Czechoslovakia) Bendlová	6	6
(Brazil) Medrado	3	4
(France) Simon	6	6
(Argentina) González	4	3

Quarterfinals
Q	(Czechoslovakia) Bendlová	3	3
(France) Simon	6	6

==== Section 4 ====
First round
(United States) Teeguarden	7	2	7
6	(United States) Newberry	5	6	5
(West Germany) Eisterlehner	4	6	6
(United States) Smith	6	3	2
Q	(Czechoslovakia) Mandlíková	6	6
(Hungary) Pinterová	2	1
13	(Uruguay) Bonicelli	6	6
(France) Fuchs	4	1
(France) Thibault	6	6
16	(United States) Stoll	3	4
(United States) Latham	4	6	6
(France) Lovera	6	4	4
(Sweden) Ekblom	6	7
(Australia) Doerner	2	5
2	(Romania) Ruzici	6	6
(Canada) Blackwood	4	0

Second round
(United States) Teeguarden	6	6
(West Germany) Eisterlehner	1	4
Q	(Czechoslovakia) Mandlíková	2	5
13	(Uruguay) Bonicelli	6	7
(France) Thibault	7	6
(United States) Latham	5	3
(Sweden) Ekblom	1	3
2	(Romania) Ruzici	6	6

Third round
(United States) Teeguarden	3	7	4
13	(Uruguay) Bonicelli	6	6	6
(France) Thibault	3	2
2	(Romania) Ruzici	6	6

Quarterfinals
13	(Uruguay) Bonicelli	7	4	6
2	(Romania) Ruzici	6	6	8

Preceded by 1977 Australian Open (December) – Women's singles	Grand Slam women's singles	Succeeded by 1978 Wimbledon Championships – Women's singles
