= Virginia Ruzici =

Romanian tennis player

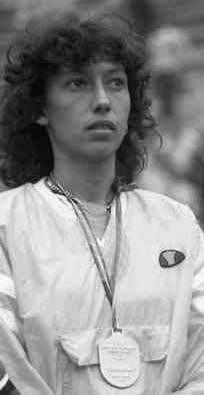
- Virginia Ruzici at the 1981 Summer Universiade
- Country (sports): Romania
- Born: 31 January 1955 (age 71) Câmpia Turzii, Socialist Republic of Romania
- Height: 1.73 m (5 ft 8 in)
- Turned pro: 1975
- Retired: 1987
- Plays: Right-handed (one-handed backhand)
- Prize money: $1,183,728

Singles
- Career record: 377–221
- Career titles: 12
- Highest ranking: No. 8 (21 May 1979)

Grand Slam singles results
- Australian Open: QF (1980)
- French Open: W (1978)
- Wimbledon: QF (1978, 1981)
- US Open: QF (1976, 1978)

Doubles
- Career record: 285–181
- Career titles: 16
- Highest ranking: No. 70 (12 October 1987)

Grand Slam doubles results
- Australian Open: 2R (1980)
- French Open: W (1978)
- Wimbledon: F (1978)
- US Open: SF (1976)

Grand Slam mixed doubles results
- French Open: F (1978, 1979)
- Wimbledon: 3R (1979)
- US Open: QF (1981)

Team competitions
- Fed Cup: 25–13
Medal record
Representing Romania
Summer Universiade
Gold medal – first place	1977 Sofia	Doubles
Gold medal – first place	1979 Mexico City	Doubles
Gold medal – first place	1979 Mexico City	Mixed doubles
Gold medal – first place	1981 Bucharest	Singles
Gold medal – first place	1981 Bucharest	Doubles
Gold medal – first place	1981 Bucharest	Mixed doubles
Silver medal – second place	1977 Sofia	Mixed doubles
Bronze medal – third place	1979 Mexico City	Singles

Virginia Ruzici (born 31 January 1955) is a Romanian former professional tennis player. She won the 1978 French Open singles championship.

== Career ==
Ruzici became a professional tennis player in 1975. One of her main assets on court was her powerful forehand. In a career spanning 12 years, Ruzici won 12 career singles titles, including one Grand Slam title, the 1978 French Open. In the final, she beat 1977 French Open champion Mima Jaušovec 6–2, 6–2. Ruzici also won the French Open doubles event with Jaušovec in 1978 and reached the mixed doubles final in 1978. She appeared in the French Open singles final in 1980, but lost in straight sets to Chris Evert.

Ruzici remained in the world's top 20 from 1977 to 1983. She regularly featured in the Romania Fed Cup team throughout her career, and began playing for them in 1973, two years before turning professional.

At Wimbledon 1978, Ruzici lost a notable match in the quarterfinal to the Australian Evonne Goolagong who was playing with an injured ankle. Goolagong's injury led to her collapsing on court and her husband, Roger Cawley, came on to the court to aid his wife, technically defaulting the Australian from the match. When Goolagong recovered, Ruzici agreed to continue the match, but lost 7–5, 6–3 and was praised for her sportsmanship. It has been stated during TV commentaries that Ruzici's victory in 1980 at a tournament in Salt Lake City was watched by Richard Williams who was inspired by her triumph and prize money to teach his daughters Venus and Serena Williams to play tennis.

Ruzici was the manager of Romanian tennis player Simona Halep until 2022.

== Grand Slam tournament finals ==
=== Singles: 2 (1 title, 1 runner–up) ===
Result	Year	Championship	Surface	Opponent	Score
Win	1978	French Open	Clay	(Socialist Federal Republic of Yugoslavia) Mima Jaušovec	6–2, 6–2
Loss	1980	French Open	Clay	(United States) Chris Evert	0–6, 3–6

=== Doubles: 2 (1 title, 1 runner–up) ===
Result	Year	Championship	Surface	Partner	Opponents	Score
Win	1978	French Open	Clay	(Socialist Federal Republic of Yugoslavia) Mima Jaušovec	(France) Gail Sherriff Lovera (Australia) Lesley Turner Bowrey	6–4, 6–3
Loss	1978	Wimbledon	Grass	(Socialist Federal Republic of Yugoslavia) Mima Jaušovec	(Australia) Kerry Melville Reid (Australia) Wendy Turnbull	6–4, 8–9^{(8)}, 3–6

=== Mixed doubles: 2 (2 runner-ups) ===
Result	Year	Championship	Surface	Partner	Opponents	Score
Loss	1978	French Open	Clay	(France) Patrice Dominguez	(Czechoslovakia) Renáta Tomanová (Czechoslovakia) Pavel Složil	6–4, 6–7, ret.
Loss	1979	French Open	Clay	(Romania) Ion Țiriac	(Australia) Wendy Turnbull (South Africa) Bob Hewitt	3–6, 6–2, 3–6

== WTA career finals ==
=== Singles: 27 (12–15) ===
Legend Grand Slam tournaments (1–1) WTA Championships (0–0) Virginia Slims, Avon, other (11–14)	Finals by surface Hard (1–2) Grass (0–1) Clay (9–10) Carpet (2–2)

Result	W/L	Date	Tournament	Surface	Opponent	Score
Win	1–0	Aug 1975	South Orange, Canada	Clay	(Romania) Mariana Simionescu	6–1, 6–1
Loss	1–1	Jul 1976	Austrian Open	Clay	(Australia) Wendy Turnbull	4–6, 7–5, 3–6
Loss	1–2	Oct 1976	Spanish Open	Clay	(Czechoslovakia) Renáta Tomanová	6–3, 4–6, 2–6
Win	2–2	Sep 1977	Eckerd Open, U.S.	Clay	(United States) Laura duPont	6–4, 4–6, 6–2
Loss	2–3	May 1978	German Open	Clay	(Socialist Federal Republic of Yugoslavia) Mima Jaušovec	2–6, 3–6
Loss	2–4	May 1978	Italian Open	Clay	(Czechoslovakia) Regina Maršíková	5–7, 5–7
Win	3–4	May 1978	French Open	Clay	(Socialist Federal Republic of Yugoslavia) Mima Jaušovec	6–2, 6–2
Win	4–4	Jul 1978	Austrian Open	Clay	(West Germany) Sylvia Hanika	6–4, 6–3
Loss	4–5	Aug 1978	Canadian Open	Hard	(Czechoslovakia) Regina Maršíková	5–7, 7–6, 2–6
Win	5–5	Oct 1978	Brighton Challenge, UK	Carpet (i)	(Netherlands) Betty Stöve	5–7, 6–2, 7–5
Loss	5–6	Feb 1979	VS Detroit	Carpet (i)	(Australia) Wendy Turnbull	5–7, 6–1, 6–7^{(4)}
Loss	5–7	Dec 1979	Adelaide, Australia	Grass	(Czechoslovakia) Hana Mandlíková	5–7, 2–2 ret.
Loss	5–8	May 1980	Italian Open	Clay	(United States) Chris Evert	7–5, 2–6, 2–6
Loss	5–9	May 1980	French Open	Clay	(United States) Chris Evert	0–6, 3–6
Win	6–9	Jul 1980	Austrian Open	Clay	(Czechoslovakia) Hana Mandlíková	3–6, 6–1, ret.
Loss	6–10	Aug 1980	Canadian Open	Hard	(United States) Chris Evert	3–6, 1–6
Win	7–10	Sep 1980	VS Salt Lake City, U.S.	Hard	(Argentina) Ivanna Madruga	6–1, 6–3
Loss	7–11	Nov 1980	Amsterdam, Netherlands	Carpet (i)	(Czechoslovakia) Hana Mandlíková	7–5, 2–6, 5–7
Loss	7–12	May 1981	Italian Open	Clay	(United States) Chris Evert	1–6, 2–6
Loss	7–13	May 1981	European Open	Clay	(United States) Chris Evert	1–6, 1–6
Loss	7–14	Aug 1981	U.S. Clay Courts	Clay	(United States) Andrea Jaeger	1–6, 0–6
Win	8–14	Jul 1982	Monte Carlo, Monaco	Clay	(United States) Bonnie Gadusek	6–2, 7–6
Win	9–14	Jul 1982	Austrian Open	Clay	(Czechoslovakia) Lea Plchová	6–2, 6–2
Win	10–14	Aug 1982	U.S. Clay Courts	Clay	(Czechoslovakia) Helena Suková	6–2, 6–0
Win	11–14	Oct 1983	VS Detroit, U.S.	Carpet (i)	(United States) Kathy Jordan	4–6, 6–4, 6–2
Loss	11–15	Apr 1985	Seabrook Island, U.S.	Clay	(Bulgaria) Katerina Maleeva	3–6, 3–6
Win	12–15	Jul 1985	Austrian Open	Clay	(Socialist Federal Republic of Yugoslavia) Mima Jaušovec	6–2, 6–3

=== Doubles: 35 (16–19) ===
Legend Grand Slam tournaments (1–1) WTA Championships (0–0) Virginia Slims, Avon, other (15–18)	Finals by surface Hard (2–1) Grass (1–1) Clay (10–11) Carpet (3–6)

Result	No.	Date	Tournament	Surface	Partner	Opponents	Score
Loss	1.	Nov 1973	London, UK	Carpet (i)	(Romania) Mariana Simionescu	(United Kingdom) Lesley Charles (United Kingdom) Glynis Coles	3–6, 5–7
Win	1.	Nov 1974	Edinburgh Cup, UK	Carpet (i)	(Socialist Federal Republic of Yugoslavia) Mima Jaušovec	(Colombia) María-Isabel Fernández (Argentina) Raquel Giscafré	6–4, 4–6, 6–4
Loss	2.	Mar 1976	Tallahassee, U.S.	Clay	(Romania) Mariana Simionescu	(United States) Julie Anthony (Australia) Dianne Fromholtz	2–6, 5–7
Loss	3.	May 1976	Italian Open	Clay	(Romania) Mariana Simionescu	(South Africa) Linky Boshoff (South Africa) Ilana Kloss	1–6, 2–6
Win	2.	Oct 1976	Spanish Open	Clay	(Romania) Florența Mihai	(France) Nathalie Fuchs (Belgium) Michele Gurdal	6–2, 6–4
Loss	4.	Jan 1977	Minneapolis Indoors, U.S.	Carpet (i)	(Socialist Federal Republic of Yugoslavia) Mima Jaušovec	(United States) Rosie Casals (Czechoslovakia) Martina Navratilova	2–6, 1–6
Win	3.	May 1978	German Open	Clay	(Socialist Federal Republic of Yugoslavia) Mima Jaušovec	(West Germany) Katja Ebbinghaus (West Germany) Helga Niessen Masthoff	6–4, 5–7, 6–0
Win	4.	May 1978	Italian Open	Clay	(Socialist Federal Republic of Yugoslavia) Mima Jaušovec	(Romania) Florența Mihai (United States) Betsy Nagelsen	6–2, 2–6, 7–6
Win	5.	May 1978	French Open	Clay	(Socialist Federal Republic of Yugoslavia) Mima Jaušovec	(France) Gail Sherriff Lovera (Australia) Lesley Turner Bowrey	5–7, 6–4, 8–6
Loss	5.	Jun 1978	Wimbledon, UK	Grass	(Socialist Federal Republic of Yugoslavia) Mima Jaušovec	(Australia) Kerry Melville Reid (Australia) Wendy Turnbull	6–4, 8–9^{(8)}, 3–6
Win	6.	Jul 1978	Austrian Open	Clay	(Czechoslovakia) Renáta Tomanová	(Czechoslovakia) Regina Maršíková (Romania) Florența Mihai	7–5, 6–2
Loss	6.	Oct 1978	Porsche Tennis Grand Prix, Germany	Carpet (i)	(Socialist Federal Republic of Yugoslavia) Mima Jaušovec	(United States) Tracy Austin (Netherlands) Betty Stöve	3–6, 3–6
Win	7.	Jan 1979	VS Washington, U.S.	Carpet (i)	(Socialist Federal Republic of Yugoslavia) Mima Jaušovec	(United States) Renée Richards (United States) Sharon Walsh	4–6, 6–2, 6–4
Loss	7.	Jul 1979	Austrian Open	Clay	(Netherlands) Elly Appel-Vessies	(Sweden) Helena Anliot (Australia) Dianne Evers	0–6, 4–6
Win	8.	Oct 1979	Tampa Open, U.S.	Hard	(United States) Anne Smith	(South Africa) Ilana Kloss (United States) Betty Ann Stuart	7–5, 4–6, 7–5
Win	9.	Dec 1979	Adelaide, Australia	Grass	(Czechoslovakia) Hana Mandlíková	(United Kingdom) Sue Barker (United States) Pam Shriver	6–1, 3–6, 6–2
Loss	8.	Aug 1980	U.S. Clay Courts	Clay	(Czechoslovakia) Renáta Tomanová	(United States) Anne Smith (United States) Paula Smith	4–6, 6–3, 4–6
Win	10.	Sep 1980	VS Salt Lake City, U.S.	Hard	(United States) Pam Teeguarden	(United States) Barbara Jordan (United States) JoAnne Russell	6–4, 7–5
Win	11.	Oct 1980	Stockholm Open, Sweden	Carpet (i)	(Socialist Federal Republic of Yugoslavia) Mima Jaušovec	(Czechoslovakia) Hana Mandlíková (Netherlands) Betty Stöve	6–2, 6–1
Loss	9.	Mar 1981	VS Boston, U.S.	Carpet (i)	(United States) JoAnne Russell	(United States) Barbara Potter (United States) Sharon Walsh	7–6, 4–6, 3–6
Loss	10.	May 1981	Italian Open	Clay	(United States) Chris Evert	(United States) Candy Reynolds (United States) Paula Smith	5–7, 1–6
Win	12.	Aug 1981	U.S. Clay Courts	Clay	(United States) JoAnne Russell	(United Kingdom) Sue Barker (United States) Paula Smith	6–2, 6–2
Loss	11.	Apr 1982	Hilton Head Island, U.S.	Clay	(United States) JoAnne Russell	(United States) Martina Navratilova (United States) Pam Shriver	1–6, 2–6
Loss	12.	May 1982	European Open	Clay	(United States) JoAnne Russell	(United States) Candy Reynolds (United States) Paula Smith	2–6, 4–6
Win	13.	Jul 1982	Monte Carlo, Monaco	Clay	(France) Catherine Tanvier	(Brazil) Patricia Medrado (Brazil) Cláudia Monteiro	7–6, 6–2
Loss	13.	Aug 1982	U.S. Clay Courts	Clay	(United States) JoAnne Russell	(Argentina) Ivanna Madruga (France) Catherine Tanvier	5–7, 6–7^{(3)}
Loss	14.	Dec 1982	European Open	Carpet (i)	(United States) JoAnne Russell	(United States) Rosie Casals (United States) Candy Reynolds	3–6, 3–6
Loss	15.	Apr 1983	Amelia Island Championships, U.S.	Clay	(Czechoslovakia) Hana Mandlíková	(South Africa) Rosalyn Fairbank (United States) Candy Reynolds	4–6, 2–6
Win	14.	May 1983	Italian Open	Clay	(United Kingdom) Virginia Wade	(Argentina) Ivanna Madruga (France) Catherine Tanvier	6–3, 2–6, 6–1
Win	15.	Aug 1983	U.S. Clay Courts	Clay	(United States) Kathy Horvath	(United States) Gigi Fernández (United States) Beth Herr	4–6, 7–6^{(6)}, 6–2
Loss	16.	Aug 1983	LA Championships, U.S.	Hard	(United States) Betsy Nagelsen	(United States) Martina Navratilova (United States) Pam Shriver	1–6, 0–6
Loss	17.	Oct 1983	Porsche Grand Prix, Germany	Carpet (i)	(France) Catherine Tanvier	(United States) Martina Navratilova (United States) Candy Reynolds	2–6, 1–6
Loss	18.	May 1984	German Open	Clay	(United States) Kathy Horvath	(United Kingdom) Anne Hobbs (United States) Candy Reynolds	3–6, 6–4, 6–7^{(11)}
Loss	19.	May 1984	Italian Open	Clay	(United States) Kathy Horvath	(Czechoslovakia) Iva Budařová (Czechoslovakia) Helena Suková	6–7^{(5)}, 6–1, 4–6
Win	16.	Jul 1985	Austrian Open	Clay	(Socialist Federal Republic of Yugoslavia) Mima Jaušovec	(Czechoslovakia) Andrea Holíková (Czechoslovakia) Kateřina Skronská	6–2, 6–3

== Other finals ==
=== Singles (8–4) ===
Result	No.	Date	Tournament	Surface	Opponent	Score
Loss	1.	1 October 1972	Cluj, Romania	Clay	(Romania) Judith Gohn	2–6, 4–6
Win	2.	12 May 1974	Stuttgart, West Germany	Clay	(Czechoslovakia) Alena Palmeová-West	3–6, 6–4, 7–5
Win	3.	23 September 1974	Bucharest, Romania	Clay	(Romania) Mariana Simionescu	6–3, 6–2
Win	4.	16 July 1978	Gstaad, Switzerland	Clay	(Switzerland) Petra Jauch-Delhees	6–2, 6–2
Win	5.	6 August 1978	Brașov, Romania	Clay	(Czechoslovakia) Renáta Tomanová	6–4, 6–2
Win	6.	13 July 1980	Gstaad, Switzerland	Clay	(West Germany) Sylvia Hanika	6–4, 6–3
Win	7.	20 July 1980	Båstad, Sweden	Clay	(Sweden) Nina Bohm	6–2, 7–5
Loss	8.	2 August 1981	Orange, New Jersey, U.S.	Clay	(United States) Kathleen Horvath	0–6, 4–6
Loss	9.	18 April 1982	Nassau, Bahamas	Hard	(West Germany) Bettina Bunge	0–6, 6–7
Loss	10.	11 July 1982	Gstaad, Switzerland	Clay	(West Germany) Claudia Kohde-Kilsch	5–7, 6–1, 6–7
Win	11.	1 August 1982	Orange, New Jersey, U.S.	Clay	(United States) Leigh-Anne Thompson	5–7, 6–2, 6–2
Win	12.	17 July 1983	Båstad, Sweden	Hard	(Sweden) Carin Anderholm	6–2, 6–3

=== Doubles (5–0) ===
Result	No.	Date	Tournament	Surface	Partner	Opponents	Score
Win	1.	1 October 1972	Cluj, Romania	Clay	(Romania) Mariana Simionescu	(Romania) Felicia Bucur (Romania) Judith Gohn	4–6, 7–5, 6–4
Win	2.	23 September 1974	Bucharest, Romania	Clay	(Romania) Mariana Simionescu	(Romania) Florența Mihai (Romania) Simona Nunweiler	6–2, 6–2
Win	3.	17 October 1976	Madrid, Spain	Clay	(Romania) Florența Mihai	(Czechoslovakia) Regina Maršíková (Czechoslovakia) Renáta Tomanová	6–4, 5–7, 6–2
Win	4.	11 July 1982	Gstaad, Switzerland	Clay	(France) Catherine Tanvier	(West Germany) Claudia Kohde-Kilsch (West Germany) Heidi Eisterlehner	3–6, 6–3, 6–4
Win	5.	19 January 1987	Bayonne, France	Hard	(France) Catherine Tanvier	(Poland) Iwona Kuczyńska (France) Corinne Vanier	6–3, 6–2

== Grand Slam singles performance ==
Key
W	F	SF	QF	#R	RR	Q#	DNQ	A	NH

(W) winner; (F) finalist; (SF) semifinalist; (QF) quarterfinalist; (#R) rounds 4, 3, 2, 1; (RR) round-robin stage; (Q#) qualification round; (DNQ) did not qualify; (A) absent; (NH) not held; (SR) strike rate (events won / competed); (W–L) win–loss record.

Tournament	1973	1974	1975	1976	1977		1978	1979	1980	1981	1982	1983	1984	1985	1986	1987	Career SR
Australian Open	A	A	A	A	A	A	A	1R	QF	1R	A	A	A	A	NH	A	0 / 3
French Open	1R	2R	2R	SF	A		W	QF	F	QF	QF	3R	4R	1R	A	2R	1 / 13
Wimbledon	2R	2R	1R	1R	2R		QF	4R	2R	QF	4R	4R	2R	2R	A	A	0 / 13
US Open	A	1R	1R	QF	4R		QF	A	4R	3R	4R	1R	3R	1R	A	A	0 / 11
SR	0 / 2	0 / 3	0 / 3	0 / 3	0 / 2		1 / 3	0 / 3	0 / 4	0 / 4	0 / 3	0 / 3	0 / 3	0 / 3	0 / 0	0 / 1	1 / 40
Year-end ranking			112	26	16		12	13	11	12	11	19	44	41	NR	143	

Note: The Australian Open was held twice in 1977, in January and December.

== See also ==
- Performance timelines for all female tennis players since 1978 who reached at least one Grand Slam tournament final
