= 1977 WTA Tour =

Women's tennis circuit

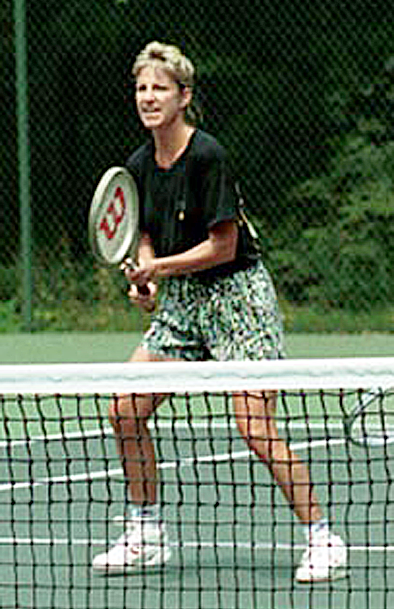
- Chris Evert finished the year as world No. 1 for the third time in her career. She won twelve singles tournaments during the season, including a major at the US Open, as well as the Virginia Slims Championships.

Details
- Duration: 17 October 1976 – 28 November 1977
- Edition: 5th
- Tournaments: 49
- Categories: Grand Slam (4); WTA championships (3); Virginia Slims Circuit (11); Colgate International Series (18)

Achievements (singles)
- Most titles: (United States) Chris Evert (12)
- Most finals: (United States) Chris Evert (14)
- Prize money leader: (United States) Chris Evert ($503,134)
- Points leader: (United States) Chris Evert (17.612)

Awards
- Player of the year: (United Kingdom) Virginia Wade
- Doubles team of the year: (United States) Martina Navratilova (Netherlands) Betty Stöve
- Most improved player of the year: (Australia) Wendy Turnbull
- Newcomer of the year: (United States) Tracy Austin

The 1977 WTA Tour consisted of a number of tennis tournaments for female tennis players. It was composed of two circuits the newly streamlined version of the Virginia Slims Circuit (which was now an 11-week tour of the US) and the world wide Colgate International Series. The year 1977 also saw the creation of the first official ranking system and these rankings were used to determine acceptance into the tournaments.

== Schedule ==
This is a calendar of all events which were part of either the Virginia Slims circuit or the Colgate International Series in the year 1977, with player progression documented from the quarterfinals stage. Also included are the Grand Slam tournaments, the 1977 Virginia Slims Championships, the 1977 Federation Cup and a number of events not affiliated with either tour.

Key

Grand Slam tournaments
Virginia Slims/Colgate Series championships
Virginia Slims Circuit
Colgate International Series
Non-tour events
Team events

=== October (1976) ===
Week	Tournament	Champions	Runners-up	Semifinalists	Quarterfinalists
17 Oct	Colgate Inaugural; Palm Springs, United States; Colgate International Series; Hard – $175,000 – 16S	(United States) Chris Evert; 6–1, 6–2	(France) Françoise Dürr	(United Kingdom) Virginia Wade (3rd) (United States) Terry Holladay (4th)	(United States) Nancy Richey (United States) Martina Navratilova (Netherlands) Betty Stöve (Australia) Dianne Fromholtz
17 Oct	Colgate Inaugural; Palm Springs, United States; Colgate International Series; Hard – $175,000 – 16S	(United States) Chris Evert (United States) Martina Navratilova; 6–2, 6–4	(United States) Billie Jean King (Netherlands) Betty Stöve	(United Kingdom) Virginia Wade (3rd) (United States) Terry Holladay (4th)	(United States) Nancy Richey (United States) Martina Navratilova (Netherlands) Betty Stöve (Australia) Dianne Fromholtz

=== November (1976) ===
Week	Tournament	Champions	Runners-up	Semifinalists	Quarterfinalists
1 Nov	Dewar Cup; London, Great Britain; Colgate International Series; Hard – $35,000	(United Kingdom) Virginia Wade; 6–2, 6–2	(United States) Chris Evert	(United States) Rosie Casals (United Kingdom) Sue Barker	(Netherlands) Betty Stöve (Romania) Florența Mihai (United States) Betsy Nagelsen (United Kingdom) Glynis Coles
1 Nov	Dewar Cup; London, Great Britain; Colgate International Series; Hard – $35,000	(Netherlands) Betty Stöve (United Kingdom) Virginia Wade; 6–3, 2–6, 6–3	(United States) Rosie Casals (United States) Chris Evert	(United States) Rosie Casals (United Kingdom) Sue Barker	(Netherlands) Betty Stöve (Romania) Florența Mihai (United States) Betsy Nagelsen (United Kingdom) Glynis Coles
22 Nov	South African Open; Johannesburg, South Africa; Colgate International Series; Hard – $35,000	(South Africa) Brigitte Cuypers; 6–7, 6–4, 6–1	(United States) Laura duPont	(South Africa) Annette du Plooy (West Germany) Heidi Eisterlehner	(United Kingdom) Lesley Charles (South Africa) Tanya Harford (United Kingdom) Glynis Coles (United States) Stephanie Tolleson
22 Nov	South African Open; Johannesburg, South Africa; Colgate International Series; Hard – $35,000	(United States) Laura duPont (United States) Valerie Ziegenfuss; 6–1, 6–4	(South Africa) Yvonne Vermaak (South Africa) Elizabeth Vlotman	(South Africa) Annette du Plooy (West Germany) Heidi Eisterlehner	(United Kingdom) Lesley Charles (South Africa) Tanya Harford (United Kingdom) Glynis Coles (United States) Stephanie Tolleson
29 Nov	Colgate International Championships; Sydney, Australia; Colgate International Series; Grass – $100,000	(United States) Martina Navratilova; 7–5, 6–2	(Netherlands) Betty Stöve	(Australia) Kerry Reid (Australia) Dianne Fromholtz	(Australia) Evonne Goolagong Cawley (South Africa) Marise Kruger (United Kingdom) Sue Barker (Australia) Margaret Court
29 Nov	Colgate International Championships; Sydney, Australia; Colgate International Series; Grass – $100,000	(United States) Martina Navratilova (Netherlands) Betty Stöve; 6–3, 7–5	(France) Françoise Dürr (United States) Ann Kiyomura	(Australia) Kerry Reid (Australia) Dianne Fromholtz	(Australia) Evonne Goolagong Cawley (South Africa) Marise Kruger (United Kingdom) Sue Barker (Australia) Margaret Court

=== December (1976) ===
Week	Tournament	Champions	Runners-up	Semifinalists	Quarterfinalists
6 Dec	Toyota Women's Classic; Melbourne, Australia; Colgate International Series; Grass – $75,000	(Australia) Margaret Court; 6–2, 6–2	(United Kingdom) Sue Barker	(Netherlands) Betty Stöve (Australia) Dianne Fromholtz	(United States) JoAnne Russell (France) Françoise Dürr (United States) Janet Newberry (South Africa) Ilana Kloss
6 Dec	Toyota Women's Classic; Melbourne, Australia; Colgate International Series; Grass – $75,000	(Australia) Margaret Court (Netherlands) Betty Stöve; 6–2, 6–4	(South Africa) Linky Boshoff (South Africa) Ilana Kloss	(Netherlands) Betty Stöve (Australia) Dianne Fromholtz	(United States) JoAnne Russell (France) Françoise Dürr (United States) Janet Newberry (South Africa) Ilana Kloss
26 Dec	Marlboro NSW Open; Sydney, Australia; Colgate Series; Grass – $35,000	(Australia) Kerry Reid; 3–6, 6–2, 6–3	(Australia) Dianne Fromholtz	(Australia) Karen Krantzcke (Czechoslovakia) Renáta Tomanová	(Australia) Wendy Turnbull (Australia) Lesley Bowrey (Romania) Virginia Ruzici (Australia) Amanda Tobin
26 Dec	Marlboro NSW Open; Sydney, Australia; Colgate Series; Grass – $35,000	(Australia) Helen Gourlay (United States) Betsy Nagelsen; 6–4, 6–1	(Australia) Dianne Fromholtz (Czechoslovakia) Renáta Tomanová	(Australia) Karen Krantzcke (Czechoslovakia) Renáta Tomanová	(Australia) Wendy Turnbull (Australia) Lesley Bowrey (Romania) Virginia Ruzici (Australia) Amanda Tobin

=== January ===
Week	Tournament	Champions	Runners-up	Semifinalists	Quarterfinalists
3 Jan	Australian Open; Melbourne, Australia; Grand Slam; Grass – 32S/16D; Singles – Doubles	(Australia) Kerry Reid; 7–5, 6–2	(Australia) Dianne Fromholtz	(Australia) Karen Krantzcke (Australia) Helen Gourlay	(Australia) Jan Wilton (Japan) Naoko Sato (Australia) Mary Sawyer (West Germany) Katja Ebbinghaus
3 Jan	Australian Open; Melbourne, Australia; Grand Slam; Grass – 32S/16D; Singles – Doubles	(Australia) Dianne Fromholtz (Australia) Helen Gourlay; 5–7, 6–1, 7–5	(United States) Betsy Nagelsen (Australia) Kerry Reid	(Australia) Karen Krantzcke (Australia) Helen Gourlay	(Australia) Jan Wilton (Japan) Naoko Sato (Australia) Mary Sawyer (West Germany) Katja Ebbinghaus
3 Jan	Virginia Slims of Washington; Washington, United States; Virginia Slims; Carpet (i) – $100,000 – 32S/16D	(United States) Martina Navratilova; 6–2, 6–3	(United States) Chris Evert	(Australia) Wendy Turnbull (United Kingdom) Virginia Wade	(United Kingdom) Sue Barker (United States) Beth Norton (France) Françoise Dürr (United States) Janet Newberry
3 Jan	Virginia Slims of Washington; Washington, United States; Virginia Slims; Carpet (i) – $100,000 – 32S/16D	(United States) Martina Navratilova (Netherlands) Betty Stöve; 7–5, 6–2	(United States) Kristien Shaw (United States) Valerie Ziegenfuss	(Australia) Wendy Turnbull (United Kingdom) Virginia Wade	(United Kingdom) Sue Barker (United States) Beth Norton (France) Françoise Dürr (United States) Janet Newberry
10 Jan	Virginia Slims of Florida; Hollywood, United States; Virginia Slims; Carpet (i) – $100,000 – 34S/16D	(United States) Chris Evert; 6–3, 6–4	(Australia) Margaret Court	(United Kingdom) Sue Barker (United Kingdom) Virginia Wade	(Netherlands) Betty Stöve (United States) Martina Navratilova (United States) JoAnne Russell (Socialist Federal Republic of Yugoslavia) Mima Jaušovec
10 Jan	Virginia Slims of Florida; Hollywood, United States; Virginia Slims; Carpet (i) – $100,000 – 34S/16D	(United States) Martina Navratilova (Netherlands) Betty Stöve; 6–4, 3–6, 6–4	(United States) Rosie Casals (United States) Chris Evert	(United Kingdom) Sue Barker (United Kingdom) Virginia Wade	(Netherlands) Betty Stöve (United States) Martina Navratilova (United States) JoAnne Russell (Socialist Federal Republic of Yugoslavia) Mima Jaušovec
17 Jan	Virginia Slims of Houston; Houston, United States; Virginia Slims; Carpet (i) – $100,000 – 32S/13D	(United States) Martina Navratilova; 7–6^{(5–3)}, 7–5	(United Kingdom) Sue Barker	(Socialist Federal Republic of Yugoslavia) Mima Jaušovec (Australia) Dianne Fromholtz	(Australia) Wendy Turnbull (United States) Kristien Shaw (South Africa) Greer Stevens (United States) Carrie Meyer
17 Jan	Virginia Slims of Houston; Houston, United States; Virginia Slims; Carpet (i) – $100,000 – 32S/13D	(United States) Martina Navratilova (Netherlands) Betty Stöve; 4–6, 6–2, 6–1	(United Kingdom) Sue Barker (United States) Ann Kiyomura	(Socialist Federal Republic of Yugoslavia) Mima Jaušovec (Australia) Dianne Fromholtz	(Australia) Wendy Turnbull (United States) Kristien Shaw (South Africa) Greer Stevens (United States) Carrie Meyer
24 Jan	Virginia Slims of Minneapolis; Minneapolis, United States; Virginia Slims; Carpet (i) – $100,000 – 33S/14D	(United States) Martina Navratilova; 6–0, 6–1	(United Kingdom) Sue Barker	(United States) Rosie Casals (Soviet Union) Olga Morozova	(United Kingdom) Virginia Wade (Australia) Margaret Court (Socialist Federal Republic of Yugoslavia) Mima Jaušovec (Soviet Union) Natasha Chmyreva
24 Jan	Virginia Slims of Minneapolis; Minneapolis, United States; Virginia Slims; Carpet (i) – $100,000 – 33S/14D	(United States) Rosie Casals (United States) Martina Navratilova; 6–2, 6–1	(Socialist Federal Republic of Yugoslavia) Mima Jaušovec (Romania) Virginia Ruzici	(United States) Rosie Casals (Soviet Union) Olga Morozova	(United Kingdom) Virginia Wade (Australia) Margaret Court (Socialist Federal Republic of Yugoslavia) Mima Jaušovec (Soviet Union) Natasha Chmyreva
31 Jan	Virginia Slims of Seattle; Seattle, United States; Virginia Slims; Carpet (i) – $100,000 – 33S/16D	(United States) Chris Evert; 6–2, 6–4	(United States) Martina Navratilova	(Soviet Union) Olga Morozova (United States) Rosie Casals	(United States) Kristien Shaw (Australia) Dianne Fromholtz (Soviet Union) Natasha Chmyreva (United States) Sharon Walsh
31 Jan	Virginia Slims of Seattle; Seattle, United States; Virginia Slims; Carpet (i) – $100,000 – 33S/16D	(United States) Rosie Casals (United States) Chris Evert; 6–4, 3–6, 6–3	(France) Françoise Dürr (United States) Martina Navratilova	(Soviet Union) Olga Morozova (United States) Rosie Casals	(United States) Kristien Shaw (Australia) Dianne Fromholtz (Soviet Union) Natasha Chmyreva (United States) Sharon Walsh

=== February ===
Week	Tournament	Champions	Runners-up	Semifinalists	Quarterfinalists
7 Feb	Virginia Slims of Chicago; Chicago, United States; Virginia Slims; Carpet (i) – $100,000 – 33S/16D	(United States) Chris Evert; 6–1, 6–3	(Australia) Margaret Court	(Netherlands) Betty Stöve (Soviet Union) Natasha Chmyreva	(United States) Kristien Shaw (South Africa) Brigitte Cuypers (United States) Julie Anthony (United States) Rosie Casals
7 Feb	Virginia Slims of Chicago; Chicago, United States; Virginia Slims; Carpet (i) – $100,000 – 33S/16D	(United States) Rosie Casals (United States) Chris Evert; 6–3, 6–4	(Australia) Margaret Court (Netherlands) Betty Stöve	(Netherlands) Betty Stöve (Soviet Union) Natasha Chmyreva	(United States) Kristien Shaw (South Africa) Brigitte Cuypers (United States) Julie Anthony (United States) Rosie Casals
14 Feb	Virginia Slims of Los Angeles; Los Angeles, United States; Virginia Slims; Carpet (i) – $100,000 – 34S/15D	(United States) Chris Evert; 6–2, 2–6, 6–2	(United States) Martina Navratilova	(United States) Rosie Casals (Australia) Margaret Court	(Australia) Kerry Reid (United Kingdom) Virginia Wade (United States) Terry Holladay (United States) JoAnne Russell
14 Feb	Virginia Slims of Los Angeles; Los Angeles, United States; Virginia Slims; Carpet (i) – $100,000 – 34S/15D	(United States) Rosie Casals (United States) Chris Evert; 6–2, 6–4	(United States) Martina Navratilova (Netherlands) Betty Stöve	(United States) Rosie Casals (Australia) Margaret Court	(Australia) Kerry Reid (United Kingdom) Virginia Wade (United States) Terry Holladay (United States) JoAnne Russell
21 Feb	Virginia Slims of Detroit; Detroit, United States; Virginia Slims; Carpet (i) – $100,000 – 32S	(United States) Martina Navratilova; 6–4, 6–4	(United Kingdom) Sue Barker	(United Kingdom) Virginia Wade (France) Françoise Dürr	(South Africa) Yvonne Vermaak (Romania) Virginia Ruzici (Australia) Margaret Court (United States) Sharon Walsh
21 Feb	Virginia Slims of Detroit; Detroit, United States; Virginia Slims; Carpet (i) – $100,000 – 32S	(United States) Martina Navratilova (Netherlands) Betty Stöve; 6–3, 6–4	(United States) Janet Newberry (United States) JoAnne Russell	(United Kingdom) Virginia Wade (France) Françoise Dürr	(South Africa) Yvonne Vermaak (Romania) Virginia Ruzici (Australia) Margaret Court (United States) Sharon Walsh
28 Feb	Virginia Slims of San Francisco; San Francisco, United States; Virginia Slims; Carpet (i) – $100,000 – 34S/16D	(United Kingdom) Sue Barker; 6–3, 6–4	(United Kingdom) Virginia Wade	(United States) Chris Evert (United States) Rosie Casals	(Netherlands) Betty Stöve (Socialist Federal Republic of Yugoslavia) Mima Jaušovec (Australia) Kerry Reid (France) Françoise Dürr
28 Feb	Virginia Slims of San Francisco; San Francisco, United States; Virginia Slims; Carpet (i) – $100,000 – 34S/16D	(Australia) Kerry Reid (South Africa) Greer Stevens; 6–3, 6–1	(United Kingdom) Sue Barker (United States) Ann Kiyomura	(United States) Chris Evert (United States) Rosie Casals	(Netherlands) Betty Stöve (Socialist Federal Republic of Yugoslavia) Mima Jaušovec (Australia) Kerry Reid (France) Françoise Dürr

=== March ===
Week	Tournament	Champions	Runners-up	Semifinalists	Quarterfinalists
7 Mar	Virginia Slims of Dallas; Dallas, United States; Virginia Slims; Carpet (i) – $100,000 – 34S/17D	(United Kingdom) Sue Barker; 6–1, 7–6^{(5–4)}	(United States) Terry Holladay	(South Africa) Greer Stevens (United Kingdom) Virginia Wade	(United States) Kathleen Harter (Czechoslovakia) Renáta Tomanová (United States) Kristien Shaw (Netherlands) Betty Stöve
7 Mar	Virginia Slims of Dallas; Dallas, United States; Virginia Slims; Carpet (i) – $100,000 – 34S/17D	(United States) Martina Navratilova (Netherlands) Betty Stöve; 6–2, 6–4	(Australia) Kerry Reid (South Africa) Greer Stevens	(South Africa) Greer Stevens (United Kingdom) Virginia Wade	(United States) Kathleen Harter (Czechoslovakia) Renáta Tomanová (United States) Kristien Shaw (Netherlands) Betty Stöve
14 Mar	Virginia Slims of Philadelphia; Philadelphia, United States; Virginia Slims; Carpet (i) – $100,000 – 32S/15D	(United States) Chris Evert; 6–4, 4–6, 6–3	(United States) Martina Navratilova	(United Kingdom) Sue Barker (United States) Rosie Casals	(Australia) Dianne Fromholtz (Australia) Kerry Reid (United Kingdom) Virginia Wade (Netherlands) Betty Stöve
14 Mar	Virginia Slims of Philadelphia; Philadelphia, United States; Virginia Slims; Carpet (i) – $100,000 – 32S/15D	(France) Françoise Dürr (United Kingdom) Virginia Wade; 6–4, 4–6, 6–4	(United States) Martina Navratilova (Netherlands) Betty Stöve	(United Kingdom) Sue Barker (United States) Rosie Casals	(Australia) Dianne Fromholtz (Australia) Kerry Reid (United Kingdom) Virginia Wade (Netherlands) Betty Stöve
24 Mar	Virginia Slims Championships; New York City, United States; Year-end championships Carpet (i) – $150,000 – 16S (8RR)	(United States) Chris Evert; 2–6, 6–1, 6–1	(United Kingdom) Sue Barker	3rd: (United States) Martina Navratilova; 4th: (United States) Rosie Casals	5th: (United Kingdom) Virginia Wade; 6th: (Netherlands) Betty Stöve; 7th: (Socialist Federal Republic of Yugoslavia) Mima Jaušovec; 8th: (United States) Kristien Shaw
28 Mar	Family Circle Cup; Hilton Head Island, United States; Colgate Series; Clay – $110,000 – 30S/16D; Singles	(United States) Chris Evert; 6–1, 6–0	(United States) Billie Jean King	(Socialist Federal Republic of Yugoslavia) Mima Jaušovec (Australia) Kerry Reid	(United States) Kathy May (United States) Rosie Casals (United States) Tracy Austin (Czechoslovakia) Renáta Tomanová
28 Mar	Family Circle Cup; Hilton Head Island, United States; Colgate Series; Clay – $110,000 – 30S/16D; Singles	(United States) Rosie Casals (United States) Chris Evert; 6–4, 6–2	(France) Françoise Dürr (United Kingdom) Virginia Wade	(Socialist Federal Republic of Yugoslavia) Mima Jaušovec (Australia) Kerry Reid	(United States) Kathy May (United States) Rosie Casals (United States) Tracy Austin (Czechoslovakia) Renáta Tomanová

=== April ===
Week	Tournament	Champions	Runners-up	Semifinalists	Quarterfinalists
4 Apr	Bridgestone Doubles Championships; Tokyo, Japan; Carpet (i) – $100,000 – 8D	(United States) Martina Navratilova (Netherlands) Betty Stöve; 7–5, 6–3	(France) Françoise Dürr (United Kingdom) Virginia Wade	(United States) Casals / (United States) King (Socialist Federal Republic of Yugoslavia) Jaušovec / (Romania) Ruzici	(United States) Newberry / (United States) Russell (United States) Kemmer / (United States) Ziegenfuss (United Kingdom) Barker / (United States) Kiyomura (United States) Holladay / (United States) May

=== May ===
Week	Tournament	Champions	Runners-up	Semifinalists	Quarterfinalists
9 May	German Open; Hamburg, West Germany; Colgate Series; Clay – $35,000	(United States) Laura duPont; 6–1, 6–4	(West Germany) Heidi Eisterlehner	(West Germany) Katja Ebbinghaus (Czechoslovakia) Regina Maršíková	(Czechoslovakia) Renáta Tomanová (West Germany) Iris Riedel (Romania) Florența Mihai (Czechoslovakia) Lea Plchová
9 May	German Open; Hamburg, West Germany; Colgate Series; Clay – $35,000	(South Africa) Linky Boshoff (South Africa) Ilana Kloss; 2–6, 6–4, 7–5	(Czechoslovakia) Regina Maršíková (Czechoslovakia) Renáta Tomanová	(West Germany) Katja Ebbinghaus (Czechoslovakia) Regina Maršíková	(Czechoslovakia) Renáta Tomanová (West Germany) Iris Riedel (Romania) Florența Mihai (Czechoslovakia) Lea Plchová
16 May	Italian Open; Rome, Italy; Colgate Series; Clay – $35,000	(United States) Janet Newberry; 6–3, 7–6^{(7–5)}	(Czechoslovakia) Renáta Tomanová	(Hungary) Marie Pinterová (United States) Laura duPont	(Socialist Federal Republic of Yugoslavia) Mima Jaušovec (West Germany) Iris Riedel (United States) Pam Teeguarden (United States) Mary Struthers
16 May	Italian Open; Rome, Italy; Colgate Series; Clay – $35,000	(South Africa) Brigitte Cuypers (South Africa) Marise Kruger; 6–3, 5–7, 2–6	(United States) Bunny Bruning (United States) Sharon Walsh	(Hungary) Marie Pinterová (United States) Laura duPont	(Socialist Federal Republic of Yugoslavia) Mima Jaušovec (West Germany) Iris Riedel (United States) Pam Teeguarden (United States) Mary Struthers
23 May; 30 May	French Open; Paris, France; Grand Slam; Clay (red) – 64S/64Q/22D/24X; Singles – Doubles – Mixed doubles	(Socialist Federal Republic of Yugoslavia) Mima Jaušovec; 6–2, 6–7^{(5–7)}, 6–1	(Romania) Florența Mihai	(Czechoslovakia) Regina Maršíková (United States) Janet Newberry	(United States) Pam Teeguarden (Czechoslovakia) Renáta Tomanová (South Africa) Linky Boshoff (United States) Kathy May
23 May; 30 May	French Open; Paris, France; Grand Slam; Clay (red) – 64S/64Q/22D/24X; Singles – Doubles – Mixed doubles	(Czechoslovakia) Regina Maršíková (United States) Pam Teeguarden; 5–7, 6–4, 6–2	(United States) Rayni Fox (Australia) Helen Gourlay Cawley	(Czechoslovakia) Regina Maršíková (United States) Janet Newberry	(United States) Pam Teeguarden (Czechoslovakia) Renáta Tomanová (South Africa) Linky Boshoff (United States) Kathy May
23 May; 30 May	French Open; Paris, France; Grand Slam; Clay (red) – 64S/64Q/22D/24X; Singles – Doubles – Mixed doubles	(United States) Mary Carillo (United States) John McEnroe; 7–6, 6–3	(Romania) Florența Mihai (Colombia) Iván Molina	(Czechoslovakia) Regina Maršíková (United States) Janet Newberry	(United States) Pam Teeguarden (Czechoslovakia) Renáta Tomanová (South Africa) Linky Boshoff (United States) Kathy May

=== June ===
Week	Tournament	Champions	Runners-up	Semifinalists	Quarterfinalists
13 Jun	Federation Cup; Eastbourne, Great Britain; Federation Cup; Grass – 32 teams knockout	United States; 2–1	Australia	South Africa; Great Britain	France; Netherlands; Sweden; West Germany
20 Jun; 27 Jun	Wimbledon Championships; London, Great Britain; Grand Slam; Grass – 96S/48D/64X; Singles – Doubles – Mixed doubles	(United Kingdom) Virginia Wade; 4–6, 6–3, 6–1	(Netherlands) Betty Stöve	(United States) Chris Evert (United Kingdom) Sue Barker	(United States) Billie Jean King (United States) Rosie Casals (Australia) Kerry Reid (United States) Martina Navratilova
20 Jun; 27 Jun	Wimbledon Championships; London, Great Britain; Grand Slam; Grass – 96S/48D/64X; Singles – Doubles – Mixed doubles	(Australia) Helen Gourlay Cawley (United States) JoAnne Russell; 6–3, 6–3	(United States) Martina Navratilova (Netherlands) Betty Stöve	(United States) Chris Evert (United Kingdom) Sue Barker	(United States) Billie Jean King (United States) Rosie Casals (Australia) Kerry Reid (United States) Martina Navratilova
20 Jun; 27 Jun	Wimbledon Championships; London, Great Britain; Grand Slam; Grass – 96S/48D/64X; Singles – Doubles – Mixed doubles	(South Africa) Greer Stevens (South Africa) Bob Hewitt; 3–6, 7–5, 6–4	(Netherlands) Betty Stöve (South Africa) Frew McMillan	(United States) Chris Evert (United Kingdom) Sue Barker	(United States) Billie Jean King (United States) Rosie Casals (Australia) Kerry Reid (United States) Martina Navratilova

=== August ===
Week	Tournament	Champions	Runners-up	Semifinalists	Quarterfinalists
8 Aug	US Clay Court Championships; Indianapolis, United States; Colgate Series; Clay – $35,000; Singles – Doubles	(United States) Laura duPont; 6–4, 6–3	(United States) Nancy Richey	(Australia) Cynthia Doerner (West Germany) Iris Riedel	(Brazil) Maria Bueno (West Germany) Katja Ebbinghaus (United Kingdom) Lesley Charles (United States) Marcie Louie
8 Aug	US Clay Court Championships; Indianapolis, United States; Colgate Series; Clay – $35,000; Singles – Doubles	(South Africa) Linky Boshoff (South Africa) Ilana Kloss; 5–7, 7–5, 6–3	(United States) Mary Carillo (United States) Wendy Overton	(Australia) Cynthia Doerner (West Germany) Iris Riedel	(Brazil) Maria Bueno (West Germany) Katja Ebbinghaus (United Kingdom) Lesley Charles (United States) Marcie Louie
15 Aug	Rothmans Canadian Open; Toronto, Canada; Colgate Series; Clay – $35,000	(Czechoslovakia) Regina Maršíková; 6–4, 4–6, 6–2	(South Africa) Marise Kruger	(Australia) Cynthia Doerner (United States) Jeanne Evert	(West Germany) Katja Ebbinghaus (United States) Rosie Casals (South Africa) Yvonne Vermaak (Uruguay) Fiorella Bonicelli
15 Aug	Rothmans Canadian Open; Toronto, Canada; Colgate Series; Clay – $35,000	(South Africa) Linky Boshoff (South Africa) Ilana Kloss; 6–2, 6–3	(United States) Rosie Casals (Australia) Evonne Goolagong Cawley	(Australia) Cynthia Doerner (United States) Jeanne Evert	(West Germany) Katja Ebbinghaus (United States) Rosie Casals (South Africa) Yvonne Vermaak (Uruguay) Fiorella Bonicelli
22 Aug	Ivey's Pepsi Tennis Classic; Charlotte, United States; Colgate Series; Clay – $50,000	(United States) Martina Navratilova; 3–6, 6–2, 6–2	(Socialist Federal Republic of Yugoslavia) Mima Jaušovec	(United States) JoAnne Russell (Czechoslovakia) Regina Maršíková	(United States) Tracy Austin (South Africa) Brigitte Cuypers (West Germany) Katja Ebbinghaus (United States) Kate Latham
22 Aug	Ivey's Pepsi Tennis Classic; Charlotte, United States; Colgate Series; Clay – $50,000	(United States) Martina Navratilova (Netherlands) Betty Stöve; 6–3, 6–4	(Czechoslovakia) Regina Maršíková (United States) Pam Teeguarden	(United States) JoAnne Russell (Czechoslovakia) Regina Maršíková	(United States) Tracy Austin (South Africa) Brigitte Cuypers (West Germany) Katja Ebbinghaus (United States) Kate Latham
29 Aug; 5 Sep	US Open; New York City, United States; Grand Slam $250,000 – Clay – 64S/32D/32X; Singles – Doubles – Mixed doubles	(United States) Chris Evert; 7–6^{(7–3)}, 6–2	(Australia) Wendy Turnbull	(Netherlands) Betty Stöve (United States) Martina Navratilova	(United States) Billie Jean King (United States) Tracy Austin (United Kingdom) Virginia Wade (Socialist Federal Republic of Yugoslavia) Mima Jaušovec
29 Aug; 5 Sep	US Open; New York City, United States; Grand Slam $250,000 – Clay – 64S/32D/32X; Singles – Doubles – Mixed doubles	(United States) Martina Navratilova (Netherlands) Betty Stöve; 6–1, 7–6^{(7–4)}	(United States) Renée Richards (United States) Betty-Ann Stuart	(Netherlands) Betty Stöve (United States) Martina Navratilova	(United States) Billie Jean King (United States) Tracy Austin (United Kingdom) Virginia Wade (Socialist Federal Republic of Yugoslavia) Mima Jaušovec
29 Aug; 5 Sep	US Open; New York City, United States; Grand Slam $250,000 – Clay – 64S/32D/32X; Singles – Doubles – Mixed doubles	(Netherlands) Betty Stöve (South Africa) Frew McMillan; 6–2, 3–6, 6–3	(United States) Billie Jean King (United States) Vitas Gerulaitis	(Netherlands) Betty Stöve (United States) Martina Navratilova	(United States) Billie Jean King (United States) Tracy Austin (United Kingdom) Virginia Wade (Socialist Federal Republic of Yugoslavia) Mima Jaušovec

=== September ===
Week	Tournament	Champions	Runners-up	Semifinalists	Quarterfinalists
12 Sep	Toray Sillook Open; Osaka & Tokyo, Japan; Colgate Series; Carpet (i) – $100,000; Singles	(United Kingdom) Virginia Wade; 7–5, 5–7, 6–4	(United States) Martina Navratilova	(Australia) Wendy Turnbull (United Kingdom) Sue Barker	(Socialist Federal Republic of Yugoslavia) Mima Jaušovec (United States) Terry Holladay (United States) Julie Anthony (United Kingdom) Michelle Tyler
26 Sep	Florida Federal Open; Palm Harbor, United States; Colgate Series; Hard – $35,000	(Romania) Virginia Ruzici; 6–4, 4–6, 6–2	(United States) Laura duPont	(South Africa) Marise Kruger (United States) Mona Guerrant	(United Kingdom) Michelle Tyler (United States) Renée Richards (United States) Mary Hamm (United States) JoAnne Russell
26 Sep	Florida Federal Open; Palm Harbor, United States; Colgate Series; Hard – $35,000	(South Africa) Linky Boshoff (South Africa) Ilana Kloss; 6–7, 6–2, 6–2	(South Africa) Brigitte Cuypers (South Africa) Marise Kruger	(South Africa) Marise Kruger (United States) Mona Guerrant	(United Kingdom) Michelle Tyler (United States) Renée Richards (United States) Mary Hamm (United States) JoAnne Russell

=== October ===
Week	Tournament	Champions	Runners-up	Semifinalists	Quarterfinalists
3 Oct	Wyler's Classic; Atlanta, United States; Colgate Series; Carpet (i) – $75,000 – 32S/16D	(United States) Chris Evert; 6–3, 6–2	(Australia) Dianne Fromholtz	(United Kingdom) Virginia Wade (United States) Billie Jean King	(United States) Ann Kiyomura (Australia) Kerry Reid (Netherlands) Betty Stöve (United States) Martina Navratilova
3 Oct	Wyler's Classic; Atlanta, United States; Colgate Series; Carpet (i) – $75,000 – 32S/16D	(United States) Martina Navratilova (Netherlands) Betty Stöve; 6–4, 6–2	(South Africa) Brigitte Cuypers (South Africa) Marise Kruger	(United Kingdom) Virginia Wade (United States) Billie Jean King	(United States) Ann Kiyomura (Australia) Kerry Reid (Netherlands) Betty Stöve (United States) Martina Navratilova
10 Oct	Thunderbird Classic; Phoenix, United States; Colgate Series; Hard – $75,000	(United States) Billie Jean King; 1–6, 6–1, 6–0	(Australia) Wendy Turnbull	(Netherlands) Betty Stöve (United States) Martina Navratilova	(United States) Renée Richards (Australia) Dianne Fromholtz (United States) Rosie Casals (United States) Tracy Austin
10 Oct	Thunderbird Classic; Phoenix, United States; Colgate Series; Hard – $75,000	(United States) Billie Jean King (United States) Martina Navratilova; 6–0, 7–5	(Australia) Helen Gourlay Cawley (United States) JoAnne Russell	(Netherlands) Betty Stöve (United States) Martina Navratilova	(United States) Renée Richards (Australia) Dianne Fromholtz (United States) Rosie Casals (United States) Tracy Austin
17 Oct	Colgate Brazil Open; São Paulo, Brazil; Colgate Series; Hard – $75,000	(United States) Billie Jean King; 6–1, 6–4	(Netherlands) Betty Stöve	(Australia) Dianne Fromholtz (Australia) Kerry Reid	(United States) Martina Navratilova (United States) Betsy Nagelsen (United States) Rosie Casals (United States) Sharon Walsh
17 Oct	Colgate Brazil Open; São Paulo, Brazil; Colgate Series; Hard – $75,000	(Australia) Kerry Reid (Australia) Wendy Turnbull; 6–3, 5–7, 6–2	(United States) Martina Navratilova (Netherlands) Betty Stöve	(Australia) Dianne Fromholtz (Australia) Kerry Reid	(United States) Martina Navratilova (United States) Betsy Nagelsen (United States) Rosie Casals (United States) Sharon Walsh
24 Oct	Borniquen Classic; San Juan, Puerto Rico; Colgate Series; Hard – $75,000	(United States) Billie Jean King; 6–1, 6–3	(United States) Janet Newberry	(United States) JoAnne Russell (Netherlands) Betty Stöve	(Australia) Wendy Turnbull (United States) Rosie Casals (Romania) Virginia Ruzici (United States) Terry Holladay
24 Oct	Borniquen Classic; San Juan, Puerto Rico; Colgate Series; Hard – $75,000	(United States) Rosie Casals (United States) Billie Jean King; 4–6, 6–2, 6–3	(South Africa) Linky Boshoff (South Africa) Ilana Kloss	(United States) JoAnne Russell (Netherlands) Betty Stöve	(Australia) Wendy Turnbull (United States) Rosie Casals (Romania) Virginia Ruzici (United States) Terry Holladay
31 Oct	Colgate Series Championships; Palm Springs, United States; Colgate Series championships Hard – $250,000 – 8S/4D	(United States) Chris Evert; 6–2, 6–2	(United States) Billie Jean King	(United Kingdom) Virginia Wade (3rd) (Australia) Kerry Reid (4th)	Round robin (Australia) Dianne Fromholtz (United States) Martina Navratilova (Australia) Wendy Turnbull (Netherlands) Betty Stöve
31 Oct	Colgate Series Championships; Palm Springs, United States; Colgate Series championships Hard – $250,000 – 8S/4D	(France) Françoise Dürr (United Kingdom) Virginia Wade; 6–1, 4–6, 6–4	(Australia) Helen Gourlay Cawley (United States) JoAnne Russell	(United Kingdom) Virginia Wade (3rd) (Australia) Kerry Reid (4th)	Round robin (Australia) Dianne Fromholtz (United States) Martina Navratilova (Australia) Wendy Turnbull (Netherlands) Betty Stöve

=== November ===
Week	Tournament	Champions	Runners-up	Semifinalists	Quarterfinalists
7 Nov	Wightman Cup; Williamsburg, United States; Hard (i); Team event	United States; 7–0	Great Britain	N/A	N/A

== Rankings ==
Below are the 1977 WTA year-end rankings (December 31, 1977) in both singles and doubles competition:

Singles Year-end Ranking
No	Player Name	Points	1976	Change
1	Chris Evert (USA)	17.612	1	=
2	Billie Jean King (USA)	12.244	NR	NR
3	Martina Navratilova (USA)	11.881	4	+1
4	Virginia Wade (GBR)	10.185	3	-1
5	Sue Barker (GBR)	9.515	10	+5
6	Rosie Casals (USA)	7.693	6	=
7	Betty Stöve (NED)	6.617	7	=
8	Dianne Fromholtz (AUS)	6.462	5	-3
9	Wendy Turnbull (AUS)	6.326	30	+21
10	Kerry Melville (AUS)	6.061	8	-2
11	Mima Jaušovec (YUG)	5.738	11	=
12	Tracy Austin (USA)	5.065	NR	NR
13	Greer Stevens (RSA)	4.989	17	+4
14	Terry Holladay (USA)	4.313	13	-1
15	JoAnne Russell (USA)	4.244	18	+3
16	Virginia Ruzici (ROU)	3.951	26	+10
17	Kristien Shaw (USA)	3.875	32	+15
18	Janet Newberry (USA)	3.813	28	+10
19	Katja Ebbinghaus (FRG)	3.759	NR	NR
20	Regina Maršíková (TCH)	3.700	+3	23

== See also ==
- 1977 Men's Grand Prix circuit
