= Billie Jean King career statistics =

This article shows the main career statistics of former tennis player Billie Jean King.

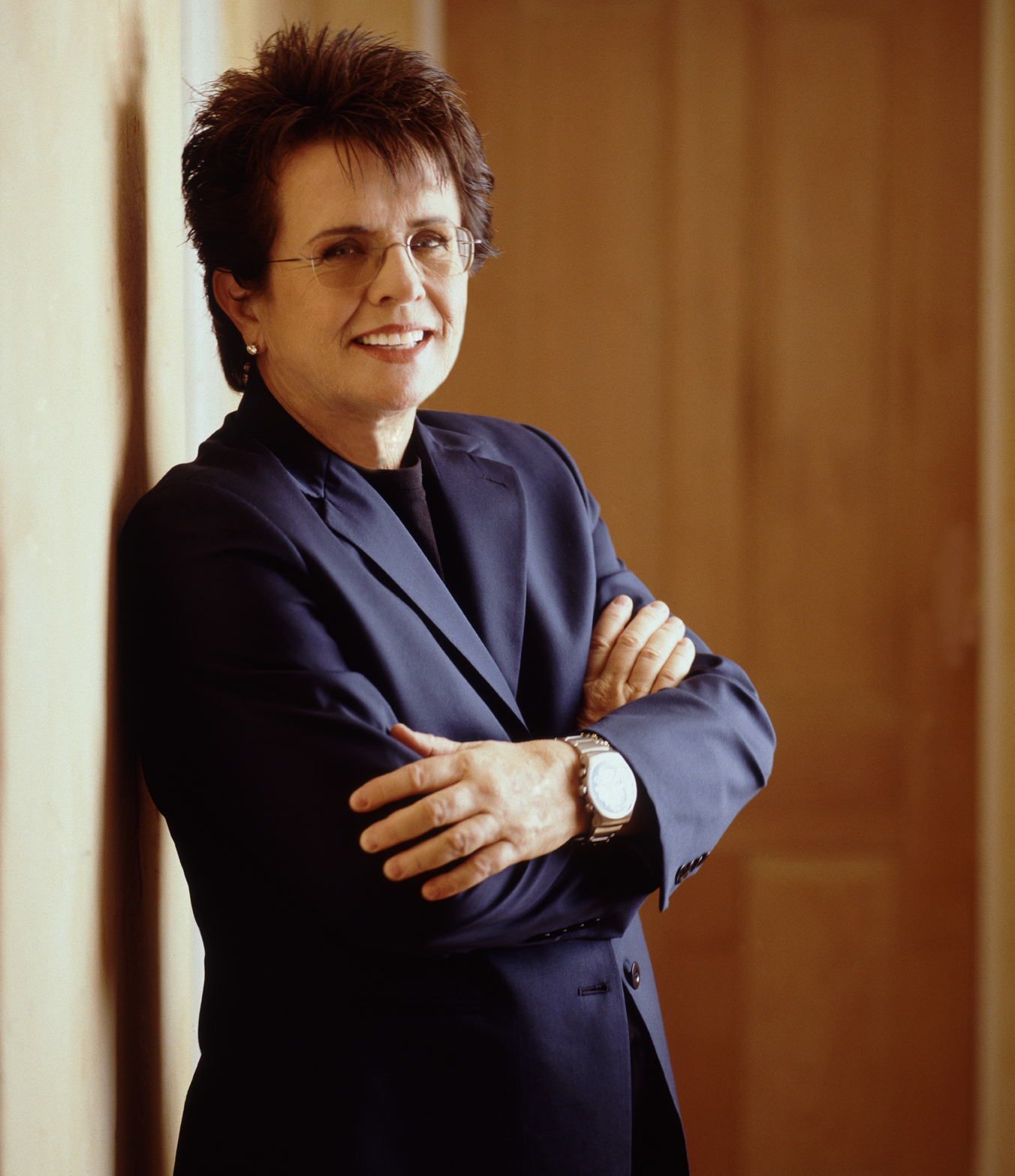
Billie Jean King

== Grand Slam finals ==
=== Singles: 18 (12 titles, 6 runners-up) ===
| Result | Year | Tournament | Surface | Opponent | Score |
|---|---|---|---|---|---|
| Loss | 1963 | Wimbledon | Grass | (Australia) Margaret Court | 3–6, 4–6 |
| Loss | 1965 | U.S. Championships | Grass | (Australia) Margaret Court | 6–8, 5–7 |
| Win | 1966 | Wimbledon | Grass | (Brazil) Maria Bueno | 6–3, 3–6, 6–1 |
| Win | 1967 | Wimbledon (2) | Grass | (United Kingdom) Ann Haydon-Jones | 6–3, 6–4 |
| Win | 1967 | U.S. Championships | Grass | (United Kingdom) Ann Haydon-Jones | 11–9, 6–4 |
| Win | 1968 | Australian Championships | Grass | (Australia) Margaret Court | 6–1, 6–2 |
↓ Open Era ↓
| Win | 1968 | Wimbledon (3) | Grass | (Australia) Judy Tegart-Dalton | 9–7, 7–5 |
| Loss | 1968 | US Open | Grass | (United Kingdom) Virginia Wade | 4–6, 2–6 |
| Loss | 1969 | Australian Open | Grass | (Australia) Margaret Court | 4–6, 1–6 |
| Loss | 1969 | Wimbledon | Grass | (United Kingdom) Ann Haydon-Jones | 6–3, 3–6, 2–6 |
| Loss | 1970 | Wimbledon | Grass | (Australia) Margaret Court | 12–14, 9–11 |
| Win | 1971 | US Open (2) | Grass | (United States) Rosemary Casals | 6–4, 7–6^{(5–2)} |
| Win | 1972 | French Open | Clay | (Australia) Evonne Goolagong | 6–3, 6–3 |
| Win | 1972 | Wimbledon (4) | Grass | (Australia) Evonne Goolagong | 6–3, 6–3 |
| Win | 1972 | US Open (3) | Grass | (Australia) Kerry Melville Reid | 6–3, 7–5 |
| Win | 1973 | Wimbledon (5) | Grass | (United States) Chris Evert | 6–0, 7–5 |
| Win | 1974 | US Open (4) | Grass | (Australia) Evonne Goolagong | 3–6, 6–3, 7–5 |
| Win | 1975 | Wimbledon (6) | Grass | (Australia) Evonne Goolagong Cawley | 6–0, 6–1 |

=== Doubles: 29 (16 titles, 13 runners-up) ===
| Result | Year | Championship | Surface | Partner | Opponents | Score |
|---|---|---|---|---|---|---|
| Win | 1961 | Wimbledon | Grass | (United States) Karen Hantze Susman | (Australia) Jan Lehane (Australia) Margaret Court | 6–3, 6–4 |
| Win | 1962 | Wimbledon (2) | Grass | (United States) Karen Hantze Susman | (South Africa) Sandra Reynolds Price (South Africa) Renée Schuurman | 5–7, 6–3, 7–5 |
| Loss | 1962 | U.S. Championships | Grass | (United States) Karen Hantze Susman | (Brazil) Maria Bueno (United States) Darlene Hard | 6–4, 3–6, 2–6 |
| Loss | 1964 | Wimbledon | Grass | (United States) Karen Hantze Susman | (Australia) Margaret Court (Australia) Lesley Turner Bowrey | 5–7, 2–6 |
| Win | 1964 | U.S. Championships | Grass | (United States) Karen Hantze Susman | (Australia) Margaret Court (Australia) Lesley Turner Bowrey | 3–6, 6–2, 6–4 |
| Loss | 1965 | Australian Championships | Grass | (Australia) Robyn Ebbern | (Australia) Margaret Court (Australia) Lesley Turner Bowrey | 6–1, 2–6, 3–6 |
| Win | 1965 | Wimbledon (3) | Grass | (Brazil) Maria Bueno | (France) Françoise Dürr (France) Janine Lieffrig | 6–2, 7–5 |
| Loss | 1965 | U.S. Championships (2) | Grass | (United States) Karen Hantze Susman | (United States) Carole Caldwell Graebner (United States) Nancy Richey Gunter | 4–6, 4–6 |
| Loss | 1966 | U.S. Championships (3) | Grass | (United States) Rosemary Casals | (Brazil) Maria Bueno (United States) Nancy Richey Gunter | 3–6, 4–6 |
| Win | 1967 | Wimbledon (4) | Grass | (United States) Rosemary Casals | (Brazil) Maria Bueno (United States) Nancy Richey Gunter | 9–11, 6–4, 6–2 |
| Win | 1967 | U.S. Championships (2) | Grass | (United States) Rosemary Casals | (United States) Mary Ann Eisel Curtis (United States) Donna Floyd Fales | 4–6, 6–3, 6–4 |
↓ Open Era ↓
| Loss | 1968 | French Open | Clay | (United States) Rosemary Casals | (France) Françoise Dürr (United Kingdom) Ann Haydon-Jones | 5–7, 6–4, 4–6 |
| Win | 1968 | Wimbledon (5) | Grass | (United States) Rosemary Casals | (France) Françoise Dürr (United Kingdom) Ann Haydon-Jones | 3–6, 6–4, 7–5 |
| Loss | 1968 | US Open (4) | Grass | (United States) Rosemary Casals | (Brazil) Maria Bueno (Australia) Margaret Court | 6–4, 7–9, 6–8 |
| Loss | 1969 | Australian Open (2) | Grass | (United States) Rosemary Casals | (Australia) Margaret Court (Australia) Lesley Turner Bowrey | 4–6, 4–6 |
| Loss | 1970 | French Open (2) | Clay | (United States) Rosemary Casals | (France) Françoise Dürr (France) Gail Sherriff Chanfreau | 1–6, 6–3, 3–6 |
| Win | 1970 | Wimbledon (6) | Grass | (United States) Rosemary Casals | (France) Françoise Dürr (United Kingdom) Virginia Wade | 6–2, 6–3 |
| Win | 1971 | Wimbledon (7) | Grass | (United States) Rosemary Casals | (Australia) Margaret Court (Australia) Evonne Goolagong Cawley | 6–3, 6–2 |
| Win | 1972 | French Open | Clay | (Netherlands) Betty Stöve | (United Kingdom) Winnie Shaw (United Kingdom) Nell Truman | 6–1, 6–2 |
| Win | 1972 | Wimbledon (8) | Grass | (Netherlands) Betty Stöve | (Australia) Judy Tegart-Dalton (France) Françoise Dürr | 6–2, 4–6, 6–3 |
| Win | 1973 | Wimbledon (9) | Grass | (United States) Rosemary Casals | (France) Françoise Dürr (Netherlands) Betty Stöve | 6–1, 4–6, 7–5 |
| Loss | 1973 | US Open (5) | Grass | (United States) Rosemary Casals | (Australia) Margaret Court (United Kingdom) Virginia Wade | 6–3, 3–6, 5–7 |
| Win | 1974 | US Open (3) | Grass | (United States) Rosemary Casals | (France) Françoise Dürr (Netherlands) Betty Stöve | 7–6, 6–7, 6–4 |
| Loss | 1975 | US Open (6) | Clay | (United States) Rosemary Casals | (Australia) Margaret Court (United Kingdom) Virginia Wade | 5–7, 6–2, 6–7 |
| Loss | 1976 | Wimbledon (2) | Grass | (Netherlands) Betty Stöve | (United States) Chris Evert (United States) Martina Navratilova | 1–6, 6–3, 5–7 |
| Win | 1978 | US Open (4) | Hard | (United States) Martina Navratilova | (Australia) Kerry Melville Reid (Australia) Wendy Turnbull | 7–6, 6–4 |
| Win | 1979 | Wimbledon (10) | Hard | (United States) Martina Navratilova | (Netherlands) Betty Stöve (Australia) Wendy Turnbull | 5–7, 6–3, 6–2 |
| Loss | 1979 | US Open (7) | Hard | (United States) Martina Navratilova | (Netherlands) Betty Stöve (Australia) Wendy Turnbull | 5–7, 3–6 |
| Win | 1980 | US Open (5) | Hard | (United States) Martina Navratilova | (United States) Pam Shriver (Netherlands) Betty Stöve | 7–6, 7–5 |

=== Mixed doubles: 18 (11 titles, 7 runners-up) ===
By winning the 1968 Australian Championships title, King became the 7th player to complete the mixed doubles career Grand Slam.

| Result | Year | Championship | Surface | Partner | Opponents | Score |
|---|---|---|---|---|---|---|
| Loss | 1966 | Wimbledon | Grass | (United States) Dennis Ralston | (Australia) Margaret Court (Australia) Ken Fletcher | 6–4, 3–6, 3–6 |
| Win | 1967 | French Championships | Clay | (Australia) Owen Davidson | (United Kingdom) Ann Haydon-Jones (Romania) Ion Țiriac | 6–3, 6–1 |
| Win | 1967 | Wimbledon | Grass | (Australia) Owen Davidson | (Brazil) Maria Bueno (Australia) Ken Fletcher | 7–5, 6–2 |
| Win | 1967 | U.S. Championships | Grass | (Australia) Owen Davidson | (United States) Rosemary Casals (United States) Stan Smith | 6–3, 6–2 |
| Win | 1968 | Australian Championships | Grass | (Australia) Dick Crealy | (Australia) Margaret Court (Australia) Allan Stone | walkover |
↓ Open Era ↓
| Loss | 1968 | French Open | Clay | (Australia) Owen Davidson | (France) Françoise Dürr (France) Jean-Claude Barclay | 1–6, 4–6 |
| Win | 1970 | French Open (2) | Clay | (South Africa) Bob Hewitt | (France) Françoise Dürr (France) Jean-Claude Barclay | 3–6, 6–4, 6–2 |
| Win | 1971 | Wimbledon (2) | Grass | (Australia) Owen Davidson | (Australia) Margaret Court (United States) Marty Riessen | 3–6, 6–2, 15–13 |
| Win | 1971 | US Open (2) | Grass | (Australia) Owen Davidson | (Netherlands) Betty Stöve (France) Rob Maud | 6–3, 7–5 |
| Win | 1973 | Wimbledon (3) | Grass | (Australia) Owen Davidson | (United States) Janet Newberry (Mexico) Raúl Ramírez | 6–3, 6–2 |
| Win | 1973 | US Open (3) | Grass | (Australia) Owen Davidson | (Australia) Margaret Court (United States) Marty Riessen | 6–3, 3–6, 7–6 |
| Win | 1974 | Wimbledon (4) | Grass | (Australia) Owen Davidson | (United Kingdom) Lesley Charles (United Kingdom) Mark Farrell | 6–3, 9–7 |
| Loss | 1975 | US Open | Clay | (Australia) Fred Stolle | (United States) Rosemary Casals (United States) Richard Stockton | 3–6, 6–7 |
| Win | 1976 | US Open (4) | Clay | (Australia) Phil Dent | (Netherlands) Betty Stöve (South Africa) Frew McMillan | 3–6, 6–2, 7–5 |
| Loss | 1977 | US Open (2) | Clay | (United States) Vitas Gerulaitis | (Netherlands) Betty Stöve (South Africa) Frew McMillan | 2–6, 6–3, 3–6 |
| Loss | 1978 | Wimbledon (2) | Grass | (Australia) Ray Ruffels | (Netherlands) Betty Stöve (South Africa) Frew McMillan | 2–6, 2–6 |
| Loss | 1978 | US Open (3) | Hard | (Australia) Ray Ruffels | (Netherlands) Betty Stöve (South Africa) Frew McMillan | 3–6, 6–7 |
| Loss | 1983 | Wimbledon (3) | Grass | (United States) Steve Denton | (Australia) Wendy Turnbull (United Kingdom) John Lloyd | 7–6^{(7–5)}, 6–7^{(5–7)}, 5–7 |

== Grand Slam tournament timelines ==
Key
| W | F | SF | QF | #R | RR | Q# | DNQ | A | NH |

(W) winner; (F) finalist; (SF) semifinalist; (QF) quarterfinalist; (#R) rounds 4, 3, 2, 1; (RR) round-robin stage; (Q#) qualification round; (DNQ) did not qualify; (A) absent; (NH) not held; (SR) strike rate (events won / competed); (W–L) win–loss record.

=== Singles ===
| Tournament | '59 | '60 | '61 | '62 | '63 | '64 | '65 | '66 | '67 | '68 | '69 | '70 | '71 | '72 | '73 | '74 | '75 | '76 | '77 | '78 | '79 | '80 | '81 | '82 | '83 | '84 | SR | W–L |
|---|---|---|---|---|---|---|---|---|---|---|---|---|---|---|---|---|---|---|---|---|---|---|---|---|---|---|---|---|
| Australian Open | A | A | A | A | A | A | SF | A | A | W | F | A | A | A | A | A | A | A | A/A | A | A | A | A | QF | 2R | A | 1 / 5 | 16–4 |
| French Open | A | A | A | A | A | A | A | A | QF | SF | QF | QF | A | W | A | A | A | A | A | A | A | QF | A | 3R | A | A | 1 / 7 | 21–6 |
| Wimbledon | A | A | 2R | QF | F | SF | SF | W | W | W | F | F | SF | W | W | QF | W | A | QF | QF | QF | QF | A | SF | SF | A | 6 / 21 | 95–15 |
| US Open | 1R | 3R | 2R | 1R | 4R | QF | F | 2R | W | F | QF | A | W | W | 3R | W | A | A | QF | A | SF | A | A | 1R | A | A | 4 / 18 | 58–14 |
| SR | 0 / 1 | 0 / 1 | 0 / 2 | 0 / 2 | 0 / 2 | 0 / 2 | 0 / 3 | 1 / 2 | 2 / 3 | 2 / 4 | 0 / 4 | 0 / 2 | 1 / 2 | 3 / 3 | 1 / 2 | 1 / 2 | 1 / 1 | 0 / 0 | 0 / 2 | 0 / 1 | 0 / 2 | 0 / 2 | 0 / 0 | 0 / 4 | 0 / 2 | 0 / 0 | 12 / 51 | 190–39 |

Note: The Australian Open was held twice in 1977, in January and December.

See also

- Singles performance timelines for all female tennis players who reached at least one Grand Slam or Olympic final

=== Women's doubles ===
| Tournament | '59 | '60 | '61 | '62 | '63 | '64 | '65 | '66 | '67 | '68 | '69 | '70 | '71 | '72 | '73 | '74 | '75 | '76 | '77 | '78 | '79 | '80 | '81 | '82 | '83 | '84 | SR |
|---|---|---|---|---|---|---|---|---|---|---|---|---|---|---|---|---|---|---|---|---|---|---|---|---|---|---|---|
| Australian Open | A | A | A | A | A | A | F | A | A | SF | F | A | A | A | A | A | A | A | A/A | A | A | A | A | SF | SF | A | 0 / 5 |
| French Open | A | A | A | A | A | A | A | A | QF | F | QF | F | A | W | A | A | A | A | A | A | A | 1R | QF | A | A | A | 1 / 7 |
| Wimbledon | A | A | W | W | 2R | F | W | QF | W | W | 3R | W | W | W | W | QF | SF | F | 2R | QF | W | SF | A | 2R | 3R | A | 10 / 22 |
| US Open | A | A | A | F | QF | W | F | F | W | F | SF | A | A | SF | F | W | F | QF | QF | W | F | W | A | 3R | SF | QF | 5 / 20 |
| SR | 0 / 0 | 0 / 0 | 1 / 1 | 1 / 2 | 0 / 2 | 1 / 2 | 1 / 3 | 0 / 2 | 2 / 3 | 1 / 4 | 0 / 4 | 1 / 2 | 1 / 1 | 2 / 3 | 1 / 2 | 1 / 2 | 0 / 2 | 0 / 2 | 0 / 2 | 1 / 2 | 1 / 2 | 1 / 3 | 0 / 1 | 0 / 3 | 0 / 3 | 0 / 1 | 16 / 54 |

Note: The Australian Open was held twice in 1977, in January and December.

=== Mixed doubles ===
| Tournament | '59 | '60 | '61 | '62 | '63 | '64 | '65 | '66 | '67 | '68 | '69 | '70 | '71 | '72 | '73 | '74 | '75 | '76 | '77 | '78 | '79 | '80 | '81 | '82 | '83 | '84 | SR |
|---|---|---|---|---|---|---|---|---|---|---|---|---|---|---|---|---|---|---|---|---|---|---|---|---|---|---|---|
| Australian Open | A | A | A | A | A | A | QF | A | A | W | SF | NH | NH | NH | NH | NH | NH | NH | NH/NH | NH | NH | NH | NH | NH | NH | NH | 1 / 3 |
| French Open | A | A | A | A | A | A | A | A | W | F | SF | W | A | QF | A | A | A | A | A | A | A | A | 2R | A | A | A | 2 / 6 |
| Wimbledon | A | A | 1R | A | A | 2R | A | F | W | SF | QF | 3R | W | SF | W | W | 3R | 2R | SF | F | 3R | QF | A | 3R | F | A | 4 / 19 |
| US Open | 1R | SF | A | 2R | SF | QF | A | A | W | A | 3R | A | W | SF | W | SF | F | W | F | F | 2R | A | A | 2R | 2R | 3R | 4 / 19 |
| SR | 0 / 1 | 0 / 1 | 0 / 1 | 0 / 1 | 0 / 1 | 0 / 2 | 0 / 1 | 0 / 1 | 3 / 3 | 1 / 3 | 0 / 4 | 1 / 2 | 2 / 2 | 0 / 3 | 2 / 2 | 1 / 2 | 0 / 2 | 1 / 2 | 0 / 2 | 0 / 2 | 0 / 2 | 0 / 1 | 0 / 1 | 0 / 2 | 0 / 2 | 0 / 1 | 11 / 47 |

Note: The Australian Open was held twice in 1977, in January and December.

== Grand Slam singles records ==
=== Australian Championships/Open ===
King's overall win–loss record at the Australian Championships/Open was 16–4 .800 in 5 years (1965, 1968, 1969, 1982, 1983). (Her win total does not include any first round byes.)

King was 1–1 in finals, 2–1 in semifinals, and 3–1 in quarterfinals.

King was 5–1 in three set matches, 11–3 in two set matches, and 1–0 in deuce third sets, i.e., sets that were tied 5–5 before being resolved.

King was seeded all 5 years she entered the tournament.

- Seeded #1 overall in 1969 (losing finalist), 1968 (champion).
- Seeded #2 foreign in 1965 (semifinalist).
- Seeded #7 overall in 1983 (lost 2nd round).
- Seeded #9 overall in 1982 (quarterfinalist).

King was 6–3 .667 against seeded players and 10–1 .909 against unseeded players.

- Versus #1 seeds (domestic, foreign, or overall), King was 0–1 (Margaret Court (1965)).
- Versus #2 seeds (domestic, foreign, or overall), King was 0–2 (Chris Evert 1982, Margaret Court (1969)).
- Versus #3 seeds (domestic, foreign, or overall), King was 2–0 (Ann Haydon-Jones (1969), Judy Tegart-Dalton (1968)).
- Versus #4 seeds (domestic, foreign, or overall), King was 1–0 (Robyn Ebbern (1965)).
- Versus #6 seeds (domestic, foreign, or overall), King was 1–0 (Karen Krantzcke (1969)).
- Versus #7 seeds (domestic, foreign, or overall), King was 2–0 (Barbara Potter (1982), Margaret Court (1968)).

Against her major rivals at the Australian Championships/Open, King was 1–0 versus Kerry Melville Reid, 1–0 versus Judy Tegart-Dalton, 1–0 versus Evonne Goolagong Cawley, 1–0 versus Ann Haydon-Jones, 1–2 versus Margaret Court, and 0–1 versus Chris Evert.

=== French Championships/Open ===
King's overall win–loss record at the French Championships/Open was 22–6 .786 in 7 years (1967–1970, 1972, 1980, 1982). (Her win total does not include any first round byes but does include one walkover.)

King was 1–0 in finals, 1–1 in semifinals, and 2–4 in quarterfinals. She failed to reach the quarterfinals only once, in 1982 when she lost to Lucia Romanov in the third round.

King was 3–3 in three set matches, 19–3 in two set matches, and 1–0 in deuce third sets, i.e., sets that were tied 5–5 before being resolved.

King was seeded all 7 years she entered the tournament.

- Seeded #1 in 1968 (semifinalist), 1967 (quarterfinalist).
- Seeded #2 in 1980 (quarterfinalist), 1970 (quarterfinalist), 1969 (quarterfinalist).
- Seeded #3 in 1972 (champion).
- Seeded #10 in 1982 (lost third round).

King was 5–3 .625 against seeded players and 17–3 .850 against unseeded players.

- Versus #1 seeds, King was 1–0 (Evonne Goolagong Cawley (1972)).
- Versus #5 seeds, King was 0–2 (Dianne Fromholtz Balestrat (1980), Nancy Richey Gunter (1968)).
- Versus #6 seeds, King was 1–0 (Virginia Wade (1972)).
- Versus #7 seeds, King was 1–1 (win: Helga Niessen Masthoff (1972); loss: Helga Niessen Masthoff (1970)).
- Versus #8 seeds, King was 1–0 (Maria Bueno (1968)).
- Versus #16 seeds, King was 1–0 (Gail Sheriff Chanfreau Lovera (1967)).

Against her major rivals at the French Championships/Open, King was 1–0 versus Virginia Wade, 1–0 versus Maria Bueno, 1–0 versus Evonne Goolagong Cawley, 1–1 versus Helga Niessen Masthoff, 0–1 versus Lesley Turner Bowrey, and 0–1 versus Nancy Richey Gunter.

=== Wimbledon ===
King's overall win–loss record at Wimbledon was 96–15 .865 in 21 years (1961–1975, 1977–1980, 1982–1983). (Her win total includes one walkover but does not include any first round byes.)

King was 6–3 in finals, 9–5 in semifinals, and 14–6 in quarterfinals. King failed to reach the quarterfinals only once, in 1961 during her first Wimbledon. After receiving a bye during the first round, King lost to the fifth seed, Yola Ramírez Ochoa, in the second round.

King was 23–7 in three set matches, 73–8 in two set matches, and 5–1 in deuce third sets, i.e., sets that were tied 5–5 before being resolved.

King was seeded 18 times out of 21 years. (Wimbledon seeded 8 players from at least 1961 through 1976, 12 players in 1977, and 16 players from 1978 through the end of King's career.)

- Seeded #1 in 1974 (quarterfinalist), 1968 (champion), 1967 (champion).
- Seeded #2 in 1973 (champion), 1972 (champion), 1971 (semifinalist), 1970 (losing finalist), 1969 (losing finalist).
- Seeded #3 in 1975 (champion) and 1964 (semifinalist).
- Seeded #4 in 1966 (champion).
- Seeded #5 in 1980 (quarterfinalist), 1978 (quarterfinalist), 1977 (quarterfinalist), 1965 (semifinalist).
- Seeded #7 in 1979 (quarterfinalist).
- Seeded #10 in 1983 (semifinalist).
- Seeded #12 in 1982 (semifinalist).
- Unseeded in 1963 (losing finalist), 1962 (quarterfinalist), 1961 (lost second round).

King was 31–15 .674 against seeded players. She never lost to an unseeded player (65–0). Her worst loss was to #8 seed Olga Morozova in 1974.

- Versus #1 seeds, King was 4–7 (wins: Chris Evert (1975), Evonne Goolagong Cawley (1972), Margaret Court (1966, 1962); losses: Martina Navratilova (1980), Chris Evert (1978, 1977), Margaret Court (1970, 1964, 1963), Maria Bueno (1965)).
- Versus #2 seeds, King was 2–1 (wins: Maria Bueno (1966), Lesley Turner Bowrey (1963); loss: Chris Evert (1982)).
- Versus #3 seeds, King was 6–2 (wins: Tracy Austin (1982), Evonne Goolagong Cawley (1973), Virginia Wade (1970), Ann Haydon-Jones (1967, 1963), Lesley Turner Bowrey (1965); losses: Andrea Jaeger (1983), Evonne Goolagong Cawley (1971)).
- Versus #4 seeds, King was 3–2 (wins: Evonne Goolagong Cawley (1975), Chris Evert (1973), Ann Haydon-Jones (1968); losses: Tracy Austin (1979), Ann Haydon-Jones (1969)).
- Versus #5 seeds, King was 0–2 (Ann Haydon-Jones (1962), Yola Ramírez Ochoa (1961)).
- Versus #6 seeds, King was 4–0 (Wendy Turnbull (1982), Rosemary Casals (1972), Annette Van Zyl DuPlooy (1966), Ann Haydon-Jones (1964)).
- Versus #7 seeds, King was 8–0 (Wendy Turnbull (1983), Olga Morozova (1975), Kerry Melville Reid (1973), Virginia Wade (1972), Françoise Dürr (1971), Karen Krantzcke (1970), Judy Tegart-Dalton (1968), Maria Bueno (1963)).
- Versus #8 seeds, King was 3–1 (wins: Judy Tegart-Dalton (1969), Lesley Turner Bowrey (1968), Virginia Wade (1967); loss: Olga Morozova (1974)).
- Versus #14 seeds, King was 1–0 (Sue Barker (1978)).

Against her major rivals at Wimbledon, King was 4–2 versus Ann Haydon-Jones, 3–0 versus Rosemary Casals, 3–0 versus Virginia Wade, 3–0 versus Françoise Dürr, 3–1 versus Evonne Goolagong Cawley, 3–1 versus Maria Bueno, 2–3 versus Margaret Court, 2–3 versus Chris Evert, 1–0 versus Christine Truman Janes, 1–0 versus Hana Mandlíková, 1–1 versus Olga Morozova, 1–1 versus Tracy Austin, and 0–1 versus Martina Navratilova.

=== US Championships/Open ===
King's overall win–loss record at the United States Championships/Open was 58–14 .806 in 18 years (1959–1969, 1971–1974, 1977, 1979, 1982). She was 50–11 on grass, 5–2 on hard courts, and 3–1 on clay. (Her win total does not include any first round byes. Her loss total includes two retirements.)

King was 4–2 in finals, 6–1 in semifinals, and 7–3 in quarterfinals.

King was 8–4 in three set matches, 50–10 in two set matches, and 4–1 in deuce third sets, i.e., sets that were tied 5–5 before being resolved.

King was seeded 14 times out of the 18 years she entered the tournament.

- Seeded #1 in 1973 (lost third round), 1972 (champion), 1971 (champion), 1968 (losing finalist), 1967 (champion).
- Seeded #2 in 1974 (champion), 1966 (lost second round).
- Seeded #3 in 1969 (quarterfinalist), 1964 (quarterfinalist), 1963 (lost fourth round).
- Seeded #5 in 1965 (losing finalist).
- Seeded #7 in 1977 (quarterfinalist).
- Seeded #9 in 1979 (semifinalist).
- Seeded #12 in 1982 (lost first round).
- Unseeded in 1962 (lost first round), 1961 (lost second round), 1960 (lost third round), 1959 (lost first round).

King was 12–8 .600 against seeded players and 46–6 .895 against unseeded players.

- Versus #1 seeds, King was 0–3 (Chris Evert (1979 and 1977), Margaret Court (1965)).
- Versus #2 seeds, King was 3–0 (Rosemary Casals (1971), Ann Haydon-Jones (1967), Maria Bueno 1965).
- Versus #3 seeds, King was 1–0 (Ann Haydon-Jones (1965)).
- Versus #4 seeds, King was 1–1 (win: Virginia Wade (1979); loss: Christine Truman Janes (1961)).
- Versus #5 seeds, King was 3–1 (wins: Evonne Goolagong Cawley (1974), Margaret Court (1972), Maria Bueno (1968); loss: Nancy Richey Gunter (1964)).
- Versus #6 seeds, King was 1–2 (win: Rosemary Casals (1974); losses: Nancy Richey Gunter (1969), Virginia Wade (1968)).
- Versus #7 seeds, King was 0–1 (Bernice Carr Vukovich (1960)).
- Versus #8 seeds, King was 1–0 (Virginia Wade (1972)).
- Versus #9 seeds, King was 2–0 (Kerry Melville Reid (1977 and 1972)).

Against her major rivals at the United States Championships/Open, King was 3–1 versus Virginia Wade, 2–0 versus Maria Bueno, 2–0 versus Ann Haydon-Jones, 2–0 versus Rosemary Casals, 1–0 versus Evonne Goolagong Cawley, 1–0 versus Françoise Dürr, 1–1 versus Margaret Court, 1–2 versus Chris Evert, 0–1 versus Christine Truman Janes, and 0–2 versus Nancy Richey Gunter.

== Career finals ==
=== Singles (183) ===
==== Wins (129) ====
| No. | Week of | Tournament Name and location | Surface | Opponent | Score |
|---|---|---|---|---|---|
| 1. | August 7, 1960 | Philadelphia and District Women's Grass Court Championships, Pennsylvania, U.S. | Grass | Carole Caldwell Graebner | 6–1, 6–0 |
| 2. | July 24, 1961 | Pennsylvania Lawn Tennis Championships, Merion, U.S. | Grass | Justina Bricka | 6–3, 6–4 |
| 3. | July 31, 1961 | Philadelphia and District Women's Grass Court Championships, Pennsylvania, U.S. (2) | Grass | Edda Buding | 6–3, 6–4 |
| 4. | April 3, 1962 | Pasadena Metropolitan Tournament, Pasadena, California, U.S. | Hard | Carole Caldwell Graebner (2) | 6–3, 3–6, 9–7 |
| 5. | April 1, 1963 | Pasadena Metropolitan Tournament, Pasadena, California, U.S. (2) | Hard | Patricia Cody | 6–2, 6–2 |
| 6. | May 6, 1963 | Southern California Championships, Los Angeles, U.S. | Hard | Darlene Hard | 6–4, 6–3 |
| 7. | July 8, 1963 | IIrish Lawn Tennis Championships, Dublin | Grass | Carole Caldwell Graebner (3) | 6–4, 6–3 |
| 8. | February 17, 1964 | University of Arizona Invitational Tennis Tournament, Tucson, U.S. | Hard | Victoria Palmer | 2–6, 6–1, 6–0 |
| 9. | April 20, 1964 | Ojai Valley Tournament, Ojai, California, U.S. | Hard | Julie Heldman | 3–6, 6–1, 6–4 |
| 10. | July 27, 1964 | Eastern Grass Court Championships, South Orange, New Jersey, U.S. | Grass | Nancy Richey Gunter | 7–5, 3–6, 8–6 |
| 11. | August 10, 1964 | Essex County Club Invitational, Manchester-by-the-Sea, Massachusetts, U.S. | Grass | Karen Hantze Susman | 6–4, 4–6, 11–9 |
| 12. | April 19, 1965 | Ojai Valley Tournament, Ojai, California, U.S. (2) | Hard | Kathleen Harter | 6–4, 6–2 |
| 13. | May 3, 1965 | Southern California Championships, Los Angeles, U.S. (2) | Hard | Kathleen Harter (2) | 6–3, 6–1 |
| 14. | May 17, 1965 | California State Championships, Portola Valley, U.S. | Hard | Rosemary Casals | 6–2, 8–6 |
| 15. | July 19, 1965 | Pennsylvania Lawn Tennis Championships, Merion, U.S. (2) | Grass | Carole Caldwell Graebner (4) | 6–1, 6–2 |
| 16. | July 26, 1965 | Eastern Grass Court Championships, South Orange, New Jersey, U.S. (2) | Grass | Jane Albert | 7–5, 6–3 |
| 17. | August 15, 1965 | Essex County Club Invitational, Manchester-by-the-Sea, Massachusetts, U.S. (2) | Grass | Carol Hanks Aucamp | 6–3, 10–8 |
| 18. | February 14, 1966 | U.S. Indoor Championships, Chestnut Hill, Massachusetts, U.S. | Indoor | Mary-Ann Eisel | 6–0, 6–2 |
| 19. | March 14, 1966 | Thunderbird Invitational Tennis Tournament, Phoenix, Arizona, U.S. | Hard | Mary-Ann Eisel (2) | 6–3, 6–2 |
| 20. | March 28, 1966 | South African Tennis Championships, Johannesburg | Hard | Margaret Court | 6–3, 6–2 |
| 21. | April 18, 1966 | Ojai Valley Tournament, Ojai, California, U.S. (3) | Hard | Rosemary Casals (2) | 6–2, 6–4 |
| 22. | May 2, 1966 | Southern California Championships, Los Angeles, U.S. (3) | Hard | Tory Ann Fretz | 6–3, 10–8 |
| 23. | May 16, 1966 | U.S. Hard Court Championships, La Jolla, California, U.S. | Hard | Patti Hogan | 7–5, 6–0 |
| 24. | May 23, 1966 | Tulsa Invitational Tennis Championship, Tulsa, Oklahoma, U.S. | Clay | Carol Hanks Aucamp (2) | 6–0, 6–1 |
| 25. | May 30, 1966 | Northern Championships, Manchester, United Kingdom | Grass | Winnie Shaw | 6–2, 6–1 |
| 26. | June 20, 1966 | Wimbledon, London | Grass | Maria Bueno | 6–3, 3–6, 6–1 |
| 27. | August 8, 1966 | Piping Rock Invitational, Locust Valley, New York, U.S. | Grass | Karen Krantzcke | 6–2, 6–0 |
| 28. | February 13, 1967 | U.S. Indoor Championships, Winchester, Massachusetts, U.S. (2) | Indoor | Trudy Groenman Walhof | 6–1, 6–0 |
| 29. | February 27, 1967 | Pacific Coast Indoor Tennis Championships, San Rafael, California, U.S. | Indoor | Patti Hogan (2) | 10–8, 7–5 |
| 30. | March 20, 1967 | South African Tennis Championships, Johannesburg (2) | Hard | Maria Bueno (2) | 7–5, 5–7, 6–2 |
| 31. | May 1, 1967 | California State Championships, Portola Valley, U.S. (2) | Hard | Rosemary Casals (3) | 6–1, 6–3 |
| 32. | May 8, 1967 | Charlotte Invitation Tennis Tournament, Charlotte, North Carolina, U.S. | Clay | Peaches Bartkowicz | 6–1, 6–2 |
| 33. | June 26, 1967 | Wimbledon, London (2) | Grass | Ann Haydon-Jones | 6–3, 6–4 |
| 34. | July 31, 1967 | Eastern Grass Court Championships, South Orange, New Jersey, U.S. (3) | Grass | Kathleen Harter (3) | 4–6, 6–2, 6–3 |
| 35. | August 14, 1967 | Essex County Club Invitational, Manchester-by-the-Sea, Massachusetts, U.S. (3) | Grass | Kerry Melville Reid | 8–6, 6–1 |
| 36. | August 28, 1967 | U.S. Championships, New York City | Grass | Ann Haydon-Jones (2) | 11–9, 6–4 |
| 37. | September 18, 1967 | Pacific Southwest Championships, Los Angeles, U.S. | Hard | Rosemary Casals (4) | 6–0, 6–4 |
| 38. | October 30, 1967 | South American and Argentine Tennis Championships, Buenos Aires, Argentina | Clay | Rosemary Casals (5) | 6–3, 3–6, 6–2 |
| 39. | November 27, 1967 | Victorian Championships, Melbourne | Grass | Lesley Turner Bowrey | 6–3, 3–6, 7–5 |
| 40. | January 1, 1968 | Western Australian Championships, Perth | Grass | Margaret Court (2) | 6–2, 6–4 |
| 41. | January 8, 1968 | Tasmanian Championships, Hobart, Australia | Grass | Judy Tegart-Dalton | 6–2, 6–4 |
| 42. | January 15, 1968 | Australian Championships, Melbourne, Australia | Grass | Lesley Turner Bowrey (2) | 6–3, 3–6, 7–5 |
| 43. | February 12, 1968 | New England Women's Invitational Indoor Tennis Championships, Salem, Massachusetts, U.S. | Indoor | Mary-Ann Eisel (3) | 6–3, 6–4 |
| 44. | February 19, 1968 | U.S. Indoor Championships, Winchester, Massachusetts, U.S. (3) | Indoor | Rosemary Casals (6) | 6–3, 9–7 |
| 45. | February 26, 1968 | Long Island Indoor (round robin), Brookville, New York, U.S. | Indoor | Rosemary Casals (7); Mary-Ann Eisel (4) | 31–20; 31–25 |
| 46. | April 8, 1968 | National Tennis League Professional Tour, Cannes, France | Indoor | Rosemary Casals (8) | 10–6 |
| 47. | April 15, 1968 | National Tennis League Professional Tour, Paris | ??? | Ann Haydon-Jones (3) | 9–7, 6–4 |
| 48. | April 29, 1968 | Wembley Professional Championships, London | Indoor | Ann Haydon-Jones (4) | 4–6, 9–7, 7–5 |
| 49. | June 24, 1968 | Wimbledon, London (3) | Grass | Judy Tegart-Dalton (2) | 9–7, 7–5 |
| 50. | July 15, 1968 | National Tennis League Professional Tour, Los Angeles, U.S. | Indoor | Ann Haydon-Jones (5) | 12–10, 6–3 |
| 51. | August 5, 1968 | National Tennis League Professional Tour, Binghamton, New York, U.S. | ??? | Rosemary Casals (9) | 10–8, 6–4 |
| 52. | February 24, 1969 | International Pro Tennis Invitational, Hayward and Oakland, California, U.S. | Indoor | Ann Haydon-Jones (6) | 6–3, 6–2 |
| 53. | February 27, 1969 | International Pro Tennis Invitational, Portland, OR, U.S. | Indoor | Ann Haydon-Jones (7) | 6–3, 6–3 |
| 54. | March 3, 1969 | International Pro Tennis Invitational, Los Angeles, U.S. (2) | Indoor | Ann Haydon-Jones (8) | 17–15,^{1}, 6–3 |
| 55. | March 31, 1969 | South African Open, Johannesburg (3) | Hard | Nancy Richey Gunter (2) | 6–3, 6–4 |
| 56. | April 14, 1969 | Natal Open Championships, Durban, South Africa | Hard | Annette Van Zyl DuPlooy | 6–4, 6–1 |
| 57. | July 7, 1969 | Irish Open, Dublin (2) | Grass | Virginia Wade | 6–2, 6–2 |
| 58. | August 4, 1969 | Saint Louis Professional Tournament, Saint Louis, Missouri, U.S. | Indoor ? | Rosemary Casals (10) | 6–4, 6–2 |
| 59. | August 4, 1969 | Masters Tennis Tournament, Binghamton, New York, U.S. (2) | ??? | Ann Haydon-Jones (9) | 10–8, 3–6, 6–4 |
| 60. | September 8, 1969 | Cal-Neva Professional Tennis Tournament, Incline Village, Nevada, U.S. | ??? | Rosemary Casals (11) | 6–0, 6–4 |
| 61. | September 22, 1969 | Pacific Southwest Open, Los Angeles, U.S. (2) | Hard | Ann Haydon-Jones (10) | 6–2, 6–3 |
| 62. | September 29, 1969 | Midland Racquet Club Invitational, Midland, Texas, U.S. | Hard | Rosemary Casals (12) | 6–3, 6–3 |
| 63. | November 24, 1969 | Stockholm Indoor Open, Stockholm, Sweden | Indoor | Julie Heldman (2) | 9–7, 6–2 |
| 64. | March 16, 1970 | Dunlop International, Sydney, Australia | Grass | Margaret Court (3) | 6–2, 4–6, 6–3 |
| 65. | March 30, 1970 | Cape Town, South Africa | ??? | Rosemary Casals (13) | 6–1, 6–0 |
| 66. | April 6, 1970 | Natal Open Championships, Durban, South Africa (2) | Hard | Margaret Court (4) | 6–4, 2–6, 6–2 |
| 67. | April 20, 1970 | Italian Open, Rome^{2} | Clay | Julie Heldman (3) | 6–1, 6–3 |
| 68. | November 2, 1970 | Virginia Slims of Richmond Invitational, Richmond, Virginia, U.S. | Indoor (clay) | Nancy Richey Gunter (3) | 6–3, 6–3 |
| 69. | November 16, 1970 | Embassy Indoor Tennis Championships, Wembley Arena, London | Indoor | Ann Haydon-Jones (11) | 8–6, 3–6, 6–1 |
| 70. | January 4, 1971 | British Motor Car Invitational (Virginia Slims), San Francisco, U.S. | Indoor | Rosemary Casals (14) | 6–3, 6–4 |
| 71. | January 11, 1971 | Billie Jean King Invitational (Virginia Slims), Long Beach, California, U.S. | Indoor | Rosemary Casals (15) | 6–1, 6–2 |
| 72. | January 18, 1971 | Virginia Slims Professional Tennis Tournament, Milwaukee, Wisconsin, U.S. | Indoor | Rosemary Casals (16) | 6–3, 6–2 |
| 73. | January 25, 1971 | Virginia Slims of Oklahoma City, Invitational, Oklahoma City, Oklahoma, U.S. | Indoor | Rosemary Casals (17) | 1–6, 7–6, 6–4 |
| 74. | February 2, 1971 | Virginia Slims Invitational, Sewanee and Chattanooga, Tennessee, U.S. | Indoor | Ann Haydon-Jones (12) | 6–4, 6–1 |
| 75. | February 23, 1971 | U.S. Indoor Championships (Virginia Slims), Winchester, Massachusetts, U.S. (4) | Indoor | Rosemary Casals (18) | 4–6, 6–2, 6–3 |
| 76. | March 15, 1971 | Kmart Invitational (Virginia Slims), Rochester and Troy, Michigan, U.S. | Indoor | Rosemary Casals (19) | 3–6, 6–1, 6–2 |
| 77. | April 19, 1971 | Virginia Slims of San Diego, Invitational, San Diego, U.S. | ??? | Rosemary Casals (20) | 4–6, 7–5, 6–1 |
| 78. | May 17, 1971 | German Open, Hamburg, West Germany | Clay | Helga Niessen Masthoff | 6–3, 6–2 |
| 79. | July 12, 1971 | Rothmans North of England Championships, Hoylake, United Kingdom | Grass | Rosemary Casals (21) | 6–3, 6–3 |
| 80. | July 19, 1971 | Austrian Open, Kitzbühel | Clay | Laura Rossouw | 6–2, 4–6, 7–5 |
| 81. | August 2, 1971 | Virginia Slims of Houston, International, Houston, U.S. | Indoor | Kerry Melville Reid (2) | 6–4, 4–6, 6–1 |
| 82. | August 9, 1971 | U.S. Women's Clay Court Championships, Indianapolis, U.S. | Clay | Linda Tuero | 6–4, 7–5 |
| 83. | August 30, 1971 | US Open, New York City (2) | Grass | Rosemary Casals (22) | 6–4, 7–6(2) |
| 84. | September 13, 1971 | Virginia Slims of Louisville, Invitational, Louisville, Kentucky, U.S. | ??? | Rosemary Casals (23) | 6–1, 4–6, 6–3 |
| 85. | September 27, 1971 | Virginia Slims Thunderbird Invitational, Phoenix, Arizona, U.S.^{3} (2) | Hard | Rosemary Casals (24) | 7–5, 6–1 |
| 86. | October 25, 1971 | Embassy Indoor Championships (British Indoors), Wembley Arena, London | Indoor | Françoise Dürr | 6–1, 5–7, 7–5 |
| 87. | January 10, 1972 | British Motors Pro Tennis Championships, San Francisco, U.S. (2) | Indoor | Kerry Melville Reid (3) | 7–6, 7–6 |
| 88. | March 20, 1972 | Virginia Slims of Richmond, Invitational, Richmond, Virginia, U.S.^{4} (2) | Clay (i) | Nancy Richey Gunter (4) | 6–3, 6–4 |
| 89. | April 17, 1972 | Virginia Slims Conquistadores, Tucson, Arizona, U.S. | Hard | Françoise Dürr (2) | 6–0, 6–3 |
| 90. | May 1, 1972 | Virginia Slims Indoor, Indianapolis, U.S. | Indoor | Nancy Richey Gunter (5) | 6–3, 6–3 |
| 91. | May 22, 1972 | French Open, Paris | Clay | Evonne Goolagong Cawley | 6–3, 6–3 |
| 92. | June 5, 1972 | John Player Round Robin, Nottingham, United Kingdom | Grass | Virginia Wade (2); Rosemary Casals (25) | 6–7, 6–3, 6–4; 6–7, 6–4, 7–5 |
| 93. | June 12, 1972 | W.D. & H.O. Wills Open, Bristol, United Kingdom | Grass | Kerry Melville Reid (4) | 6–3, 6–2 |
| 94. | June 26, 1972 | Wimbledon, London (4) | Grass | Evonne Goolagong Cawley (2) | 6–3, 6–3 |
| 95. | August 28, 1972 | US Open, New York City (3) | Grass | Kerry Melville Reid (5) | 6–3, 7–5 |
| 96. | September 11, 1972 | Four Roses Premium Tennis Classic, Charlotte, North Carolina, U.S. | Clay | Margaret Court (5) | 6–2, 6–2 |
| 97. | September 25, 1972 | Virginia Slims Phoenix Thunderbird, Phoenix, Arizona, U.S. (3) | Hard | Margaret Court (6) | 7–6, 6–3 |
| 98. | February 19, 1973 | Virginia Slims of Indianapolis, Indiana, U.S. (3) | Indoor | Rosemary Casals (26) | 5–7, 6–2, 6–4 |
| 99. | May 7, 1973 | Toray Sillok, Tokyo | Indoor | Nancy Richey Gunter (6) | 7–6, 5–7, 6–3 |
| 100. | June 4, 1973 | Gulf Coast Professional Women's Tennis Tournament, Mobile, Alabama, U.S. | ??? | Françoise Dürr (3) | 6–3, 7–5 |
| 101. | June 11, 1973 | John Player Nottingham Championships, Nottingham, United Kingdom (2) | Grass | Virginia Wade (3) | 8–6, 6–4 |
| 102. | June 25, 1973 | Wimbledon, London (5) | Grass | Chris Evert | 6–0, 7–5 |
| 103. | July 30, 1973 | Virginia Slims, Denver, Colorado, U.S. | Hard | Betty Stöve | 6–4, 6–2 |
| 104. | October 1, 1973 | Thunderbird Classic (Virginia Slims), Phoenix, Arizona, U.S. (4) | Hard | Nancy Richey Gunter (7) | 6–1, 6–3 |
| 105. | October 22, 1973 | Virginia Slims of Hawaii, Honolulu, U.S. | Hard | Helen Gourlay Cawley | 6–1, 6–1 |
| 106. | November 19, 1973 | Gunze Classic, Tokyo | ??? (i) | Nancy Richey Gunter (8) | 6–4, 6–4 |
| 107. | January 14, 1974 | Virginia Slims of San Francisco, U.S. (3) | Indoor | Chris Evert (2) | 7–6, 6–2 |
| 108. | January 28, 1974 | Virginia Slims of Washington, Fairfax, Virginia, U.S. | Indoor | Kerry Melville Reid (6) | 6–0, 6–2 |
| 109. | February 18, 1974 | Virginia Slims of Detroit, Michigan, U.S. | Indoor | Rosemary Casals (27) | 6–1, 6–1 |
| 110. | March 18, 1974 | Akron Open (Virginia Slims), Ohio, U.S. | Indoor | Nancy Richey Gunter (9) | 6–3, 7–5 |
| 111. | March 25, 1974 | U.S. Indoor Championships (Virginia Slims), New York City, U.S. (5) | Indoor | Chris Evert (3) | 6–3, 3–6, 6–2 |
| 112. | August 26, 1974 | US Open, New York City (4) | Grass | Evonne Goolagong Cawley (3) | 3–6, 6–3, 7–5 |
| 113. | January 13, 1975 | Virginia Slims of Sarasota, Florida, U.S. | Indoor | Chris Evert (4) | 6–2, 6–3 |
| 114. | June 23, 1975 | Wimbledon, London (6) | Grass | Evonne Goolagong Cawley (4) | 6–0, 6–1 |
| 115. | March 21, 1977 | Lionel Cup, San Antonio, Texas, U.S. | Indoor | Mary Hamm | 6–3, 3–6, 6–3 |
| 116. | April 11, 1977 | Lionel Cup, North Hempstead, New York, U.S. | Indoor | Caroline Stoll | 6–1, 6–1 |
| 117. | October 10, 1977 | Thunderbird Classic Tournament, Phoenix, Arizona, U.S. (5) | Hard | Wendy Turnbull | 1–6, 6–1, 6–0 |
| 118. | October 17, 1977 | São Paulo, Brazil | Hard (i) (?) | Betty Stöve (2) | 6–1, 6–4 |
| 119. | October 24, 1977 | Borinquen Classic (Virginia Slims), San Juan, Puerto Rico | Hard | Janet Newberry | 6–1, 6–3 |
| 120. | November 21, 1977 | Gunze World Tennis Tournament, Kobe and Tokyo, Japan (2) | Hard (i) | Martina Navratilova | 7–5, 5–7, 6–1 |
| 121. | December 5, 1977 | Bremar Cup, London | Indoor | Virginia Wade (4) | 6–3, 6–1 |
| 122. | September 10, 1979 | Toray Sillook, Tokyo (2) | Indoor | Evonne Goolagong Cawley (5) | 6–4, 7–5 |
| 123. | October 29, 1979 | Stockholm Open, Sweden | Indoor | Betty Stöve (3) | 6–3, 6–7, 7–5 |
| 124. | February 18, 1980 | Avon Championships of Detroit, Michigan, U.S. (2) | Indoor | Evonne Goolagong Cawley (6) | 6–3, 6–0 |
| 125. | February 25, 1980 | Avon Championships of Houston, Texas, U.S. (2) | Indoor | Martina Navratilova (2) | 6–1, 6–3 |
| 126. | September 8, 1980 | Toray Sillok, Tokyo (3) | Indoor | Terry Holladay | 7–5, 6–4 |
| 127. | June 7, 1982 | Birmingham, United Kingdom | Grass | Rosalyn Fairbank | 6–2, 6–1 |
| 128. | May 30, 1983 | Kentish Times Festival, Beckenham, United Kingdom | Grass | Barbara Potter | 6–4, 6–3 |
| 129. | June 6, 1983 | Edgbaston Cup, Birmingham, United Kingdom (2) | Grass | Alycia Moulton | 6–0, 7–5 |

^{1} The crowd of 7,000 booed when a tiebreak was announced at 12–12. Both King and Jones refused to play a tiebreak, and a happy crowd got its money's worth. King got a standing ovation when she won the 17–15 set.
^{2} This was the first important clay court title of King's career.
^{3} With this tournament championship, King became the first woman ever to win more than U.S.$100,000 in prize money during a calendar year.
^{4} This victory snapped Gunter's 13-match winning streak on indoor clay courts.

==== Runners-up (54) ====
| No. | Week of | Tournament Name and Location | Surface | Opponent | Score |
|---|---|---|---|---|---|
| 1. | April or May, 1961 | Central California Championships, Sacramento, California, U.S. | ??? | Carole Caldwell Graebner | ??? |
| 2. | May 8, 1961 | Southern California Championships, Los Angeles, U.S. | Hard | Karen Hantze Susman | 4–6, 1–6 |
| 3. | May 7, 1962 | Southern California Championships, Los Angeles, U.S. (2) | Hard | Karen Hantze Susman (2) | 3–6, 4–6 |
| 4. | June 24, 1963 | Wimbledon, London | Grass | Margaret Court | 3–6, 4–6 |
| 5. | September 16, 1963 | Pacific Southwest Championships, Los Angeles, U.S. | Hard | Darlene Hard | 3–6, 3–6 |
| 6. | January 6, 1964 | Dallas Indoor Invitational, Dallas, U.S. | Indoor | Nancy Richey Gunter | 2–6, 5–7 |
| 7. | May 4, 1964 | Southern California Championships, Los Angeles, U.S. (3) | Hard | Carole Caldwell Graebner (2) | 5–7, 6–3, 1–6 |
| 8. | August 3, 1964 | Piping Rock Invitational, Locust Valley, New York, U.S. | Grass | Nancy Richey Gunter (2) | 3–6, 6–1, 4–6 |
| 9. | September 28, 1964 | Pacific Southwest Championships, Los Angeles, U.S. (2) | Hard | Maria Bueno | 6–3, 3–6, 3–6 |
| 10. | November 23, 1964 | New South Wales Championships, Sydney, Australia | Grass | Margaret Court (2) | 4–6, 3–6 |
| 11. | December 28, 1964 | South Australian Championships, Adelaide, Australia | Grass | Gail Sherriff Chanfreau Lovera | 6–2, 4–6, 1–6 |
| 12. | August 30, 1965 | U.S. Championships, New York City | Grass | Margaret Court (3) | 6–8, 5–7 |
| 13. | February 6, 1967 | New England Women's Indoors, Salem, Massachusetts, U.S. | Indoor | Mary-Ann Eisel | 4–6, 7–5, 9–11 |
| 14. | December 11, 1967 | South Australian Championships, Adelaide, Australia (2) | Grass | Judy Tegart-Dalton | 6–4, 1–6, 4–6 |
| 15. | May 13, 1968 | Madison Square Garden Pro, New York City, US | Hard (i) | Ann Haydon-Jones | 4–6, 4–6 |
| 16. | August 12, 1968 | National Tennis League, Colonial Pro Invitational, Fort Worth, Texas, U.S. | ??? | Ann Haydon-Jones (2) | 1–6, 2–6 |
| 17. | August 26, 1968 | US Open, New York City (2) | Grass | Virginia Wade | 4–6, 2–6 |
| 18. | January 20, 1969 | Australian Open, Brisbane, Australia | Grass | Margaret Court (4) | 4–6, 1–6 |
| 19. | June 9, 1969 | Wills Open, Bristol, United Kingdom | Grass | Margaret Court (5) | 3–6, 3–6 |
| 20. | June 23, 1969 | Wimbledon, London (2) | Grass | Ann Haydon-Jones (3) | 6–3, 3–6, 2–6 |
| 21. | October 6, 1969 | Howard Hughes Open, Las Vegas, Nevada, U.S. | Hard | Nancy Richey Gunter (3) | 6–2, 4–6, 1–6 |
| 22. | October 13, 1969 | Professional tournament in connection with dedication of the Sherwood Center, Whitman College, Walla Walla, Washington, U.S. | ? | Rosemary Casals | 6–8 |
| 23. | November 17, 1969 | British Open Indoor Tennis Championships, Wembley Arena, London | Indoor | Ann Haydon-Jones (4) | 11–9, 2–6, 7–9 |
| 24. | February 2, 1970 | International Tennis Players Association Indoor Open, Philadelphia, U.S. | Indoor | Margaret Court (6) | 3–6, 6–7 |
| 25. | March 2, 1970 | Maureen Connolly Brinker Memorial Tennis Tournament, Dallas, Texas, U.S. | Hard (?) | Margaret Court (7) | 6–1, 3–6, 9–11 |
| 26. | March 23, 1970 | South African Open, Johannesburg | Hard | Margaret Court (8) | 4–6, 6–1, 3–6 |
| 27. | June 22, 1970 | Wimbledon, London (3) | Grass | Margaret Court (9) | 12–14, 9–11 |
| 28. | February 15, 1971 | International Tennis Championships (Virginia Slims), Fort Lauderdale, Florida, U.S. | Clay | Françoise Dürr | 3–6, 6–3, 3–6 |
| 29. | March 22, 1971 | Virginia Slims Invitational, New York City, U.S. | Indoor | Rosemary Casals (2) | 4–6, 4–6 |
| 30. | April 12, 1971 | World Championship (Virginia Slims), Las Vegas, Nevada, U.S. | ??? | Ann Haydon-Jones (5) | 5–7, 4–6 |
| 31. | June 14, 1971 | London Grass Courts Tennis Championships, Queen's Club, London, United Kingdom | Wood (i) & Grass | Margaret Court (10) | 3–6, 6–3, 3–6 (grass) |
| 32. | August 16, 1971 | Virginia Slims Clay Court Championship, Lake Bluff, Illinois, U.S. | Clay | Françoise Dürr (2) | 4–6, 2–6 |
| 33. | November 29, 1971 | International Lawn Tennis Championship, Christchurch, New Zealand | Grass | Françoise Dürr (3) | 3–6, 0–6 |
| 34. | January 31, 1972 | Virginia Slims International, Fort Lauderdale, Florida, U.S. (2) | Clay | Chris Evert | 1–6, 0–6 |
| 35. | March 6, 1972 | Maureen Connolly Brinker International Ladies Championship (Virginia Slims), Dallas, Texas, U.S. (2) | Indoor | Nancy Richey Gunter (4) | 6–7, 1–6 |
| 36. | April 3, 1972 | Virginia Slims, Jacksonville, Florida, U.S. | Clay | Marie NeumannováPinterová | 4–6, 3–6 |
| 37. | August 14, 1972 | Virginia Slims, Denver, Colorado, U.S. | Outdoor | Nancy Richey Gunter (5) | 6–1, 4–6, 4–6 |
| 38. | August 21, 1972 | Virginia Slims Grass Court Championships, Newport, Rhode Island, U.S. | Grass | Margaret Court (11) | 4–6, 1–6 |
| 39. | September 18, 1972 | Golden Gate Pacific Coast Tennis Classic, Oakland, California, U.S. | Hard | Margaret Court (12) | 2–6, 4–6 |
| 40. | March 5, 1973 | Virginia Slims, Chicago, U.S. (2) | Indoor | Margaret Court (13) | 2–6, 6–4, 4–6 |
| 41. | April 9, 1973 | Virginia Slims of Boston, Quincy, Massachusetts, U.S. | Indoor | Margaret Court (14) | 2–6, 4–6 |
| 42. | August 6, 1973 | Commerce Union Bank Classic (Virginia Slims), Nashville, Tennessee, U.S. | ??? | Margaret Court (15) | 3–6, 6–4, 2–6 |
| 43. | November 19, 1973 | Lady Baltimore, Baltimore, Maryland, U.S. | Indoor | Rosemary Casals (3) | 6–3, 6–7(3–5), 4–6 |
| 44. | January 21, 1974 | Virginia Slims of Mission Viejo, Palm Springs, California, U.S. | Hard | Chris Evert (2) | 3–6, 1–6 |
| 45. | April 22, 1974 | Virginia Slims, Philadelphia, Pennsylvania, U.S. | Indoor | Olga Morozova | 6–7(2–5), 1–6 |
| 46. | January 6, 1975 | Virginia Slims, San Francisco, U.S. | Indoor | Chris Evert (3) | 1–6, 1–6 |
| 47. | April 14, 1975 | L'Eggs World Series of Tennis, Austin, Texas, U.S. | Hard | Chris Evert (4) | 6–4, 3–6, 6–7(2–5) |
| 48. | June 16, 1975 | Eastbourne International, Eastbourne, United Kingdom | Grass | Virginia Wade (2) | 5–7, 6–4, 4–6 |
| 49. | March 28, 1977 | Family Circle Cup, Hilton Head, South Carolina, U.S. | Clay | Chris Evert (5) | 0–6, 1–6 |
| 50. | October 31, 1977 | Colgate Series Championships, Rancho Mirage, California, U.S. | Hard | Chris Evert (6) | 2–6, 2–6 |
| 51. | January 16, 1978 | Virginia Slims, Houston, Texas, U.S. | Indoor | Martina Navratilova | 6–1, 2–6, 2–6 |
| 52. | February 27, 1978 | Virginia Slims, Kansas City, Missouri, U.S. | Indoor | Martina Navratilova (2) | 5–7, 6–2, 3–6 |
| 53. | March 27, 1978 | Virginia Slims, Philadelphia, Pennsylvania, U.S. (2) | Indoor | Chris Evert (7) | 0–6, 4–6 |
| 54. | July 23, 1979 | Buenos Aires Orbas, Argentina | Indoor | Martina Navratilova (3) | 3–6, 4–6 |

=== Doubles ===
==== Wins ====
| No. | Date | Tournament | Surface | Partner | Opponents | Score |
|---|---|---|---|---|---|---|
| 1. | Oct 1977 | Thunderbird Phoenix Open, Phoenix, Arizona, US | Hard | (Czechoslovakia) Martina Navratilova | (Australia) Helen Gourlay (United States) JoAnne Russell | 6–1, 7–5 |
| 2. | Jan 1978 | Virginia Slims of Washington, D.C., US | Carpet (i) | (Czechoslovakia) Martina Navratilova | (Netherlands) Betty Stöve (Australia) Wendy Turnbull | 6–3, 7–5 |
| 3. | Jan 1978 | Virginia Slims of Houston, US | Carpet (i) | (Czechoslovakia) Martina Navratilova | (United States) Mona Guerrant (South Africa) Greer Stevens | 7–6, 4–6, 7–6 |
| 4. | Feb 1978 | Virginia Slims of Detroit, US | Carpet (i) | (Czechoslovakia) Martina Navratilova | (Australia) Kerry Reid (Australia) Wendy Turnbull | 6–3, 6–4 |
| 5. | Feb 1978 | Virginia Slims of Kansas City, US | Carpet (i) | (Czechoslovakia) Martina Navratilova | (Australia) Kerry Reid (Australia) Wendy Turnbull | 6–4, 6–4 |
| 6. | Mar 1978 | Virginia Slims of Boston, US | Carpet (i) | (Czechoslovakia) Martina Navratilova | (Australia) Evonne Goolagong (Netherlands) Betty Stöve | 6–3, 6–2 |
| 7. | Apr 1978 | Bridgestone Doubles Championships, Salt Lake City, Utah, US | Carpet (i) | (Czechoslovakia) Martina Navratilova | (France) Françoise Dürr (United Kingdom) Virginia Wade | 6–4, 6–4 |
| 8. | Apr 1978 | Family Circle Cup, Hilton Head Island, South Carolina, US | Clay | (Czechoslovakia) Martina Navratilova | (United States) Mona Guerrant (South Africa) Greer Stevens | 6–3, 7–5 |
| 9. | Aug 1978 | US Open, New York City | Hard | (Czechoslovakia) Martina Navratilova | (Australia) Kerry Reid (Australia) Wendy Turnbull | 7–6, 6–4 |
| 10. | Nov 1978 | Colgate Series Championships, Palm Springs, California, US | Hard | (Czechoslovakia) Martina Navratilova | (Australia) Kerry Reid (Australia) Wendy Turnbull | 6–3, 6–4 |
| 11. | Jun 1979 | Wimbledon, London | Grass | (Czechoslovakia) Martina Navratilova | (Netherlands) Betty Stöve (Australia) Wendy Turnbull | 5–7, 6–3, 6–2 |
| 12. | Oct 1979 | US Indoor Championships, Minneapolis, US (2) | Carpet (i) | (Czechoslovakia) Martina Navratilova | (Netherlands) Betty Stöve (Australia) Wendy Turnbull | 6–4, 7–6 |
| 13. | Nov 1979 | Porsche Tennis Grand Prix, Filderstadt, Germany | Carpet (i) | (Czechoslovakia) Martina Navratilova | (Netherlands) Betty Stöve (Australia) Wendy Turnbull | 6–3, 6–3 |
| 14. | Jan 1980 | Colgate Series Championships, Landover, Maryland, US | Carpet (i) | (Czechoslovakia) Martina Navratilova | (United States) Rosemary Casals (United States) Chris Evert | 6–4, 6–3 |
| 15. | Jan 1980 | Avon Championships of Kansas City, US | Carpet (i) | (Czechoslovakia) Martina Navratilova | (United States) Laura Du Pont (United States) Pam Shriver | 6–3, 6–1 |
| 16. | Jan 1980 | Avon Championships of Chicago, US | Carpet (i) | (Czechoslovakia) Martina Navratilova | (West Germany) Sylvia Hanika (United States) Kathy Jordan | 6–3, 6–4 |
| 17. | Mar 1980 | Avon Championships of Dallas, US | Carpet (i) | (Czechoslovakia) Martina Navratilova | (United States) Rosemary Casals (Australia) Wendy Turnbull | 4–6, 6–3, 6–3 |
| 18. | Mar 1980 | The Avon Championships, New York City | Carpet (i) | (Czechoslovakia) Martina Navratilova | (United States) Rosemary Casals (Australia) Wendy Turnbull | 6–3, 4–6, 6–3 |
| 19. | Apr 1980 | Bridgestone Doubles Championships, Tokyo | Carpet (i) | (Czechoslovakia) Martina Navratilova | (United Kingdom) Sue Barker (United States) Ann Kiyomura | 7–5, 6–3 |
| 20. | Jul 1980 | Central Fidelity Bank International, Richmond, Virginia, US | Hard | (Czechoslovakia) Martina Navratilova | (United States) Pam Shriver (United States) Anne Smith | 6–4, 4–6, 6–3 |
| 21. | Aug 1980 | US Open, New York City | Hard | (Czechoslovakia) Martina Navratilova | (United States) Pam Shriver (Netherlands) Betty Stöve | 7–6, 7–5 |

== Year end singles rankings ==
| Type | 1959 | 1960 | 1961 | 1962 | 1963 | 1964 | 1965 | 1966 | 1967 | 1968 | 1969 | 1970 | 1971 | 1972 | 1973 | 1974 | 1975 | 1976 | 1977 | 1978 | 1979 | 1980 | 1981 | 1982 | 1983 |
|---|---|---|---|---|---|---|---|---|---|---|---|---|---|---|---|---|---|---|---|---|---|---|---|---|---|
| World^{1} | N | N | N | N | 4^{2} | 7 | 4^{3} | 1 | 1 | 1 | 3^{4} | 2^{5} | 1 | 1 | 2^{5} | 1 | 2^{6} | N | 2^{6} | 5 | 5 | 7 | N | N | N |
| WTA^{7} | - | - | - | - | - | - | - | - | - | - | - | - | - | - | - | - | 4^{14} | N | 2 | 5 | 5 | 6 | N | 14 | 13 |
| U.S.^{8} | N | 4^{9} | 3^{10} | 3^{10} | 2^{11} | 2^{12} | 1C | 1 | 1 | E | E | 1 | 1 | 1 | 1 | 2^{6} | E | N | 2^{6} | 2^{6} | 4^{13} | 5 | N | 7 | E |

- E = excluded from the rankings, because she was a contract professional player (1968–69), had retired (1975), or for unknown reasons (1983).
- N = not ranked in top ten.
- C = co-ranked U.S. No. 1 with Nancy Richey.

^{1} The world rankings in this table are from Lance Tingay of the London Daily Telegraph for 1959 through 1967 and from Bud Collins for 1968 through 1983.
^{2} King was ranked behind Margaret Court, Lesley Turner Bowrey, and Maria Bueno.
^{3} King was ranked behind Court, Bueno, and Bowrey.
^{4} King was ranked behind Court and Ann Haydon-Jones.
^{5} King was ranked behind Court.
^{6} King was ranked behind Chris Evert.
^{7} The Women's Tennis Association (WTA) rankings began in 1975.
^{8} The U.S. rankings are from the United States Tennis Association.
^{9} King was ranked behind Darlene Hard, Karen Hantze Susman, and Richey.
^{10} King was ranked behind Hard and Susman.
^{11} King was ranked behind Hard.
^{12} King was ranked behind Richey.
^{13} King was ranked behind Martina Navratilova, Evert, and Tracy Austin.
^{14} King was ranked behind Evert, Virginia Wade, and Navratilova.
