= 1980 Toray Sillook Open =

- Date: 8–14 September
- Edition: 8th
- Category: Colgate Series (AAAA)
- Draw: 32S
- Prize money: $175,000
- Surface: Carpet / indoor
- Location: Tokyo, Japan
- Venue: Yoyogi National Gymnasium

Champions

Singles
- (United States) Billie Jean King
← 1979 ·	Pan Pacific Open	· 1981 →

The 1980 Toray Sillook Open was a women's singles tennis tournament played on indoor carpet courts at Yoyogi National Gymnasium in Tokyo in Japan. The event was part of the AAAA (Note: Tournaments with prize money for the women of at least $175,000.) category of the 1980 Colgate Series. It was the eighth edition of the tournament and was held from 8 September through 14 September 1980. First-seeded Billie Jean King won the title and earned $34,000 first-prize money.

== Finals ==
=== Singles ===
(United States) Billie Jean King defeated (United States) Terry Holladay 7–5, 6–4

- It was King's 3rd singles title of the year and the 126th of her career.

== Prize money ==
Event	W	F	3rd	4th	QF	Round of 16	Round of 32
Singles	$34,000	$18,000	$10,500	$8,500	$4,600	$2,500	$1,300
