= Dallas Invitational (tennis) =

Defunct tennis tournament
- Tour: ILTF World Circuit
- Founded: 1943; 83 years ago
- Abolished: 1971; 55 years ago
- Location: Dallas, Texas, United States
- Venue: Dallas Country Club (1943-1965); Samuell Grand Tennis Center (1966-1971)
- Surface: Hard

The Dallas Invitational was a combined men's and women's international hard court, ILTF affiliated tennis tournament founded in 1943. It was organized by the Dallas Tennis Association and first played at the Dallas Country Club, Dallas, Texas in the United States. In 1966 the venue refused to let Arthur Ashe play because he was black, the event was withdrawn from the Dallas Country Club and moved to Samuell Grand Tennis Center for the duration of its run. The event was part of the ILTF World Circuit. The tournament ran annually until 1971 then was discontinued.

== Finals ==
=== Men's Singles ===
(incomplete roll) Included:

Year	Winners	Runners-up	Score
1949	(United States) Art Larsen	(United States) Earl Cochell	6–2, 1–6, 6–4, 6–4
1954	(United States) Vic Seixas	(United States) Tony Trabert	1–6, 6–3, 6–1, 6–4
1955	(United States) Tony Trabert	(United States) Vic Seixas	6–3, 6–2, 7–5
1956	(United States) Dick Savitt	(United States) Ham Richardson	6–3, 7–5, 3–6, 4–6, 6–3
1957	(Australia) Mervyn Rose	(United States) Vic Seixas	6–4, 8–6, 10–8
1958	(United States) Tut Bartzen	(United States) Dick Savitt	3–6, 4–6, 4–6, 6–4, 6–2
1959	(Egypt) Jaroslav Drobný	(United States) Butch Buchholz	6–4, 6–1
1960	(United States) Barry MacKay	(United States) Tut Bartzen	7–5, 6–8, 7–5, 0–6, 6–4
1961	(United States) Tut Bartzen (2)	(United States) Ham Richardson	3–6, 6–2, 6–2, 6–0
1962	(United States) Ham Richardson	(United States) Chuck McKinley	6–4, 6–2
1963	(Australia) Fred Stolle	(United States) Ham Richardson	6–4, 7–5
1964	(United States) Frank Froehling	(United States) Ham Richardson	6–4, 6–4
1965	(United States) Cliff Richey	(United States) Ham Richardson	4–6, 6–4, 6–2
1966	(United States) Arthur Ashe	(Puerto Rico) Charlie Pasarell	5–7, 6–4, 6–4
1967	(Australia) Tony Roche	(United States) Ron Holmberg	4–6, 10–8, 6–2, 14–12
1968	(South Africa) Ray Moore	(Australia) Allan Stone	4–6, 12–10, 6–3
↓ Open era ↓
1969	(United States) Stan Smith	(Brazil) Thomaz Koch	6–3, 6–4
1971	(West Germany) Harald Elschenbroich	(United States) Brian Gottfried	7–5, 3–6, 6–3

=== Women's Singles ===
(incomplete roll))

Year	Winners	Runners-up	Score
1963	(United States) Nancy Richey	(United States) Victoria Palmer	6-3, 7-5
1964	(United States) Nancy Richey (2)	(United States) Victoria Palmer	6-2, 13-11
1965	(United States) Nancy Richey (3)	(Australia) Margaret Smith	6-1, 6-4
1968	(South Africa) Maryna Godwin	(United States) Julie Heldman	7-9 6-3 6-4
↓ Open era ↓
1971	(South Africa) Pat Walkden	(Australia) Dianne Fromholtz	9-7, 6-3

== See also ==
- Dallas Indoor Invitational
