= 1977 Toray Sillook Open – Singles =

Singles
- 1977 Toray Sillook Open

Final
- Champion: (United Kingdom) Virginia Wade
- Runner-up: (United States) Martina Navratilova
- Score: 7–5, 5–7, 6–4

Details
- Draw: 16
- Seeds: 4

Events
Singles
← 1976 ·	Pan Pacific Open	· 1978 →

Betty Stöve was the defending champion, but lost in the first round to Terry Holladay.

Virginia Wade won the title by defeating Martina Navratilova 7–5, 5–7, 6–4 in the final.

== Seeds ==
1. (United States) Martina Navratilova (final)
2. (United Kingdom) Virginia Wade (champion)
3. (United Kingdom) Sue Barker (semifinals)
4. (Netherlands) Betty Stöve (first round)

== Draw ==
=== Key ===
- Q = Qualifier
- WC = Wild card
- LL = Lucky loser
- Alt = Alternate
- SE = Special exempt
- PR = Protected ranking
- ITF = ITF entry
- JE = Junior exempt
- w/o = Walkover
- r = Retired
- d = Defaulted
- SR = Special ranking

=== Draw ===
First round
1	(United States) Martina Navratilova	6	6
(Australia) Dianne Fromholtz	4	3
(Socialist Federal Republic of Yugoslavia) Mima Jaušovec	7	6
(France) Françoise Dürr	5	0
4	(Netherlands) Betty Stöve	6	6	1
(United States) Terry Holladay	7	2	6
(Australia) Wendy Turnbull	4	6	7
Q	(United States) Carrie Meyer	6	4	6
(United States) Janet Newberry	1	6	4
(United States) Julie Anthony	6	3	6
(Japan) Naoko Sato	3	0
3	(United Kingdom) Sue Barker	6	6
(United States) Laura duPont	0	6
Q	(United Kingdom) Michelle Tyler	6	7
(Australia) Kerry Reid	4	3
2	(United Kingdom) Virginia Wade	6	6

Quarterfinals
1	(United States) Martina Navratilova	6	6
(Socialist Federal Republic of Yugoslavia) Mima Jaušovec	3	4
(United States) Terry Holladay	3	4
(Australia) Wendy Turnbull	6	6
(United States) Julie Anthony	3	6
3	(United Kingdom) Sue Barker	6	7
Q	(United Kingdom) Michelle Tyler	0	6
2	(United Kingdom) Virginia Wade	6	7

Semifinals
1	(United States) Martina Navratilova	6	6
(Australia) Wendy Turnbull	2	3
3	(United Kingdom) Sue Barker	4	6	2
2	(United Kingdom) Virginia Wade	6	2	6

Final
1	(United States) Martina Navratilova	5	7	4
2	(United Kingdom) Virginia Wade	7	5	6
