= 1977 Virginia Slims of Chicago =

- Date: February 7–13
- Edition: 6th
- Category: Virginia Slims circuit
- Draw: 34S / 16D
- Prize money: $100,000
- Surface: Carpet (Sporteze) / indoor
- Location: Chicago, Illinois, US
- Venue: International Amphitheatre

Champions

Singles
- (United States) Chris Evert

Doubles
- (United States) Rosie Casals / (United States) Chris Evert
- Virginia Slims of Chicago

The 1977 Virginia Slims of Chicago was a women's tennis tournament played on indoor carpet courts at the International Amphitheatre in Chicago in the United States that was part of the 1977 Virginia Slims World Championship Series. It was the sixth edition of the tournament and was held from February 7 through February 13, 1977. First-seeded Chris Evert won the singles title and earned $20,000 first-prize money.

== Finals ==
=== Singles ===
(United States) Chris Evert defeated (Australia) Margaret Court 6–1, 6–3

- It was Evert's 3rd singles title of the year and the 70th of her career.

=== Doubles ===
(United States) Rosie Casals / (United States) Chris Evert defeated (Australia) Margaret Court / (Netherlands) Betty Stöve 6–3, 6–4

== Prize money ==
Event	W	F	3rd	4th	QF	Round of 16	Round of 32
Singles	$20,000	$10,000	$5,800	$5,000	$2,500	$1,375	$775
