= 1977 Virginia Slims of Florida =

Women's tennis tournament

- Date: January 10–16
- Edition: 1st
- Category: Virginia Slims circuit
- Draw: 34S / 16D
- Prize money: $100,000
- Surface: Carpet (Sporteze) / indoor
- Location: Hollywood, Florida, US
- Venue: Sportatorium

Champions

Singles
- (United States) Chris Evert

Doubles
- (United States) Martina Navratilova / (Netherlands) Betty Stöve
| Virginia Slims of Florida | · 1978 → |

The 1977 Virginia Slims of Florida was a women's tennis tournament played on indoor carpet courts at the Sportatorium in Hollywood, Florida, United States, that was part of the 1977 Virginia Slims World Championship Series. It was the inaugural edition of the tournament and was held from January 10 through January 16, 1977. First-seeded Chris Evert won the singles title and earned $20,000 first-prize money.

== Finals ==
=== Singles ===
(United States) Chris Evert defeated (Australia) Margaret Court 6–3, 6–4

- It was Evert's 1st singles title of the year and the 68th of her career.

=== Doubles ===
(United States) Martina Navratilova / (Netherlands) Betty Stöve defeated (United States) Rosie Casals / (United States) Chris Evert 6–4, 3–6, 6–4

== Prize money ==
| Event | W | F | 3rd | 4th | QF | Round of 16 | Round of 32 | Prelim. |
| Singles | $20,000 | $10,500 | $5,800 | $5,000 | $2,500 | $1,375 | $775 | $400 |
