= 1979 Toray Sillook Open =

- Date: 11–16 September
- Edition: 7th
- Category: Colgate Series (AAAA)
- Draw: 32S
- Prize money: $150,000
- Surface: Carpet / indoor
- Location: Tokyo, Japan
- Venue: Yoyogi National Gymnasium

Champions

Singles
- (United States) Billie Jean King
| ← 1978 · | Pan Pacific Open | · 1980 → |

The 1979 Toray Sillook Open was a women's singles tennis tournament played on indoor carpet courts at Yoyogi National Gymnasium in Tokyo in Japan. The event was part of the AAAA (Note: Tournaments with prize money for the women of at least $150,000.) category of the 1979 Colgate Series. It was the seventh edition of the tournament and was held from 11 September through 16 September 1979. Sixth-seeded Billie Jean King won the title and earned $32,000 first-prize money. By reaching the final, Evonne Goolagong Cawley became the fourth female player to break the mark of $1 million in prize-money.

== Finals ==
=== Singles ===
(United States) Billie Jean King defeated (Australia) Evonne Goolagong Cawley 6–4, 7–5

- It was King's 1st singles title of the year and the 122nd of her career.

== Prize money ==
| Event | W | F | 3rd | 4th | QF | Round of 16 | Round of 32 |
| Singles | $32,000 | $16,000 | $8,600 | $8,150 | $4,000 | $2,000 | $1,000 |
