= 1977 Toray Sillook Open =

- Date: 14–18 September
- Edition: 5th
- Draw: 16S
- Prize money: $100,000
- Surface: Carpet / indoor
- Location: Osaka, Japan; Tokyo, Japan
- Venue: Nichi Dai University Auditorium; Yoyogi National Gymnasium

Champions

Singles
- (United Kingdom) Virginia Wade
← 1976 ·	Pan Pacific Open	· 1978 →

The 1977 Toray Sillook Open was a women's tennis tournament played on indoor carpet courts in Tokyo, Japan that was a non-tour event, independent of the 1977 WTA Tour. It was the fifth edition of the tournament and was held from 14 September through 18 September, 1977. The first round and the quarterfinals were held in Osaka while the semifinals and final were held at the Yoyogi National Gymnasium in Tokyo. The singles event was the only competition held and was won by second-seeded Virginia Wade who earned $20,000 first-prize money.

== Final ==
=== Singles ===
(United Kingdom) Virginia Wade defeated (United States) Martina Navratilova 7–5, 5–7, 6–4

== Prize money ==
Event	W	F	SF	QF	Round of 16
Singles	$20,000	$10,000	$5,875	$2,500	$1,500
