= 1981 Toray Sillook Open =

- Date: 14–20 September
- Edition: 9th
- Category: Toyota Series (Category 3)
- Draw: 32S
- Prize money: $150,000
- Surface: Carpet / indoor
- Location: Tokyo, Japan
- Venue: Yoyogi National Gymnasium

Champions

Singles
- (United States) Ann Kiyomura
← 1980 ·	Pan Pacific Open	· 1982 →

The 1981 Toray Sillook Open was a women's singles tennis tournament played on indoor carpet courts at Yoyogi National Gymnasium in Tokyo in Japan. The event was part of the Category 3 (Note: Tournaments with prize money for the women of at least $100,000.) of the 1981 Toyota Series. It was the ninth edition of the tournament and was held from 14 September through 20 September 1981. Unseeded Ann Kiyomura won the title and earned $34,000 first-prize money.

== Finals ==
=== Singles ===
(United States) Ann Kiyomura defeated (West Germany) Bettina Bunge 6–4, 7–5

- It was Kiyomura's 2nd singles title of the year and of her career.

== Prize money ==
Event	W	F	3rd	4th	QF	Round of 16	Round of 32
Singles	$34,000	$18,000	$10,500	$8,500	$4,000	$2,000	$1,000
