= 1976 Colgate International Championships =

- Date: 30 November – 5 December
- Edition: 1st
- Category: Colgate Series (AAA)
- Draw: 32S / 16D
- Prize money: $100,000
- Surface: Grass
- Location: Sydney, Australia
- Venue: White City Stadium

Champions

Singles
- (United States) Martina Navratilova

Doubles
- (United States) Martina Navratilova / (Netherlands) Betty Stöve
- WTA Sydney Open

The 1976 Colgate International Championships, was a women's tennis tournament played on outdoor grass courts at White City Stadium in Sydney in Australia. The event was part of the AAA (Note: Tournaments with prize money for the women of at least $100,000.) category of the Colgate International Series of the 1977 WTA Tour. It was the inaugural edition of the tournament and was held from 30 November through 5 December 1976. Second-seeded Martina Navratilova won the singles title and earned $22,000 first-prize money.

== Finals ==
=== Singles ===
(United States) Martina Navratilova defeated (Netherlands) Betty Stöve 7–5, 6–2

- It was Navratilova's 2nd and last singles title of the year and the 7th of her career.

=== Doubles ===
(United States) Martina Navratilova / (Netherlands) Betty Stöve defeated (France) Françoise Dürr / (United States) Ann Kiyomura 6–3, 7–5

== Prize money ==
Event	W	F	SF	QF	Round of 16	Round of 32
Singles	$22,000	$11,000	$5,500	$2,650	$1,300	$700
