= 1976 Colgate Inaugural =

- Date: October 17–24
- Edition: 1st
- Category: Colgate Series (AAAA)
- Draw: 16S / 8D
- Prize money: $175,000
- Surface: Hard / outdoor
- Location: Palm Springs, California, United States
- Venue: Mission Hills Country Club

Champions

Singles
- (United States) Chris Evert

Doubles
- (United States) Chris Evert / (United States) Martina Navratilova
Colgate Inaugural	· 1977 →

The 1976 Colgate Inaugural was a women's singles tennis tournament played on outdoor hardcourts at the Mission Hills Country Club in Palm Springs, California in the United States. The event was part of the AAAA category (Note: Tournaments with prize money for women of at least $150,000.) of the Colgate International Series which was incorporated into the 1977 WTA Tour. It was the inaugural edition of the tournament and was held from October 17 through October 24, 1976. First-seeded Chris Evert won the singles title and earned $45,000 first-prize money.

== Finals ==
=== Singles ===
(United States) Chris Evert defeated (France) Françoise Dürr 6–1, 6–2

- It was Evert's 11th singles title of the year and the 66th of her career.

=== Doubles ===
(United States) Chris Evert / (United States) Martina Navratilova defeated (United States) Billie Jean King / (Netherlands) Betty Stöve 6–2, 6–4

== Prize money ==
Event	W	F	3rd	4th	QF	Round of 16
Singles	$45,000	$23,000	$12,000	$11,000	$6,000	$3,000
