= 1975 Toray Sillook Open =

- Date: 16–19 September
- Edition: 3rd
- Draw: 8S
- Prize money: $50,000
- Surface: Carpet / indoor
- Location: Tokyo, Japan; Osaka, Japan
- Venue: Yoyogi National Gymnasium

Champions

Singles
- (Australia) Margaret Court

Doubles
- (Australia) Margaret Court / (Australia) Evonne Goolagong
← 1974 ·	Pan Pacific Open	· 1976 →

The 1975 Toray Sillook Open was a women's tennis tournament played on indoor carpet courts in Tokyo and Osaka, Japan that was an ILTF event, independent of the 1975 WTA Tour. It was the third edition of the tournament and was held from 16 September through 19 September 1975. The first round was played at the Yoyogi National Gymnasium in Tokyo while the semifinals and final were held in Osaka. Second-seeded Margaret Court won the singles title and earned $16,000 first-prize money.

== Finals ==
=== Singles ===
(Australia) Margaret Court defeated (Australia) Evonne Goolagong 6–7^{(4–5)}, 6–1, 7–5

=== Doubles ===
(Australia) Margaret Court / (Australia) Evonne Goolagong defeated (Australia) Helen Gourlay / (United States) Ann Kiyomura 6–1, 7–5

== Prize money ==
Event	W	F	SF	QF
Singles	$16,000	$8,000	$4,000	$2,000
