= 1979 Avon Championships of Florida =

- Date: January 22–28
- Edition: 3rd
- Category: Virginia Slims circuit
- Draw: 32S / 16D
- Prize money: $150,000
- Surface: Carpet (Sporteze) / indoor
- Location: Hollywood, Florida, US
- Venue: Sportatorium
- Attendance: 28,800

Champions

Singles
- (South Africa) Greer Stevens

Doubles
- (United States) Tracy Austin / (Netherlands) Betty Stöve
← 1978 ·	Virginia Slims of Hollywood

The 1979 Avon Championships of Florida was a women's tennis tournament played on indoor carpet courts at the Sportatorium in Hollywood, Florida in the United States that was part of the 1979 Avon Championships circuit. It was the third and final edition of the tournament and was held from January 22 through January 28, 1979. Greer Stevens, seeded 15th, won the singles title and earned $24,000 first-prize money.

== Finals ==
=== Singles ===
(South Africa) Greer Stevens defeated (Australia) Dianne Fromholtz 6–4, 2–6, 6–4

- It was Stevens' 1st singles title of the year and the 4th of her career.

=== Doubles ===
(United States) Tracy Austin / (Netherlands) Betty Stöve defeated (United States) Rosie Casals / (Australia) Wendy Turnbull 6–2, 2–6, 6–2

== Prize money ==
Event	W	F	3rd	4th	QF	Round of 16	Round of 32
Singles	$24,000	$12,000	$6,500	$6,200	$3,000	$1,600	$600
