= Virginia Slims of Hollywood =

Defunct tennis tournament
- Event name: Virginia Slims of Hollywood (1977–78); Avon Championships of Florida (1979)
- Tour: WTA Tour (1977–79)
- Founded: 1977
- Abolished: 1979
- Editions: 3
- Surface: Carpet (i)

The Virginia Slims of Hollywood is a defunct WTA Tour affiliated women's tennis tournament played from 1977 to 1979. It was held in Hollywood, Florida in the United States and played on indoor carpet courts.

== Past finals ==
=== Singles ===
Year	Champions	Runners-up	Score
1977	(United States) Chris Evert	(Australia) Margaret Court	6–3, 6–4
1978	(Australia) Evonne Goolagong Cawley	(Australia) Wendy Turnbull	6–2, 6–3
1979	(South Africa) Greer Stevens	(Australia) Dianne Fromholtz	6–4, 2–6, 6–4

=== Doubles ===
Year	Champions	Runners-up	Score
1977	(Czechoslovakia) Martina Navratilova (Netherlands) Betty Stöve	(United States) Rosemary Casals (United States) Chris Evert	6–4, 3–6, 6–4
1978	(United States) Rosemary Casals (Australia) Wendy Turnbull	(France) Françoise Dürr (United Kingdom) Virginia Wade	6–2, 6–4
1979	(United States) Tracy Austin (Netherlands) Betty Stöve	(United States) Rosemary Casals (Australia) Wendy Turnbull	6–2, 2–6, 6–2
