= 1978 Virginia Slims of Hollywood =

Women's tennis tournament

- Date: January 9–15
- Edition: 2nd
- Category: Virginia Slims circuit
- Draw: 32S / 16D
- Prize money: $100,000
- Surface: Carpet (Sporteze) / indoor
- Location: Hollywood, Florida, US
- Venue: Sportatorium
- Attendance: 29,998

Champions

Singles
- (Australia) Evonne Goolagong Cawley

Doubles
- (United States) Rosie Casals / (Australia) Wendy Turnbull
← 1977 ·	Virginia Slims of Hollywood	· 1979 →

The 1978 Virginia Slims of Hollywood was a women's tennis tournament played on indoor carpet courts at the Sportatorium in Hollywood, Florida, United States, that was part of the 1978 Virginia Slims World Championship Series. It was the second edition of the tournament and was held from January 9 through January 15, 1978. Second-seeded Evonne Goolagong Cawley won the singles title and earned $20,000 first-prize money.

== Winners ==
=== Singles ===
(Australia) Evonne Goolagong Cawley defeated (Australia) Wendy Turnbull 6–2, 6–3

=== Doubles ===
(United States) Rosie Casals / (Australia) Wendy Turnbull defeated (France) Françoise Dürr / (United Kingdom) Virginia Wade 6–2, 6–4

== Prize money ==
Event	W	F	3rd	4th	QF	Round of 16	Round of 32
Singles	$20,000	$10,500	$6,300	$5,500	$2,800	$1,550	$850
