= Virginia Slims of Hawaii =

Defunct tennis tournament
- Event name: Virginia Slims of Hawaii
- Tour: WTA Tour
- Founded: 1973
- Abolished: 1973
- Surface: Hard

The Virginia Slims of Hawaii is a defunct WTA Tour affiliated women's tennis tournament played in 1973. It was held in Honolulu, Hawaii in the United States and played on outdoor hard courts.

== Past finals ==
=== Singles ===
Year	Champions	Runners-up	Score
1973	(United States) Billie Jean King	(Australia) Helen Gourlay	6–1, 6–1

=== Doubles ===
Year	Champions	Runners-up	Score
1973	(Australia) Kerry Harris (Australia) Kerry Reid	(Australia) Helen Gourlay (Australia) Karen Krantzcke	6–3, 3–6, 6–3
