= 1978 Toray Sillook Open =

- Date: 14–17 September
- Edition: 6th
- Category: Colgate Series (AAA)
- Draw: 32S
- Prize money: $75,000
- Surface: Carpet / indoor
- Location: Tokyo, Japan
- Venue: Yoyogi National Gymnasium

Champions

Singles
- (United Kingdom) Virginia Wade
← 1977 ·	Pan Pacific Open	· 1979 →

The 1978 Toray Sillook Open was a women's singles tennis tournament played on indoor carpet courts at Yoyogi National Gymnasium in Tokyo in Japan. The event was part of the AAA (Note: Tournaments with prize money for the women of at least $100,000.) category of the 1978 Colgate Series. It was the sixth edition of the tournament and was held from 14 September through 17 September 1978. First-seeded Virginia Wade won the title and earned $20,000 first-prize money.

== Finals ==
=== Singles ===
(United Kingdom) Virginia Wade defeated (Netherlands) Betty Stöve 6–4, 7–6^{(7–2)}

- It was Wade's 2nd title of the year and the 54th of her career.

== Prize money ==
Event	W	F	3rd	4th	Round of 16	Round of 32
Singles	$20,000	$10,000	$6,250	$5,500	$2,500	$1,500
