= 1976 Toray Sillook Open =

- Date: 28 September – 2 October
- Edition: 4th
- Draw: 8S
- Prize money: $50,000
- Surface: Carpet / indoor
- Location: Tokyo, Japan
- Venue: Nichi Dai University Auditorium; Yoyogi National Gymnasium

Champions

Singles
- (Netherlands) Betty Stöve
| ← 1975 · | Pan Pacific Open | · 1977 → |

The 1976 Toray Sillook Open was a women's tennis tournament played on indoor carpet courts in Tokyo, Japan that was a non-tour event, independent of the 1976 WTA Tour. It was the fourth edition of the tournament and was held from 28 September through 2 October, 1976. The first round was played at the Nichi Dai University Auditorium while the semifinals and final were held at the Yoyogi National Gymnasium. The singles event was the only competition held and was won by unseeded Betty Stöve who earned $15,000 first-prize money.

== Finals ==
=== Singles ===
(Netherlands) Betty Stöve defeated (Australia) Margaret Court 1–6, 6–4, 6–3

== Prize money ==
| Event | W | F | 3rd | 4th | QF |
| Singles | $15,000 | $12,000 | $7,000 | $6,000 | $3,250 |
