= 1976 Toyota Women's Classic =

- Date: 7–12 December
- Edition: 14th
- Category: Colgate Series
- Draw: 32S/16D
- Prize money: $50,000
- Surface: Grass
- Location: Melbourne, Australia
- Venue: Kooyong

Champions

Singles
- (Australia) Margaret Court

Doubles
- (Australia) Margaret Court / (Netherlands) Betty Stöve
- Victorian Championships

The 1976 Toyota Women's Classic, was a women's tennis tournament played on outdoor grass courts at Kooyong in Melbourne in Australia. The event was part of the 1976–1977 Colgate International Series. It was the 14th edition of the tournament and was held from 7 December through 12 December 1976. Sixth-seeded Margaret Court won the singles title, the 191st and final of her career, and earned $9,000 first-prize money.

== Finals ==
=== Singles ===
(Australia) Margaret Court defeated (United Kingdom) Sue Barker 6–2, 6–2

- It was Court's 1st singles title of the year and the 191st and last of her career.

=== Doubles ===
(Australia) Margaret Court / (Netherlands) Betty Stöve defeated (South Africa) Linky Boshoff / (South Africa) Ilana Kloss 6–2, 6–4

== Prize money ==
Event	W	F	SF	QF	Round of 16	Round of 32
Singles	$9,000	$5,000	$2,400	$1,450	$800	$400
