= 1977 Wightman Cup =

International women's tennis competition

Details
- Edition: 49th

Champion
- Winning nation: United States

The 1977 Wightman Cup was the 49th edition of the annual women's team tennis competition between the United States and Great Britain. It was held at the Oakland-Alameda County Coliseum in Oakland, California in the United States.

United States
7
Oakland-Alameda County Coliseum, Oakland, California, United States
1977
Hard (Indoors)

Great Britain
0

			1	2	3
1	(United States) (United Kingdom)	Chris Evert; Virginia Wade	7; 5	7; 6
2	(United States) (United Kingdom)	Billie Jean King; Sue Barker	6; 1	6; 4
3	(United States) (United Kingdom)	Rosemary Casals; Michelle Tyler	6; 2	3; 6	6; 4
4	(United States) (United Kingdom)	Billie Jean King / JoAnne Russell; Lesley Charles / Sue Mappin	6; 0	6; 1
5	(United States) (United Kingdom)	Billie Jean King; Virginia Wade	6; 4	3; 6	8; 6
6	(United States) (United Kingdom)	Chris Evert; Sue Barker	6; 1	6; 2
7	(United States) (United Kingdom)	Rosemary Casals / Chris Evert; Sue Barker / Virginia Wade	6; 2	6; 4
