= Dallas Indoor Invitational =

Defunct tennis tournament
- Tour: ILTF World Circuit (1961–66)
- Founded: 1961; 65 years ago
- Abolished: 1966; 60 years ago
- Editions: 7
- Location: Dallas, Texas, United States
- Surface: Hard / indoor

The Dallas Indoor Invitational was a combined indoor hard court tennis tournament founded in 1961. It was played in Dallas, Texas, United States until 1966.

== Finals ==
=== Men's Singles ===
Year	Winner	Runner up	Score
1963	(United States) Ham Richardson	(United States) Chuck McKinley	8-10, 6-1, 6-4
1964	(United States) Dennis Ralston	(United States) Ron Holmberg	7-5, 6-2
1965	(United States) Ron Holmberg	(Mexico) Rafael Osuna	6-3 6-3
1966	(United States) Dennis Ralston (2)	(United States) Ron Holmberg	6-4, 6-2

=== Women's Singles ===
Year	Winner	Runner up	Score
1963	(United States) Karen Susman	(United States) Justina Bricka	6-3 6-0
1964	(United States) Nancy Richey	(United States) Billie Jean Moffitt,	6-2 7-5
1965	(United States) Carol Aucamp	(United States) Mary Ann Eisel	6-3 6-2
1966	(United States) Billie Jean King	(United States) Nancy Richey	7-5, 3-6, 6-3
