= List of French Open singles finalists during the Open Era =

French Open singles finalists
- Location: Paris; France
- Created: 1968 (57 finals, including 2024)
- Men's most: 14: Rafael Nadal
- Men's most consecutive: 5: Rafael Nadal
- Women's most: 9: Chris Evert; Steffi Graf
- Women's most consecutive: 4: Chris Evert; Martina Navratilova; Steffi Graf
- Most meetings: Men's (4 times): Nadal vs. Federer (4–0); Women's (4 times): Evert vs. Navratilova (3–1)
- Official website

The French Open is a Grand Slam tier tennis tournament held in Paris at the Stade Roland Garros in the administrative district of XVI^{e}. The tournament was first held in 1891 for the men and 1897 for the women's, and has only ceased being played during the two world wars. This tournament first became part of the Open Era in 1968, which was the first major tournament to open up to professional tennis players in their competition.

The men who have reached the final at least four times during the Open Era are: Björn Borg, Guillermo Vilas, Ivan Lendl, Mats Wilander, Rafael Nadal, Roger Federer, and Novak Djokovic. Borg won all six of his finals from 1974 to 1981. Vilas won only one of his four finals from 1975 to 1982. Lendl and Wilander dominated the 1980s, with at least one appearing in the final each year from 1981 to 1988; both men won three out of five finals. Nadal has won all 14 of his finals from 2005 to the present day; he has not appeared in the final in 2009, 2015, 2016 and 2021 only. Federer has appeared in five finals from 2006 to 2011, winning only one and missing the final in 2010. Djokovic has appeared in seven finals from 2012 to 2023, winning three. Federer won the career Grand Slam at this tournament in 2009, while Djokovic won the career Grand Slam at this tournament three times, in 2016, 2021, and 2023.

The women who have reached the final at least four times during the Open Era are: Chris Evert, Martina Navratilova, Steffi Graf, Arantxa Sánchez Vicario, Monica Seles, Justine Henin, Serena Williams, and Iga Świątek. Evert won seven of her nine finals from 1973 through 1986. Navratilova appeared in six finals; her first in 1975, then five from 1982 through 1987. Graf won seven of her nine finals. From 1987 through 1996, she made the final each year except 1991 and 1994; she won her last final in 1999. Her 1988 win was part of her calendar-year Grand Slam. Sánchez Vicario appeared in six finals from 1989 through 1998, winning three. Seles won three straight finals from 1990 to 1992; she was stabbed in 1993 and only appeared in one more final (1998). Henin appeared in four finals from 2003 to 2007, winning all four and missing the final in 2004. Williams appeared in four finals; her first in 2002, then three from 2013 through 2016. Swiatek has won four finals from 2020 to 2024, winning all four and missing the final in 2021.

== Men ==
The French Open men's singles finals have been competed in by 52 competitors from 22 separate nationalities over the 54 year time period this event has been staged. The most dominant finalist nations are Spain and Sweden, other successful competing nations are the United States, Czechoslovakia, and Argentina.

- Winners indicated in **bold**.

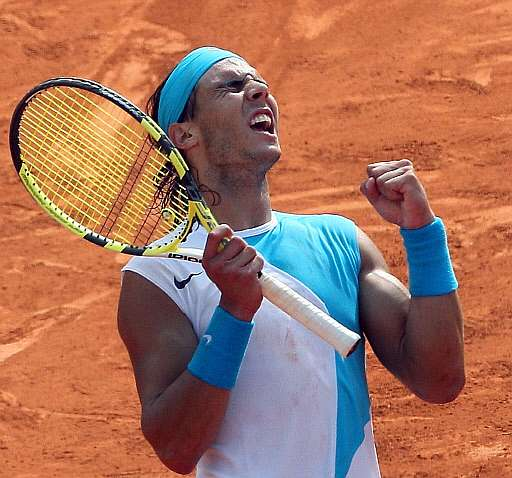
Rafael Nadal, a record fourteen-time finalist (all wins).

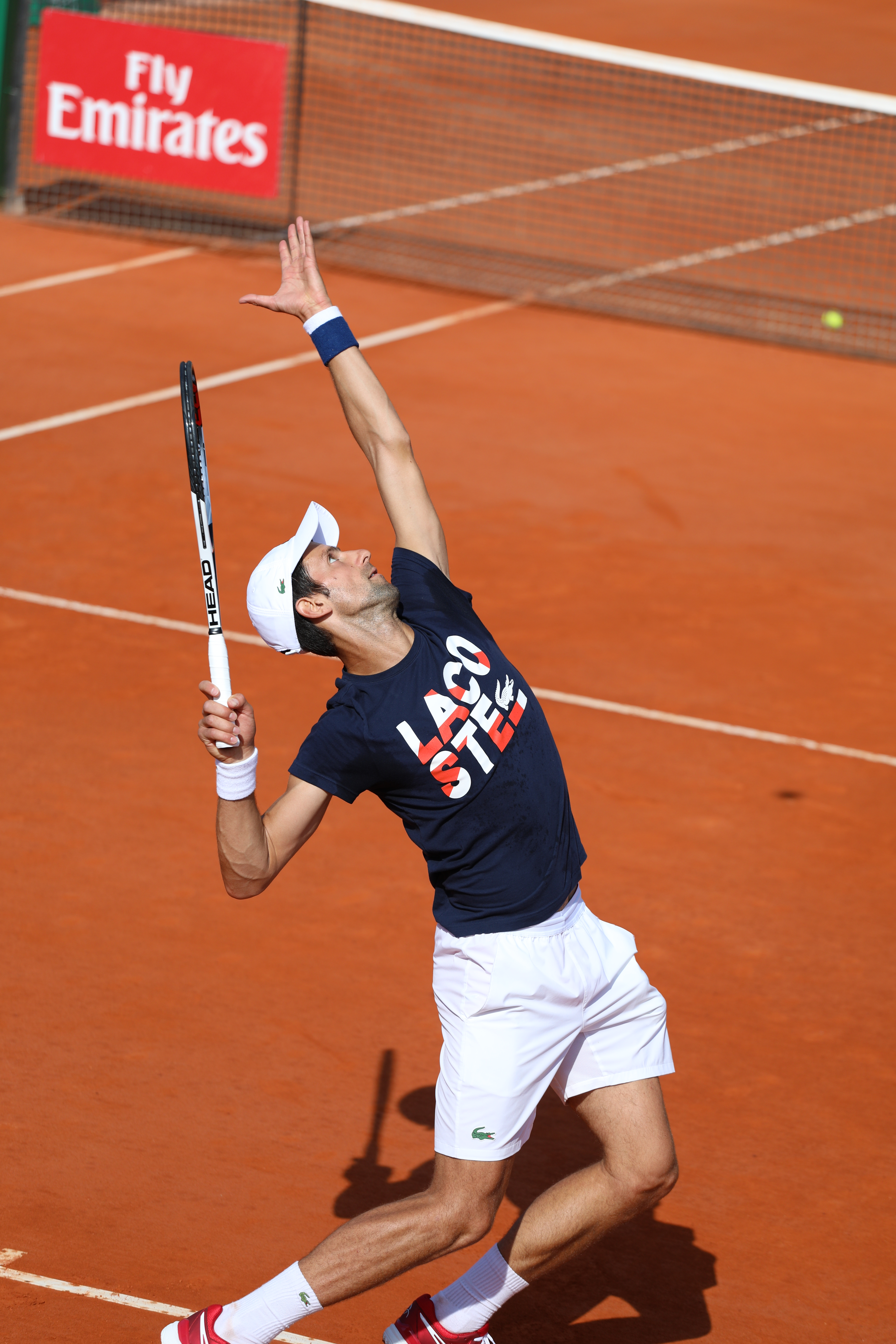
Novak Djokovic, a seven-time finalist (three wins).

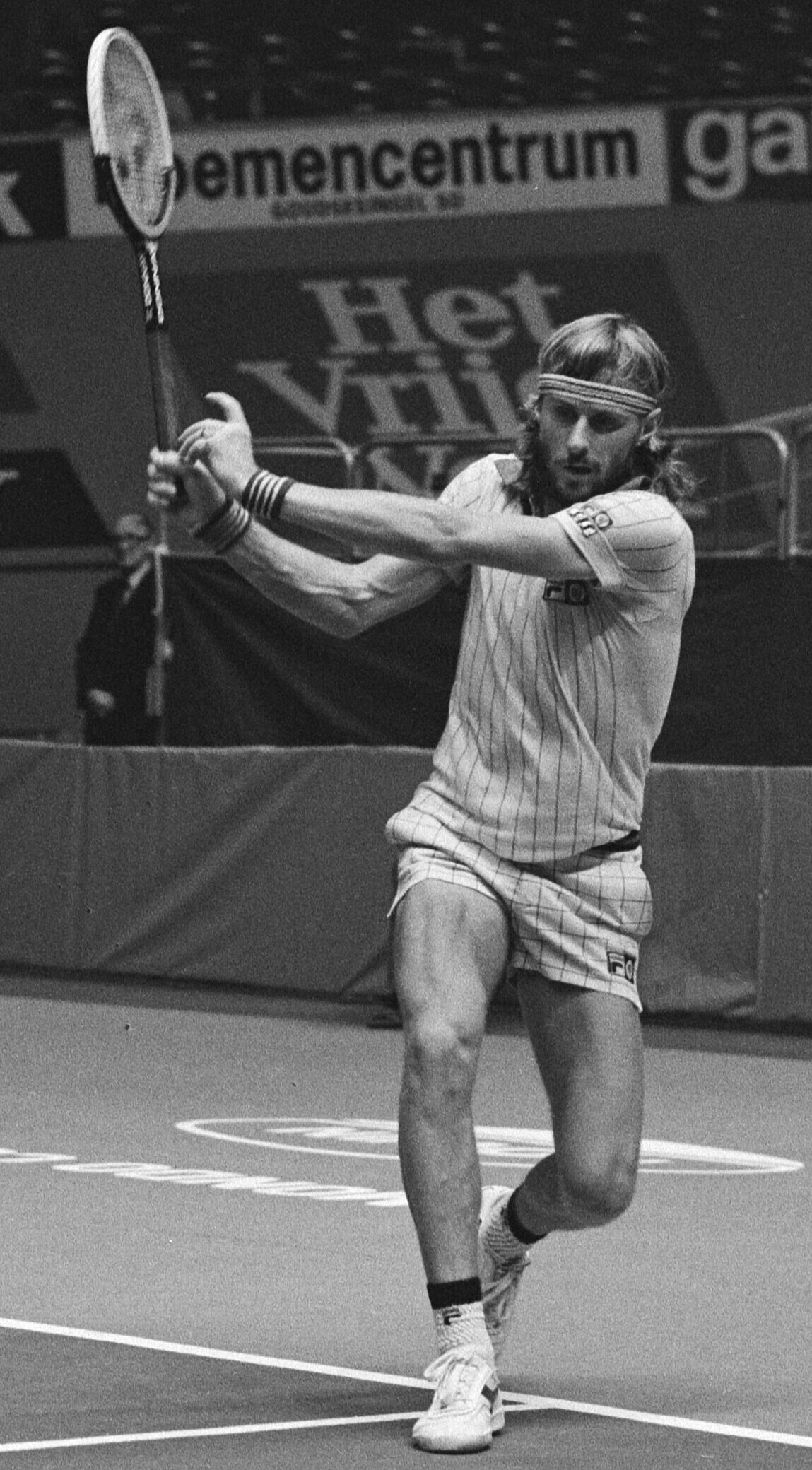
Björn Borg, a six-time finalist (all wins).

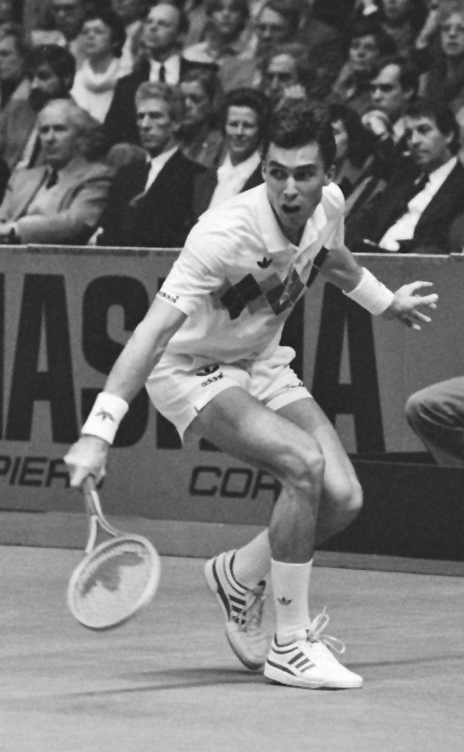
Ivan Lendl, a five-time finalist (three wins).

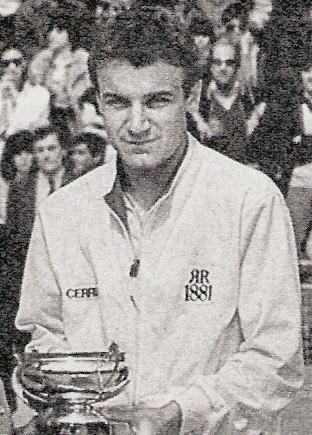
Mats Wilander, a five-time finalist (three wins).

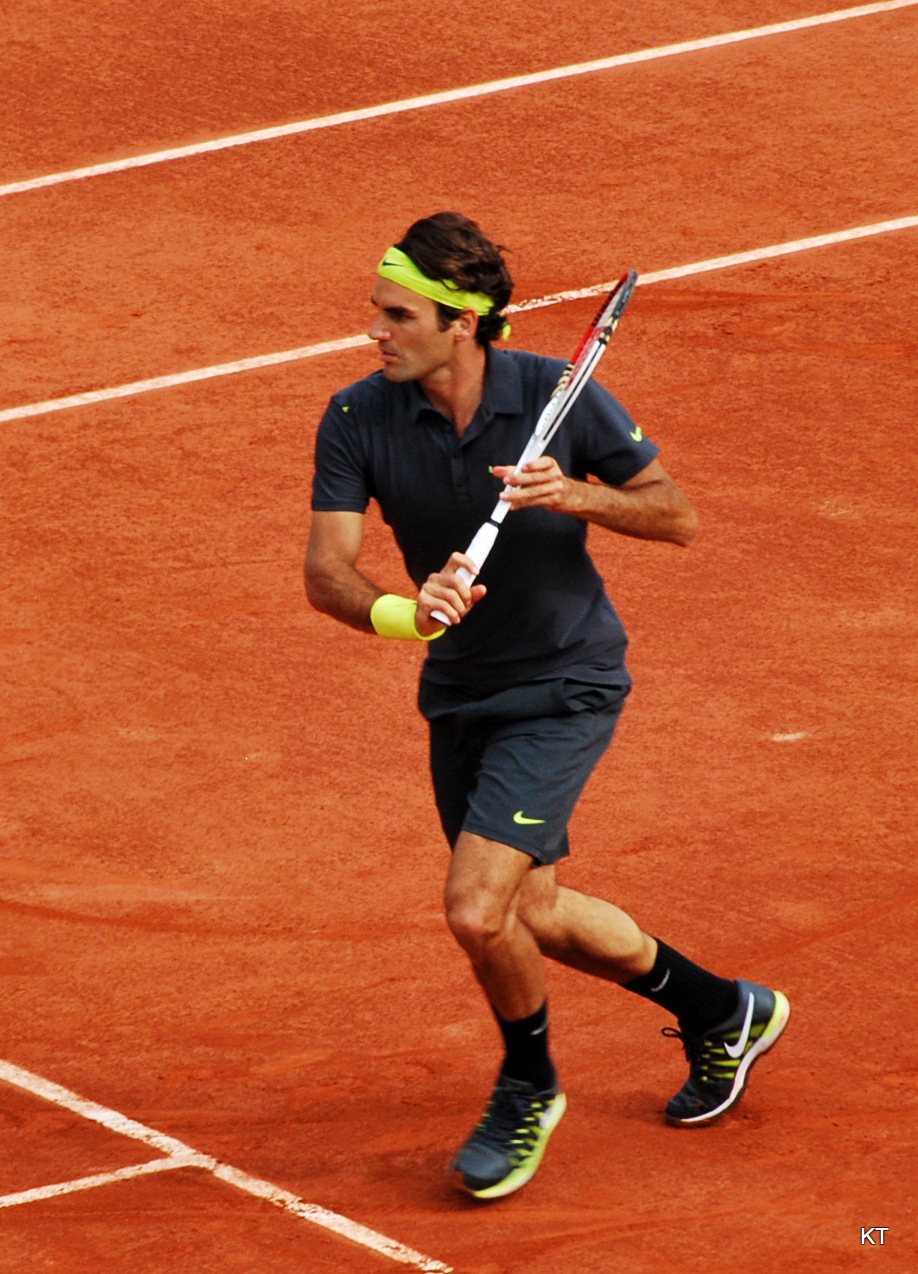
Roger Federer, a five-time finalist (one win).

| Country | Player | Finals | Win-Loss | Year(s) |
|---|---|---|---|---|
| ESP | Rafael Nadal | 14 | 14–0 | **2005**, **2006**, **2007**, **2008**, **2010**, **2011**, **2012**, **2013**, **2014**, **2017**, **2018**, **2019**, **2020**, **2022** |
| SRB | Novak Djokovic | 7 | 3–4 | 2012, 2014, 2015, **2016**, 2020, **2021**, **2023** |
| SWE | Björn Borg | 6 | 6–0 | **1974**, **1975**, **1978**, **1979**, **1980**, **1981** |
| CZS | Ivan Lendl | 5 | 3–2 | 1981, **1984**, 1985, **1986**, **1987** |
| SWE | Mats Wilander | 5 | 3–2 | **1982**, 1983, **1985**, 1987, **1988** |
| SUI | Roger Federer | 5 | 1–4 | 2006, 2007, 2008, **2009**, 2011 |
| ARG | Guillermo Vilas | 4 | 1–3 | 1975, **1977**, 1978, 1982 |
| BRA | Gustavo Kuerten | 3 | 3–0 | **1997**, **2000**, **2001** |
| USA | Jim Courier | 3 | 2–1 | **1991**, **1992**, 1993 |
| ESP | Sergi Bruguera | 3 | 2–1 | **1993**, **1994**, 1997 |
| USA | Andre Agassi | 3 | 1–2 | 1990, 1991, **1999** |
| CZS | Jan Kodeš | 2 | 2–0 | **1970**, **1971** |
| ESP | Carlos Alcaraz | 2 | 2–0 | **2024**, **2025** |
| AUS | Ken Rosewall | 2 | 1–1 | **1968**, 1969 |
| AUS | Rod Laver | 2 | 1–1 | 1968, **1969** |
| ROU | Ilie Năstase | 2 | 1–1 | 1971, **1973** |
| USA | Michael Chang | 2 | 1–1 | **1989**, 1995 |
| ESP | Juan Carlos Ferrero | 2 | 1–1 | 2002, **2003** |
| SUI | Stan Wawrinka | 2 | 1–1 | **2015**, 2017 |
| GER | Alexander Zverev | 2 | 1–1 | 2024, **2026** |
| ESP | Àlex Corretja | 2 | 0–2 | 1998, 2001 |
| SWE | Robin Söderling | 2 | 0–2 | 2009, 2010 |
| AUT | Dominic Thiem | 2 | 0–2 | 2018, 2019 |
| NOR | Casper Ruud | 2 | 0–2 | 2022, 2023 |
| ESP | Andrés Gimeno | 1 | 1–0 | **1972** |
| ITA | Adriano Panatta | 1 | 1–0 | **1976** |
| FRA | Yannick Noah | 1 | 1–0 | **1983** |
| ECU | Andrés Gómez | 1 | 1–0 | **1990** |
| AUT | Thomas Muster | 1 | 1–0 | **1995** |
| RUS | Yevgeny Kafelnikov | 1 | 1–0 | **1996** |
| ESP | Carlos Moyá | 1 | 1–0 | **1998** |
| ESP | Albert Costa | 1 | 1–0 | **2002** |
| ARG | Gastón Gaudio | 1 | 1–0 | **2004** |
| YUG | Željko Franulović | 1 | 0–1 | 1970 |
| FRA | Patrick Proisy | 1 | 0–1 | 1972 |
| YUG | Nikola Pilić | 1 | 0–1 | 1973 |
| ESP | Manuel Orantes | 1 | 0–1 | 1974 |
| USA | Harold Solomon | 1 | 0–1 | 1976 |
| USA | Brian Gottfried | 1 | 0–1 | 1977 |
| PAR | Víctor Pecci | 1 | 0–1 | 1979 |
| USA | Vitas Gerulaitis | 1 | 0–1 | 1980 |
| USA | John McEnroe | 1 | 0–1 | 1984 |
| SWE | Mikael Pernfors | 1 | 0–1 | 1986 |
| FRA | Henri Leconte | 1 | 0–1 | 1988 |
| SWE | Stefan Edberg | 1 | 0–1 | 1989 |
| CZS | Petr Korda | 1 | 0–1 | 1992 |
| ESP | Alberto Berasategui | 1 | 0–1 | 1994 |
| GER | Michael Stich | 1 | 0–1 | 1996 |
| UKR | Andrei Medvedev | 1 | 0–1 | 1999 |
| SWE | Magnus Norman | 1 | 0–1 | 2000 |
| NED | Martin Verkerk | 1 | 0–1 | 2003 |
| ARG | Guillermo Coria | 1 | 0–1 | 2004 |
| ARG | Mariano Puerta | 1 | 0–1 | 2005 |
| ESP | David Ferrer | 1 | 0–1 | 2013 |
| GBR | Andy Murray | 1 | 0–1 | 2016 |
| GRE | Stefanos Tsitsipas | 1 | 0–1 | 2021 |
| ITA | Jannik Sinner | 1 | 0–1 | 2025 |

=== Most recent final ===
| Year | Country | Winner | Country | Runner-up |
|---|---|---|---|---|
| 2025 | ESP | Carlos Alcaraz | ITA | Jannik Sinner |

=== Multiple-time opponents in the Open Era ===
| Opponents | | Record | Finals meetings |
|---|---|---|---|
| (Australia) Rod Laver | (Australia) Ken Rosewall | 1–1 | 1968 (Rosewall), 1969 (Laver) |
| (Sweden) **Björn Borg** | (Argentina) Guillermo Vilas | 2–0 | 1975, 1978 |
| (Czechoslovakia) Ivan Lendl | (Sweden) Mats Wilander | 1–1 | 1985 (Wilander), 1987 (Lendl) |
| (Spain) **Rafael Nadal** | (Switzerland) Roger Federer | 4–0 | 2006, 2007, 2008, 2011 |
| (Spain) **Rafael Nadal** | (Serbia) Novak Djokovic | 3–0 | 2012, 2014, 2020 |
| (Spain) **Rafael Nadal** | (Austria) Dominic Thiem | 2–0 | 2018, 2019 |

=== Most consecutive finals in the Open Era ===
^ Active streak indicated in bold.

| Player | Number | Years | Results | |
| Player | Number | Years | Won | Lost |
|---|---|---|---|---|
| (Spain) Rafael Nadal | 5 | 2010–14 | 5 | 0 |
| (Sweden) Björn Borg | 4 | 1978–81 | 4 | 0 |
| (Czechoslovakia) Ivan Lendl | 4 | 1984–87 | 3 | 1 |
| (Spain) Rafael Nadal (2) | 4 | 2005–08 | 4 | 0 |
| (Switzerland) Roger Federer | 4 | 2006–09 | 1 | 3 |
| (Spain) Rafael Nadal | 4 | 2017–20 | 4 | 0 |
| (United States) Jim Courier | 3 | 1991–93 | 2 | 1 |
| (Serbia) Novak Djokovic | 3 | 2014–16 | 1 | 2 |
| (Australia) Rod Laver | 2 | 1968–69 | 1 | 1 |
| (Australia) Ken Rosewall | 2 | 1968–69 | 1 | 1 |
| (Czechoslovakia) Jan Kodeš | 2 | 1970–71 | 2 | 0 |
| (Sweden) Björn Borg (2) | 2 | 1974–75 | 2 | 0 |
| (Argentina) Guillermo Vilas | 2 | 1977–78 | 1 | 1 |
| (Sweden) Mats Wilander | 2 | 1982–83 | 1 | 1 |
| (Sweden) Mats Wilander (2) | 2 | 1987–88 | 1 | 1 |
| (United States) Andre Agassi | 2 | 1990–91 | 0 | 2 |
| (Spain) Sergi Bruguera | 2 | 1993–94 | 2 | 0 |
| (Brazil) Gustavo Kuerten | 2 | 2000–01 | 2 | 0 |
| (Spain) Juan Carlos Ferrero | 2 | 2002–03 | 1 | 1 |
| (Sweden) Robin Söderling | 2 | 2009–10 | 0 | 2 |
| (Austria) Dominic Thiem | 2 | 2018–19 | 0 | 2 |
| (Serbia) Novak Djokovic (2) | 2 | 2020–21 | 1 | 1 |
| (Norway) Casper Ruud | 2 | 2022–23 | 0 | 2 |
| (Spain) Carlos Alcaraz | 2 | 2024–25 | 2 | 0 |

== Women ==
The French Open women's singles finals have consisted of 54 competitors from 18 nationalities in the 54 meetings that have taken place at the event. The eras of dominance are the following: United States and Yugoslavia in different eras, Australia in the 1970s, Germany and Spain in the 1980s and 1990s, and Belgium and Russia in the 2000s.

- Winners indicated in **bold**.

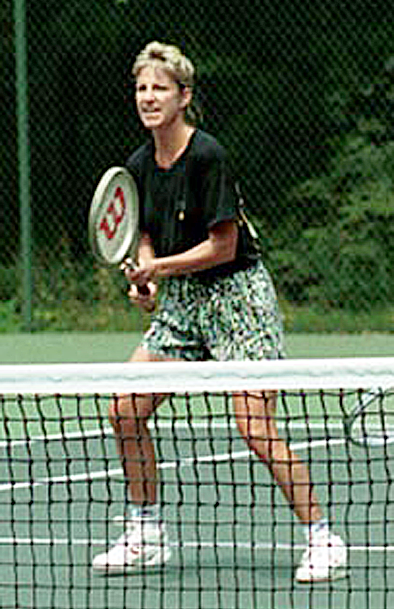
Chris Evert, a nine-time finalist (seven wins).

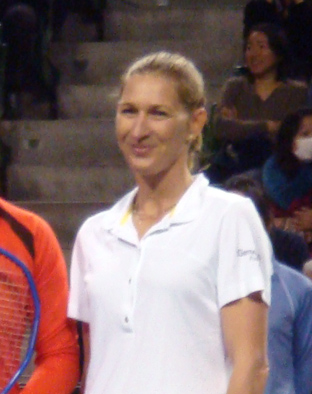
Steffi Graf, a nine-time finalist (six wins).

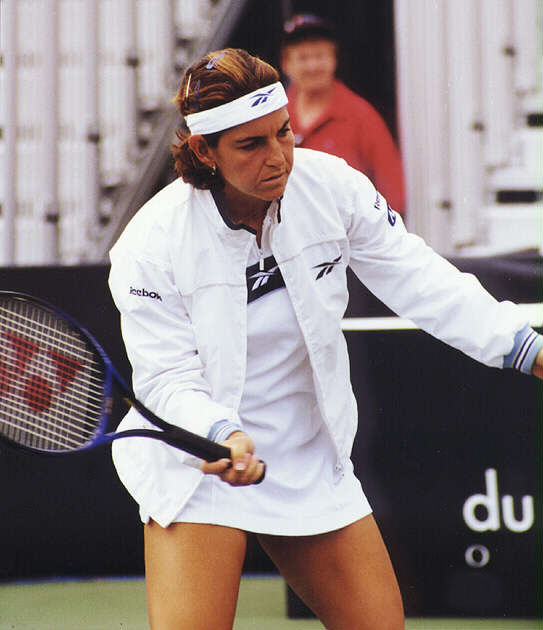
Arantxa Sánchez Vicario, a six-time finalist (three wins).

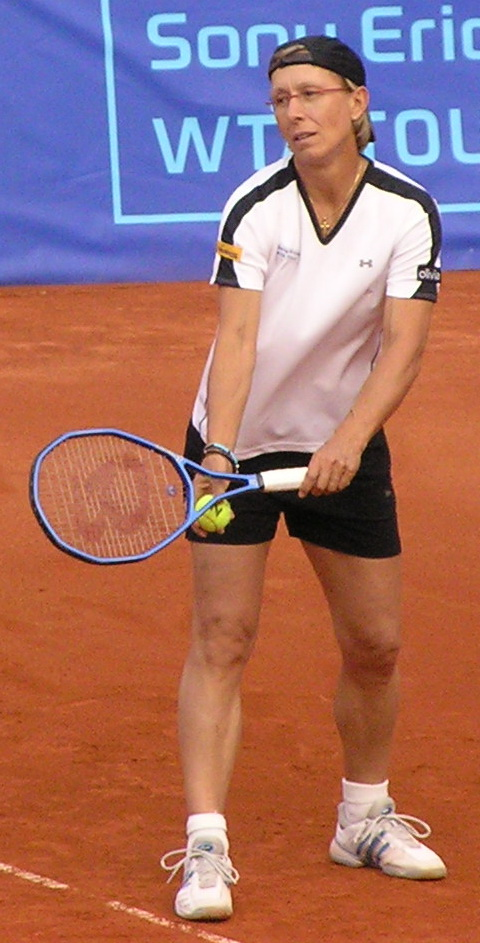
Martina Navratilova, a six-time finalist (two wins).

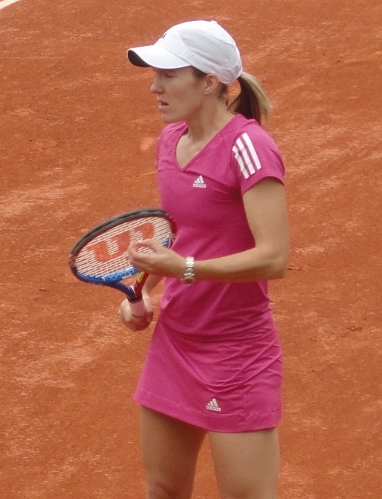
Justine Henin, a four-time finalist (all wins).

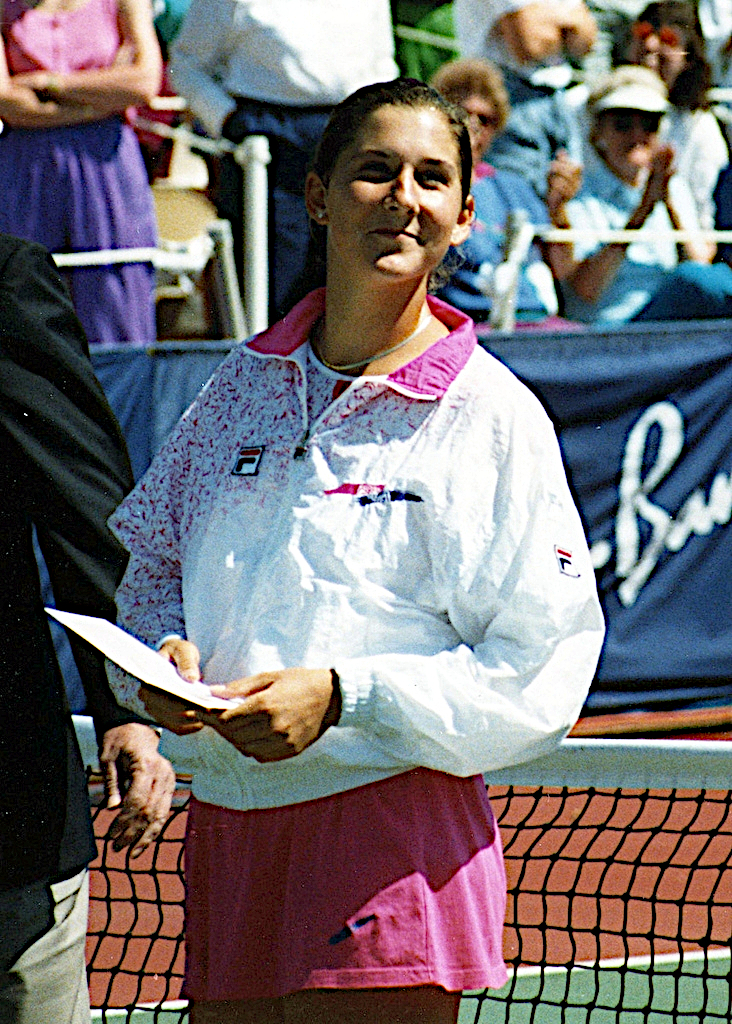
Monica Seles, a four-time finalist (three wins).

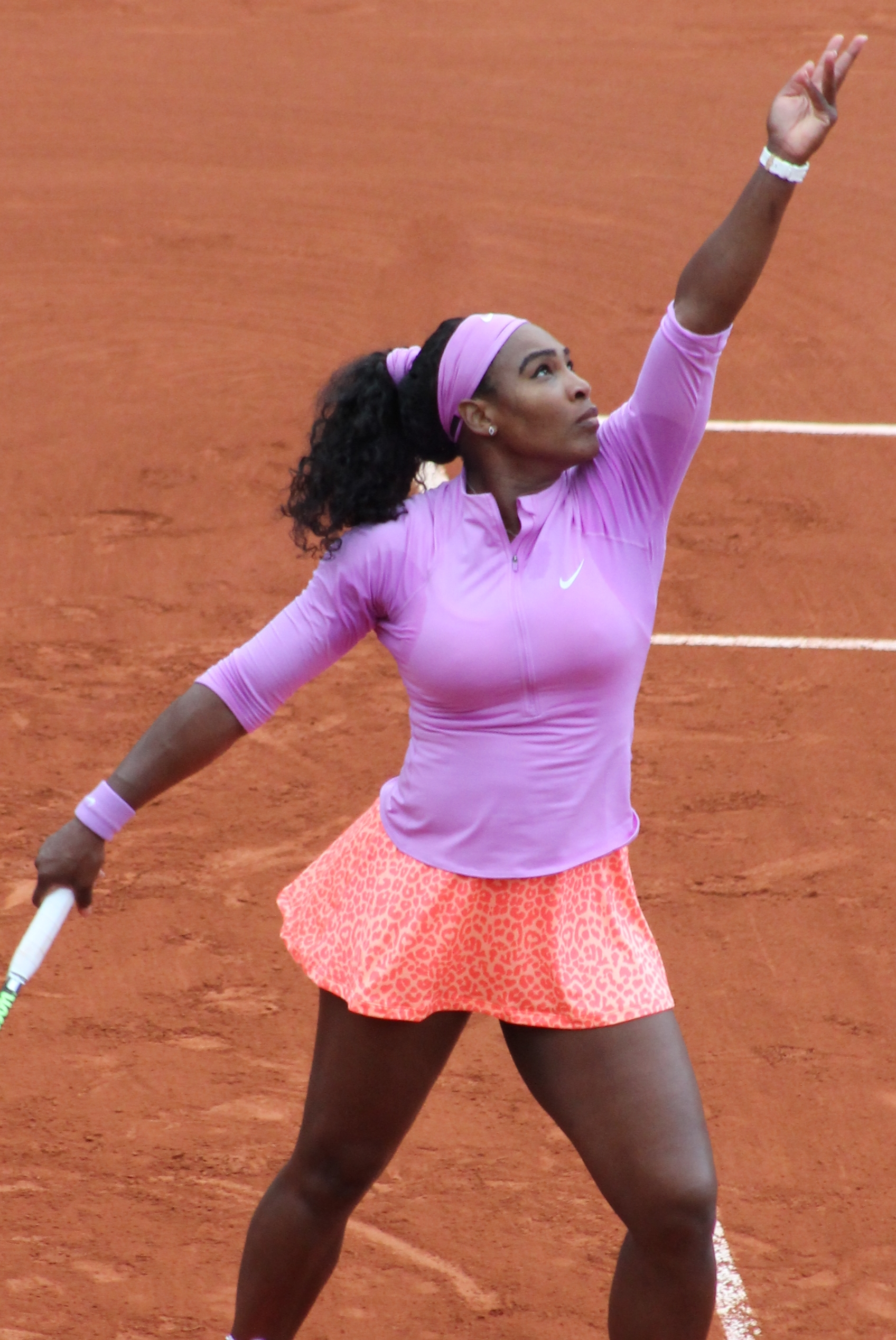
Serena Williams, a four-time finalist (three wins).

| Country | Player | Appearances | Win-Loss | Year(s) |
|---|---|---|---|---|
| USA | Chris Evert | 9 | 7–2 | 1973, **1974**, **1975**, **1979**, **1980**, **1983**, 1984, **1985**, **1986** |
| GER | Steffi Graf | 9 | 6–3 | **1987**, **1988**, 1989, 1990, 1992, **1993**, **1995**, **1996**, **1999** |
| ESP | Arantxa Sánchez Vicario | 6 | 3–3 | **1989**, 1991, **1994**, 1995, 1996, **1998** |
| USA^{[a]} | Martina Navratilova | 6 | 2–4 | 1975, **1982**, **1984**, 1985, 1986, 1987 |
| BEL | Justine Henin | 4 | 4–0 | **2003**, **2005**, **2006**, **2007** |
| POL | Iga Świątek | 4 | 4–0 | **2020**, **2022**, **2023**, **2024** |
| YUG^{[b]} | Monica Seles | 4 | 3–1 | **1990**, **1991**, **1992**, 1998 |
| USA | Serena Williams | 4 | 3–1 | **2002**, **2013**, **2015**, 2016 |
| AUS | Margaret Court | 3 | 3–0 | **1969**, **1970**, **1973** |
| RUS | Maria Sharapova | 3 | 2–1 | **2012**, 2013, **2014** |
| YUG | Mima Jaušovec | 3 | 1–2 | **1977**, 1978, 1983 |
| ROU | Simona Halep | 3 | 1–2 | 2014, 2017, **2018** |
| FRA | Mary Pierce | 3 | 1–2 | 1994, **2000**, 2005 |
| AUS | Evonne Goolagong | 2 | 1–1 | **1971**, 1972 |
| ROU | Virginia Ruzici | 2 | 1–1 | **1978**, 1980 |
| SRB | Ana Ivanovic | 2 | 1–1 | 2007, **2008** |
| RUS | Svetlana Kuznetsova | 2 | 1–1 | 2006, **2009** |
| ITA | Francesca Schiavone | 2 | 1–1 | **2010**, 2011 |
| USA | Coco Gauff | 2 | 1–1 | 2022, **2025** |
| UK | Ann Haydon-Jones | 2 | 0–2 | 1968, 1969 |
| SUI | Martina Hingis | 2 | 0–2 | 1997, 1999 |
| BEL | Kim Clijsters | 2 | 0–2 | 2001, 2003 |
| RUS | Dinara Safina | 2 | 0–2 | 2008, 2009 |
| USA | Nancy Richey | 1 | 1–0 | **1968** |
| USA | Billie Jean King | 1 | 1–0 | **1972** |
| UK | Sue Barker | 1 | 1–0 | **1976** |
| CZS | Hana Mandlíková | 1 | 1–0 | **1981** |
| CRO | Iva Majoli | 1 | 1–0 | **1997** |
| USA | Jennifer Capriati | 1 | 1–0 | **2001** |
| RUS | Anastasia Myskina | 1 | 1–0 | **2004** |
| CHN | Li Na | 1 | 1–0 | **2011** |
| ESP | Garbiñe Muguruza | 1 | 1–0 | **2016** |
| LAT | Jeļena Ostapenko | 1 | 1–0 | **2017** |
| AUS | Ashleigh Barty | 1 | 1–0 | **2019** |
| CZE | Barbora Krejčíková | 1 | 1–0 | **2021** |
| FRG | Helga Niessen Masthoff | 1 | 0–1 | 1970 |
| AUS | Helen Gourlay | 1 | 0–1 | 1971 |
| SUN | Olga Morozova | 1 | 0–1 | 1974 |
| CZS | Renáta Tomanová | 1 | 0–1 | 1976 |
| ROU | Florența Mihai | 1 | 0–1 | 1977 |
| AUS | Wendy Turnbull | 1 | 0–1 | 1979 |
| FRG | Sylvia Hanika | 1 | 0–1 | 1981 |
| USA | Andrea Jaeger | 1 | 0–1 | 1982 |
| SUN | Natalia Zvereva | 1 | 0–1 | 1988 |
| USA | Mary Joe Fernández | 1 | 0–1 | 1993 |
| ESP | Conchita Martínez | 1 | 0–1 | 2000 |
| USA | Venus Williams | 1 | 0–1 | 2002 |
| RUS | Elena Dementieva | 1 | 0–1 | 2004 |
| AUS | Samantha Stosur | 1 | 0–1 | 2010 |
| ITA | Sara Errani | 1 | 0–1 | 2012 |
| CZE | Lucie Šafářová | 1 | 0–1 | 2015 |
| USA | Sloane Stephens | 1 | 0–1 | 2018 |
| CZE | Markéta Vondroušová | 1 | 0–1 | 2019 |
| USA | Sofia Kenin | 1 | 0–1 | 2020 |
| RUS | Anastasia Pavlyuchenkova | 1 | 0–1 | 2021 |
| CZE | Karolína Muchová | 1 | 0–1 | 2023 |
| ITA | Jasmine Paolini | 1 | 0–1 | 2024 |
| BLR | Aryna Sabalenka | 1 | 0–1 | 2025 |

=== Most recent final ===
| Year | Country | Winner | Country | Runner-up |
|---|---|---|---|---|
| 2025 | USA | **Coco Gauff** | BLR | Aryna Sabalenka |

=== Multiple-time opponents in the Open Era ===
| Opponents | | Record | Finals meetings |
|---|---|---|---|
| (United States) **Chris Evert** | (Czechoslovakia) / (United States) Martina Navratilova | 3–1 | 1975 (Evert), 1984 (Navratilova), 1985 (Evert), 1986 (Evert) |
| (Socialist Federal Republic of Yugoslavia) **Monica Seles** | (Germany) Steffi Graf | 2–0 | 1990, 1992 |
| (Germany) **Steffi Graf** | (Spain) Arantxa Sánchez Vicario | 2–1 | 1989 (Sánchez Vicario), 1995 (Graf), 1996 (Graf) |
| (Socialist Federal Republic of Yugoslavia) / (United States) Monica Seles | (Spain) Arantxa Sánchez Vicario | 1–1 | 1991 (Seles), 1998 (Vicario) |

=== Most consecutive finals in the Open Era ===
^ Active streak indicated in bold.

| Player | Number | Years | Results | |
| Player | Number | Years | Won | Lost |
|---|---|---|---|---|
| (United States) Chris Evert | 4 | 1983–86 | 3 | 1 |
| (United States) Martina Navratilova | 4 | 1984–87 | 1 | 3 |
| (Germany) Steffi Graf | 4 | 1987–90 | 2 | 2 |
| (United States) Chris Evert (2) | 3 | 1973–75 | 2 | 1 |
| (Socialist Federal Republic of Yugoslavia) Monica Seles | 3 | 1990–92 | 3 | 0 |
| (Spain) Arantxa Sánchez Vicario | 3 | 1994–96 | 1 | 2 |
| (Belgium) Justine Henin | 3 | 2005–07 | 3 | 0 |
| (Russia) Maria Sharapova | 3 | 2012–14 | 2 | 1 |
| (Poland) **Iga Świątek** | 3 | 2022–24 | 3 | 0 |
| (United Kingdom) Ann Haydon-Jones | 2 | 1968–69 | 0 | 2 |
| (Australia) Margaret Court | 2 | 1969–70 | 2 | 0 |
| (Australia) Evonne Goolagong | 2 | 1971–72 | 1 | 1 |
| (Socialist Federal Republic of Yugoslavia) Mima Jaušovec | 2 | 1977–78 | 1 | 1 |
| (United States) Chris Evert (3) | 2 | 1979–80 | 2 | 0 |
| (Germany) Steffi Graf (2) | 2 | 1992–93 | 1 | 1 |
| (Germany) Steffi Graf (3) | 2 | 1995–96 | 2 | 0 |
| (Serbia) Ana Ivanovic | 2 | 2007–08 | 1 | 1 |
| (Russia) Dinara Safina | 2 | 2008–09 | 0 | 2 |
| (Italy) Francesca Schiavone | 2 | 2010–11 | 1 | 1 |
| (United States) Serena Williams | 2 | 2015–16 | 1 | 1 |
| (Romania) Simona Halep | 2 | 2017–18 | 1 | 1 |

== See also ==
- List of Australian Open singles finalists during the Open Era
- List of Wimbledon singles finalists during the Open Era
- List of US Open singles finalists during the Open Era

== Notes ==
- ^{A} Martina Navratilova was born in Czechoslovakia but lost her citizenship in 1975. She became a United States citizen in 1981. Her Czech citizenship was restored in 2008.
- ^{B} Monica Seles was born in Yugoslavia but became a United States citizen in 1994.
