= List of Wimbledon singles finalists during the Open Era =

Wimbledon Championships (Open Era) Singles Finalists
- Location: London; United Kingdom
- Created: 1968 (53 finals, including 2021)
- Men's most: 12: Roger Federer
- Men's most consecutive: 7: Roger Federer
- Women's most: 12: Martina Navratilova
- Women's most consecutive: 9: Martina Navratilova
- Most meetings: Men's (3 times): Edberg vs. Becker (2–1); Federer vs. Roddick (3–0); Federer vs. Nadal (2–1); Djokovic vs. Federer (3–0); Women's (5 times): Navratilova vs. Evert (5–0)
- Official website

Wimbledon is a Grand Slam tennis tournament held in Wimbledon, England, United Kingdom at the All England Lawn Tennis and Croquet Club in the area of SW19. Since 1968, this tournament has been open to professionals, and it joined the Open Era of tennis.

The men who have reached the final at least five times during the open era are Jimmy Connors, Björn Borg, John McEnroe, Boris Becker, Pete Sampras, Roger Federer, Rafael Nadal, and Novak Djokovic. Connors reached the final six times between 1974 and 1984 but won only two titles. Borg reached six consecutive finals between 1976 and 1981 and won all but the last final. McEnroe reached five consecutive finals from 1980 through 1984, and won three titles. Becker won three titles out of seven finals between 1985 and 1995. Sampras never lost a final, and he took seven titles between 1993 and 2000. Federer has appeared in a record twelve finals overall, winning a record eight; he also reached a record seven consecutive finals from 2003 through 2009 . Nadal has appeared in five finals from 2006 through 2011, failing to reach the 2009 final. Of the five finals, he won two. Since 2011, Djokovic has made ten finals appearances, winning seven.

The women who have reached the final at least five times during the open era are Billie Jean King, Evonne Goolagong Cawley, Chris Evert, Martina Navratilova, Steffi Graf, Venus Williams, and Serena Williams. King appeared in all finals from 1968 through 1975, except in 1971 and 1974. She won once in her first three finals (1968), before she took the victory in her last three finals. Goolagong Cawley reached five finals between 1971 and 1980 but won only her first and last finals. Evert reached ten finals out of 13 years between 1973 and 1985 but won only three titles. Navratilova won nine of her 12 finals between 1978 and 1994. Graf reached nine finals between 1987 and 1999, which she won seven times. Since 2000, Venus Williams has won the final five times in nine attempts. Her sister Serena Williams has appeared in eleven finals since 2002, in which she won seven titles.

== Gentlemen ==
During the 55 times that this tournament has been held in the open era, 43 men have reached the Wimbledon gentlemen's singles final with 22 champions. The final has included men from 19 different nationalities. The most represented nations are the United States and Australia with Sweden, Switzerland, Czechoslovakia, Germany, and Serbia represented to a lesser extent.

- * = Champion

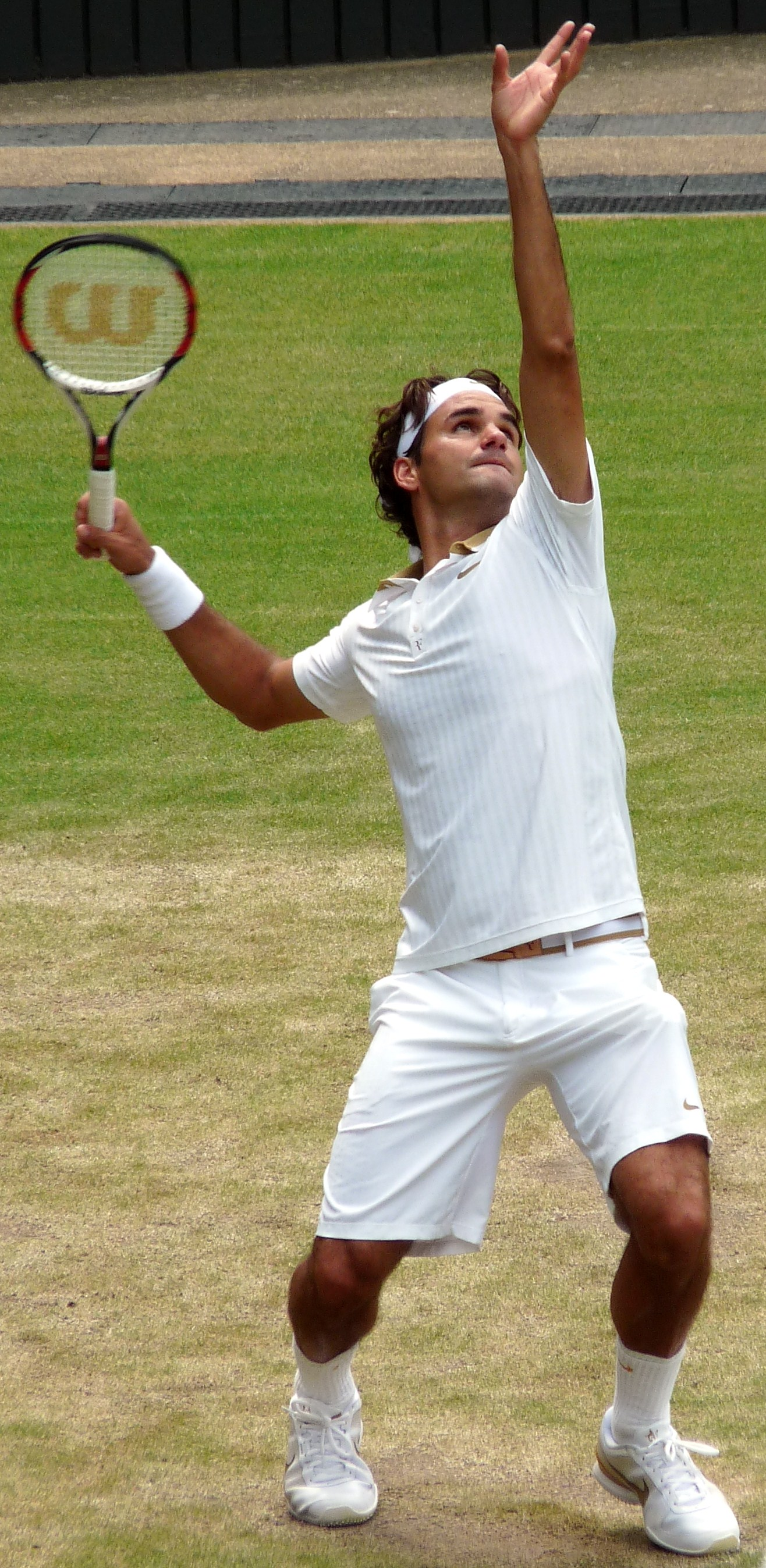
Roger Federer, a record twelve-time finalist (eight wins).

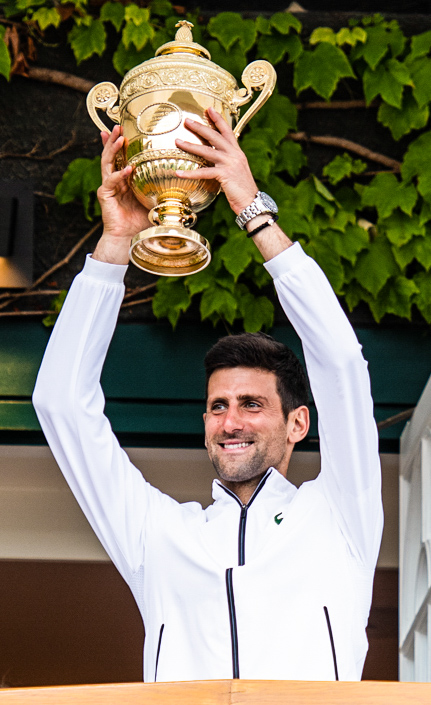
Novak Djokovic, a ten-time finalist (seven wins).

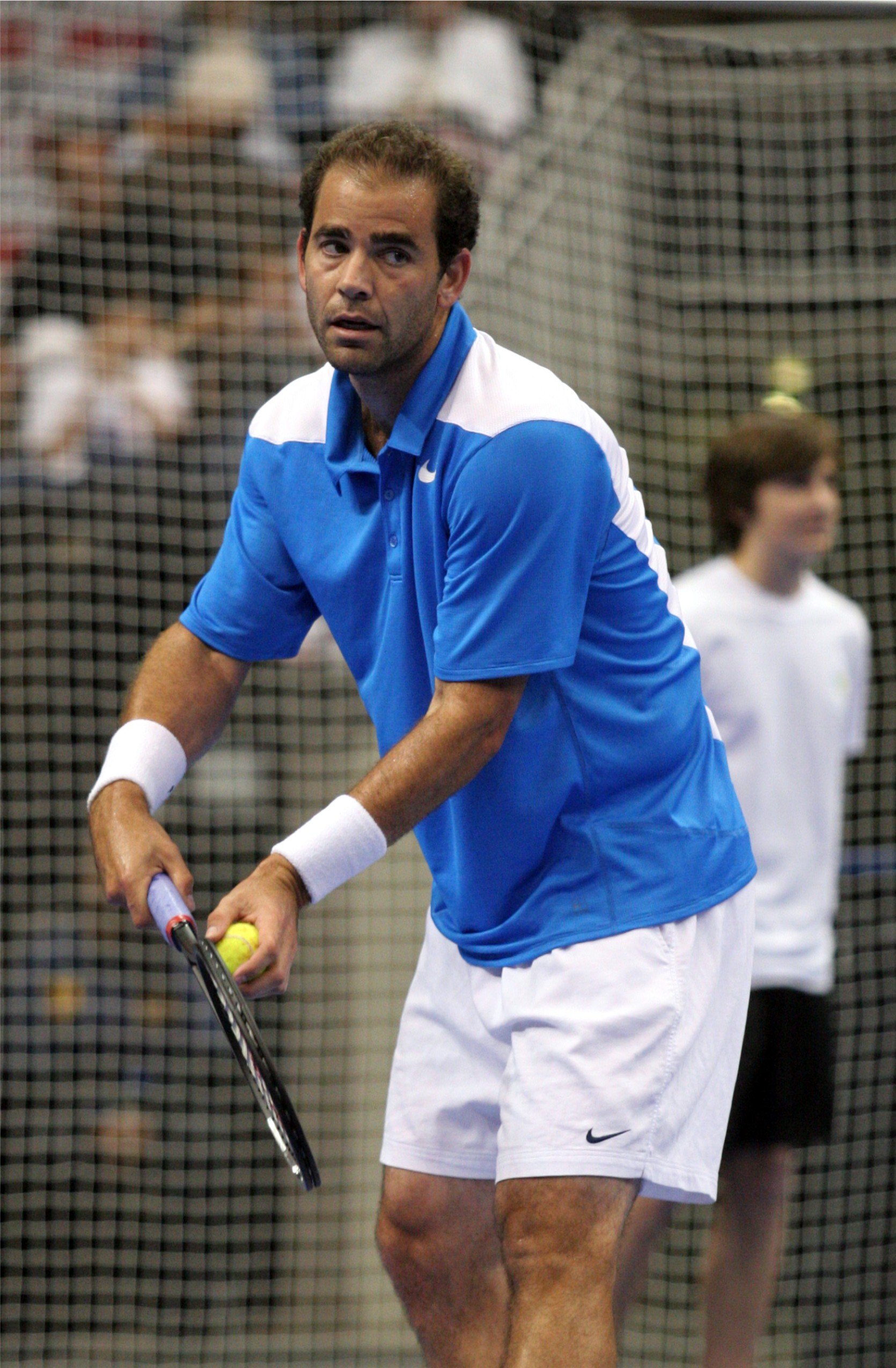
Pete Sampras, a seven-time finalist (seven wins).

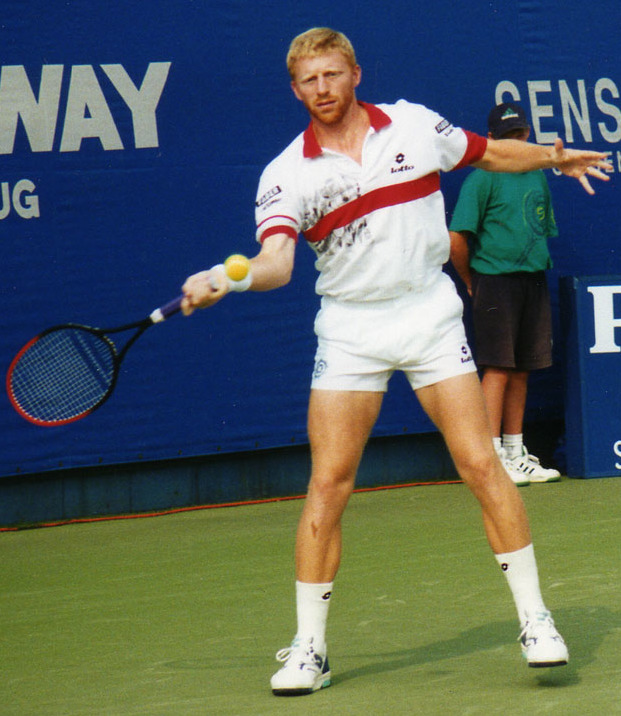
Boris Becker, a seven-time finalist (three wins).

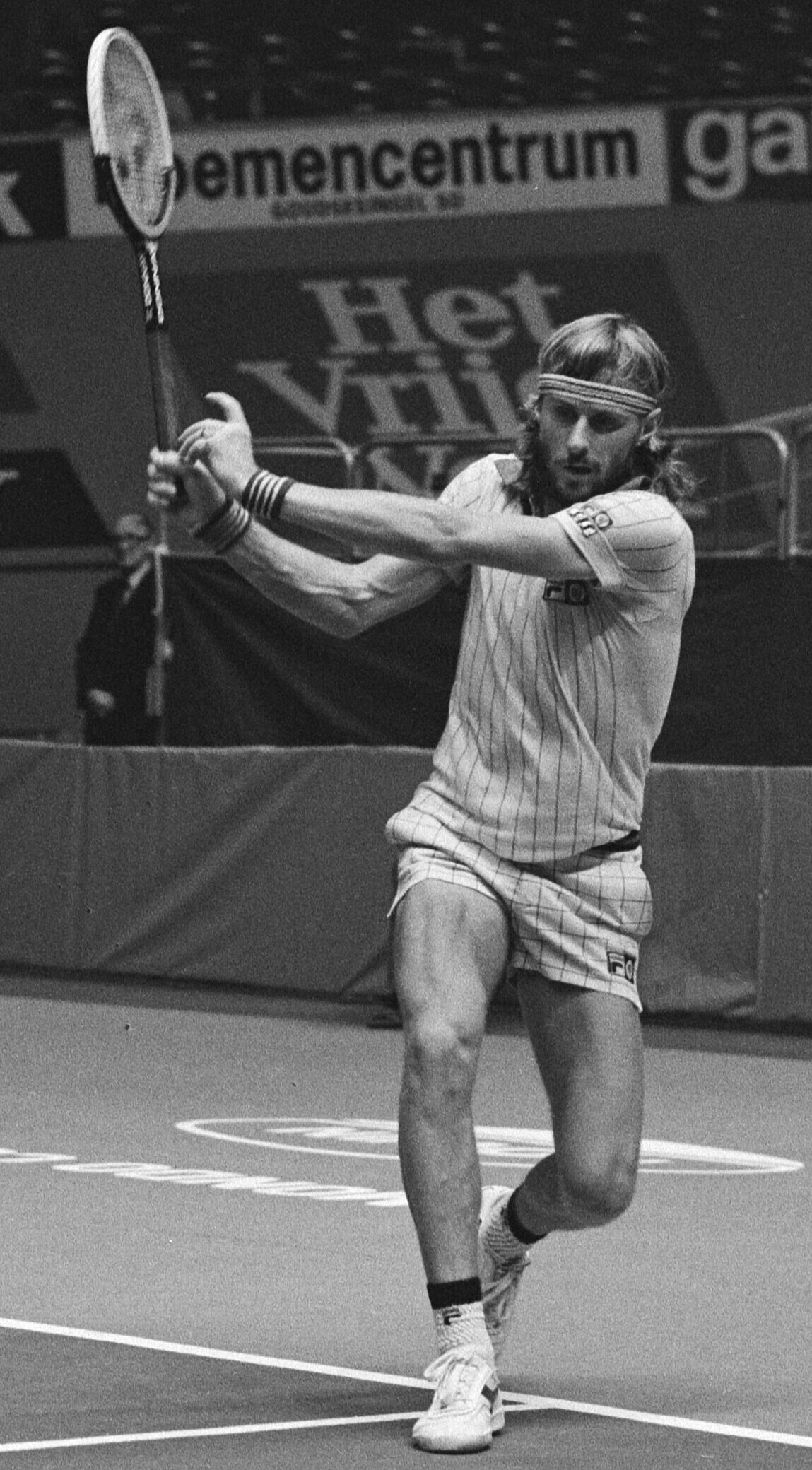
Björn Borg, a six-time finalist (five wins).

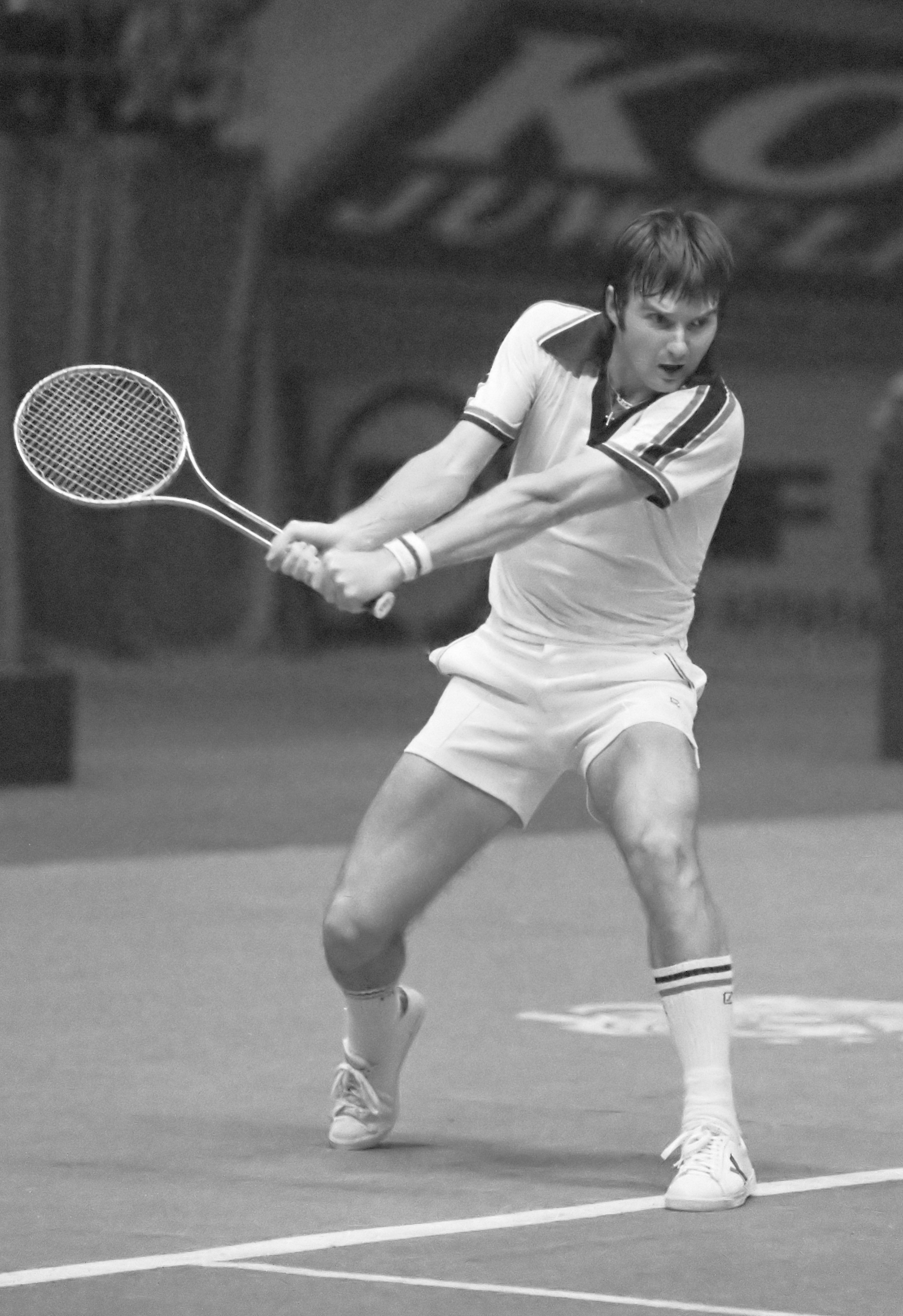
Jimmy Connors, a six-time finalist (two wins).

Player	Nationality	Finals	Win-Loss	Year(s)
Roger Federer	Switzerland	12	8–4	2003*, 2004*, 2005*, 2006*, 2007*, 2008, 2009*, 2012*, 2014, 2015, 2017*, 2019
Novak Djokovic	Serbia	10	7–3	2011*, 2013, 2014*, 2015*, 2018*, 2019*, 2021*, 2022*, 2023, 2024
Pete Sampras	United States	7	7–0	1993*, 1994*, 1995*, 1997*, 1998*, 1999*, 2000*
Boris Becker	Germany	7	3–4	1985*, 1986*, 1988, 1989*, 1990, 1991, 1995
Björn Borg	Sweden	6	5–1	1976*, 1977*, 1978*, 1979*, 1980*, 1981
Jimmy Connors	United States	6	2–4	1974*, 1975, 1977, 1978, 1982*, 1984
John McEnroe	United States	5	3–2	1980, 1981*, 1982, 1983*, 1984*
Rafael Nadal	Spain	5	2–3	2006, 2007, 2008*, 2010*, 2011
Goran Ivanišević	Croatia	4	1–3	1992, 1994, 1998, 2001*
John Newcombe	Australia	3	2–1	1969, 1970*, 1971*
Stefan Edberg	Sweden	3	2–1	1988*, 1989, 1990*
Andy Murray	United Kingdom	3	2–1	2012, 2013*, 2016*
Carlos Alcaraz	Spain	3	2–1	2023*, 2024*, 2025
Andy Roddick	United States	3	0–3	2004, 2005, 2009
Rod Laver	Australia	2	2–0	1968*, 1969*
Jannik Sinner	Italy	2	2–0	2025*, 2026*
Stan Smith	United States	2	1–1	1971, 1972*
Andre Agassi	United States	2	1–1	1992*, 1999
Ken Rosewall	Australia	2	0–2	1970, 1974
Ilie Năstase	Romania	2	0–2	1972, 1976
Ivan Lendl	Czechoslovakia	2	0–2	1986, 1987
Patrick Rafter	Australia	2	0–2	2000, 2001
Jan Kodeš	Czechoslovakia	1	1–0	1973*
Arthur Ashe	United States	1	1–0	1975*
Pat Cash	Australia	1	1–0	1987*
Michael Stich	Germany	1	1–0	1991*
Richard Krajicek	Netherlands	1	1–0	1996*
Lleyton Hewitt	Australia	1	1–0	2002*
Tony Roche	Australia	1	0–1	1968
Alex Metreveli	Soviet Union	1	0–1	1973
Roscoe Tanner	United States	1	0–1	1979
Chris Lewis	New Zealand	1	0–1	1983
Kevin Curren	United States	1	0–1	1985
Jim Courier	United States	1	0–1	1993
MaliVai Washington	United States	1	0–1	1996
Cédric Pioline	France	1	0–1	1997
David Nalbandian	Argentina	1	0–1	2002
Mark Philippoussis	Australia	1	0–1	2003
Tomáš Berdych	Czech Republic	1	0–1	2010
Milos Raonic	Canada	1	0–1	2016
Marin Čilić	Croatia	1	0–1	2017
Kevin Anderson	South Africa	1	0–1	2018
Matteo Berrettini	Italy	1	0–1	2021
Nick Kyrgios	Australia	1	0–1	2022

=== Most recent final ===
Year	Nationality	Winner	Nationality	Runner-up
2026	Italy	Jannik Sinner	Germany	Alexander Zverev

=== Multiple-time opponents in the Open Era ===
Opponents		Record	Finals meetings
(Sweden) Björn Borg	(United States) Jimmy Connors	2–0	1977, 1978
(Sweden) Björn Borg	(United States) John McEnroe	1–1	1980 (Borg), 1981 (McEnroe)
(United States) Jimmy Connors	(United States) John McEnroe	1–1	1982 (Connors), 1984 (McEnroe)
(Sweden) Stefan Edberg	(West Germany) Boris Becker	2–1	1988 (Edberg), 1989 (Becker), 1990 (Edberg)
(United States) Pete Sampras	(Croatia) Goran Ivanišević	2–0	1994, 1998
(Switzerland) Roger Federer	(United States) Andy Roddick	3–0	2004, 2005, 2009
(Switzerland) Roger Federer	(Spain) Rafael Nadal	2–1	2006 (Federer), 2007 (Federer), 2008 (Nadal)
(Serbia) Novak Djokovic	(Switzerland) Roger Federer	3–0	2014, 2015, 2019
(Spain) Carlos Alcaraz	(Serbia) Novak Djokovic	2–0	2023, 2024

=== Most consecutive finals in the Open Era ===
Country	Player	Number	Years	Results	
Country	Player	Number	Years	Won	Lost
Switzerland	Roger Federer	7	2003–09	6	1
Sweden	Björn Borg	6	1976–81	5	1
Serbia	Novak Djokovic	6	2018–24	4	2
United States	John McEnroe	5	1980–84	3	2
Germany	Boris Becker	4	1988–91	1	3
United States	Pete Sampras	4	1997–2000	4	0
Australia	John Newcombe	3	1969–71	2	1
Sweden	Stefan Edberg	3	1988–90	2	1
United States	Pete Sampras	3	1993–95	3	0
Spain	Rafael Nadal	3	2006–08	1	2
Serbia	Novak Djokovic	3	2013–15	2	1
Spain	Carlos Alcaraz	3	2023–25	2	1
Australia	Rod Laver	2	1968–69	2	0
United States	Stan Smith	2	1971–72	1	1
United States	Jimmy Connors	2	1974–75	1	1
United States	Jimmy Connors	2	1977–78	0	2
Germany	Boris Becker	2	1985–86	2	0
Czechoslovakia	Ivan Lendl	2	1986–87	0	2
Australia	Patrick Rafter	2	2000–01	0	2
United States	Andy Roddick	2	2004–05	0	2
Spain	Rafael Nadal	2	2010–11	1	1
United Kingdom	Andy Murray	2	2012–13	1	1
Switzerland	Roger Federer	2	2014–15	0	2

Bolded Years^ indicates Active or Current Streak

== Ladies ==
During the 54 times that this tournament has been held in the open era, 39 women have reached the Wimbledon ladies' singles final. The final has included women from 17 different nationalities. The United States is the most represented by a large margin, with Australia, Czechoslovakia/Czech Republic, Spain, and France represented to a lesser extent.

- * = Champion

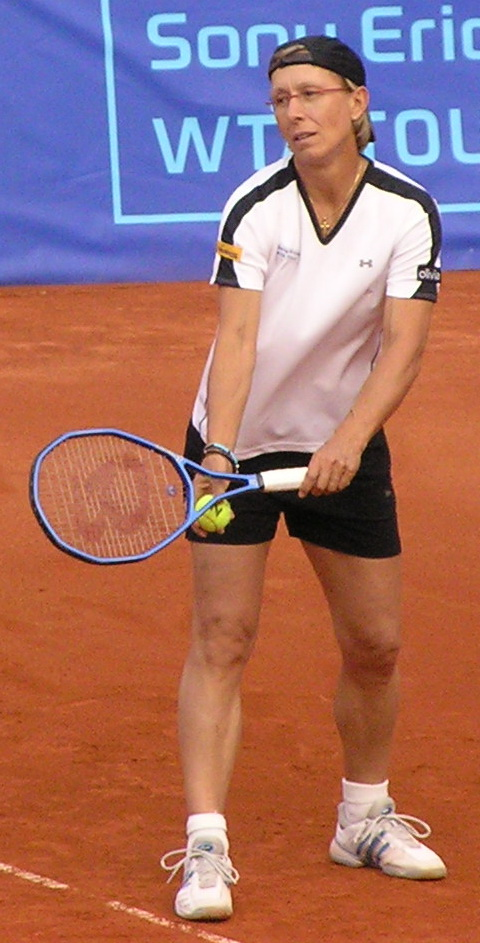
Martina Navratilova, a twelve-time finalist (nine wins).

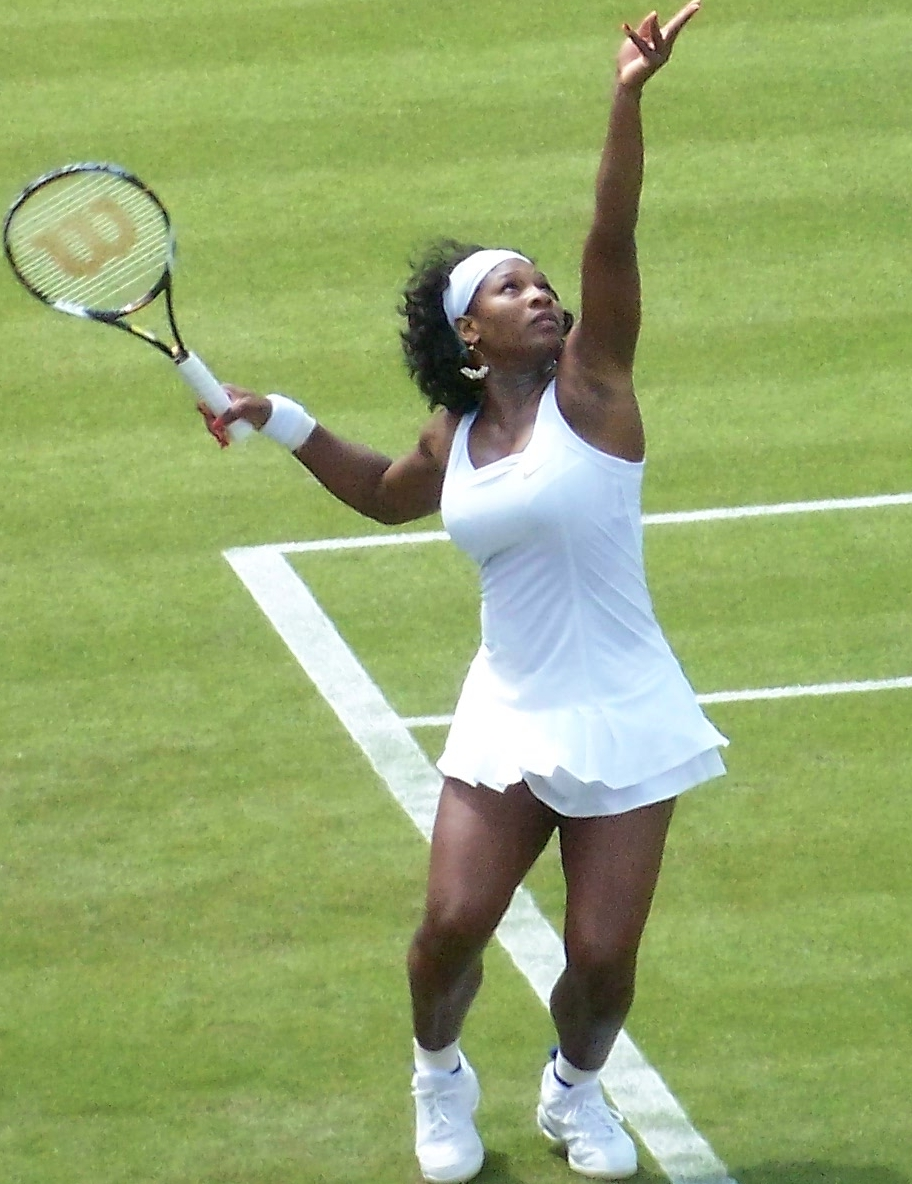
Serena Williams, an eleven-time finalist (seven wins).

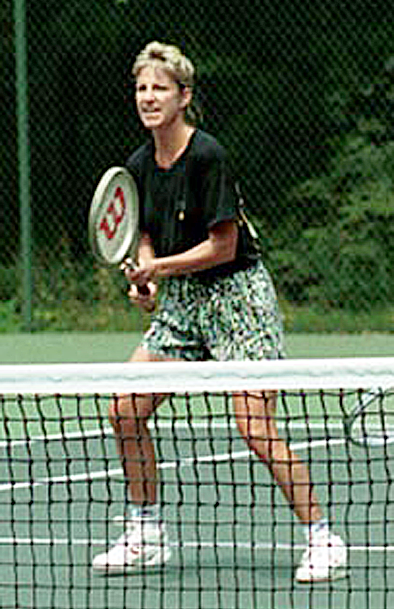
Chris Evert, a ten-time finalist (three wins).

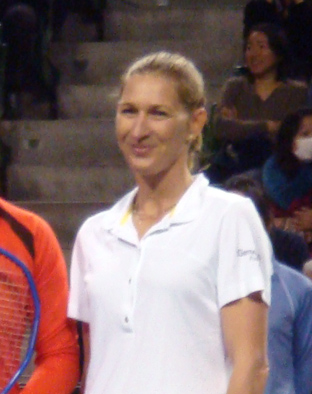
Steffi Graf, a nine-time finalist (seven wins).

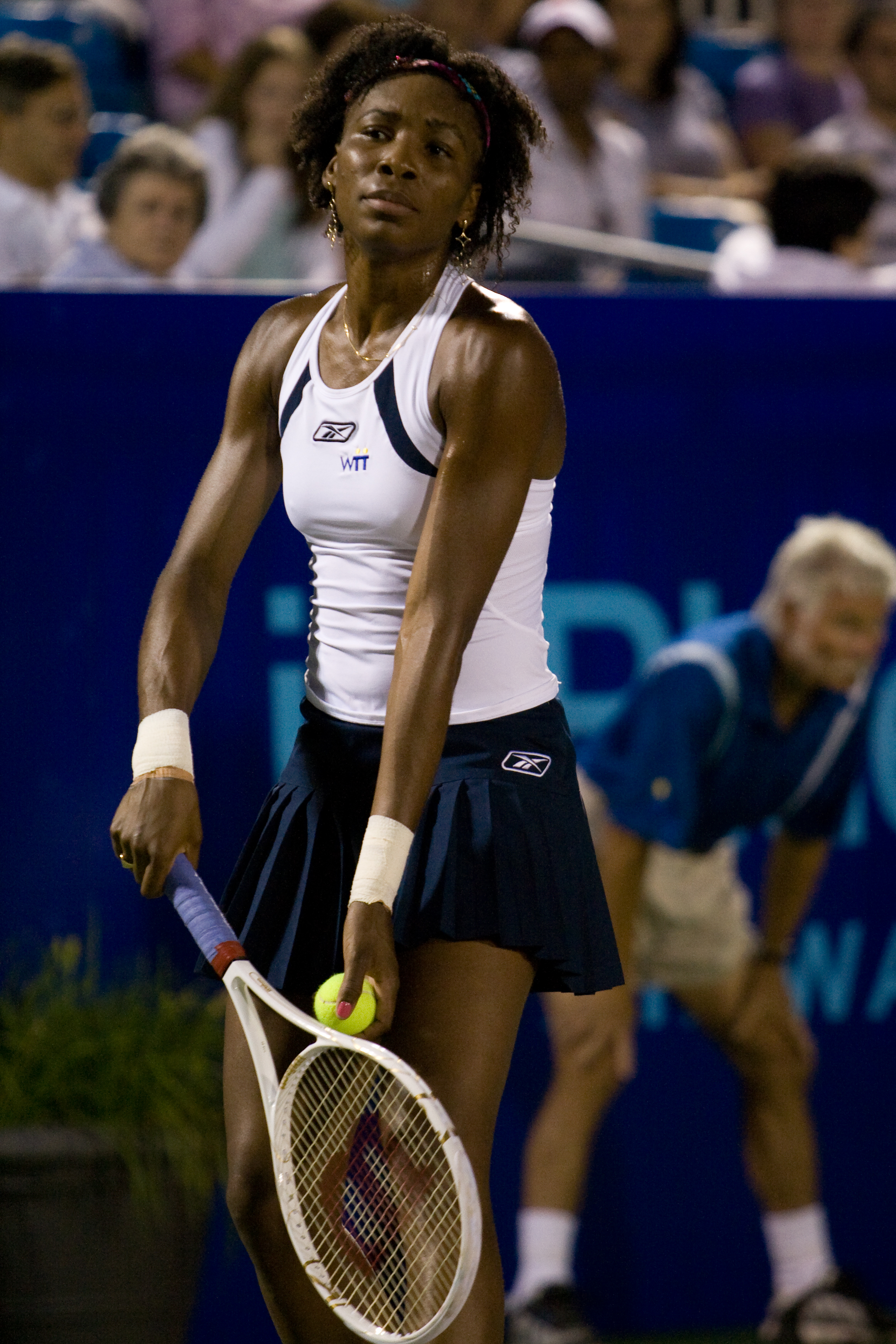
Venus Williams, a nine-time finalist (five wins).

Player	Nationality	Finals	Win-Loss	Year(s)
Martina Navratilova	United States^{[B]}	12	9–3	1978*, 1979*, 1982*, 1983*, 1984*, 1985*, 1986*, 1987*, 1988, 1989, 1990*, 1994
Serena Williams	United States	11	7–4	2002*, 2003*, 2004, 2008, 2009*, 2010*, 2012*, 2015*, 2016*, 2018, 2019
Chris Evert	United States	10	3–7	1973, 1974*, 1976*, 1978, 1979, 1980, 1981*, 1982, 1984, 1985
Steffi Graf	Germany	9	7–2	1987, 1988*, 1989*, 1991*, 1992*, 1993*, 1995*, 1996*, 1999
Venus Williams	United States	9	5–4	2000*, 2001*, 2002, 2003, 2005*, 2007*, 2008*, 2009, 2017
Billie Jean King	United States	6	4–2	1968*, 1969, 1970, 1972*, 1973*, 1975*
Evonne Goolagong Cawley	Australia	5	2–3	1971*, 1972, 1975, 1976, 1980*
Jana Novotná	Czech Republic	3	1–2	1993, 1997, 1998*
Lindsay Davenport	United States	3	1–2	1999*, 2000, 2005
Petra Kvitová	Czech Republic	2	2–0	2011*, 2014*
Margaret Court	Australia	2	1–1	1970*, 1971
Maria Sharapova	Russia	2	1–1	2004*, 2011
Marion Bartoli	France	2	1–1	2007, 2013*
Garbiñe Muguruza	Spain	2	1–1	2015, 2017*
Angelique Kerber	Germany	2	1–1	2016, 2018*
Hana Mandlíková	Czechoslovakia	2	0–2	1981, 1986
Arantxa Sánchez Vicario	Spain	2	0–2	1995, 1996
Justine Henin	Belgium	2	0–2	2001, 2006
Ons Jabeur	Tunisia	2	0–2	2022, 2023
Ann Haydon-Jones	United Kingdom	1	1–0	1969*
Virginia Wade	United Kingdom	1	1–0	1977*
Conchita Martínez	Spain	1	1–0	1994*
Martina Hingis	Switzerland	1	1–0	1997*
Amélie Mauresmo	France	1	1–0	2006*
Simona Halep	Romania	1	1–0	2019*
Ashleigh Barty	Australia	1	1–0	2021*
Elena Rybakina	Kazakhstan	1	1–0	2022*
Markéta Vondroušová	Czech Republic	1	1–0	2023*
Iga Świątek	Poland	1	1–0	2025*
Judy Tegart Dalton	Australia	1	0–1	1968
Olga Morozova	Soviet Union	1	0–1	1974
Betty Stöve	Netherlands	1	0–1	1977
Andrea Jaeger	United States	1	0–1	1983
Zina Garrison	United States	1	0–1	1990
Gabriela Sabatini	Argentina	1	0–1	1991
Monica Seles	Serbia and Montenegro^{[C]}	1	0–1	1992
Nathalie Tauziat	France	1	0–1	1998
Vera Zvonareva	Russia	1	0–1	2010
Agnieszka Radwańska	Poland	1	0–1	2012
Sabine Lisicki	Germany	1	0–1	2013
Eugenie Bouchard	Canada	1	0–1	2014
Karolína Plíšková	Czech Republic	1	0–1	2021
Amanda Anisimova	United States	1	0–1	2025

=== Most recent final ===
Year	Nationality	Winner	Nationality	Runner-up
2026	Czech Republic	Linda Nosková	Czech Republic	Karolína Muchová

=== Multiple-time opponents in the Open Era ===
Opponents		Record	Finals meetings
(United States) Billie Jean King	(Australia) Evonne Goolagong Cawley	2–0	1972, 1975
(Australia) Evonne Goolagong Cawley	(United States) Chris Evert	1–1	1976 (Evert), 1980 (Cawley)
(United States) Martina Navratilova	(United States) Chris Evert	5–0	1978, 1979, 1982, 1984, 1985
(West Germany) Steffi Graf	(United States) Martina Navratilova	2–1	1987 (Navratilova), 1988 (Graf), 1989 (Graf)
(Germany) Steffi Graf	(Spain) Arantxa Sánchez Vicario	2–0	1995, 1996
(United States) Venus Williams	(United States) Lindsay Davenport	2–0	2000, 2005
(United States) Serena Williams	(United States) Venus Williams	3–1	2002 (Serena), 2003 (Serena), 2008 (Venus), 2009 (Serena)
(United States) Serena Williams	(Germany) Angelique Kerber	1–1	2016 (Williams), 2018 (Kerber)

=== Most consecutive finals in the Open Era ===
Country	Player	Number	Years	Results	
Country	Player	Number	Years	Won	Lost
United States	Martina Navratilova	9	1982–90	7	2
United States	Chris Evert	5	1978–82	1	4
United States	Venus Williams	4	2000–03	2	2
United States	Billie Jean King	3	1968–70	1	2
Germany	Steffi Graf	3	1987–89	2	1
Germany	Steffi Graf	3	1991–93	3	0
United States	Serena Williams	3	2002–04	2	1
United States	Venus Williams	3	2007–09	2	1
United States	Serena Williams	3	2008–10	2	1
Australia	Margaret Court	2	1970–71	1	1
Australia	Evonne Goolagong Cawley	2	1971–72	1	1
United States	Billie Jean King	2	1972–73	2	0
United States	Chris Evert	2	1973–74	1	1
Australia	Evonne Goolagong Cawley	2	1975–76	0	2
United States	Martina Navratilova	2	1978–79	2	0
United States	Chris Evert	2	1984–85	0	2
Germany	Steffi Graf	2	1995–96	2	0
Spain	Arantxa Sánchez Vicario	2	1995–96	0	2
Czech Republic	Jana Novotná	2	1997–98	1	1
United States	Lindsay Davenport	2	1999–2000	1	1
United States	Serena Williams	2	2015–16	2	0
United States	Serena Williams	2	2018–19	0	2
Tunisia	Ons Jabeur	2	2022–23	0	2

Bolded Years^ indicates Active or Current Streak

== See also ==
- List of Australian Open singles finalists during the Open Era
- List of French Open singles finalists during the Open Era
- List of US Open singles finalists during the Open Era

== Notes ==
- ^{B} Martina Navratilova was born in Czechoslovakia but lost her citizenship in 1975. She became a United States citizen in 1981. Her Czech citizenship was restored in 2008.
- ^{C} Monica Seles was born in Yugoslavia but became a United States citizen in 1994.
