= List of US Open singles finalists during the Open Era =

US Open singles finalists
- Location: Queens – New York City; United States
- Created: 1968 (58 finals, including 2025)
- Men's most: 10: Novak Djokovic
- Men's most consecutive: 8: Ivan Lendl
- Women's most: 10: Serena Williams
- Women's most consecutive: 6: Chris Evert
- Most meetings: Men's (3 times): Sampras vs. Agassi (3–0); Nadal vs. Djokovic (2–1); Women's (2 times): Evert vs. Goolagong Cawley (2–0); Evert vs. Mandlíková (2–0); Navratilova vs. Evert (2–0); Graf vs. Navratilova (1–1); Graf vs. Seles (2–0); Serena vs. Venus (1–1); Serena vs. Azarenka (2–0)
- Official website

The US Open is a Grand Slam tennis tournament held in New York City at the USTA Billie Jean King National Tennis Center in the area of Flushing Meadows. In 1968, this tournament became open to professionals and has been known since then as the US Open. The person who has reached the finals for singles the most in tournament history is Serena Williams. Since 1999, Serena Williams has reached the final ten times and won six titles. The two players who have won the most singles titles, with six titles each, are Serena Williams and Chris Evert.

The women who have reached the final at least four times during the Open Era are Billie Jean King, Evonne Goolagong Cawley, Chris Evert, Martina Navratilova, Steffi Graf, Monica Seles, Venus Williams, Serena Williams and Kim Clijsters. In the seven years from 1968 through 1974, King appeared in four finals and won three titles. Goolagong Cawley was the runner-up four consecutive years from 1973 through 1976. In the ten years from 1975 through 1984, Evert reached nine finals and won six titles. She reached six consecutive finals, and won five titles, between 1975 and 1980. She reached three consecutive finals, and won one title, between 1982 and 1984. Navratilova from 1981 through 1991 appeared in eight finals, and won four titles. Graf twice appeared in four consecutive finals, the first in 1987-1990 when she won two titles and the second in 1993-1996 when she won three titles. Seles reached four finals from 1991 through 1996, winning two consecutive titles in 1991 and 1992 but losing two consecutive finals in 1995 and 1996. From 1997 through 2002, Venus Williams appeared in four finals and won two consecutive titles in 2000 and 2001. Since 1999, Serena Williams has reached the final ten times and won six titles in 1999, 2002, 2008, 2012, 2013 and 2014. During 2003 to 2010, Clijsters made the finals four times, winning in 2005, 2009, and 2010.

The men who have reached the final at least four times during the Open Era are Jimmy Connors, Björn Borg, John McEnroe, Ivan Lendl, Pete Sampras, Andre Agassi, Roger Federer, Rafael Nadal and Novak Djokovic. Connors reached five consecutive finals, and won three titles, from 1974 through 1978 before he won consecutive titles in 1982 and 1983. Borg reached four finals in six years from 1976 through 1981 but lost all of them. McEnroe won three straight titles from 1979 through 1981 before he won another title in 1984 and was the runner-up in 1985. Lendl reached eight consecutive finals, and won three titles, from 1982 through 1989. From 1990 through 2002, Sampras reached the final eight times and won five titles. In the 16 years from 1990 through 2005, Agassi reached six finals but won only two titles. Federer has reached six consecutive finals and seven overall. He won the first five finals before losing the last two. Nadal reached the final three times in four years, beginning in 2010; winning twice in 2010 and 2013 while losing in 2011; and then won two more finals in 2017 and 2019. Djokovic reached the final ten times and he won in four of those appearances.

== Men ==
During the 58 times that this tournament has been held in the Open Era, 45 men have reached the US Open men's singles final. The final has included men from 16 different nationalities, with most being from the United States although Sweden, Czechoslovakia/Czech Republic, Australia, Switzerland, Spain, and Serbia also have made significant contributions.

- * = Champion

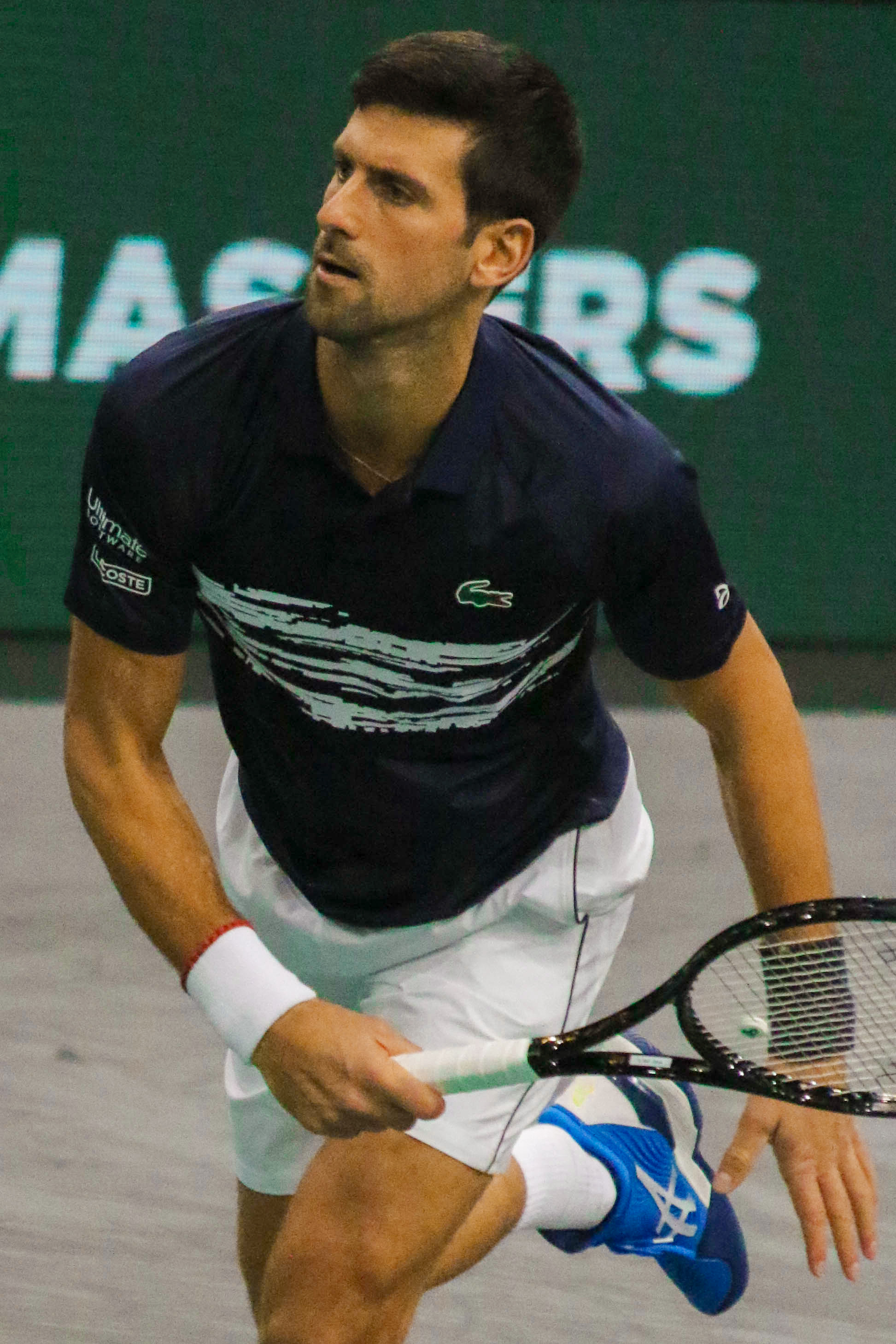
Novak Djokovic, a ten-time finalist (four wins).

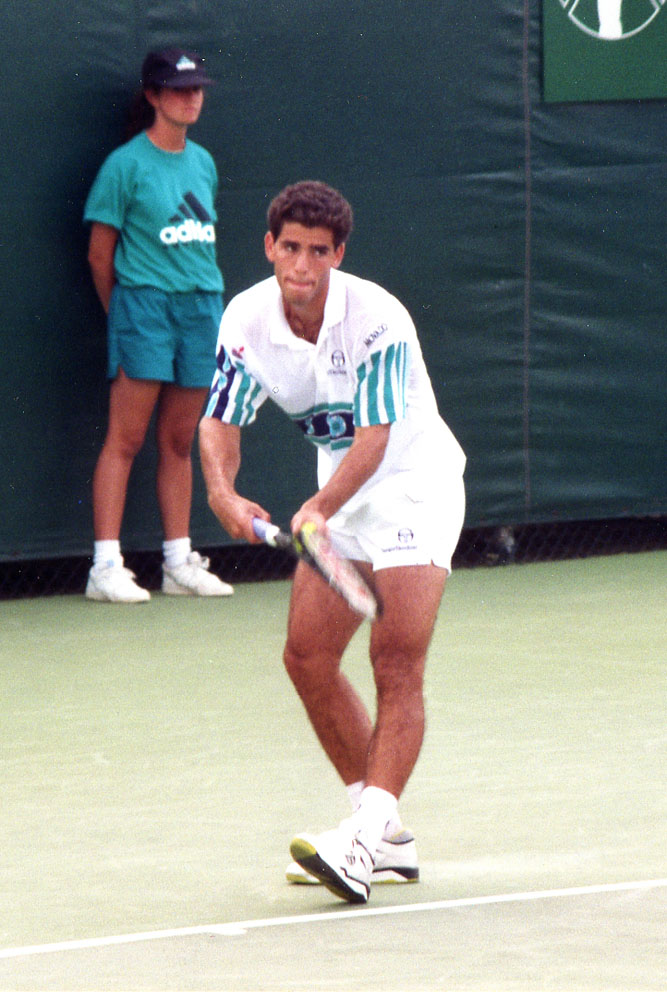
Pete Sampras, an eight-time finalist (five wins).

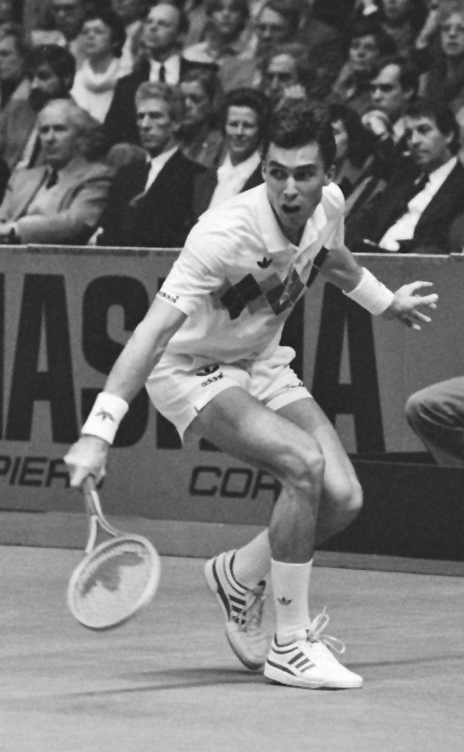
Ivan Lendl, an eight-time finalist (three wins).

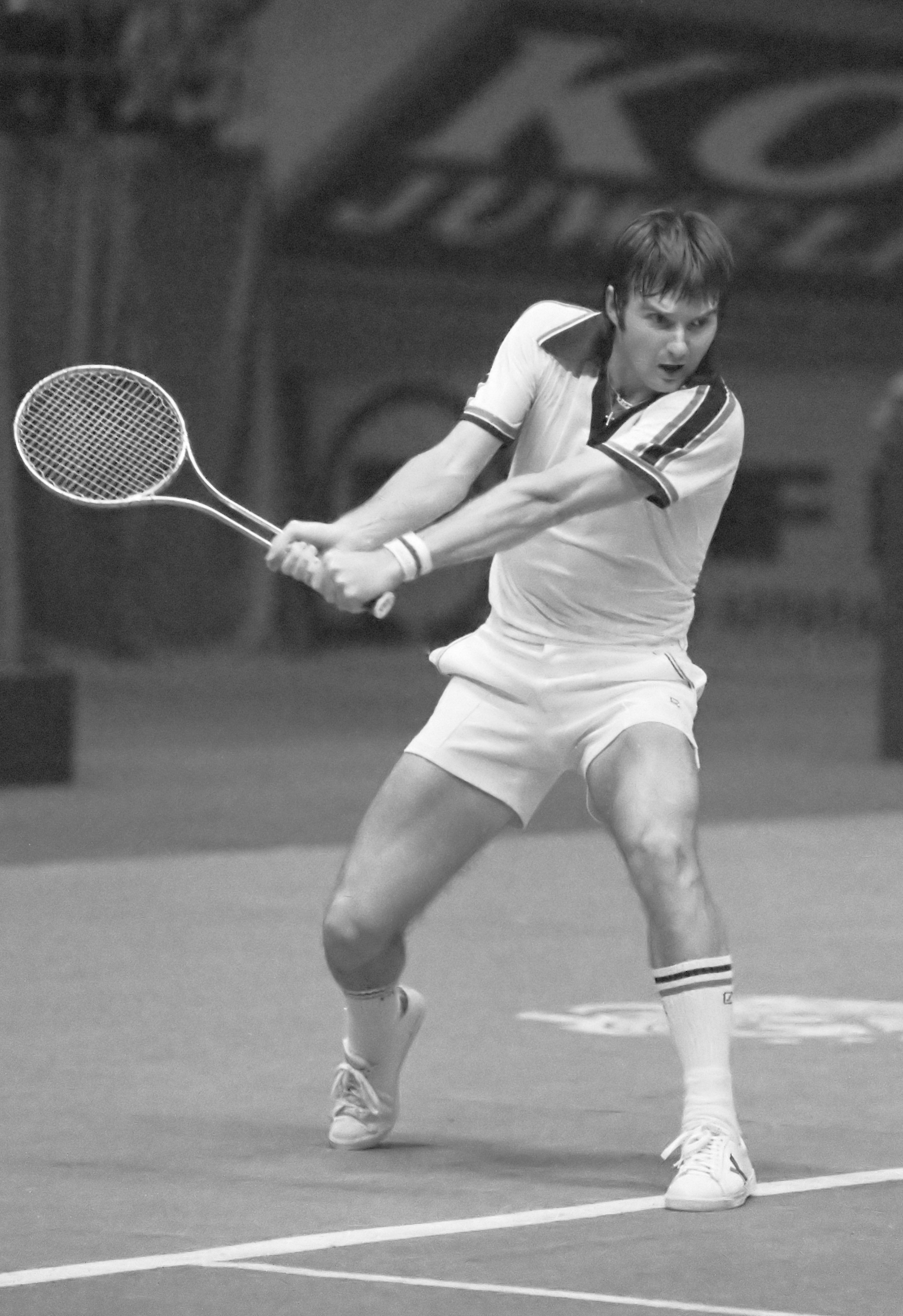
Jimmy Connors, a seven-time finalist (five wins).

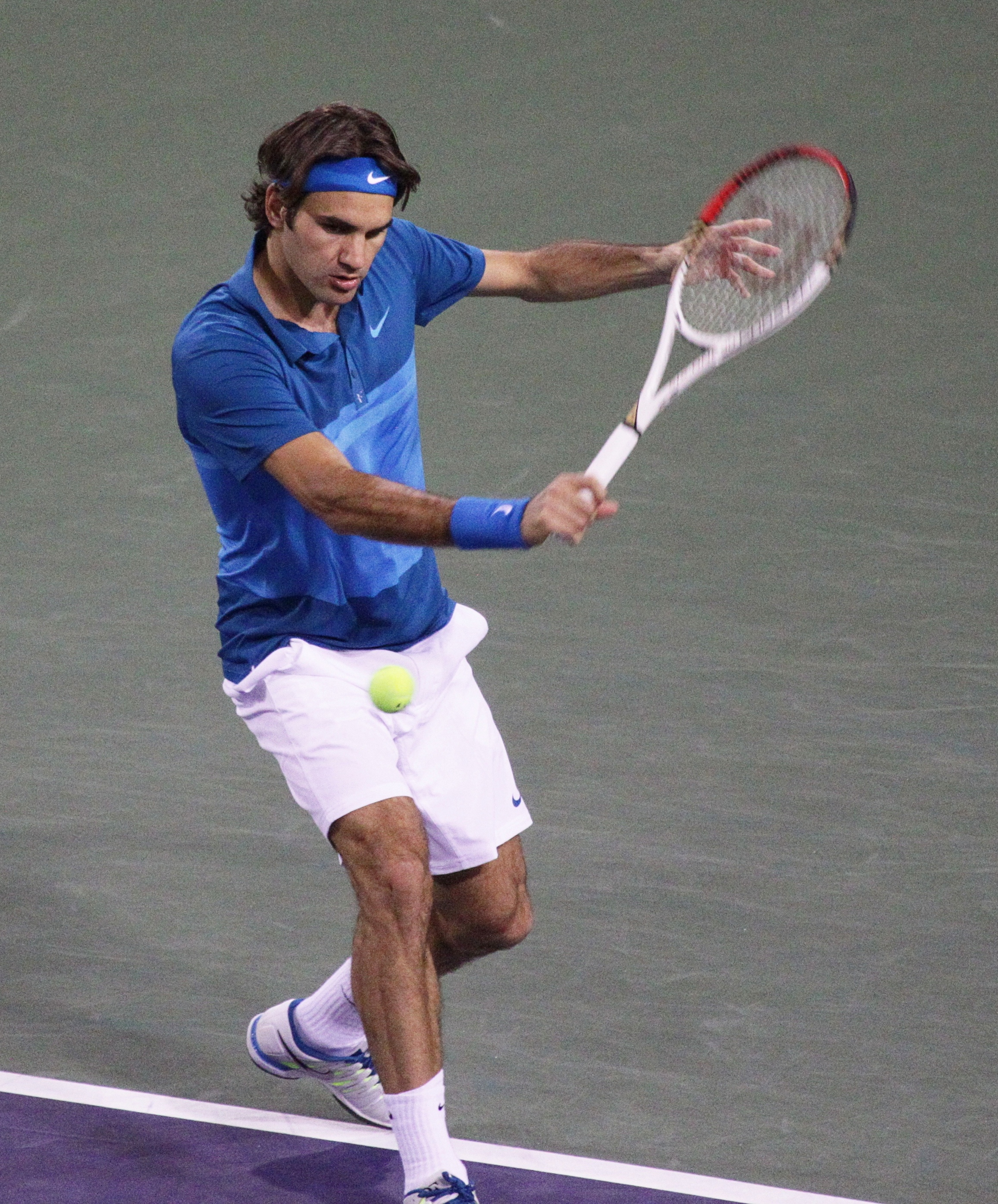
Roger Federer, a seven-time finalist (five wins).

| Country | Player | Finals | Win-Loss | Year(s) |
|---|---|---|---|---|
| SRB | Novak Djokovic | 10 | 4–6 | 2007, 2010, 2011*, 2012, 2013, 2015*, 2016, 2018*, 2021, 2023* |
| USA | Pete Sampras | 8 | 5–3 | 1990*, 1992, 1993*, 1995*, 1996*, 2000, 2001, 2002* |
| CZS | Ivan Lendl | 8 | 3–5 | 1982, 1983, 1984, 1985*, 1986*, 1987*, 1988, 1989 |
| USA | Jimmy Connors | 7 | 5–2 | 1974*, 1975, 1976*, 1977, 1978*, 1982*, 1983* |
| SUI | Roger Federer | 7 | 5–2 | 2004*, 2005*, 2006*, 2007*, 2008*, 2009, 2015 |
| USA | Andre Agassi | 6 | 2–4 | 1990, 1994*, 1995, 1999*, 2002, 2005 |
| USA | John McEnroe | 5 | 4–1 | 1979*, 1980*, 1981*, 1984*, 1985 |
| ESP | Rafael Nadal | 5 | 4–1 | 2010*, 2011, 2013*, 2017*, 2019* |
| SWE | Björn Borg | 4 | 0–4 | 1976, 1978, 1980, 1981 |
| RUS | Daniil Medvedev | 3 | 1–2 | 2019, 2021*, 2023 |
| SWE | Stefan Edberg | 2 | 2–0 | 1991*, 1992* |
| AUS | Patrick Rafter | 2 | 2–0 | 1997*, 1998* |
| USA | Arthur Ashe | 2 | 1–1 | 1968*, 1972 |
| AUS | Ken Rosewall | 2 | 1–1 | 1970*, 1974 |
| SWE | Mats Wilander | 2 | 1–1 | 1987, 1988* |
| AUS | Lleyton Hewitt | 2 | 1–1 | 2001*, 2004 |
| USA | Andy Roddick | 2 | 1–1 | 2003*, 2006 |
| UK | Andy Murray | 2 | 1–1 | 2008, 2012* |
| ARG | Juan Martín del Potro | 2 | 1–1 | 2009*, 2018 |
| AUS | Tony Roche | 2 | 0–2 | 1969, 1970 |
| ESP | Carlos Alcaraz | 2 | 2–0 | 2022*, 2025* |
| ITA | Jannik Sinner | 2 | 1–1 | 2024*, 2025 |
| CZS | Jan Kodeš | 2 | 0–2 | 1971, 1973 |
| AUS | Rod Laver | 1 | 1–0 | 1969* |
| USA | Stan Smith | 1 | 1–0 | 1971* |
| ROU | Ilie Năstase | 1 | 1–0 | 1972* |
| AUS | John Newcombe | 1 | 1–0 | 1973* |
| ESP | Manuel Orantes | 1 | 1–0 | 1975* |
| ARG | Guillermo Vilas | 1 | 1–0 | 1977* |
| FRG | Boris Becker | 1 | 1–0 | 1989* |
| RUS | Marat Safin | 1 | 1–0 | 2000* |
| CRO | Marin Čilić | 1 | 1–0 | 2014* |
| SUI | Stan Wawrinka | 1 | 1–0 | 2016* |
| AUT | Dominic Thiem | 1 | 1–0 | 2020* |
| NED | Tom Okker | 1 | 0–1 | 1968 |
| USA | Vitas Gerulaitis | 1 | 0–1 | 1979 |
| CZS | Miloslav Mečíř | 1 | 0–1 | 1986 |
| USA | Jim Courier | 1 | 0–1 | 1991 |
| FRA | Cédric Pioline | 1 | 0–1 | 1993 |
| GER | Michael Stich | 1 | 0–1 | 1994 |
| USA | Michael Chang | 1 | 0–1 | 1996 |
| UK | Greg Rusedski | 1 | 0–1 | 1997 |
| AUS | Mark Philippoussis | 1 | 0–1 | 1998 |
| USA | Todd Martin | 1 | 0–1 | 1999 |
| ESP | Juan Carlos Ferrero | 1 | 0–1 | 2003 |
| JPN | Kei Nishikori | 1 | 0–1 | 2014 |
| RSA | Kevin Anderson | 1 | 0–1 | 2017 |
| GER | Alexander Zverev | 1 | 0–1 | 2020 |
| NOR | Casper Ruud | 1 | 0–1 | 2022 |
| USA | Taylor Fritz | 1 | 0–1 | 2024 |

=== Most recent final ===
| Year | Country | Champion | Country | Runner-up |
|---|---|---|---|---|
| 2025 | ESP | Carlos Alcaraz | ITA | Jannik Sinner |

=== Multiple-time opponents in the Open Era ===
| Opponents | | Record | Finals meetings |
|---|---|---|---|
| (United States) **Jimmy Connors** | (Sweden) Björn Borg | 2–0 | 1976, 1978 |
| (United States) **John McEnroe** | (Sweden) Björn Borg | 2–0 | 1980, 1981 |
| (United States) **Jimmy Connors** | (Czechoslovakia) Ivan Lendl | 2–0 | 1982, 1983 |
| (Czechoslovakia) Ivan Lendl | (United States) John McEnroe | 1–1 | 1984 (McEnroe), 1985 (Lendl) |
| (Czechoslovakia) Ivan Lendl | (Sweden) Mats Wilander | 1–1 | 1987 (Lendl), 1988 (Wilander) |
| (United States) **Pete Sampras** | (United States) Andre Agassi | 3–0 | 1990, 1995, 2002 |
| (Serbia) Novak Djokovic | (Switzerland) Roger Federer | 1–1 | 2007 (Federer), 2015 (Djokovic) |
| (Spain) **Rafael Nadal** | (Serbia) Novak Djokovic | 2–1 | 2010 (Nadal), 2011 (Djokovic), 2013 (Nadal) |
| (Russia) Daniil Medvedev | (Serbia) Novak Djokovic | 1–1 | 2021 (Medvedev), 2023 (Djokovic) |

=== Most consecutive finals in the Open Era ===
| Player | Number | Years | Results | |
| Player | Number | Years | Won | Lost |
|---|---|---|---|---|
| (Czechoslovakia) Ivan Lendl | 8 | 1982–89 | 3 | 5 |
| (Switzerland) Roger Federer | 6 | 2004–09 | 5 | 1 |
| (United States) Jimmy Connors | 5 | 1974–78 | 3 | 2 |
| (Serbia) Novak Djokovic | 4 | 2010–13 | 1 | 3 |
| (United States) John McEnroe | 3 | 1979–81 | 3 | 0 |
| (United States) Pete Sampras | 3 | 2000–02 | 1 | 2 |
| (Australia) Tony Roche | 2 | 1969–70 | 0 | 2 |
| (Sweden) Björn Borg | 2 | 1980–81 | 0 | 2 |
| (United States) Jimmy Connors | 2 | 1982–83 | 2 | 0 |
| (United States) John McEnroe | 2 | 1984–85 | 1 | 1 |
| (Sweden) Mats Wilander | 2 | 1987–88 | 1 | 1 |
| (Sweden) Stefan Edberg | 2 | 1991–92 | 2 | 0 |
| (United States) Pete Sampras | 2 | 1992–93 | 1 | 1 |
| (United States) Andre Agassi | 2 | 1994–95 | 1 | 1 |
| (United States) Pete Sampras | 2 | 1995–96 | 2 | 0 |
| (Australia) Patrick Rafter | 2 | 1997–98 | 2 | 0 |
| (Spain) Rafael Nadal | 2 | 2010–11 | 1 | 1 |
| (Serbia) Novak Djokovic | 2 | 2015–16 | 1 | 1 |
| (Italy) Jannik Sinner | 2 | 2024–25 | 1 | 1 |

Bolded years^ indicates active or current streak

== Women ==
During the 56 times that this tournament has been held in the Open Era, 45 women have reached the US Open women's singles final. Women from the United States are by far the most numerous, although Australia, Czechoslovakia, Germany, Spain, Yugoslavia, Switzerland, Belgium, Russia, and Italy also have made significant contributions.

- * = Champion

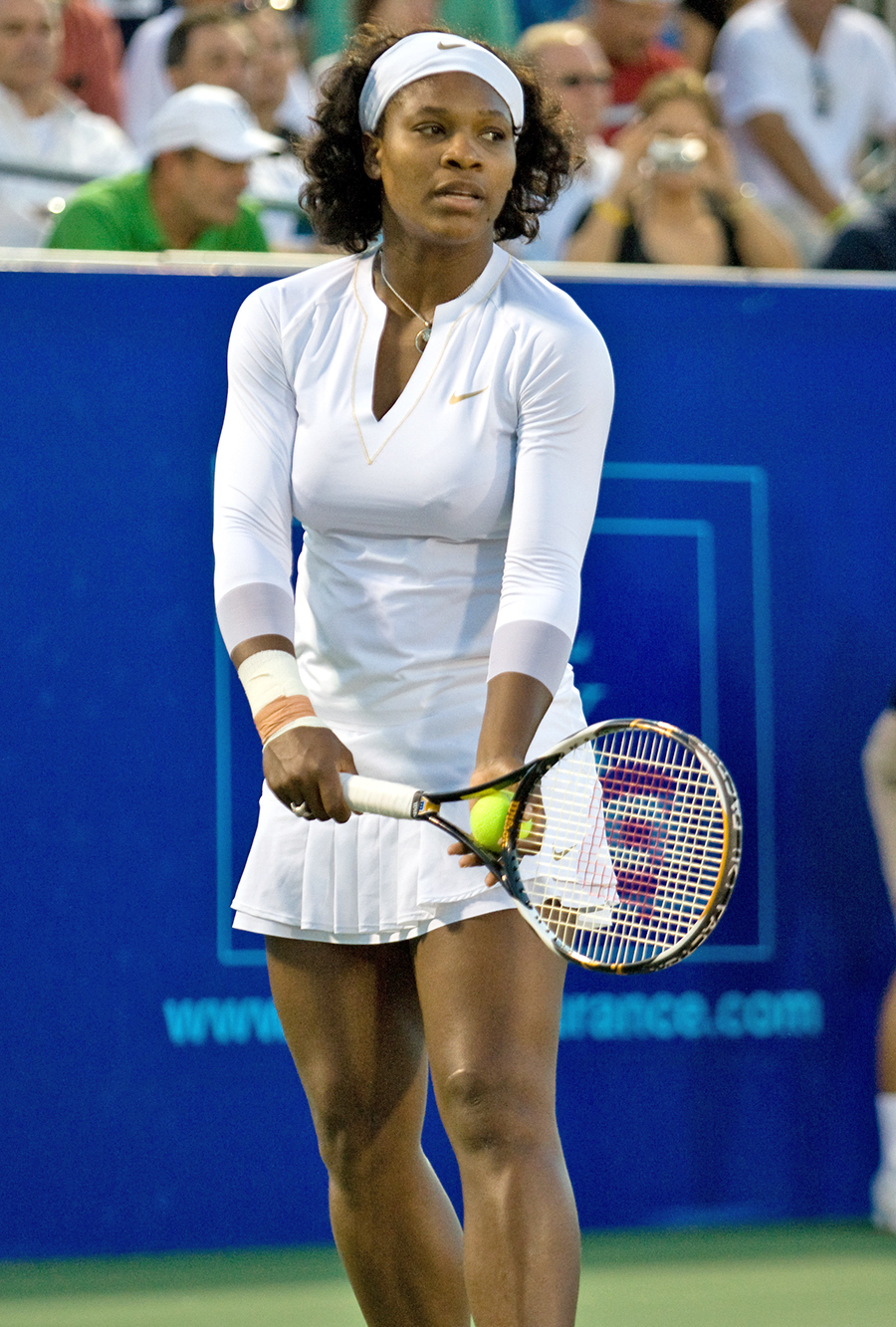
Serena Williams, a ten-time finalist (six wins).

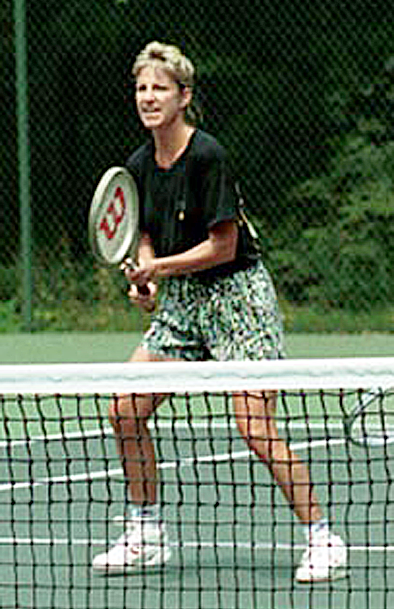
Chris Evert, a nine-time finalist (six wins).

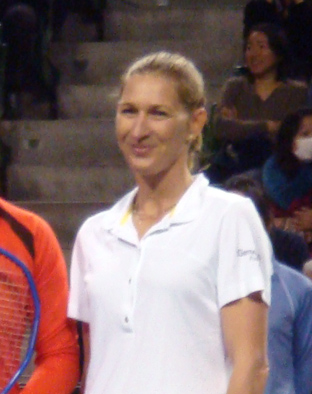
Steffi Graf, an eight-time finalist (five wins).

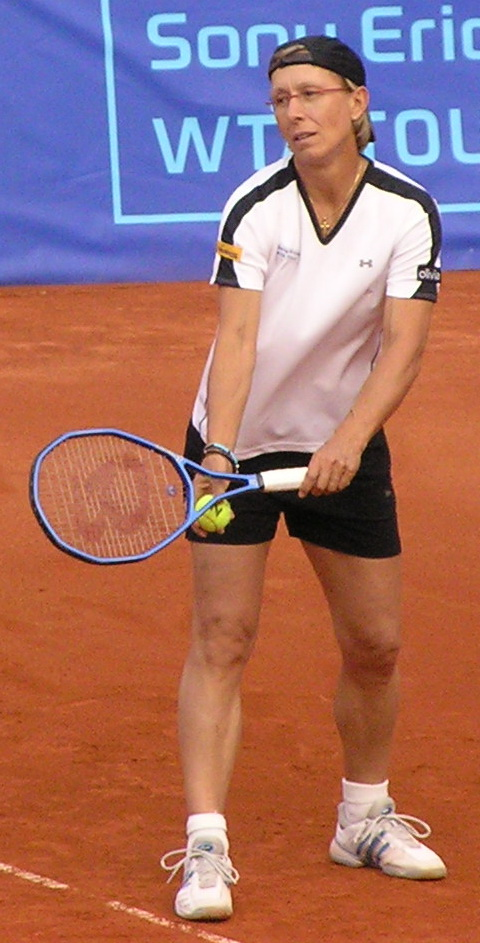
Martina Navratilova, an eight-time finalist (four wins).

| Country | Player | Finals | Win-Loss | Year(s) |
|---|---|---|---|---|
| USA | Serena Williams | 10 | 6–4 | 1999*, 2001, 2002*, 2008*, 2011, 2012*, 2013*, 2014*, 2018, 2019 |
| USA | Chris Evert | 9 | 6–3 | 1975*, 1976*, 1977*, 1978*, 1979, 1980*, 1982*, 1983, 1984 |
| GER | Steffi Graf | 8 | 5–3 | 1987, 1988*, 1989*, 1990, 1993*, 1994, 1995*, 1996* |
| USA^{[a]} | Martina Navratilova | 8 | 4–4 | 1981, 1983*, 1984*, 1985, 1986*, 1987*, 1989, 1991 |
| USA | Billie Jean King | 4 | 3–1 | 1969, 1971*, 1972*, 1974* |
| BEL | Kim Clijsters | 4 | 3–1 | 2003, 2005*, 2009*, 2010* |
| YUG; USA^{[b]} | Monica Seles | 4 | 2–2 | 1991*, 1992*, 1995, 1996 |
| USA | Venus Williams | 4 | 2–2 | 1997, 2000*, 2001*, 2002 |
| AUS | Evonne Goolagong Cawley | 4 | 0–4 | 1973, 1974, 1975, 1976 |
| [[|]] (Note: Although Sabalenka is from Belarus (BLR), she competed under no flag due to the Russian invasion of Ukraine.) | Aryna Sabalenka | 4 | 2–2 | 2023, 2024*, 2025* 2026 |
| AUS | Margaret Court | 3 | 3–0 | 1969*, 1970*, 1973* |
| BEL | Justine Henin | 3 | 2–1 | 2003*, 2006, 2007* |
| CZS | Hana Mandlíková | 3 | 1–2 | 1980, 1982, 1985* |
| SUI | Martina Hingis | 3 | 1–2 | 1997*, 1998, 1999 |
| BLR | Victoria Azarenka | 3 | 0–3 | 2012, 2013, 2020 |
| USA | Tracy Austin | 2 | 2–0 | 1979*, 1981* |
| JPN | Naomi Osaka | 2 | 2–0 | 2018*, 2020* |
| ARG | Gabriela Sabatini | 2 | 1–1 | 1988, 1990* |
| ESP | Arantxa Sánchez Vicario | 2 | 1–1 | 1992, 1994* |
| USA | Lindsay Davenport | 2 | 1–1 | 1998*, 2000 |
| RUS | Svetlana Kuznetsova | 2 | 1–1 | 2004*, 2007 |
| USA | Rosemary Casals | 2 | 0–2 | 1970, 1971 |
| CZS; CZE | Helena Suková | 2 | 0–2 | 1986, 1993 |
| DEN | Caroline Wozniacki | 2 | 0–2 | 2009, 2014 |
| UK | Virginia Wade | 1 | 1–0 | 1968* |
| RUS | Maria Sharapova | 1 | 1–0 | 2006* |
| AUS | Samantha Stosur | 1 | 1–0 | 2011* |
| ITA | Flavia Pennetta | 1 | 1–0 | 2015* |
| GER | Angelique Kerber | 1 | 1–0 | 2016* |
| USA | Sloane Stephens | 1 | 1–0 | 2017* |
| CAN | Bianca Andreescu | 1 | 1–0 | 2019* |
| GBR | Emma Raducanu | 1 | 1–0 | 2021* |
| POL | Iga Świątek | 1 | 1–0 | 2022* |
| USA | Coco Gauff | 1 | 1–0 | 2023* |
| KAZ | Elena Rybakina | 1 | 1–0 | 2026* |
| USA | Nancy Richey | 1 | 0–1 | 1969 |
| AUS | Kerry Melville Reid | 1 | 0–1 | 1972 |
| AUS | Wendy Turnbull | 1 | 0–1 | 1977 |
| USA | Pam Shriver | 1 | 0–1 | 1978 |
| RUS | Elena Dementieva | 1 | 0–1 | 2004 |
| FRA | Mary Pierce | 1 | 0–1 | 2005 |
| SRB | Jelena Janković | 1 | 0–1 | 2008 |
| RUS | Vera Zvonareva | 1 | 0–1 | 2010 |
| ITA | Roberta Vinci | 1 | 0–1 | 2015 |
| CZE | Karolína Plíšková | 1 | 0–1 | 2016 |
| USA | Madison Keys | 1 | 0–1 | 2017 |
| CAN | Leylah Fernandez | 1 | 0–1 | 2021 |
| TUN | Ons Jabeur | 1 | 0–1 | 2022 |
| USA | Jessica Pegula | 1 | 0–1 | 2024 |

=== Most recent final ===
| Year | Country | Winner | Country | Runner-up |
|---|---|---|---|---|
| 2026 | KAZ | Elena Rybakina | [[|]] | Aryna Sabalenka |

=== Multiple-time opponents in the Open Era ===
| Opponents | | Record | Finals meetings |
|---|---|---|---|
| (United States) **Chris Evert** | (Australia) Evonne Goolagong Cawley | 2–0 | 1975, 1976 |
| (United States) **Chris Evert** | (Czechoslovakia) Hana Mandlíková | 2–0 | 1980, 1982 |
| (United States) **Martina Navratilova** | (United States) Chris Evert | 2–0 | 1983, 1984 |
| (West Germany) Steffi Graf | (United States) Martina Navratilova | 1–1 | 1987 (Navratilova), 1989 (Graf) |
| (West Germany) **Steffi Graf** | (United States) Monica Seles | 2–0 | 1995, 1996 |
| (United States) Serena Williams | (United States) Venus Williams | 1–1 | 2001 (Venus), 2002 (Serena) |
| (United States) **Serena Williams** | (Belarus) Victoria Azarenka | 2–0 | 2012, 2013 |

=== Most consecutive finals in the Open Era ===
| Player | Number | Years | Results | |
| Player | Number | Years | Won | Lost |
|---|---|---|---|---|
| (United States) Chris Evert | 6 | 1975–80 | 5 | 1 |
| (United States) Martina Navratilova | 5 | 1983–87 | 4 | 1 |
| (Australia) Evonne Goolagong Cawley | 4 | 1973–76 | 0 | 4 |
| (Germany) Steffi Graf | 4 | 1987–90 | 2 | 2 |
| (Germany) Steffi Graf | 4 | 1993–96 | 3 | 1 |
| (United States) Serena Williams | 4 | 2011–14 | 3 | 1 |
| Aryna Sabalenka | 4 | 2023–26 | 2 | 2 |
| (United States) Chris Evert | 3 | 1982–84 | 1 | 2 |
| (Switzerland) Martina Hingis | 3 | 1997–99 | 1 | 2 |
| (United States) Venus Williams | 3 | 2000–02 | 2 | 1 |
| (Australia) Margaret Court | 2 | 1969–70 | 2 | 0 |
| (United States) Rosemary Casals | 2 | 1970–71 | 0 | 2 |
| (United States) Billie Jean King | 2 | 1971–72 | 2 | 0 |
| (Socialist Federal Republic of Yugoslavia) Monica Seles | 2 | 1991–92 | 2 | 0 |
| (United States) Monica Seles | 2 | 1995–96 | 0 | 2 |
| (United States) Serena Williams | 2 | 2001–02 | 1 | 1 |
| (Belgium) Justine Henin | 2 | 2006–07 | 1 | 1 |
| (Belgium) Kim Clijsters | 2 | 2009–10 | 2 | 0 |
| (Belarus) Victoria Azarenka | 2 | 2012–13 | 0 | 2 |
| (United States) Serena Williams | 2 | 2018–19 | 0 | 2 |

Bolded years^ indicates active or current streak

== See also ==
- List of Australian Open singles finalists during the Open Era
- List of French Open singles finalists during the Open Era
- List of Wimbledon singles finalists during the Open Era

== Notes ==
- ^{A} Martina Navratilova was born in Czechoslovakia but lost her citizenship in 1975. She became a United States citizen in 1981. Her Czech citizenship was restored in 2008.
- ^{B} Monica Seles was born in Yugoslavia but became a United States citizen in 1994.
