= 1980 in tennis =

This page covers all the important events in the sport of tennis in 1980. It provides the results of notable tournaments throughout the year on both the men's and the women's tennis circuits, the Davis Cup, and the Federation Cup.

== Australian Open ==
Category	Champion(s)	Finalist(s)	Score
Men's singles	(United States) Brian Teacher	(Australia) Kim Warwick	7–5, 7–6^{(7–4)}, 6–3 (Note: It was Teacher's 1st and only career Grand Slam singles title.)
Women's singles	(Czechoslovakia) Hana Mandlíková	(Australia) Wendy Turnbull	6–0, 7–5 (Note: It was Mandlíková's 1st career Grand Slam singles title.)
Men's doubles	(Australia) Mark Edmondson (Australia) Kim Warwick	(Australia) Peter McNamara (Australia) Paul McNamee	7–5, 6–4 (Note: It was Edmondson's 2nd career Grand Slam title and his 2nd Australian Open title. It was Warwick's 2nd career Grand Slam title and his 2nd Australian Open title.)
Women's doubles	(United States) Betsy Nagelsen (United States) Martina Navratilova	(United States) Ann Kiyomura (United States) Candy Reynolds	6–4, 6–4 (Note: It was Nagelsen's 2nd and last career Grand Slam doubles title.) (Note: It was Navratilova's 7th career Grand Slam doubles title and her 1st title at the Australian Open.)
Mixed doubles	The competition was not held between 1970 and 1986.		

== French Open ==
Category	Champion(s)	Finalist(s)	Score
Men's singles	(Sweden) Björn Borg	(United States) Vitas Gerulaitis	6–4, 6–1, 6–2 (Note: It was Borg's 9th career Grand Slam title, and his 5th French Open title.)
Women's singles	(United States) Chris Evert	(Romania) Virginia Ruzici	6–0, 6–3 (Note: It was Evert's 10th career Grand Slam title, and her 4th French Open title.)
Men's doubles	(United States) Victor Amaya (United States) Hank Pfister	(United States) Brian Gottfried (Mexico) Raúl Ramírez	1–6, 6–4, 6–4, 6–3
Women's doubles	(United States) Kathy Jordan (United States) Anne Smith	(Argentina) Ivanna Madruga (Argentina) Adriana Villagrán	6–1, 6–0
Mixed doubles	(United States) Anne Smith (United States) Billy Martin	(Czechoslovakia) Renáta Tomanová (Czechoslovakia) Stanislav Birner	2–6, 6–4, 8–6

== Wimbledon ==
Category	Champion(s)	Finalist(s)	Score
Men's singles	(Sweden) Björn Borg	(United States) John McEnroe	1–6, 7–5, 6–3, 6–7^{(16–18)}, 8–6 (Note: It was Borg's 10th career Grand Slam singles title and his 5th and last title at Wimbledon.)
Women's singles	(Australia) Evonne Goolagong Cawley	(United States) Chris Evert Lloyd	6–1, 7–6^{(7–4)} (Note: It was Cawley's 7th and last career Grand Slam singles title and her 2nd title at Wimbledon.)
Men's doubles	(Australia) Peter McNamara (Australia) Paul McNamee	(United States) Bob Lutz (United States) Stan Smith	7–6^{(7–5)}, 6–3, 6–7^{(4–7)}, 6–4 (Note: It was McNamara's 2nd career Grand Slam title and his 1st Wimbledon title. It was McNamee's 2nd career Grand Slam title and his 1st Wimbledon title.)
Women's doubles	(United States) Kathy Jordan (United States) Anne Smith	(United States) Rosie Casals (Australia) Wendy Turnbull	4–6, 7–5, 6–1 (Note: It was Jordan's 2nd career Grand Slam title and her 1st Wimbledon title. It was Smith's 3rd career Grand Slam title and her 1st Wimbledon title.)
Mixed doubles	(United States) John Austin (United States) Tracy Austin	(Australia) Mark Edmondson (Australia) Dianne Fromholtz	4–6, 7–6 ^{(8–6)}, 6–3 (Note: It was John Austin's only career Grand Slam title. It was Tracy Austin's 2nd career Grand Slam title and her only Wimbledon title.)

== US Open ==
Category	Champion(s)	Finalist(s)	Score
Men's singles	(United States) John McEnroe	(Sweden) Björn Borg	7–6 ^{(7–4)}, 6–1, 6–7^{(5–7)}, 5–7, 6–4 (Note: It was McEnroe's 2nd career Grand Slam singles title and his 2nd consecutive US Open title.)
Women's singles	(United States) Chris Evert-Lloyd	(Czechoslovakia) Hana Mandlíková	5–7, 6–1, 6–1 (Note: It was Evert-Lloyd's 14th career Grand Slam title and her 5th US Open title.)
Men's doubles	(United States) Bob Lutz (United States) Stan Smith	(United States) John McEnroe (United States) Peter Fleming	7–6, 3–6, 6–1, 3–6, 6–3 (Note: It was Lutz's 5th and last career Grand Slam title and his 4th US Open title. It was Smith's 7th and last career Grand Slam title and his 5th US Open title.)
Women's doubles	(United States) Billie Jean King (United States) Martina Navratilova	(United States) Pam Shriver (Netherlands) Betty Stöve	7–6 ^{(7–2)}, 7–5 (Note: It was King's 39th and last career Grand Slam title and her 13th US Open title. It was Navratilova's 9th career Grand Slam title and her 3rd US Open title.)
Mixed doubles	(Australia) Wendy Turnbull (United States) Marty Riessen	(Netherlands) Betty Stöve (South Africa) Frew McMillan	7–5, 6–2 (Note: It was Turnbull's 5th career Grand Slam title and her 2nd US Open title. It was Riessen's 9th and last career Grand Slam title and his 5th US Open title.)

== Davis Cup ==
Semifinals; 19–21 September
Buenos Aires, Argentina (clay)
AME	Argentina	2
EUR-B	Czechoslovakia	3
Rome, Italy (clay)
EAS	Australia	2
EUR-A	Italy	3

Final; 5–7 December
Prague, Czechoslovakia (indoor carpet)
EUR-B	Czechoslovakia	4
EUR-A	Italy	1

== Federation Cup ==
First Round
United States	3
Poland	0
New Zealand	2
Mexico	0
Belgium	0
Italy	3
South Korea	0
Soviet Union	3
Switzerland	3
Denmark	0
Ireland	0
Romania	3
Canada	1
Yugoslavia	2
Hungary	0
Czechoslovakia	3
Great Britain	3
Israel	0
Argentina	2
Netherlands	1
Luxembourg	0
Spain	3
Austria	0
West Germany	3
France	1
Sweden	2
Japan	3
Thailand	0
Chinese Taipei	0
Indonesia	3
Norway	0
Australia	3

Second Round
United States	3
New Zealand	0
Italy	1
Soviet Union	2
Switzerland	1
Romania	2
Yugoslavia	0
Czechoslovakia	3
Great Britain	2
Argentina	1
Spain	1
West Germany	2
Sweden	2
Japan	1
Indonesia	0
Australia	3

Quarterfinals
United States	3
Soviet Union	0
Romania	1
Czechoslovakia	2
Great Britain	0
West Germany	3
Sweden	1
Australia	2

Semifinals
United States	3
Czechoslovakia	0
West Germany	1
Australia	2

Final
United States	3
Australia	0
