= 1980 French Open – Mixed doubles =

Mixed doubles
- 1980 French Open

Final
- Champion: (United States) Anne Smith (United States) Billy Martin
- Runner-up: (Czechoslovakia) Renáta Tomanová (Czechoslovakia) Stanislav Birner
- Score: 2–6, 6–4, 8–6

Details
- Draw: 32

Events
Singles	men	women		boys	girls
Doubles	men	women	mixed	boys	girls
WC Singles	men	women	quad
WC Doubles	men	women	quad
Legends	−45	45+	women
- French Open

The mixed doubles tournament at the 1980 French Open was held from 26 May to 8 June 1980 on the outdoor clay courts at the Stade Roland Garros in Paris, France. Billy Martin and Anne Smith won the title, defeating Stanislav Birner and Renáta Tomanová in the final.

== Draw ==
Key

- Q = Qualifier
- WC = Wild card
- LL = Lucky loser
- Alt = Alternate
- ITF = ITF entry
- PR = Protected ranking
- SR = Special ranking
- SE = Special exempt
- JE = Junior exempt
- JR = Junior Accelerator Programme entrant
- CO = College Accelerator Programme entrant
- NG = Next Gen Accelerator Program entrant
- w/o = Walkover
- r = Retired
- d = Defaulted

=== Finals ===
Semifinals
(United States) Anne Smith (United States) Billy Martin	6	6
(France) Dominique Beillan (France) Patrice Dominguez	3	2
(Czechoslovakia) Renáta Tomanová (Czechoslovakia) Stanislav Birner	6	3	6
(United States) Leslie Allen (United States) Christopher Lewis	2	6	1

Final
(United States) Anne Smith (United States) Billy Martin	2	6	8
(Czechoslovakia) Renáta Tomanová (Czechoslovakia) Stanislav Birner	6	4	6

=== Top half ===
First round
(United States) A Smith (United States) B Martin	6	6
(Argentina) A Villagrán (Argentina) JC Santiago	1	0
(France) C Franch (France) T Kuentz	6	5	4
(France) A-M Cassaigne (France) B Renoult	4	7	6
(France) E Dinopoulos (France) É Plamont	2	6	6
(United States) K Jones (United States) M Robinson	6	3	2
(France) A Feraud (France) C Lesage	3	4
(United States) R Blount (France) A Jumatano	6	6
(United States) A Jaeger (South Africa) R Moore
(Switzerland) H Strachoňová (Canada) J Brabenec	w/o
(France) D Beillan (France) P Dominguez	6	6
(Italy) P Murgo (Peru) C Proano	4	2
(France) C Glaszmann (France) D Naegelen	4	2
(United States) K Jordan (United States) T Garcia	6	6
(France) N Fuchs (France) P Proisy	6	4	1
(Argentina) V Segal (Ecuador) A Gómez	3	6	6

Second round
(United States) A Smith (United States) B Martin	6	6
(France) A-M Cassaigne (France) B Renoult	0	0
(France) E Dinopoulos (France) É Plamont	4	6
(United States) R Blount (France) A Jumatano	6	7
(Switzerland) H Strachoňová (Canada) J Brabenec	2	4
(France) D Beillan (France) P Dominguez	6	6
(United States) K Jordan (United States) T Garcia	6	3	6
(Argentina) V Segal (Ecuador) A Gómez	3	6	8

Quarterfinals
(United States) A Smith (United States) B Martin	6	6
(United States) R Blount (France) A Jumatano	0	2
(France) D Beillan (France) P Dominguez	6	1	6
(Argentina) V Segal (Ecuador) A Gómez	4	6	4

Semifinals
(United States) A Smith (United States) B Martin	6	6
(France) D Beillan (France) P Dominguez	3	2

=== Bottom half ===
First round
(Czechoslovakia) R Tomanová (Czechoslovakia) S Birner	7	7
(United States) P Smith (West Germany) P Holl	5	6
(United States) E Burgin (United States) S Giammalva	6	7
(France) G Lovera (France) J Lovera	3	6
(Chile) S Urroz (Spain) R Vizcaíno	6	7
(France) F Guédy (France) J Thamin	4	6
(United States) D Gilbert (United States) B Gilbert	6	4
(Romania) L Romanov (France) S Krulevitz	7	7
(Peru) P Vásquez (Chile) B Prajoux	7	4	8
(France) M-C Calleja (France) P Barthes	6	6	6
(Argentina) L Giussani (Argentina) E Giussani	4	3
(France) F Dürr (France) J-C Barclay	6	6
(Romania) M Romanov (Brazil) T Koch	6	6
(France) M Bureau (France) Bensua	1	4
(United States) L Allen (United States) C Lewis	6	6
(United States) S Margolin (United States) F Buehning	4	1

Second round
(Czechoslovakia) R Tomanová (Czechoslovakia) S Birner	6	6	6
(United States) E Burgin (United States) S Giammalva	7	3	2
(Chile) S Urroz (Spain) R Vizcaíno	6	3
(Romania) L Romanov (France) S Krulevitz	7	6
(Peru) P Vásquez (Chile) B Prajoux	2	3
(France) F Dürr (France) J-C Barclay	6	6
(Romania) M Romanov (Brazil) T Koch	4	4
(United States) L Allen (United States) C Lewis	6	6

Quarterfinals
(Czechoslovakia) R Tomanová (Czechoslovakia) S Birner	7	6
(Romania) L Romanov (France) S Krulevitz	5	4
(France) F Dürr (France) J-C Barclay	3	6
(United States) L Allen (United States) C Lewis	6	7

Semifinals
(Czechoslovakia) R Tomanová (Czechoslovakia) S Birner	6	3	6
(United States) L Allen (United States) C Lewis	2	6	1
