= Christopher Lewis (tennis) =

American tennis player

J. Christopher Lewis
- Full name: John Christopher Lewis
- Country (sports): United States
- Born: April 2, 1956 (age 70) Santa Monica, California
- Plays: Right-handed

Singles
- Career record: 5–16
- Career titles: 0
- Highest ranking: No. 90 (Fall 1978)

Doubles
- Career record: 6–9
- Career titles: 0

Grand Slam doubles results
- French Open: 2R (1980)

Grand Slam mixed doubles results
- French Open: SF (1980)
- Wimbledon: 2R (1980)

John Christopher Lewis (born April 2, 1956) is a former professional tennis player from the United States.

== Biography ==
Born in Santa Monica, California, Lewis earned both an undergraduate degree in finance and accounting (1978) and a master's degree in business administration (1981) at the University of Southern California (USC). At USC he received an NCAA Post Graduate Scholarship which recognizes student-athletes who excel in both athletics and academics.

=== Tennis career ===
Lewis was a three-time All-American for the USC Trojans and partnered with Bruce Manson to win the doubles title at the 1977 NCAA Division I Tennis Championships where he also reached the semi-finals in singles.

As a professional player, he competed for two years on the Grand Prix tennis circuit. During this time, he played in the U.S. Open, the French Open, the Australian Open, and several tournaments across the globe.

At the 1980 French Open he was a semi-finalist in the mixed doubles, with Leslie Allen. The pair hadn't dropped a set until they lost their semi-final in three sets to Czechoslovaks Stanislav Birner and Renáta Tomanová. He also competed in the men's doubles draw with USC teammate Glenn Petrovic. His best result came at the 1979 New South Wales Open, where he and Steve Docherty were runners-up in the doubles event, to Peter McNamara and Paul McNamee.

=== Business ===
Lewis co-founded RLH Equity Partners in 1982, a private equity firm, with Richard Riordan, who was later Mayor of Los Angeles . The firm partners with entrepreneurs in high-growth, high-end service companies that focus on technology transformation.

== Grand Prix career finals ==
=== Doubles: 1 (0–1) ===
Result	Date	Tournament	Surface	Partner	Opponent	Score
Loss	Dec 1979	Sydney Outdoor, Australia	Grass	(Australia) Steve Docherty	(Australia) Peter McNamara (Australia) Paul McNamee	6–7, 3–6
