= 1980 French Open – Men's doubles =

Men's doubles
- 1980 French Open

Final
- Champion: (United States) Victor Amaya (United States) Hank Pfister
- Runner-up: (United States) Brian Gottfried (Mexico) Raúl Ramírez
- Score: 1–6, 6–4, 6–4, 6–3

Details
- Draw: 64
- Seeds: 16

Events
Singles	men	women		boys	girls
Doubles	men	women	mixed	boys	girls
WC Singles	men	women	quad
WC Doubles	men	women	quad
Legends	−45	45+	women
← 1979 ·	French Open	· 1981 →

The men's doubles tournament at the 1980 French Open was held from 26 May to 8 June 1980 on the outdoor clay courts at the Stade Roland Garros in Paris, France. Victor Amaya and Hank Pfister won the title, defeating Brian Gottfried and Raúl Ramírez in the final.

== Seeds ==
1. (United States) Brian Gottfried / (Mexico) Raúl Ramírez (final)
2. (United States) Peter Fleming / (Czechoslovakia) Tomáš Šmíd (third round)
3. (Australia) Paul McNamee / (Australia) Peter McNamara (third round)
4. (Switzerland) Heinz Günthardt / (Czechoslovakia) Pavel Složil (quarterfinals)
5. (Italy) Paolo Bertolucci / (Italy) Adriano Panatta (quarterfinals)
6. (Poland) Wojciech Fibak / (Czechoslovakia) Ivan Lendl (semifinals)
7. (Paraguay) Francisco González / (United States) Bob Lutz (quarterfinals)
8. (United States) Tim Gullikson / (United States) Tom Gullikson (third round)
9. (United States) Bruce Manson / (Hungary) Balázs Taróczy (semifinals)
10. (United States) Kevin Curren / (United States) Steve Denton (second round)
11. (Australia) Ross Case / (Australia) Geoff Masters (third round)
12. (United States) Victor Amaya / (United States) Hank Pfister (champions)
13. (Czechoslovakia) Stanislav Birner / (Czechoslovakia) Jan Kodeš (first round)
14. (United States) Vitas Gerulaitis / (Australia) Fred Stolle (quarterfinals)
15. (Australia) Mark Edmondson / (Australia) Kim Warwick (third round)
16. (United States) Billy Martin / (United States) Ferdi Taygan (third round)

== Draw ==
=== Key ===
- Q = Qualifier
- WC = Wild card
- LL = Lucky loser
- Alt = Alternate
- ITF = ITF entry
- PR = Protected ranking
- SR = Special ranking
- SE = Special exempt
- JE = Junior exempt
- JR = Junior Accelerator Programme entrant
- CO = College Accelerator Programme entrant
- NG = Next Gen Accelerator Program entrant
- w/o = Walkover
- r = Retired
- d = Defaulted

=== Finals ===
Quarterfinals
1	(United States) Brian Gottfried (Mexico) Raúl Ramírez	7	6
7	(Paraguay) Francisco González (United States) Bob Lutz	6	1
4	(Switzerland) Heinz Günthardt (Czechoslovakia) Pavel Složil	6	3	3
6	(Poland) Wojciech Fibak (Czechoslovakia) Ivan Lendl	1	6	6
5	(Italy) Paolo Bertolucci (Italy) Adriano Panatta	6	6	4
9	(United States) Bruce Manson (Hungary) Balázs Taróczy	4	7	6
14	(United States) Vitas Gerulaitis (Australia) Fred Stolle	3	4
12	(United States) Victor Amaya (United States) Hank Pfister	6	6

Semifinals
1	(United States) Brian Gottfried (Mexico) Raúl Ramírez	6	6	6
6	(Poland) Wojciech Fibak (Czechoslovakia) Ivan Lendl	4	4	4
9	(United States) Bruce Manson (Hungary) Balázs Taróczy	2	6	3	2
12	(United States) Victor Amaya (United States) Hank Pfister	6	4	6	6

Final
1	(United States) Brian Gottfried (Mexico) Raúl Ramírez	6	4	4	3
12	(United States) Victor Amaya (United States) Hank Pfister	1	6	6	6

=== Top half ===
==== Section 1 ====
First round
1	(United States) B Gottfried (Mexico) R Ramírez	7	6
(United States) M Barr (Zimbabwe) H Ismail	5	3
(Australia) D Carter (New Zealand) C Lewis	6	6
(United States) C Mayotte (United States) L Stefanki	1	3
(United States) JC Lewis (United States) G Petrovic	6	6
(United States) G Holroyd (United States) C Wittus	4	4
11	(Australia) R Case (Australia) G Masters	6	7
(Argentina) G Guerrero (Argentina) G Tiberti	4	5
10	(United States) K Curren (United States) S Denton	6	6
(France) H Gauvain (France) J Vanier	4	2
(West Germany) J Fassbender (South Africa) R Moore	6	6
(Bolivia) R Benavides (Argentina) F Dalla Fontana	4	0
(Switzerland) M Günthardt (Netherlands) L Sanders	6	6	6
(France) P Dominguez (France) P Proisy	7	2	4
7	(Paraguay) F González (United States) B Lutz	6	6
(Canada) R Bettauer (New Zealand) P Hampton	2	3

Second round
1	(United States) B Gottfried (Mexico) R Ramírez	6	6
(Australia) D Carter (New Zealand) C Lewis	1	4
(United States) JC Lewis (United States) G Petrovic	6	3	3
11	(Australia) R Case (Australia) G Masters	4	6	6
10	(United States) K Curren (United States) S Denton	6	6
(West Germany) J Fassbender (South Africa) R Moore	7	7
(Switzerland) M Günthardt (Netherlands) L Sanders	3	3
7	(Paraguay) F González (United States) B Lutz	6	6

Third round
1	(United States) B Gottfried (Mexico) R Ramírez	6	6
11	(Australia) R Case (Australia) G Masters	4	3
(West Germany) J Fassbender (South Africa) R Moore	1	4
7	(Paraguay) F González (United States) B Lutz	6	6

Quarterfinals
1	(United States) B Gottfried (Mexico) R Ramírez	7	6
7	(Paraguay) F González (United States) B Lutz	6	1

==== Section 2 ====
First round
4	(Switzerland) H Günthardt (Czechoslovakia) P Složil	6	6
(France) P Beust (France) D Naegelen	1	4
(Japan) T Fukui (West Germany) P Holl	7	4	6
(France) JL Cotard (France) T Tulasne	5	6	1
(France) P Barthès (France) F Jauffret	6	6
(Argentina) A Gattiker (Argentina) C Gattiker	4	2
(France) Y Noah (France) P Portes	5	6	6
13	(Czechoslovakia) S Birner (Czechoslovakia) J Kodeš	7	4	4
16	(United States) B Martin (United States) F Taygan	6	6
(France) R Brunet (France) J-F Caujolle	3	2
(Chile) A Fillol (Mexico) E Montaño	5	6	10
(France) É Deblicker (France) G Goven	7	1	8
(Socialist Federal Republic of Yugoslavia) Ž Franulović (Ecuador) A Gómez	6	6	6
(Colombia) C Behar (United States) L Davidson	7	3	3
6	(Poland) W Fibak (Czechoslovakia) I Lendl	6	6
(United States) B Maze (United States) B Nichols	2	1

Second round
4	(Switzerland) H Günthardt (Czechoslovakia) P Složil	6	6	6
(Japan) T Fukui (West Germany) P Holl	1	7	2
(France) P Barthès (France) F Jauffret	4	4
(France) Y Noah (France) P Portes	6	3^{r}
16	(United States) B Martin (United States) F Taygan	7	3	6
(Chile) A Fillol (Mexico) E Montaño	5	6	3
(Socialist Federal Republic of Yugoslavia) Ž Franulović (Ecuador) A Gómez	4	2
6	(Poland) W Fibak (Czechoslovakia) I Lendl	6	6

Third round
4	(Switzerland) H Günthardt (Czechoslovakia) P Složil	6	6
(France) P Barthès (France) F Jauffret	1	1
16	(United States) B Martin (United States) F Taygan	3	4
6	(Poland) W Fibak (Czechoslovakia) I Lendl	6	6

Quarterfinals
4	(Switzerland) H Günthardt (Czechoslovakia) P Složil	6	3	3
6	(Poland) W Fibak (Czechoslovakia) I Lendl	1	6	6

=== Bottom half ===
==== Section 3 ====
First round
5	(Italy) P Bertolucci (Italy) A Panatta	7	6
(United States) G Hardie (United States) T Waltke	6	3
(United States) A Kohlberg (Ecuador) R Ycaza	6	6
(Chile) H Gildemeister (Chile) A Pierola	3	0
(Australia) J James (Australia) T Rocavert	6	6
(France) C Lesage (France) J-M Piacentile	2	3
15	(Australia) M Edmondson (Australia) K Warwick	6	7
(United States) S Carnahan (Canada) J Brabenec	1	6
9	(United States) B Manson (Hungary) B Taróczy	6	6	6
(France) H Leconte (France) J Potier	7	4	2
(France) J-L Haillet (France) G Moretton	6	6
(Argentina) G Aubone (France) J Thamin	4	0
(France) D Bedel (France) C Roger-Vasselin	6	7
(Colombia) I Molina (Chile) P Rebolledo	2	6
3	(Australia) P McNamee (Australia) P McNamara	6	6
(United States) M Cahill (New Zealand) R Simpson	3	2

Second round
5	(Italy) P Bertolucci (Italy) A Panatta	6	6	6
(United States) A Kohlberg (Ecuador) R Ycaza	4	7	3
(Australia) J James (Australia) T Rocavert	6	4	5
15	(Australia) M Edmondson (Australia) K Warwick	4	6	7
9	(United States) B Manson (Hungary) B Taróczy	5
(France) J-L Haillet (France) G Moretton	1^{r}
(France) D Bedel (France) C Roger-Vasselin	3	5
3	(Australia) P McNamee (Australia) P McNamara	6	7

Third round
5	(Italy) P Bertolucci (Italy) A Panatta	6	6
15	(Australia) M Edmondson (Australia) K Warwick	3	4
9	(United States) B Manson (Hungary) B Taróczy	6	6	6
3	(Australia) P McNamee (Australia) P McNamara	7	3	4

Quarterfinals
5	(Italy) P Bertolucci (Italy) A Panatta	6	6	4
9	(United States) B Manson (Hungary) B Taróczy	4	7	6

==== Section 4 ====
First round
8	(United States) Ti Gullikson (United States) To Gullikson	7	6
(Colombia) C Gómez (Colombia) G Monroy	6	1
(France) C Freyss (France) B Fritz	6	6	7
(United States) M Doyle (United States) B Foxworth	7	3	5
(South Africa) B Bertram (South Africa) B Mitton	6	6
(United States) J Etterbeek (United States) E Friedler	0	1
14	(United States) V Gerulaitis (Australia) F Stolle	7	6
(United States) T Crabel (United States) I Harris	5	4
12	(United States) V Amaya (United States) H Pfister	6	7
(Chile) B Prajoux (United States) E van Dillen	3	6
(United States) V Winitsky (South Africa) J Yuill	6	6
(Israel) S Glickstein (Australia) W Maher	3	4
(United States) T Garcia (United States) M Grant	7	6
(United States) S Davis (United States) Z Guerry	6	3
2	(United States) P Fleming (Czechoslovakia) T Šmíd	6	6
(Japan) S Sakamoto (Japan) S Nishio	2	1

Second round
8	(United States) Ti Gullikson (United States) To Gullikson	7	76
(France) C Freyss (France) B Fritz	5	2
(South Africa) B Bertram (South Africa) B Mitton	6	3	6
14	(United States) V Gerulaitis (Australia) F Stolle	3	6	8
12	(United States) V Amaya (United States) H Pfister	7	6
(United States) V Winitsky (South Africa) J Yuill	5	3
(United States) T Garcia (United States) M Grant	3	1
2	(United States) P Fleming (Czechoslovakia) T Šmíd	6	6

Third round
8	(United States) Ti Gullikson (United States) To Gullikson	2	1
14	(United States) V Gerulaitis (Australia) F Stolle	6	6
12	(United States) V Amaya (United States) H Pfister	6	6
2	(United States) P Fleming (Czechoslovakia) T Šmíd	1	3

Quarterfinals
14	(United States) V Gerulaitis (Australia) F Stolle	3	4
12	(United States) V Amaya (United States) H Pfister	6	6
