= Peter Holl =

German tennis player (born 1955)

- Country (sports): West Germany
- Born: 29 January 1955 (age 70)

Singles
- Highest ranking: No. 344 (22 December 1980)

Doubles
- Career record: 1–8

Grand Slam doubles results
- French Open: 2R (1980)

Grand Slam mixed doubles results
- French Open: 1R (1980)

Peter Holl (born 29 January 1955) is a German former professional tennis player.

A native of Cologne, Holl took up the sport of tennis at the age of seven and in 1975 joined the tennis team at Georgia Southern College, where he played for two seasons.

Holl featured in doubles main draws at two editions of the French Open, in 1980 and 1981. His best performance was a second round appearance in the men's doubles at the 1980 French Open, partnering Tsuyoshi Fukui.
