= 1980 French Open – Men's singles =

Men's singles
- 1980 French Open

Final
- Champion: (Sweden) Björn Borg
- Runner-up: (United States) Vitas Gerulaitis
- Score: 6–4, 6–1, 6–2

Details
- Draw: 128
- Seeds: 16

Events
| Singles | men | women | | boys | girls |
| Doubles | men | women | mixed | boys | girls |
| WC Singles | men | women | quad |
| WC Doubles | men | women | quad |
| Legends | −45 | 45+ | women |
- French Open

Two-time defending champion Björn Borg defeated Vitas Gerulaitis in the final, 6–4, 6–1, 6–2 to win the men's singles tennis title at the 1980 French Open. It was his fifth French Open title and ninth major title overall. For the second time, Borg did not lose a set during the tournament. Borg also lost no more than 4 games in a set and dropped just 38 games in the entire tournament.

== Seeds ==
The seeded players are listed below. Björn Borg is the champion; others show the round in which they were eliminated.

1. (Sweden) Björn Borg (champion)
2. (United States) John McEnroe (third round)
3. (United States) Jimmy Connors (semifinals)
4. (Argentina) Guillermo Vilas (quarterfinals)
5. (United States) Vitas Gerulaitis (final)
6. (United States) Harold Solomon (semifinals)
7. (United States) Eddie Dibbs (third round)
8. (Paraguay) Víctor Pecci Sr. (second round)
9. (Czechoslovakia) Ivan Lendl (third round)
10. (United States) Peter Fleming (second round)
11. (Spain) José Higueras (first round)
12. (Chile) Hans Gildemeister (quarterfinals)
13. (Poland) Wojciech Fibak (quarterfinals)
14. (United States) Victor Amaya (second round)
15. (Spain) Manuel Orantes (fourth round)
16. (Argentina) José Luis Clerc (second round)

== Draw ==
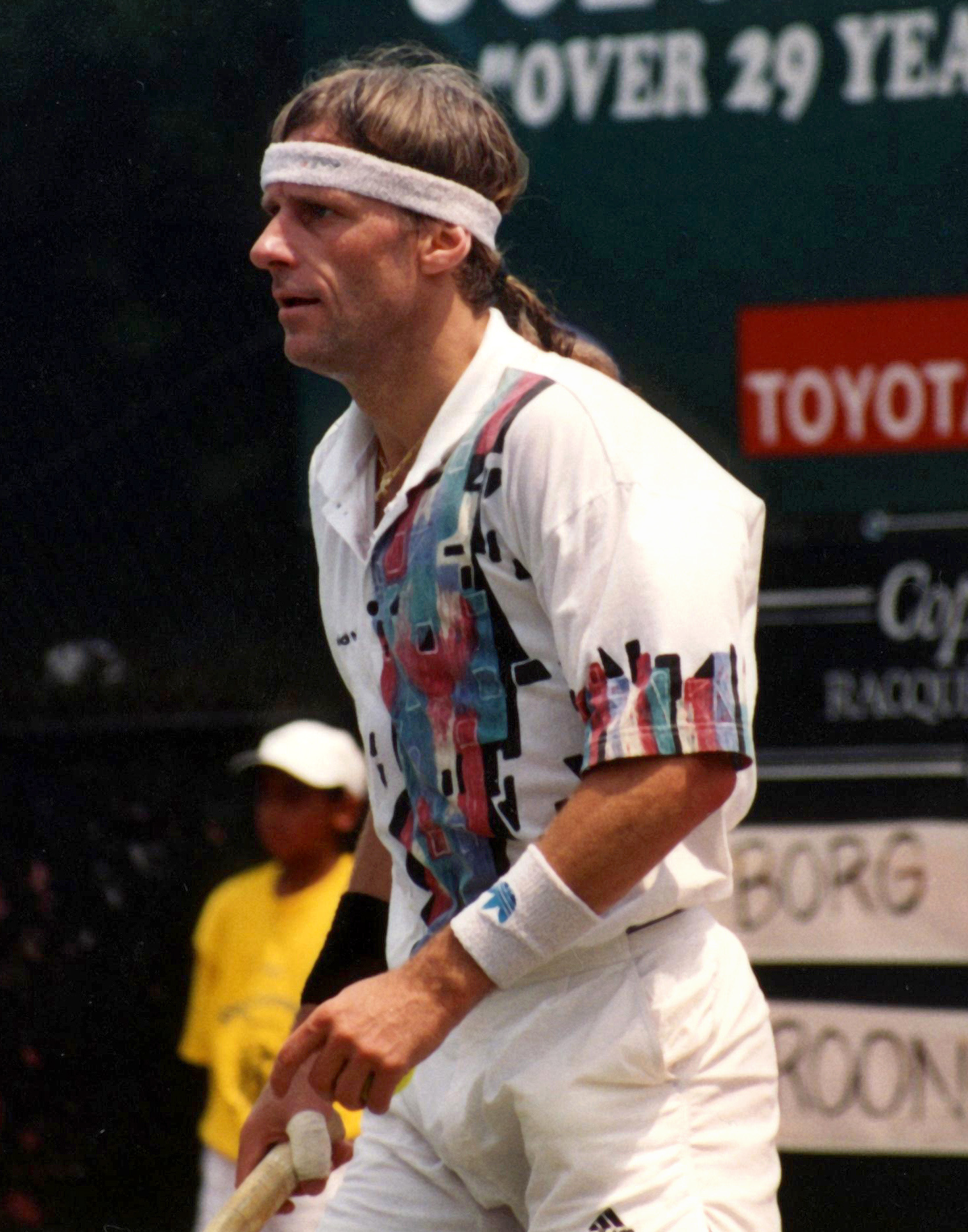
Björn Borg won his third consecutive French singles title and fifth in total.

Key

- Q = Qualifier
- WC = Wild card
- LL = Lucky loser
- Alt = Alternate
- ITF = ITF entry
- PR = Protected ranking
- SR = Special ranking
- SE = Special exempt
- JE = Junior exempt
- JR = Junior Accelerator Programme entrant
- CO = College Accelerator Programme entrant
- NG = Next Gen Accelerator Program entrant
- w/o = Walkover
- r = Retired
- d = Defaulted

=== Finals ===
Quarterfinals
1 | (Sweden) Björn Borg | 6 | 6 | 6
(Italy) Corrado Barazzutti | 0 | 3 | 3
4 | (Argentina) Guillermo Vilas | 6 | 4 | 6 | 5
6 | (United States) Harold Solomon | 1 | 6 | 7 | 7
12 | (Chile) Hans Gildemeister | 4 | 0 | 0
3 | (United States) Jimmy Connors | 6 | 6 | 6
5 | (United States) Vitas Gerulaitis | 6 | 5 | 6 | 3 | 6
13 | (Poland) Wojciech Fibak | 3 | 7 | 4 | 6 | 3

Semifinals
1 | (Sweden) Björn Borg | 6 | 6 | 6
6 | (United States) Harold Solomon | 2 | 2 | 0
3 | (United States) Jimmy Connors | 1 | 6 | 7 | 2 | 4
5 | (United States) Vitas Gerulaitis | 6 | 3 | 6 | 6 | 6

Final
1 | (Sweden) Björn Borg | 6 | 6 | 6
5 | (United States) Vitas Gerulaitis | 4 | 1 | 2

=== Top half ===
==== Section 1 ====
First round
1 | (Sweden) B Borg | 6 | 6 | 6
Q | (Chile) A Fillol | 3 | 1 | 4
(Paraguay) F González | 6 | 3 | 1 | 3
(Ecuador) A Gómez | 3 | 6 | 6 | 6
Q | (Belgium) T Stevaux | 6 | 3 | 3 | 3
Q | (Socialist Federal Republic of Yugoslavia) M Ostoja | 3 | 6 | 6 | 6
(France) P Portes | 6 | 6 | 3 | 6
(Colombia) A Cortes | 4 | 3 | 6 | 3
(France) G Moretton | 5 | 6 | 4 | 3
(United States) T Waltke | 7 | 3 | 6 | 6
(Hungary) B Taróczy | 6 | 6 | 6
(United States) S Davis | 2 | 0 | 4
(Switzerland) H Günthardt | 4 | 6 | 1 | 6 | 6
(France) B Fritz | 6 | 3 | 6 | 0 | 1
(France) C Freyss | 3 | 5 | 5
14 | (United States) V Amaya | 6 | 7 | 7

Second round
1 | (Sweden) B Borg | 6 | 6 | 6
(Ecuador) A Gómez | 2 | 2 | 1
Q | (Socialist Federal Republic of Yugoslavia) M Ostoja | 1 | 3 | 4
(France) P Portes | 6 | 6 | 6
(United States) T Waltke | 3 | 3 | 3
(Hungary) B Taróczy | 6 | 6 | 6
(Switzerland) H Günthardt | 7 | 4 | 6 | 6
14 | (United States) V Amaya | 6 | 6 | 3 | 4

Third round
1 | (Sweden) B Borg | 6 | 6 | 6
(France) P Portes | 3 | 0 | 1
(Hungary) B Taróczy | 6 | 6 | 6
(Switzerland) H Günthardt | 2 | 3 | 4

Fourth round
1 | (Sweden) B Borg | 6 | 6 | 6
(Hungary) B Taróczy | 2 | 2 | 0

==== Section 2 ====
First round
11 | (Spain) J Higueras | 2 | 4 | 4
(Australia) P McNamara | 6 | 6 | 6
(Zimbabwe) H Ismail | 3 | 0 | 6 | 6 | 6
(Colombia) I Molina | 6 | 6 | 3 | 4 | 4
(France) C Roger-Vasselin | 4 | 6 | 6 | 5 | 6
(France) E Deblicker | 6 | 4 | 1 | 7 | 4
(Czechoslovakia) T Šmid | 7 | 6 | 6
(United States) M Cahill | 5 | 2 | 3
(Australia) R Case | 2 | 4 | 1
(Italy) C Barazzutti | 6 | 6 | 6
(United States) T Gullikson | 6 | 6 | 6
(France) H Gauvain | 1 | 2 | 3
(Chile) B Prajoux | 1 | 6 | 6 | 4 | 6
(Socialist Federal Republic of Yugoslavia) Z Franulović | 6 | 2 | 4 | 6 | 2
(South Africa) R Moore | 2 | 6 | 2 | 0
8 | (Paraguay) V Pecci Sr. | 6 | 4 | 6 | 6

Second round
(Australia) P McNamara | 6 | 6 | 6
(Zimbabwe) H Ismail | 4 | 1 | 2
(France) C Roger-Vasselin | 3 | 6 | 6 | 3 | 6
(Czechoslovakia) T Šmid | 6 | 0 | 4 | 6 | 3
(Italy) C Barazzutti | 6 | 6 | 6
(United States) T Gullikson | 3 | 2 | 1
(Chile) B Prajoux | 7 | 6 | 6 | 7
8 | (Paraguay) V Pecci Sr. | 5 | 4 | 7 | 6

Third round
(Australia) P McNamara | 6 | 6 | 7 | 6
(France) C Roger-Vasselin | 7 | 2 | 6 | 4
(Italy) C Barazzutti | 6 | 6 | 6
(Chile) B Prajoux | 2 | 4 | 3

Fourth round
(Australia) P McNamara | 4 | 2 | 6
(Italy) C Barazzutti | 6 | 6 | 7

==== Section 3 ====
First round
4 | (Argentina) G Vilas | 6 | 6 | 6
Q | (Uruguay) J L Damiani | 2 | 2 | 0
(Brazil) C Motta | 7 | 3 | 6 | 2 | 3
(Brazil) T Koch | 6 | 6 | 4 | 6 | 6
(Netherlands) L Sanders | 6 | 6 | 6 | 6 | 6
(New Zealand) R Simpson | 1 | 7 | 7 | 4 | 4
Q | (Spain) A Giménez | 2 | 3 | 2
(United Kingdom) B Mottram | 6 | 6 | 6
(Sweden) K Johansson | 1 | 2 | 6 | 3
(United States) B Manson | 6 | 6 | 3 | 6
(United States) B Martin | 4 | 0 | 0
(France) D Bedel | 6 | 6 | 6
(Czechoslovakia) P Složil | 6 | 7 | 7
(United States) B Foxworth | 4 | 5 | 5
(United States) B Maze | 5 | 6 | 5 | 2
15 | (Spain) M Orantes | 7 | 1 | 7 | 6

Second round
4 | (Argentina) G Vilas | 6 | 6 | 6
(Brazil) T Koch | 2 | 2 | 3
(Netherlands) L Sanders | 3 | 4 | 1
(United Kingdom) B Mottram | 6 | 6 | 6
(United States) B Manson | 7 | 7 | 6
(France) D Bedel | 5 | 5 | 3
(Czechoslovakia) P Složil | 4 | 2 | 1
15 | (Spain) M Orantes | 6 | 6 | 6

Third round
4 | (Argentina) G Vilas | 6 | 6 | 6
(United Kingdom) B Mottram | 2 | 2 | 3
(United States) B Manson | 6 | 0 | 3
15 | (Spain) M Orantes | 7 | 6 | 6

Fourth round
4 | (Argentina) G Vilas
15 | (Spain) M Orantes | w/o

==== Section 4 ====
First round
9 | (Czechoslovakia) I Lendl | 7 | 6 | 6
(United States) S Mayer | 6 | 2 | 3
(Spain) J López-Maeso | 4 | 6 | 2
(West Germany) K Eberhard | 6 | 7 | 6
(Spain) M Mir | 4 | 0 | 4
(United States) B Gottfried | 6 | 6 | 6
Q | (United States) S Giammalva Jr. | 3 | 2 | 2
(Spain) F Luna | 6 | 6 | 6
(France) J-L Haillet | 1 | 4 | 2
(France) C Casa | 6 | 6 | 6
(United States) J Sadri | 4 | 4 | 4
(United States) V Winitsky | 6 | 6 | 6
(West Germany) A Maurer | 6 | 6 | 5 | 2
(New Zealand) C Lewis | 4 | 7 | 7 | 6
(Australia) G Masters | 6 | 3 | 4
6 | (United States) H Solomon | 7 | 6 | 6

Second round
9 | (Czechoslovakia) I Lendl | 6 | 3 | 6 | 7
(West Germany) K Eberhard | 4 | 6 | 4 | 6
(United States) B Gottfried | 6 | 7 | 6
(Spain) F Luna | 3 | 5 | 1
(France) C Casa | 6 | 7 | 5 | 2 | 2
(United States) V Winitsky | 4 | 6 | 7 | 6 | 6
(New Zealand) C Lewis | 3 | 3 | 3
6 | (United States) H Solomon | 6 | 6 | 6

Third round
9 | (Czechoslovakia) I Lendl | 6 | 6 | 6 | 5 | 3
(United States) B Gottfried | 2 | 7 | 1 | 7 | 6
(United States) V Winitsky | 7 | 4 | 5 | 4
6 | (United States) H Solomon | 6 | 6 | 7 | 6

Fourth round
(United States) B Gottfried | 0 | 1 | 3
6 | (United States) H Solomon | 6 | 6 | 6

=== Bottom half ===
==== Section 5 ====
First round
7 | (United States) E Dibbs | 6 | 6 | 6
(Argentina) C Gattiker | 2 | 1 | 2
(France) T Tulasne | 7 | 7 | 4
(Belgium) B Boileau | 5 | 5 | 3 | r
(Sweden) S Simonsson | 2 | 1 | 1
Q | (South Africa) J Yuill | 6 | 6 | 6
(Italy) G Ocleppo | 2 | r
(Mexico) R Ramírez | 5
(Brazil) J Soares | 6 | 6 | 6
Q | (Romania) F Segărceanu | 4 | 2 | 4
(United States) E Van Dillen | 6 | 6 | 4 | 4
(West Germany) R Gehring | 4 | 7 | 6 | 6
(United States) R Lutz | 6 | 6 | 6
(Zimbabwe) C Dowdeswell | 3 | 2 | 1
(Australia) D Carter | 4 | 1 | 2
12 | (Chile) H Gildemeister | 6 | 6 | 6

Second round
7 | (United States) E Dibbs | 6 | 6 | 7
(France) T Tulasne | 4 | 2 | 5
Q | (South Africa) J Yuill | 4 | 5 | 0
(Mexico) R Ramírez | 6 | 7 | 6
(Brazil) J Soares | 6 | 6 | 3 | 1 | 2
(West Germany) R Gehring | 4 | 4 | 6 | 6 | 6
(United States) R Lutz | 6 | 7 | 6 | 6 | 3r
12 | (Chile) H Gildemeister | 3 | 6 | 7 | 7 | 5

Third round
7 | (United States) E Dibbs | 3 | 5 | 2
(Mexico) R Ramírez | 6 | 7 | 6
(West Germany) R Gehring | 6 | 1 | 2 | 1
12 | (Chile) H Gildemeister | 3 | 6 | 6 | 6

Fourth round
(Mexico) R Ramírez | 6 | 3 | 6 | 3 | 8
12 | (Chile) H Gildemeister | 3 | 6 | 3 | 6 | 10

==== Section 6 ====
First round
16 | (Argentina) J L Clerc | 6 | 6 | 7
(Chile) A Pierola | 1 | 0 | 5
Q | (Spain) R Vizcaíno | 0 | 5 | 5
(France) Y Noah | 6 | 7 | 7
(Australia) M Edmondson | 4 | 6 | 3 | 0
(United States) E Teltscher | 6 | 3 | 6 | 6
(France) F Jauffret | 2 | 1 | 2
(Australia) K Warwick | 6 | 6 | 6
(France) H Leconte | 0 | 6 | 6 | 0
Q | (Sweden) H Simonsson | 6 | 3 | 7 | 6
(Italy) T Zugarelli | 6 | 6 | 6
(Australia) J James | 2 | 4 | 2
Q | (Brazil) M Hocevar | 1 | 4 | 4
(France) J-F Caujolle | 6 | 6 | 6
(Italy) A Panatta | 4 | 6 | 2 | 6
3 | (United States) J Connors | 6 | 4 | 6 | 7

Second round
16 | (Argentina) J L Clerc | 4 | 7 | 4 | 6 | 3
(France) Y Noah | 6 | 6 | 6 | 1 | 6
(United States) E Teltscher | 6 | 5 | 6 | 7
(Australia) K Warwick | 4 | 7 | 4 | 6
Q | (Sweden) H Simonsson | 5 | 0 | r
(Italy) T Zugarelli | 7 | 3
(France) J-F Caujolle | 6 | 6 | 5 | 1 | 1
3 | (United States) J Connors | 3 | 2 | 7 | 6 | 6

Third round
(France) Y Noah | 6 | 6 | 7
(United States) E Teltscher | 3 | 0 | 6
(Italy) T Zugarelli | 5 | 4 | 5
3 | (United States) J Connors | 7 | 6 | 7

Fourth round
(France) Y Noah | 5 | 4 | r
3 | (United States) J Connors | 7 | 6

==== Section 7 ====
First round
5 | (United States) V Gerulaitis | 1 | 6 | 5 | 6 | 6
(West Germany) P Elter | 6 | 1 | 7 | 2 | 2
(United States) F Buehning | 6 | 2 | 6 | 7 | 6
(United States) G Hardie | 7 | 6 | 2 | 6 | 3
(United States) C Mayotte | 6 | 4 | 4 | 4
(Czechoslovakia) J Kodeš | 4 | 6 | 6 | 6
(Czechoslovakia) S Birner | 6 | 6 | 6
(Israel) S Glickstein | 2 | 2 | 2
(United States) F McNair | 1 | 3 | 6 | 6 | 2
(Australia) T Rocavert | 6 | 6 | 4 | 4 | 6
(France) D Naegelen | 7 | 7 | 6
(Czechoslovakia) J Hřebec | 6 | 5 | 1
(United States) F Taygan | 6 | 7 | 6
(France) G Goven | 3 | 5 | 4
(South Africa) B Bertram | 3 | 3 | 2
10 | (United States) P Fleming | 6 | 6 | 6

Second round
5 | (United States) V Gerulaitis | 6 | 6 | 6
(United States) F Buehning | 1 | 2 | 1
(Czechoslovakia) J Kodeš | 2 | 2 | 3
(Czechoslovakia) S Birner | 6 | 6 | 6
(Australia) T Rocavert | 4 | 4 | 6 | 0
(France) D Naegelen | 6 | 6 | 2 | 6
(United States) F Taygan | 6 | 3 | 6 | 7
10 | (United States) P Fleming | 3 | 6 | 3 | 5

Third round
5 | (United States) V Gerulaitis | 6 | 4 | 6 | 6
(Czechoslovakia) S Birner | 1 | 6 | 2 | 1
(France) D Naegelen | 6 | 6 | 2 | 4 | 9
(United States) F Taygan | 4 | 3 | 6 | 6 | 11

Fourth round
5 | (United States) V Gerulaitis | 6 | 7 | 6
(United States) F Taygan | 3 | 5 | 1

==== Section 8 ====
First round
13 | (Poland) W Fibak | 6 | 7 | 6
Q | (Socialist Federal Republic of Yugoslavia) Z Ilin | 2 | 6 | 0
(United States) T Moor | 3 | 3 | 1
(United States) T Gullikson | 6 | 6 | 6
(New Zealand) O Parun | 3 | 7 | 5 | 0
(South Africa) B Mitton | 6 | 5 | 7 | 6
(United States) H Pfister | 4 | 4 | 7 | 7 | 5
(Italy) P Bertolucci | 6 | 6 | 6 | 6 | 7
(Australia) P McNamee | 7 | 6 | 7
(France) P Proisy | 6 | 2 | 6
(United States) C Delaney | 4 | 6 | 4 | 2
(United States) M Grant | 6 | 3 | 6 | 6
(Australia) W Maher | 7 | 4 | 5 | 2
(Sweden) P Hjertquist | 5 | 6 | 7 | 6
(France) P Dominguez | 6 | 0 | 0
2 | (United States) J McEnroe | 7 | 6 | 6

Second round
13 | (Poland) W Fibak | 6 | 6 | 6
(United States) T Gullikson | 3 | 4 | 1
(South Africa) B Mitton | 7 | 3 | 6 | 6 | 3
(Italy) P Bertolucci | 5 | 6 | 7 | 3 | 6
(Australia) P McNamee | 6 | 6 | 6
(United States) M Grant | 3 | 4 | 1
(Sweden) P Hjertquist | 4 | 6 | 0
2 | (United States) J McEnroe | 6 | 7 | 6

Third round
13 | (Poland) W Fibak | 6 | 7 | 7
(Italy) P Bertolucci | 1 | 5 | 5
(Australia) P McNamee | 7 | 6 | 7 | 7
2 | (United States) J McEnroe | 6 | 7 | 6 | 6

Fourth round
13 | (Poland) W Fibak | 6 | 6 | 6 | 6
(Australia) P McNamee | 4 | 4 | 7 | 3

| Preceded by 1979 Australian Open | Grand Slam men's singles | Succeeded by 1980 Wimbledon Championships |
