= Jeff Etterbeek =

American tennis player

- Country (sports): United States
- Born: December 31, 1956 (age 69)
- Height: 6 ft 2 in (188 cm)
- Plays: Right-handed

Singles
- Career record: 0–1
- Highest ranking: No. 290 (Dec 26, 1979)

Doubles
- Career record: 0–2
- Highest ranking: No. 312 (Jan 3, 1979)

Grand Slam doubles results
- French Open: 1R (1980)

Jeff Etterbeek (born December 31, 1956) is an American former professional tennis player.

Etterbeek grew up in Holland, Michigan and finished his schooling at Cranbrook. He was an All-American collegiate tennis player for the University of Michigan, winning the Big 10 singles championship in 1978.

In 1980 he featured in the men's doubles main draw of the French Open.
