= Michael Grant (tennis) =

American tennis player

- Country (sports): United States
- Born: February 3, 1956 (age 70)
- Plays: Right-handed

Singles
- Career record: 15–31
- Highest ranking: No. 96 (December 26, 1979)

Grand Slam singles results
- French Open: 2R (1980)
- US Open: 2R (1980)

Doubles
- Career record: 9–21

Grand Slam doubles results
- French Open: 2R (1980)
- US Open: 1R (1979, 1980)

Michael Grant (born February 3, 1956) is an American former professional tennis player.

A right-handed player from Long Island, New York, Grant was ranked in the world's top 100 during his professional career. Competing on the Grand Prix circuit, he had best career wins over José Luis Clerc in Tokyo in 1979 and Brian Teacher in San Juan the following year. He was a quarter-finalist at a tournament Sarasota in 1980.

Grant made two appearances in the singles main draw of a grand slam tournament. He debuted at the 1980 French Open and had a first round win over Chris Delaney. At the 1980 US Open he also made the second round, by beating Ricardo Ycaza, before he lost a five-set second round match to Thierry Tulasne.
