= 1980 French Open – Women's doubles =

Tennis tournament

Women's doubles
- 1980 French Open

Final
- Champion: (United States) Kathy Jordan (United States) Anne Smith
- Runner-up: (Argentina) Ivanna Madruga (Argentina) Adriana Villagrán
- Score: 6–1, 6–0

Details
- Draw: 32
- Seeds: 8

Events
Singles	men	women		boys	girls
Doubles	men	women	mixed	boys	girls
WC Singles	men	women	quad
WC Doubles	men	women	quad
Legends	−45	45+	women
← 1979 ·	French Open	· 1981 →

The women's doubles tournament at the 1980 French Open was held from 26 May to 8 June 1980 on the outdoor clay courts at the Stade Roland Garros in Paris, France. Kathy Jordan and Anne Smith won the title, defeating Ivanna Madruga and Adriana Villagrán in the final.

== Seeds ==
1. (United States) Billie Jean King / (South Africa) Ilana Kloss (first round)
2. (United States) Kathy Jordan / (United States) Anne Smith (champions)
3. (United States) Chris Evert / (Australia) Wendy Turnbull (quarterfinals)
4. (Socialist Federal Republic of Yugoslavia) Mima Jaušovec / (Netherlands) Betty Stöve (semifinals)
5. (Romania) Virginia Ruzici / (United Kingdom) Virginia Wade (quarterfinals)
6. (Czechoslovakia) Hana Mandlíková / (Czechoslovakia) Renáta Tomanová (semifinals)
7. (Argentina) Ivanna Madruga / (Argentina) Adriana Villagrán (final)
8. (United States) Andrea Jaeger / (United States) Betsy Nagelsen (second round)

== Draw ==
=== Key ===
- Q = Qualifier
- WC = Wild card
- LL = Lucky loser
- Alt = Alternate
- SE = Special exempt
- PR = Protected ranking
- ITF = ITF entry
- JE = Junior exempt
- w/o = Walkover
- r = Retired
- d = Defaulted
- SR = Special ranking

=== Finals ===
Semifinals
7	(Argentina) Ivanna Madruga (Argentina) Adriana Villagrán	7	3	6
6	(Czechoslovakia) Hana Mandlíková (Czechoslovakia) Renáta Tomanová	6	6	2
4	(Socialist Federal Republic of Yugoslavia) Mima Jaušovec (Netherlands) Betty Stöve	6	4	6
2	(United States) Kathy Jordan (United States) Anne Smith	2	6	8

Final
7	(Argentina) Ivanna Madruga (Argentina) Adriana Villagrán	1	0
2	(United States) Kathy Jordan (United States) Anne Smith	6	6

=== Top half ===
First round
1	(United States) BJ King (South Africa) I Kloss	6	6	4
(United States) C Reynolds (United States) P Smith	7	3	6
(Italy) D Porzio (France) F Thibault	4	7	6
(Czechoslovakia) Y Brzáková (Czechoslovakia) I Budařová	6	5	4
(United States) L duPont (United States) R McCallum	2	6	6
(United States) J Harrington (South Korea) Lee D-h	6	3	2
(New Zealand) C Newton (Australia) J Walker	3	5
7	(Argentina) I Madruga (Argentina) A Villagran	6	7
3	(United States) C Evert-Lloyd (Australia) W Turnbull	6	7
(West Germany) B Bunge (West Germany) C Kohde-Kilsch	2	5
(United States) J DuVall (South Africa) Y Vermaak	6	5	6
(Romania) L Romanov (Romania) M Romanov	1	7	4
(United States) K Latham (United States) S Margolin	6	4	7
(United States) K Sands (United States) C Stoll	4	6	5
(France) F Dürr (France) G Lovera	0	3
6	(Czechoslovakia) H Mandlíková (Czechoslovakia) R Tomanová	6	6

Second round
(United States) C Reynolds (United States) P Smith	6	4	6
(Italy) D Porzio (France) F Thibault	4	6	4
(United States) L duPont (United States) R McCallum	3	6	2
7	(Argentina) I Madruga (Argentina) A Villagran	6	3	6
3	(United States) C Evert-Lloyd (Australia) W Turnbull	6	6
(United States) J DuVall (South Africa) Y Vermaak	4	4
(United States) K Latham (United States) S Margolin	0	0
6	(Czechoslovakia) H Mandlíková (Czechoslovakia) R Tomanová	6	6

Quarterfinals
(United States) C Reynolds (United States) P Smith	6	3	3
7	(Argentina) I Madruga (Argentina) A Villagran	4	6	6
(United States) C Evert-Lloyd (Australia) W Turnbull	2	7	4
6	(Czechoslovakia) H Mandlíková (Czechoslovakia) R Tomanová	6	5	6

Semifinals
7	(Argentina) I Madruga (Argentina) A Villagran	7	3	6
6	(Czechoslovakia) H Mandlíková (Czechoslovakia) R Tomanová	6	6	2

=== Bottom half ===
First round
8	(United States) A Jaeger (United States) B Nagelsen	6	6
(United States) R Blount (United States) M Redondo	2	4
(Canada) M Blackwood (Australia) P Whytcross	4	6	6
(United States) D Gilbert (United States) K Horvath	6	1	2
(United States) K Jones (West Germany) I Riedel	7	6
(United States) B Norton (Switzerland) H Strachoňová	5	3
(Brazil) M Bueno (France) R Darmon	1	0
4	(Socialist Federal Republic of Yugoslavia) M Jaušovec (Netherlands) B Stöve	6	6
5	(Romania) V Ruzici (United Kingdom) V Wade	7	6
(United Kingdom) G Coles (United Kingdom) A Hobbs	5	2
(Switzerland) P Delhees (Switzerland) C Jolissaint	6	6
(Japan) N Sato (Chile) S Urroz	4	3
(United States) L Forood (United States) B Jordan	6	6
(United Kingdom) J Durie (Italy) S Simmonds	3	2
(South Africa) L Allen (United States) R Fairbank	1	4
2	(United States) K Jordan (United States) A Smith	6	6

Second round
8	(United States) A Jaeger (United States) B Nagelsen	0	3
(Canada) M Blackwood (Australia) P Whytcross	6	6
(United States) K Jones (West Germany) I Riedel	3	6
4	(Socialist Federal Republic of Yugoslavia) M Jaušovec (Netherlands) B Stöve	6	7
5	(Romania) V Ruzici (United Kingdom) V Wade	6	6
(Switzerland) P Delhees (Switzerland) C Jolissaint	4	2
(United States) L Forood (United States) B Jordan	3	3
2	(United States) K Jordan (United States) A Smith	6	6

Quarterfinals
(Canada) M Blackwood (Australia) P Whytcross	5	4
4	(Socialist Federal Republic of Yugoslavia) M Jaušovec (Netherlands) B Stöve	7	6
5	(Romania) V Ruzici (United Kingdom) V Wade	1	6	1
2	(United States) K Jordan (United States) A Smith	6	3	6

Semifinals
4	(Socialist Federal Republic of Yugoslavia) M Jaušovec (Netherlands) B Stöve	6	4	6
2	(United States) K Jordan (United States) A Smith	2	6	8
