= Tim Garcia =

American tennis player

- Full name: Timothy L. Garcia
- Country (sports): United States
- Born: December 28, 1955 (age 69) Albuquerque, New Mexico
- Plays: Left-handed

Singles
- Career record: 3–21

Grand Slam singles results
- US Open: 1R (1978, 1979, 1980)

Doubles
- Highest ranking: 10–31

Grand Slam doubles results
- French Open: 2R (1980)
- US Open: 2R (1980)

Timothy Garcia (born December 28, 1955) is a former professional tennis player from the United States.

== Biography ==
Garcia grew up in Albuquerque and began playing tennis competitively at the age of 15.

While attending the University of New Mexico, Garcia played college tennis for the Lobos and earned All-American honors in 1976, when he was a semi-finalist in the NCAA singles championships. In 1978 he lost to John McEnroe in the NCAA championships, with the Stanford player coming close to defaulting the match due to his behaviour, instead going on to win the title.

From 1978 he competed on the professional tour for three years. He made three singles main draw appearances at the US Open and played doubles at the 1980 French Open.

Following his tennis career, Garcia studied at the University of New Mexico School of Law and became an attorney. In 2008 he was appointed by Governor Bill Richardson to serve as a judge on the New Mexico Court of Appeals, where he remained until his retirement in 2018.

== Challenger titles ==
=== Doubles: (1) ===
Year	Tournament	Surface	Partner	Opponents	Score
1981	Barcelona, Spain	Clay	(United States) Bruce Nichols	(Italy) Gianni Marchetti (Italy) Enzo Vattuone	6–4, 6–4
