= Hana Strachoňová =

- Full name: Hana Strachoňová
- Country (sports): Czechoslovakia; Switzerland
- Born: 2 January 1961 (age 64); Brno, Czechoslovakia
- Height: 5 ft 5 in (165 cm)

Singles

Grand Slam singles results
- Australian Open: 1R (1980)
- French Open: 3R (1978, 1980)
- Wimbledon: 3R (1979)
- US Open: 2R (1978)

Doubles

Grand Slam doubles results
- Australian Open: 1R (1980)
- French Open: 2R (1981, 1982)
- Wimbledon: 1R (1978, 1979, 1981)
- US Open: 2R (1980)

Hana Strachoňová (born 2 January 1961) is a retired professional tennis player who represented both Czechoslovakia and Switzerland.

== Biography ==
Born in Brno, Strachoňová competed originally for her native Czechoslovakia.

As a 17-year old in 1978 she played in two Fed Cup ties for Czechoslovakia's national team against Portugal and Indonesia. In both ties, she partnered with Hana Mandlíková in the doubles rubbers, and the pair won both matches. At the 1978 French Open, she had a win over ninth seed Renáta Tomanová to make the third round.

Strachoňová reached the third round of the 1979 Wimbledon Championships. Soon after her appearance at Wimbledon, she defected to Switzerland, and in November, it was announced that she had been granted political asylum. She already had been based out of Zurich.

She returned to the WTA Tour in February 1980 under the Swiss flag. Highlights that year included making the quarterfinals at Kitzbühel and Amsterdam as well as at the U.S. Clay Court Championships in Indianapolis, where she upset third seed Virginia Ruzici. Her best performance in a Grand Slam tournament after defecting was a third round appearance at the 1980 French Open, which was the first time someone who entered the draw as a lucky loser had reached that stage at Roland Garros.

In 1981, she defeated Dianne Fromholtz en route to the quarterfinals at Indianapolis, and she was a quarterfinalist at Lugano.

She retired from professional tennis after the 1984 US Open.
