= 1980 French Open – Women's singles =

Women's singles
- 1980 French Open

Final
- Champion: (United States) Chris Evert
- Runner-up: (Romania) Virginia Ruzici
- Score: 6–0, 6–3

Details
- Draw: 64
- Seeds: 16

Events
Singles	men	women		boys	girls
Doubles	men	women	mixed	boys	girls
WC Singles	men	women	quad
WC Doubles	men	women	quad
Legends	−45	45+	women
- French Open

Defending champion Chris Evert defeated Virginia Ruzici in the final, 6–0, 6–3 to win the women's singles tennis title at the 1980 French Open. It was her fourth French Open singles title and her tenth major singles title overall.

== Seeds ==
The seeded players are listed below. Chris Evert is the champion; others show the round in which they were eliminated.

1. (United States) Chris Evert (champion)
2. (United States) Billie Jean King (quarterfinals)
3. (Australia) Wendy Turnbull (quarterfinals)
4. (United Kingdom) Virginia Wade (third round)
5. (Australia) Dianne Fromholtz (semifinals)
6. (United States) Kathy Jordan (quarterfinals)
7. (Czechoslovakia) Hana Mandlíková (semifinals)
8. (Romania) Virginia Ruzici (finalist)
9. (Czechoslovakia) Regina Maršíková (withdrew before the tournament began)
10. (United Kingdom) Sue Barker (withdrew before the tournament began)
11. (United States) Andrea Jaeger (first round)
12. (West Germany) Sylvia Hanika (third round)
13. (United States) Caroline Stoll (second round)
14. (Socialist Federal Republic of Yugoslavia) Mima Jaušovec (third round)
15. (United States) Kate Latham (first round)
16. (West Germany) Bettina Bunge (third round)

== Draw ==
=== Key ===
- Q = Qualifier
- WC = Wild card
- LL = Lucky loser
- r = Retired

=== Finals ===
Quarterfinals
1	(United States) Chris Evert	6	6
6	(United States) Kathy Jordan	2	0
(Argentina) Ivanna Madruga	2	3
7	(Czechoslovakia) Hana Mandlíková	6	6
8	(Romania) Virginia Ruzici	6	6
3	(Australia) Wendy Turnbull	2	0
5	(Australia) Dianne Fromholtz	6	6
2	(United States) Billie Jean King	1	4

Semifinals
1	(United States) Chris Evert	6	6	6
7	(Czechoslovakia) Hana Mandlíková	7	2	2
8	(Romania) Virginia Ruzici	7	6
5	(Australia) Dianne Fromholtz	6	1

Finals
1	(United States) Chris Evert	6	6
8	(Romania) Virginia Ruzici	0	3

=== Earlier rounds ===
==== Section 1 ====
First round
1	(United States) Evert	6	6
Q	(France) Franch	0	0
(United States) Teeguarden	7	6
(France) Thibault	6	4
Q	(Netherlands) Schutte	6	6
Q	(Argentina) Casabianca	4	2
16	(West Germany) Bunge	6	6
(Italy) Simmonds	1	1
12	(West Germany) Hanika	6	6
(United States) Jordan	1	1
(Netherlands) Stöve	7	6
(United States) Forood	5	2
(United States) Horvath	6	6
(United States) Sands	2	3
6	(United States) Jordan	6	6
(South Africa) Vermaak	3	4

Second round
1	(United States) Evert	6	6
(United States) Teeguarden	1	1
Q	(Netherlands) Schutte	1	2
16	(West Germany) Bunge	6	6
12	(West Germany) Hanika	6	6
(Netherlands) Stöve	4	3
(United States) Horvath	1	2
6	(United States) Jordan	6	6

Third round
1	(United States) Evert	4	6	6
16	(West Germany) Bunge	6	4	3
12	(West Germany) Hanika	1	2
6	(United States) Jordan	6	6

Quarterfinals
1	(United States) Evert	6	6
6	(United States) Jordan	2	0

==== Section 2 ====
First round
4	(United Kingdom) Wade	6	6
(Czechoslovakia) Tomanová	3	2
(Czechoslovakia) Budařová	6	7
(United Kingdom) Coles	4	5
(Argentina) Madruga	6	6
(United States) duPont	1	0
13	(United States) Stoll	6	6
(Switzerland) Jolissaint	4	1
LL	(South Korea) Lee	6	7
(West Germany) Kohde-Kilsch	3	5
(Switzerland) Delhees	6	6
(United Kingdom) Durie	2	1
(South Africa) Fairbank	6	6
(Sweden) Sandin	4	1
7	(Czechoslovakia) Mandlíková	6	6
(United States) Redondo	3	4

Second round
4	(United Kingdom) Wade	6	6
(Czechoslovakia) Budařová	2	1
(Argentina) Madruga	6	6
13	(United States) Stoll	1	2
LL	(South Korea) Lee	1	1
(Switzerland) Delhees	6	6
(South Africa) Fairbank	1	2
7	(Czechoslovakia) Mandlíková	6	6

Third round
4	(United Kingdom) Wade	0	7	2
(Argentina) Madruga	6	6	6
(Switzerland) Delhees	1	2
7	(Czechoslovakia) Mandlíková	6	6

Quarterfinals
(Argentina) Madruga	2	3
7	(Czechoslovakia) Mandlíková	6	6

==== Section 3 ====
First round
8	(Romania) Ruzici	6	7
(South Africa) Kloss	4	5
Q	(Hungary) Pinterová	6	6
(United States) Harrington	4	2
Q	(Romania) Simionescu	6	6
(Sweden) Ekblom	3	4
14	(Socialist Federal Republic of Yugoslavia) Jaušovec	6	6
(France) Beillan	0	2
(United States) Smith	2	6	6
15	(United States) Latham	6	2	1
(France) Simon	6	3	6
(United States) Gerulaitis	2	6	4
(Sweden) Bohm	6	4	6
(United States) Nagelsen	4	6	4
3	(Australia) Turnbull	7	6
(France) Lovera	5	2

Second round
8	(Romania) Ruzici	6	6
Q	(Hungary) Pinterová	1	2
Q	(Romania) Simionescu	7	3	2
14	(Socialist Federal Republic of Yugoslavia) Jaušovec	6	6	6
(United States) Smith	6	7
(France) Simon	1	6
(Sweden) Bohm	5	6	7
3	(Australia) Turnbull	7	1	9

Third round
8	(Romania) Ruzici	7	6
14	(Socialist Federal Republic of Yugoslavia) Jaušovec	6	3
(United States) Smith	6	4	1
3	(Australia) Turnbull	3	6	6

Quarterfinals
8	(Romania) Ruzici	6	6
3	(Australia) Turnbull	2	0

==== Section 4 ====
First round
5	(Australia) Fromholtz	6	6
(Romania) Romanov	3	4
(United States) DuVall	0	6	6
(United States) Margolin	6	4	4
(West Germany) Riedel-Kühn	6	2	6
(United States) Gilbert	1	6	4
LL	(Switzerland) Strachoňová	6	6
11	(United States) Jaeger	2	4
(United States) Allen	1	6	6
LL	(Netherlands) Mesker	6	3	1
(United States) Smith	6	6
Q	(United States) Jones	1	2
(United Kingdom) Hobbs	6	6
Q	(Brazil) Medrado	4	1
2	(United States) King	6	6
(United States) McCallum	2	1

Second round
5	(Australia) Fromholtz	6	7
(United States) DuVall	2	5
(West Germany) Riedel-Kühn	6	3	2
LL	(Switzerland) Strachoňová	1	6	6
(United States) Allen	7	6
(United States) Smith	6	2
(United Kingdom) Hobbs	2	2
2	(United States) King	6	6

Third round
5	(Australia) Fromholtz	4	6	6
LL	(Switzerland) Strachoňová	6	4	3
(United States) Allen	4	6	2
2	(United States) King	6	3	6

Quarterfinals
5	(Australia) Fromholtz	6	6
2	(United States) King	1	4

Preceded by 1979 Australian Open – Women's singles	Grand Slam women's singles	Succeeded by 1980 Wimbledon Championships – Women's singles
