= 1979 Bordeaux Open =

- Date: 1–7 October
- Edition: 1st
- Category: Grand Prix
- Draw: 32S / 16D
- Prize money: $50,000
- Surface: Clay / outdoor
- Location: Bordeaux, France
- Venue: Villa Primrose

Champions

Singles
- (France) Yannick Noah

Doubles
- (France) Patrice Dominguez (France) Denis Naegelen
Bordeaux Open	· 1980 →

The 1979 Bordeaux Open also known as the Grand Prix Passing Shot was a men's tennis tournament played on outdoor clay courts at Villa Primrose in Bordeaux, France that was part of the 1979 Colgate-Palmolive Grand Prix. The tournament was held from 1 October until 7 October 1979. Singles matches were best of five sets and doubles best of three. Fourth-seeded Yannick Noah won the singles title.

== Finals ==
=== Singles ===
(France) Yannick Noah defeated (United States) Harold Solomon 6–0, 6–7, 6–1, 1–6, 6–4

- It was Noah's 3rd singles title of the year and the 5th of his career.

=== Doubles ===
(France) Patrice Dominguez / (France) Denis Naegelen defeated (France) Bernard Fritz / (Colombia) Iván Molina 6–4, 6–4
