= Glenn Petrovic =

American tennis player

- Country (sports): United States
- Born: March 3, 1957 (age 68)
- Plays: Right-handed

Singles
- Career record: 2–10
- Highest ranking: No. 199 (Dec 26, 1979)

Doubles
- Career record: 4–12

Grand Slam doubles results
- French Open: 2R (1980)
- US Open: 1R (1980, 1981)

Glenn Petrovic (born March 3, 1957) is an American former professional tennis player.

Raised in Pacific Palisades, California, Petrovic is the son of Vladimir Petrović, a Yugoslav Davis Cup player.

Petrovic played collegiate tennis for the USC Trojans and earned All-American honors in 1978, before embarking on the professional tour. In 1979 he won an ATP Challenger singles title in Huntington Beach and made the second round of the New South Wales Open, losing to Guillermo Vilas. He ended the year ranked in the world's top 200. His grand slam main draw appearances would all come in doubles, featuring at the French Open and US Open.

== ATP Challenger titles ==
=== Singles: (1) ===
No.	Date	Tournament	Surface	Opponents	Score
1.	Oct 1979	Huntington Beach Challenger, United States	Hard	(United States) Marcel Freeman	6–4, 6–2
