= Anne Smith (tennis) =

American tennis player

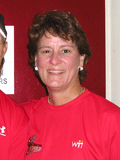
- Smith in 2007
- Country (sports): United States
- Born: July 1, 1959 (age 66) Dallas, Texas, U.S.
- Height: 5 ft 5 in (1.65 m)
- Turned pro: 1978
- Retired: 1991
- Plays: Right-handed (one-handed backhand)
- Prize money: US$1,163,494

Singles
- Career record: 203–175
- Career titles: 3
- Highest ranking: No. 11 (July 1, 1980)

Grand Slam singles results
- Australian Open: QF (1982)
- French Open: 4R (1981, 1982)
- Wimbledon: QF (1982)
- US Open: QF (1981)

Doubles
- Career record: 416–168
- Career titles: 38
- Highest ranking: No. 1 (1980 & 1981)

Grand Slam doubles results
- Australian Open: W (1981)
- French Open: W (1980, 1982)
- Wimbledon: W (1980)
- US Open: W (1981)

Mixed doubles
- Career titles: 5

Grand Slam mixed doubles results
- Australian Open: 1R (1991)
- French Open: W (1980, 1984)
- Wimbledon: W (1982)
- US Open: W (1981, 1982)

Anne Smith (born July 1, 1959) is an educational psychologist and a former professional tennis player from the United States.

Smith's highest women's doubles ranking was world No. 1 in 1980 and 1981. Her highest singles ranking was world No. 11 in 1980.

== Major finals ==
=== Grand Slam finals ===
==== Doubles: 9 (5–4) ====
Result	Year	Championship	Surface	Partner	Opponents	Score
Win	1980	French Open	Clay	(United States) Kathy Jordan	(Argentina) Ivanna Madruga (Argentina) Adriana Villagrán	6–1, 6–0
Win	1980	Wimbledon	Grass	(United States) Kathy Jordan	(United States) Rosemary Casals (Australia) Wendy Turnbull	4–6, 7–5, 6–1
Loss	1981	Wimbledon	Grass	(United States) Kathy Jordan	(United States) Martina Navratilova (United States) Pam Shriver	6–3, 7–6^{(8–6)}
Win	1981	US Open	Hard	(United States) Kathy Jordan	(United States) Rosemary Casals (Australia) Wendy Turnbull	6–3, 6–3
Win	1981	Australian Open	Grass	(United States) Kathy Jordan	(United States) Martina Navratilova (United States) Pam Shriver	6–2, 7–5
Win	1982	French Open	Clay	(United States) Martina Navratilova	(United States) Rosemary Casals (Australia) Wendy Turnbull	6–3, 6–4
Loss	1982	Wimbledon	Grass	(United States) Kathy Jordan	(United States) Martina Navratilova (United States) Pam Shriver	6–4, 6–1
Loss	1983	French Open	Clay	(United States) Kathy Jordan	(South Africa) Rosalyn Fairbank (United States) Candy Reynolds	5–7, 7–5, 6–2
Loss	1984	Wimbledon	Grass	(United States) Kathy Jordan	(United States) Martina Navratilova (United States) Pam Shriver	6–3, 6–4

==== Mixed doubles: 5 (5–0) ====
Result	Year	Championship	Surface	Partner	Opponents	Score
Win	1980	French Open	Clay	(United States) Billy Martin	(Czechoslovakia) Stanislav Birner (Czechoslovakia) Renáta Tomanová	2–6, 6–4, 8–6
Win	1981	US Open	Hard	(South Africa) Kevin Curren	(United States) Steve Denton (United States) JoAnne Russell	6–4, 7–6^{(7–4)}
Win	1982	Wimbledon	Grass	(South Africa) Kevin Curren	(United Kingdom) John Lloyd (Australia) Wendy Turnbull	2–6, 6–3, 7–5
Win	1982	US Open	Hard	(South Africa) Kevin Curren	(United States) Barbara Potter (United States) Ferdi Taygan	6–7, 7–6^{(7–4)}, 7–6^{(7–5)}
Win	1984	French Open	Clay	(United States) Dick Stockton	(Australia) Anne Minter (Australia) Laurie Warder	6–2, 6–4

=== Year-End Championships finals ===
==== Doubles: 1 (0–1) ====
Result	Year	Championship	Surface	Partner	Opponents	Score
Loss	1982	New York City	Carpet	(United States) Kathy Jordan	(United States) Martina Navratilova (United States) Pam Shriver	6–4, 6–3

== WTA Tour finals ==
=== Singles 4 (0–4) ===
Legend
Grand Slam tournaments (0/0)
WTA Championships (0/0)
Virginia Slims (0/2)
Tier I (0/0)
Tier II (0/0)
Tier III (0/1)
Tier IV & V (0/1)

Result	W/L	Date	Tournament	Surface	Opponent	Score
Loss	0–1	Jan 1982	Washington, D.C., US	Carpet	(United States) Martina Navratilova	2–6, 3–6
Loss	0–2	Nov 1987	Indianapolis, US	Hard (i)	(United States) Halle Cioffi	6–4, 4–6, 6–7^{(10–12)}
Loss	0–3	Oct 1988	New Orleans, US	Hard	(United States) Chris Evert	4–6, 1–6
Loss	0–4	Feb 1991	Oklahoma City, US	Hard (i)	(Czechoslovakia) Jana Novotná	6–3, 3–6, 2–6

=== Doubles 69 (32–37) ===
Legend
Grand Slam tournaments (5/4)
WTA Championships (0/1)
Virginia Slims (23/31)
Tier I (1/0)
Tier II (1/0)
Tier III (0/1)
Tier IV & V (2/0)

Result	No.	Date	Tournament	Surface	Partner	Opponents	Score
Win	1.	Mar 1978	Dallas	Carpet	(United States) Martina Navratilova	(Australia) Evonne Goolagong (Netherlands) Betty Stöve	6–3, 7–6
Loss	1.	Oct 1978	Atlanta	Carpet	(United States) Martina Navratilova	(France) Françoise Dürr (United Kingdom) Virginia Wade	6–4, 2–6, 4–6
Loss	2.	Oct 1978	Phoenix	Hard	(United States) Martina Navratilova	(United States) Tracy Austin (Netherlands) Betty Stöve	4–6, 7–6, 2–6
Win	2.	Nov 1978	Oldsmar	Hard	(United States) Martina Navratilova	(Australia) Kerry Reid (Australia) Wendy Turnbull	7–6, 6–3
Loss	3.	Feb 1979	Los Angeles	Hard (i)	(United States) Martina Navratilova	(United States) Rosemary Casals (United States) Chris Evert	4–6, 6–1, 3–6
Win	3.	Mar 1979	Dallas	Carpet	(United States) Martina Navratilova	(United States) Rosemary Casals (United States) Chris Evert	7–6, 6–2
Win	4.	Aug 1979	Indianapolis	Clay	(United States) Kathy Jordan	(United States) Penny Johnson (United States) Paula Smith	6–1, 6–0
Loss	4.	Sep 1979	Atlanta	Carpet	(United States) Ann Kiyomura	(Netherlands) Betty Stöve (Australia) Wendy Turnbull	2–6, 4–6
Win	5.	Oct 1979	Tampa	Hard	(Romania) Virginia Ruzici	(South Africa) Ilana Kloss (United States) Betty-Ann Stuart	7–5, 4–6, 7–5
Win	6.	Nov 1979	Brighton	Carpet	(United States) Ann Kiyomura	(South Africa) Ilana Kloss (United States) Laura duPont	6–2, 6–1
Loss	5.	Dec 1979	Melbourne	Grass	(Australia) Dianne Fromholtz	(United States) Billie Jean King (Australia) Wendy Turnbull	3–6, 3–6
Loss	6.	Feb 1980	Los Angeles	Hard (i)	(United States) Kathy Jordan	(United States) Rosemary Casals (United States) Martina Navratilova	6–7, 2–6
Loss	7.	Feb 1980	Detroit	Carpet	(United States) Kathy Jordan	(United States) Billie Jean King (South Africa) Ilana Kloss	6–3, 3–6, 2–6
Win	7.	Apr 1980	Hilton Head	Clay	(United States) Kathy Jordan	(United States) Candy Reynolds (United States) Paula Smith	6–2, 6–1
Win	8.	Jun 1980	French Open	Clay	(United States) Kathy Jordan	(Argentina) Ivanna Madruga (Argentina) Adriana Villagrán	6–1, 6–0
Win	9.	Jun 1980	Eastbourne	Grass	(United States) Kathy Jordan	(United States) Pam Shriver (Netherlands) Betty Stöve	6–4, 6–1
Win	10.	Jul 1980	Wimbledon	Grass	(United States) Kathy Jordan	(United States) Rosemary Casals (Australia) Wendy Turnbull	4–6, 7–5, 6–1
Win	11.	Jul 1980	Montreal	Hard	(United States) Pam Shriver	(United States) Ann Kiyomura (South Africa) Greer Stevens	3–6, 6–6 ret.
Loss	8.	Jul 1980	Richmond	Carpet	(United States) Pam Shriver	(United States) Billie Jean King (United States) Martina Navratilova	4–6, 6–4, 3–6
Win	12.	Aug 1980	Indianapolis	Clay	(United States) Paula Smith	(Romania) Virginia Ruzici (Czechoslovakia) Renáta Tomanová	4–6, 6–3, 6–4
Win	13.	Sep 1980	Las Vegas	Hard (i)	(United States) Kathy Jordan	(United States) Martina Navratilova (Netherlands) Betty Stöve	2–6, 6–4, 6–3
Loss	9.	Sep 1980	Atlanta	Carpet	(United States) Kathy Jordan	(United States) Barbara Potter (United States) Sharon Walsh	3–6, 1–6
Loss	10.	Oct 1980	Minneapolis	Carpet	(United States) Paula Smith	(United States) Ann Kiyomura (United States) Candy Reynolds	3–6, 6–4, 1–6
Win	14.	Oct 1980	Brighton	Carpet	(United States) Kathy Jordan	(United States) Martina Navratilova (Netherlands) Betty Stöve	6–3, 7–5
Loss	11.	Nov 1980	Filderstadt	Hard (i)	(United States) Kathy Jordan	(Czechoslovakia) Hana Mandlíková (Netherlands) Betty Stöve	4–6, 5–7
Loss	12.	Nov 1980	Tampa	Hard	(United States) Paula Smith	(United States) Rosemary Casals (United States) Candy Reynolds	6–7, 5–7
Win	15.	Jan 1981	Cincinnati	Carpet	(United States) Kathy Jordan	(United States) Martina Navratilova (United States) Pam Shriver	1–6, 6–3, 6–3
Loss	13.	Mar 1981	Dallas	Carpet	(United States) Kathy Jordan	(United States) Martina Navratilova (United States) Pam Shriver	5–7, 4–6
Loss	14.	Jun 1981	Eastbourne	Grass	(United States) Kathy Jordan	(United States) Martina Navratilova (United States) Pam Shriver	7–6, 2–6, 1–6
Loss	15.	Jul 1981	Wimbledon	Grass	(United States) Kathy Jordan	(United States) Martina Navratilova (United States) Pam Shriver	3–6, 6–7^{(6–8)}
Loss	16.	Aug 1981	Richmond	Carpet	(United States) Kathy Jordan	(United Kingdom) Sue Barker (United States) Ann Kiyomura	6–4, 6–7, 4–6
Loss	17.	Aug 1981	Toronto	Hard	(United States) Candy Reynolds	(United States) Martina Navratilova (United States) Pam Shriver	6–7, 6–7
Win	16.	Sep 1981	US Open	Hard	(United States) Kathy Jordan	(United States) Rosemary Casals (Australia) Wendy Turnbull	6–3, 6–3
Win	17.	Oct 1981	Brighton	Carpet	(United States) Barbara Potter	(Socialist Federal Republic of Yugoslavia) Mima Jaušovec (United States) Pam Shriver	6–7, 6–3, 6–4
Loss	18.	Nov 1981	Filderstadt	Hard (i)	(United States) Barbara Potter	(Socialist Federal Republic of Yugoslavia) Mima Jaušovec (United States) Martina Navratilova	4–6, 1–6
Loss	19.	Nov 1981	Sydney	Grass	(United States) Kathy Jordan	(United States) Martina Navratilova (United States) Pam Shriver	7–6, 2–6, 4–6
Win	18.	Dec 1981	Australian Open	Grass	(United States) Kathy Jordan	(United States) Martina Navratilova (United States) Pam Shriver	6–2, 7–5
Win	19.	Jan 1982	Washington, D.C.	Carpet	(United States) Kathy Jordan	(United States) Martina Navratilova (United States) Pam Shriver	6–2, 3–6, 6–1
Loss	20.	Jan 1982	Cincinnati	Carpet	(United States) Pam Shriver	(United Kingdom) Sue Barker (United States) Ann Kiyomura	2–6, 6–7
Loss	21.	Jan 1982	Seattle	Carpet	(United States) Kathy Jordan	(United States) Rosemary Casals (Australia) Wendy Turnbull	5–7, 4–6
Loss	22.	Feb 1982	Kansas City	Carpet	(United States) Mary-Lou Piatek	(United States) Barbara Potter (United States) Sharon Walsh	6–4, 2–6, 2–6
Win	20.	Mar 1982	Los Angeles	Carpet	(United States) Kathy Jordan	(United States) Barbara Potter (United States) Sharon Walsh	6–3, 7–5
Win	21.	Mar 1982	Boston	Carpet	(United States) Kathy Jordan	(United States) Rosemary Casals (Australia) Wendy Turnbull	7–6, 2–6, 6–4
Loss	23.	Mar 1982	New York City	Carpet	(United States) Kathy Jordan	(United States) Martina Navratilova (United States) Pam Shriver	4–6, 3–6
Loss	24.	Apr 1982	Fort Worth	Clay	(United States) Kathy Jordan	(United States) Martina Navratilova (United States) Pam Shriver	5–7, 3–6
Loss	25.	May 1982	Orlando	Clay	(United States) Kathy Jordan	(United States) Rosemary Casals (Australia) Wendy Turnbull	3–6, 3–6
Win	22.	Jun 1982	French Open	Clay	(United States) Martina Navratilova	(United States) Rosemary Casals (Australia) Wendy Turnbull	6–3, 6–4
Loss	26.	Jun 1982	Eastbourne	Grass	(United States) Kathy Jordan	(United States) Martina Navratilova (United States) Pam Shriver	3–6, 4–6
Loss	27.	Jul 1982	Wimbledon	Grass	(United States) Kathy Jordan	(United States) Martina Navratilova (United States) Pam Shriver	4–6, 1–6
Loss	28.	Oct 1982	Filderstadt	Hard (i)	(United States) Candy Reynolds	(United States) Martina Navratilova (United States) Pam Shriver	2–6, 3–6
Win	23.	Nov 1982	Brisbane	Grass	(United States) Billie Jean King	(West Germany) Claudia Kohde-Kilsch (West Germany) Eva Pfaff	6–3, 6–4
Loss	29.	Jan 1983	Washington, D.C.	Carpet	(United States) Kathy Jordan	(United States) Martina Navratilova (United States) Pam Shriver	6–4, 5–7, 3–6
Loss	30.	Feb 1983	Chicago	Carpet	(United States) Kathy Jordan	(United States) Martina Navratilova (United States) Pam Shriver	1–6, 2–6
Loss	31.	Mar 1983	Boston	Carpet	(United States) Kathy Jordan	(United Kingdom) Jo Durie (United States) Ann Kiyomura	3–6, 1–6
Loss	32.	Apr 1983	Tokyo	Carpet	(United States) Kathy Jordan	(United States) Billie Jean King (United States) Sharon Walsh	1–6, 1–6
Win	24.	Apr 1983	Orlando	Clay	(United States) Billie Jean King	(United States) Martina Navratilova (United States) Pam Shriver	6–3, 1–6, 7–6
Loss	33.	Jun 1983	French Open	Clay	(United States) Kathy Jordan	(South Africa) Rosalyn Fairbank (United States) Candy Reynolds	7–5, 5–7, 2–6
Win	25.	Apr 1984	Amelia Island	Clay	(United States) Kathy Jordan	(United Kingdom) Anne Hobbs (Socialist Federal Republic of Yugoslavia) Mima Jaušovec	6–4, 3–6, 6–4
Loss	34.	Jul 1984	Wimbledon	Grass	(United States) Kathy Jordan	(United States) Martina Navratilova (United States) Pam Shriver	3–6, 4–6
Win	26.	Mar 1985	Palm Beach Gardens	Clay	(United States) JoAnne Russell	(Peru) Laura Arraya (Argentina) Gabriela Sabatini	1–6, 6–1, 7–6^{(7–4)}
Loss	35.	Jan 1986	Wichita	Carpet	(United States) JoAnne Russell	(United States) Kathy Jordan (United States) Candy Reynolds	3–6, 7–6^{(7–5)}, 3–6
Win	27.	Mar 1986	Hershey	Carpet	(United States) Candy Reynolds	(United States) Sandy Collins (United States) Kim Sands	7–6^{(10–8)}, 6–1
Win	28.	Oct 1986	New Orleans	Carpet	(United States) Candy Reynolds	(Soviet Union) Svetlana Parkhomenko (Soviet Union) Larisa Savchenko	6–3, 3–6, 6–3
Loss	36.	Nov 1986	Indianapolis	Hard (i)	(United States) Candy Reynolds	(United States) Zina Garrison (United States) Lori McNeil	5–4 ret.
Win	29.	Feb 1990	Chicago	Carpet	(United States) Martina Navratilova	(Spain) Arantxa Sánchez Vicario (France) Nathalie Tauziat	6–7^{(9–11)}, 6–4, 6–3
Loss	37.	Jul 1990	Newport	Grass	(United States) Patty Fendick	(South Africa) Lise Gregory (United States) Gretchen Magers	6–7^{(7–9)}, 1–6
Win	30.	Aug 1990	Albuquerque	Hard	(United States) Meredith McGrath	(United States) Mareen Louie-Harper (United States) Wendy White	7–6^{(7–2)}, 6–4
Win	31.	Nov 1990	Oakland	Carpet	(United States) Meredith McGrath	(South Africa) Rosalyn Fairbank (United States) Robin White	2–6, 6–0, 6–4
Win	32.	Feb 1991	Oklahoma City	Hard (i)	(United States) Meredith McGrath	(United States) Katrina Adams (Canada) Jill Hetherington	6–2, 6–4

== Grand Slam performance timeline ==
Key
W	F	SF	QF	#R	RR	Q#	DNQ	A	NH

(W) winner; (F) finalist; (SF) semifinalist; (QF) quarterfinalist; (#R) rounds 4, 3, 2, 1; (RR) round-robin stage; (Q#) qualification round; (DNQ) did not qualify; (A) absent; (NH) not held; (SR) strike rate (events won / competed); (W–L) win–loss record.

=== Singles ===
Tournament	1977		1978	1979	1980	1981	1982	1983	1984	1985	1986	1987	1988	1989	1990	1991	W–L
Grand Slam tournaments
Australian Open	A	A	A	A	A	1R	QF	A	A	A	NH	3R	A	A	A	2R	6–4
French Open	A		A	3R	3R	4R	4R	1R	A	1R	3R	A	A	A	A	A	11–7
Wimbledon	2R		A	2R	2R	2R	QF	A	A	4R	1R	2R	A	A	2R	A	10–9
US Open	2R		4R	4R	1R	QF	A	A	A	A	1R	A	1R	2R	A	2R	13–9

=== Doubles ===
Tournament	1976	1977		1978	1979	1980	1981	1982	1983	1984	1985	1986	1987	1988	1989	1990	1991	W–L
Grand Slam tournaments
Australian Open	A	A	A	A	A	A	W	SF	A	A	A	NH	A	A	A	A	SF	12–2
French Open	A	A		A	QF	W	QF	W	F	QF	3R	QF	A	A	A	A	A	28–6
Wimbledon	A	1R		A	3R	W	F	F	A	F	1R	3R	QF	A	A	3R	A	26–9
US Open	2R	3R		2R	2R	SF	W	QF	A	A	2R	3R	A	3R	1R	A	3R	25–11

=== Mixed doubles ===
Tournament	1978	1979	1980	1981	1982	1983	1984	1985	1986	1987	1988	1989	1990	1991	W–L
Grand Slam tournaments
Australian Open	NH	NH	NH	NH	NH	NH	NH	NH	NH	A	A	A	A	1R	0–1
French Open	A	QF	W	QF	A	A	W	3R	A	A	A	A	A	A	13–3
Wimbledon	A	A	2R	1R	W	A	3R	3R	A	1R	A	A	A	A	8–5
US Open	SF	QF	SF	W	W	A	A	A	1R	A	2R	2R	A	1R	20–7

Note: The Australian Open was held twice in 1977, in January and December.

== Education ==
She received a Bachelor of Arts in psychology from Trinity University and a PhD. in educational psychology from The University of Texas.

== Career ==
Smith is a licensed psychologist in Texas and Massachusetts. She was director of the Learning Center at Dean College in Franklin, Massachusetts. She was the coach of the WTT Boston Lobsters team in 2005, 2006, and 2007.

Smith is the author of Grand Slam: Coach Your Mind to Win in Sports, Business & Life, with a foreword by Billie Jean King, and The MACH 4 Mental Training System: A Handbook for Athletes, Coaches and Parents.

On August 22, 2012, Smith appeared in an episode of Storage Wars: Texas where she appraised the value of a tennis racket restringing machine that had been won in an auction of a storage unit.

== Honors and awards ==
- Mary Lowdon Award (Texas) -1974–1977
- Maureen Connolly Brinker Sportsmanship Award (Memphis, Tennessee) -1976
- Most Promising Player award by Seventeen – 1976
- Winner Seventeen Magazine Tournament of Champions – 1977
- Winner Maureen Connolly Brinker Outstanding Junior Girl Award (Philadelphia) -1977
- Enshrined into the Texas Sports Hall of Fame in 1993
- Mental Training Coach for Harvard University Women's Tennis Team – 2005–2006
- Inducted into the Trinity University Athletics Hall of Fame in 1999
- 35-and-Over Wimbledon Doubles Champion in 1996 & 1997
- Appointed Member of the United States Tennis Association (USTA) Sport Science Committee 2001, 2002,2018,2019
- Coach of the WTT Boston Lobsters – 2005, 2006, 2007
- Received the International Tennis Hall of Fame Educational award - 2017
