= 1979 New South Wales Open =

- Date: 17–23 December 1979
- Edition: 87th
- Category: Grand Prix (M); Colgate Series (W)
- Draw: 64S/32D (M); 32S/16D (W)
- Prize money: $100,000 (M) $50,000 (W)
- Surface: Grass / outdoor
- Location: Sydney, Australia
- Venue: White City Stadium

Champions

Men's singles
- (Australia) Phil Dent

Women's singles
- (Czechoslovakia) Hana Mandlíková

Men's doubles
- (Australia) Peter McNamara / (Australia) Paul McNamee

Women's doubles
- (United States) Diane Desfor / (United States) Barbara Hallquist
- New South Wales Open

The 1979 New South Wales Open, also known by its sponsored name Nabisco New South Wales Open, was a combined men's and women's tennis tournament played on outdoor grass courts at the White City Stadium in Sydney. The men's event was part of the 1979 Colgate-Palmolive Grand Prix circuit while the women's event was part of the 1979 Colgate Series. It was the 87th edition of the event and was held from 17 December through 23 December 1979. The singles titles were won by 14th-seeded Phil Dent and third-seeded Hana Mandlíková.

== Finals ==
=== Men's singles ===
(Australia) Phil Dent defeated (United States) Hank Pfister 6–4, 6–4, 7–5

=== Women's singles ===
(Czechoslovakia) Hana Mandlíková defeated (West Germany) Bettina Bunge 6–3, 3–6, 6–3

=== Men's doubles ===
(Australia) Peter McNamara / (Australia) Paul McNamee defeated (Australia) Steve Docherty / (United States) Christopher Lewis 7–6, 6–3

=== Women's doubles ===
(United States) Diane Desfor / (United States) Barbara Hallquist defeated (United States) Barbara Jordan / (Australia) Kym Ruddell 4–6, 6–2, 6–2
