= Denis Naegelen =

French tennis player

- Country (sports): France
- Born: 14 March 1952 (age 74) Strasbourg region,
- Plays: Right-handed

Singles
- Career record: 20–29
- Career titles: 0
- Highest ranking: No. 131 (14 June 1976)

Grand Slam singles results
- Australian Open: 2R (1973)
- French Open: 3R (1980)

Doubles
- Career record: 23–33
- Career titles: 1

Grand Slam doubles results
- Australian Open: 2R (1973)
- French Open: 3R (1975)

Denis Naegelen (born 14 March 1952) is a French former professional tennis player. Active on the international circuit during the 1970s and early 1980s, Naegelen achieved a career-high singles ranking of world No. 131 in June 1976 and reached a doubles ranking of world No. 131 in 1980.> As a singles competitor, his best Grand Slam performance was at the 1980 French Open, where he advanced to the third round.

== Tennis career ==
Naegelen competed in the French Open every year from 1973 to 1983, with the exception of 1979.

He also took part in the 1973 Australian Open, and made the second round of both the singles and doubles.

In 1976, Naegelen was a quarter-finalist at a Grand Prix tournament in Madrid.

Also in 1976, Naegelen competed in the main draws in both singles and doubles at the 1976 French Open, where he faced American Steve Turner in both draws. He defeated Turner in singles in the first round in straight sets, before losing to Argentine Guillermo Vilas in the second round in straight sets. In doubles, however, he teamed up with fellow Frenchman Patrice Barthès, and they lost to Turner and his fellow American Steve Krulevitz in straight sets in the first round.

Naegelen and Patrice Dominguez were doubles champions at the 1979 Bordeaux Open.

He had his best singles performance at the 1980 French Open, where Naegelen beat Jiří Hřebec and Terry Rocavert. In third round he wasted a two-set lead to lose to American Ferdi Taygan, 9–11 in the fifth set.

== Grand Prix career finals ==
=== Doubles: 1 (1–0) ===
| Result | W/L | Date | Tournament | Surface | Partner | Opponents | Score |
|---|---|---|---|---|---|---|---|
| Win | 1–0 | Oct 1979 | Bordeaux, France | Clay | (France) Patrice Dominguez | (France) Bernard Fritz (Colombia) Iván Molina | 6–4, 6–4 |

== Management, hospitality, and event production ==
Following his retirement from professional tennis, Naegelen transitioned into athletic management, corporate hospitality, and event production. In 1987, he founded Quarterback, a sports marketing agency that manages corporate hospitality for global events, including Roland Garros and the Paris Masters. Naegelen is also the owner and long-serving tournament director of the Internationaux de Strasbourg, a WTA Tour clay-court event, which he acquired and expanded. Additionally, he expanded into multi-sport promotion by creating the Masters de Pétanque championship series in 1999.

== See also ==
- Internationaux de Strasbourg – Long-running WTA tournament directed and executive-produced by Naegelen.
