= Adriana Villagrán =

Argentine tennis player

- Full name: Adriana Villagrán-Reami
- Country (sports): Argentina
- Born: 7 August 1956 (age 69)
- Turned pro: 1979
- Retired: 1991
- Prize money: $213,421

Singles
- Career record: 76–118
- Career titles: 0
- Highest ranking: No. 99 (1 August 1988)

Grand Slam singles results
- Australian Open: 2R (1984)
- French Open: 3R (1985)
- Wimbledon: 2R (1985, 1986, 1987)
- US Open: 2R (1985)

Doubles
- Career record: 62–119
- Career titles: 0
- Highest ranking: No. 111 (12 October 1987)

Grand Slam doubles results
- French Open: F (1980)
- Wimbledon: 2R (1986)
- US Open: 2R (1986, 1987)

Adriana Villagrán (born 7 August 1956) is an Argentine tennis player, who played professionally in the 1980s. She is also known under the married name Adriana Villagrán-Reami.

== Career ==
In 1980, with compatriot Ivanna Madruga, she reached the women's doubles final at Roland Garros (losing to Kathy Jordan and Anne Smith). She participated in seven Grand Slam tournaments.

Adriana Villagrán represented her country in Federation Cup from 1979 to 1985.

== Grand Slam finals ==
=== Doubles: (1 runner–up) ===
Result	Year	Championship	Surface	Partner	Opponents	Score
Win	1980	French Open	Clay	(Argentina) Ivanna Madruga	(United States) Kathy Jordan (United States) Anne Smith	6–1, 6–0

== WTA Tour finals ==
=== Singles (2 runner-ups) ===
Result	W/L	Date	Tournament	Surface	Opponent	Score
Loss	0–1	Jul 1984	Rio de Janeiro, Brazil	Hard	(Italy) Sandra Cecchini	3–6, 3–6
Loss	0–2	Oct 1986	Taipei, Taiwan	Clay	(Hong Kong) Patricia Hy	7–6, 2–6, 3–6

=== Doubles (6 runner-ups) ===
Result	W/L	Date	Tournament	Surface	Partner	Opponents	Score
Loss	0–1	May 1980	Perugia, Italy	Clay	(Argentina) Ivanna Madruga	(Czechoslovakia) Hana Mandlíková (Czechoslovakia) Renáta Tomanová	4–6, 4–6
Loss	0–2	Jun 1980	French Open, France	Clay	(Argentina) Ivanna Madruga	(United States) Kathy Jordan (United States) Anne Smith	1–6, 0–6
Loss	0–3	Oct 1984	Tokyo, Japan	Hard	(Argentina) Emilse Raponi-Longo	(Argentina) Mercedes Paz (United States) Ronni Reis	4–6, 5–7
Loss	0–4	Oct 1984	Tokyo, Japan	Hard	(Argentina) Emilse Raponi-Longo	(United States) Betsy Nagelsen (United States) Candy Reynolds	3–6, 2–6
Loss	0–5	May 1985	Barcelona, Spain	Clay	(United States) Penny Barg	(Switzerland) Petra Jauch-Delhees (Brazil) Pat Medrado	1–6, 0–6
Loss	0–6	Dec 1985	Auckland, New Zealand	Grass	(United States) Lea Antonoplis	(United Kingdom) Anne Hobbs (United States) Candy Reynolds	1–6, 3–6
