= Ivanna Madruga =

Argentinian tennis player

- Full name: Ivanna Madruga-Osses
- Country (sports): Argentina
- Born: 27 January 1961 (age 65) Río Tercero, Argentina
- Turned pro: 1978
- Retired: 1986
- Plays: Right-handed
- Prize money: US$ 296,356

Singles
- Career record: 142-97
- Career titles: 1
- Highest ranking: No. 17 (26 September 1983)

Grand Slam singles results
- French Open: QF (1980)
- Wimbledon: 2R (1979)
- US Open: QF (1980, 1983)

Doubles
- Career record: 5–3
- Highest ranking: No. 110 (21 December 1986)

Grand Slam doubles results
- French Open: F (1980)

Ivanna Madruga (born 27 January 1961) is a retired tennis player from Argentina who played professionally in the 1980s. She also is known under the married name Ivanna Madruga-Osses.

== Career ==
In 1980, with compatriot Adriana Villagrán, she reached the women's doubles final at the Roland Garros, losing to Kathy Jordan and Anne Smith. She reached three quarterfinals in Grand Slam tournaments, once at the French Open and twice at the US Open. Her one tournament win, out of seven WTA finals, was against Patricia Medrado in Rio de Janeiro, on March 22, 1982. Out of Madruga's 142 career wins, 107 were on clay courts.

Madruga represented her country in Federation Cup from 1978 to 1984.

== Grand Slam finals ==
=== Women's doubles (1 runner–up) ===
Result	Year	Championship	Surface	Partner	Opponents	Score
Loss	1980	French Open	Clay	(Argentina) Adriana Villagrán	(United States) Kathy Jordan (United States) Anne Smith	6–1, 6–0

== WTA Tour finals ==
=== Singles (2 runner-ups) ===
Legend
Grand Slam	0
WTA Championships	0
Tier I	0
Tier II	0
Tier III	0
Tier IV & V	0

Result	W/L	Date	Tournament	Surface	Opponent	Score
Loss	0–1	Sep 1980	Salt Lake City, US	Hard	(Romania) Virginia Ruzici	1–6, 3–6
Loss	0–2	May 1981	Berlin, Germany	Clay	(Czechoslovakia) Regina Maršíková	2–6, 1–6
Win	1–2	Mar 1982	Rio de Janeiro, Brazil	Clay	(Brazil) Patricia Medrado	3–6, 6–1, 6–1

=== Doubles 6 (1 title, 5 runner-ups) ===
Legend
Grand Slam	0
WTA Championships	0
Tier I	0
Tier II	1
Tier III	0
Tier IV & V	2

Titles by surface
Hard	0
Clay	3
Grass	0
Carpet	0

Result	W/L	Date	Tournament	Surface	Partner	Opponents	Score
Loss	0–1	May 1980	Perugia, Italy	Clay	(Argentina) Adriana Villagrán	(Czechoslovakia) Hana Mandlíková (Czechoslovakia) Renáta Tomanová	4–6, 4–6
Loss	0–2	Jun 1980	French Open, France	Clay	(Argentina) Adriana Villagrán	(United States) Kathy Jordan (United States) Anne Smith	1–6, 0–6
Win	1–2	Aug 1982	Indianapolis, US	Clay	(France) Catherine Tanvier	(United States) Joanne Russell (Romania) Virginia Ruzici	7–5, 7–6^{(7–4)}
Loss	1–3	May 1983	Perugia, Italy	Clay	(France) Catherine Tanvier	(Romania) Virginia Ruzici (United Kingdom) Virginia Wade	3–6, 6–2, 1–6
Loss	1–4	Jul 1983	Hittfeld, West Germany	Clay	(France) Catherine Tanvier	(West Germany) Bettina Bunge (West Germany) Claudia Kohde-Kilsch	5–7, 4–6
Loss	1–5	Jul 1983	Freiburg, West Germany	Clay	(Argentina) Emilse Raponi	(West Germany) Bettina Bunge (West Germany) Eva Pfaff	1–6, 2–6
