= Kathy Jordan =

American tennis player (born 1959)

- Country (sports): United States
- Residence: Palo Alto, California, U.S.
- Born: December 3, 1959 (age 66) Bryn Mawr, Pennsylvania, U.S.
- Height: 1.73 m (5 ft 8 in)
- Turned pro: 1979
- Retired: 1991
- Plays: Right-handed (one handed-backhand)
- College: Stanford University
- Prize money: $1,592,111

Singles
- Career record: 247–155
- Career titles: 3
- Highest ranking: No. 5 (March 19, 1984)

Grand Slam singles results
- Australian Open: F (1983)
- French Open: QF (1980)
- Wimbledon: SF (1984)
- US Open: 4R (1979, 1980, 1981, 1983, 1985, 1986)

Doubles
- Career record: 473–136
- Career titles: 42
- Highest ranking: No. 6 (February 4, 1991)

Grand Slam doubles results
- Australian Open: W (1981)
- French Open: W (1980)
- Wimbledon: W (1980, 1985)
- US Open: W (1981)

Other doubles tournaments
- Tour Finals: W (1990)

Mixed doubles
- Career titles: 2

Grand Slam mixed doubles results
- Australian Open: 2R (1991)
- French Open: W (1986)
- Wimbledon: W (1986)
- US Open: QF (1984, 1986)
- Last updated on: May 24, 2012.

Kathryn Jordan (born December 3, 1959) is a former American tennis player. During her career, she won seven Grand Slam titles, five of them in women's doubles and two in mixed doubles. She also was the 1983 Australian Open women's singles runner-up and won three singles titles and 42 doubles titles.

== College ==
She received an athletic scholarship to Stanford University in 1978. While at Stanford, she won the 1979 AIAW Championships in singles and in doubles with her sister Barbara Jordan. in 1979, she won the Broderick Award (now the Honda Sports Award) as the best female collegiate player.

== Career ==
Jordan turned professional in 1979. Her best performance in a Grand Slam singles tournament was runner-up at the 1983 Australian Open, where she lost to Martina Navratilova in straight sets..

She was the first player to defeat Chris Evert before the semifinals of a Grand Slam singles tournament. Jordan defeated Evert 6–1, 7–6 in the third round of Wimbledon in 1983 after Evert had reached at least the semifinals of her first 34 Grand Slam singles tournaments. Jordan and Arantxa Sanchez-Vicario (also in the third round and by the same score 6–1, 7–6 at the 1988 French Open) are the only two women who ever beat Evert before the quarterfinals as Evert made 54 quarterfinals from the 56 grand slams she played in her career.

In women's doubles, Jordan won five Grand Slam titles, four of which were in partnership with Anne Smith. She also won a career Grand Slam in women's doubles, winning the 1980 French Open, 1980 and 1985 Wimbledon, 1981 US Open, and 1981 Australian Open.

In the Wimbledon final on July 6, 1985, Jordan and Elizabeth Smylie teamed to snap the 109-match winning streak of Navratilova and Pam Shriver by defeating them in three sets.

In mixed doubles, Jordan won two Grand Slam titles, 1986 French Open and 1986 Wimbledon, both of which were in partnership with Ken Flach.

Jordan retired in 1991. Her highest singles rank was world number five in 1984 and her highest doubles rank was world number 6 in 1991. She won several awards during her career, including 1979 WTA Most Impressive Newcomer Award, 1980 WTA Doubles Team of the Year Award with Smith, 1984 WTA Most Improved Player of the Year Award, and 1991 WTA Player Service Award

After retiring, Jordan returned to Stanford University and received a B.A. in political science in 1991. She was elected vice-president of the WTA in 1992. She also served as chairperson of the WTA Drug Testing Committee and served on WTA executive, deferred compensation, finance/marketing, and insurance committees through 1992.

In 2002, Jordan was presented with a Mentor Award by Martina Navratilova, on behalf of the WTA Tour, in recognition of her contribution to the Partners for Success program and to the sport of tennis at large.

== Personal life ==
Jordan was one of the top juniors during the 1970s. She also was a top high school basketball player, being named to the All-Conference basketball team while at Upper Merion Area High School in King of Prussia, Pennsylvania. Her sister won the 1979 Australian Open women's singles title. Her father, Bob Jordan, was instrumental in the development of the WTA deferred compensation plan. Now, Jordan lives in Palo Alto, California.

== Major finals ==
=== Grand Slam finals ===
==== Singles: 1 (1 runner–up) ====
Result	Year	Championship	Surface	Opponent	Score
Loss	1983	Australian Open	Grass	(United States) Martina Navratilova	6–2, 7–6^{(7–5)}

==== Doubles: 11 (5 titles, 6 runners-up) ====
Result	Year	Championship	Surface	Partner	Opponents	Score
Win	1980	French Open	Clay	(United States) Anne Smith	(Argentina) Ivanna Madruga (Argentina) Adriana Villagrán	6–1, 6–0
Win	1980	Wimbledon	Grass	(United States) Anne Smith	(United States) Rosemary Casals (Australia) Wendy Turnbull	4–6, 7–5, 6–1
Loss	1981	Wimbledon	Grass	(United States) Anne Smith	(United States) Martina Navratilova (United States) Pam Shriver	6–3, 7–6^{(8–6)}
Win	1981	US Open	Hard	(United States) Anne Smith	(United States) Rosemary Casals (Australia) Wendy Turnbull	6–3, 6–3
Win	1981	Australian Open	Grass	(United States) Anne Smith	(United States) Martina Navratilova (United States) Pam Shriver	6–2, 7–5
Loss	1982	Wimbledon	Grass	(United States) Anne Smith	(United States) Martina Navratilova (United States) Pam Shriver	6–4, 6–1
Loss	1983	French Open	Clay	(United States) Anne Smith	(South Africa) Rosalyn Fairbank (United States) Candy Reynolds	5–7, 7–5, 6–2
Loss	1984	Wimbledon	Grass	(United States) Anne Smith	(United States) Martina Navratilova (United States) Pam Shriver	6–3, 6–4
Win	1985	Wimbledon	Grass	(Australia) Elizabeth Smylie	(United States) Martina Navratilova (United States) Pam Shriver	5–7, 6–3, 6–4
Loss	1987	US Open	Hard	(Australia) Elizabeth Smylie	(United States) Martina Navratilova (United States) Pam Shriver	5–7, 6–4, 6–2
Loss	1990	Wimbledon	Grass	(Australia) Elizabeth Smylie	(Czechoslovakia) Jana Novotná (Czechoslovakia) Helena Suková	6–4, 6–1

==== Mixed doubles: 3 (2 titles, 1 runner–up) ====
Result	Year	Championship	Surface	Partner	Opponents	Score
Loss	1984	Wimbledon	Grass	(United States) Steve Denton	(Australia) Wendy Turnbull (United Kingdom) John Lloyd	6–3, 6–3
Win	1986	French Open	Clay	(United States) Ken Flach	(South Africa) Rosalyn Fairbank (Australia) Mark Edmondson	3–6, 7–6^{(7–3)}, 6–3
Win	1986	Wimbledon	Grass	(United States) Ken Flach	(United States) Martina Navratilova (Switzerland) Heinz Günthardt	6–3, 7–6^{(9–7)}

=== Year-end championships finals ===
==== Doubles: 2 (1 title, 1 runner–up) ====
Result	Year	Championship	Surface	Partner	Opponents	Score
Loss	1982	New York City	Carpet	(United States) Anne Smith	(United States) Martina Navratilova (United States) Pam Shriver	6–4, 6–3
Win	1990	New York City	Carpet	(Australia) Elizabeth Smylie	(Argentina) Mercedes Paz (Spain) Arantxa Sánchez Vicario	7–6^{(7–4)}, 6–4

== WTA career finals ==
=== Singles 13 (3–10) ===
Winner — Legend Grand Slam tournaments (0–1) WTA Tour Championships (0–0) Virginia Slims, Avon, Other (3–9)	Titles by surface Hard (1–1) Grass (0–3) Clay (0–0) Carpet (2–6)

Result	W/L	Date	Tournament	Surface	Opponent	Score
Win	1–0	Jan 1979	San Antonio, US	Carpet	(United States) Linda Siegel	6–2, 7–5
Win	2–0	Mar 1979	Orlando, US	Hard	(Czechoslovakia) Regina Maršíková	4–6, 6–1, 6–4
Loss	2–1	Aug 1979	Richmond, US	Carpet	(United States) Martina Navratilova	1–6, 3–6
Win	3–1	Mar 1982	Boston, US	Carpet	(Australia) Wendy Turnbull	7–5, 1–6, 6–4
Loss	3–2	Apr 1983	Atlanta, US	Hard	(United States) Pam Shriver	2–6, 0–6
Loss	3–3	Sep 1983	Richmond, US	Carpet	(South Africa) Rosalyn Fairbank	4–6, 7–5, 4–6
Loss	3–4	Oct 1983	Detroit, US	Carpet	(Romania) Virginia Ruzici	6–4, 4–6, 2–6
Loss	3–5	Nov 1983	Sydney, Australia	Grass	(United Kingdom) Jo Durie	3–6, 5–5
Loss	3–6	Nov 1983	Australian Open	Grass	(United States) Martina Navratilova	2–6, 6–7^{(5–7)}
Loss	3–7	Mar 1984	Dallas, US	Carpet	(Czechoslovakia) Hana Mandlíková	6–7^{(3–7)}, 6–3, 1–6
Loss	3–8	Jun 1984	Eastbourne, UK	Grass	(United States) Martina Navratilova	4–6, 1–6
Loss	3–9	May 1985	Melbourne, Australia	Carpet	(United States) Pam Shriver	4–6, 4–6
Loss	3–10	Feb 1986	Oakland, US	Carpet	(United States) Chris Evert-Lloyd	2–6, 4–6

=== Doubles 78 (42–36) ===
Winner — Legend Grand Slam tournaments (6–6) WTA Tour Championships (1–1) Tier I (0–0) Tier II (1–0) Tier III (1–0) Tier IV (2–1) Tier V (0–0) Virginia Slims, Avon, Other (31–28)	Titles by surface Hard (16–3) Grass (4–9) Clay (6–7) Carpet (16–17)

Result	No.	Date	Tournament	Surface	Partner	Opponent	Score
Win	1.	Jan 1979	San Antonio, US	Carpet	(United States) Wendy White	(United States) Bunny Bruning (United States) Valerie Ziegenfuss	6–2, 6–2
Win	2.	Aug 1979	Indianapolis, US	Clay	(United States) Anne Smith	(United States) Penny Johnson (United States) Paula Smith	6–1, 6–0
Loss	1.	Jan 1980	Chicago, US	Carpet	(West Germany) Sylvia Hanika	(United States) Billie Jean King (United States) Martina Navratilova	3–6, 4–6
Loss	2.	Feb 1980	Los Angeles, US	Carpet	(United States) Anne Smith	(United States) Rosemary Casals (United States) Martina Navratilova	6–7, 2–6
Loss	3.	Feb 1980	Detroit, US	Carpet	(United States) Anne Smith	(United States) Billie Jean King (South Africa) Ilana Kloss	6–3, 3–6, 2–6
Win	3.	Apr 1980	Hilton Head Island, US	Clay	(United States) Anne Smith	(United States) Candy Reynolds (United States) Paula Smith	6–2, 6–1
Loss	4.	Apr 1980	Amelia Island, US	Clay	(United States) Pam Shriver	(United States) Rosemary Casals (South Africa) Ilana Kloss	6–7, 6–7
Win	4.	May 1980	French Open	Clay	(United States) Anne Smith	(Argentina) Ivanna Madruga (Argentina) Adriana Villagrán	6–1, 6–0
Win	5.	Jun 1980	Eastbourne, UK	Grass	(United States) Anne Smith	(United States) Pam Shriver (Netherlands) Betty Stöve	6–4, 6–1
Win	6.	Jun 1980	Wimbledon	Grass	(United States) Anne Smith	(United States) Rosemary Casals (Australia) Wendy Turnbull	4–6, 7–5, 6–1
Win	7.	Sep 1980	Las Vegas, US	Hard (I)	(United States) Anne Smith	(United States) Martina Navratilova (Netherlands) Betty Stöve	2–6, 6–4, 6–3
Loss	5.	Sep 1980	Atlanta, US	Carpet	(United States) Anne Smith	(United States) Barbara Potter (United States) Sharon Walsh	3–6, 1–6
Win	8.	Oct 1980	Brighton, UK	Carpet	(United States) Anne Smith	(United States) Martina Navratilova (Netherlands) Betty Stöve	6–3, 7–5
Loss	6.	Nov 1980	Filderstadt, West Germany	Hard (I)	(United States) Anne Smith	(Czechoslovakia) Hana Mandlíková (Netherlands) Betty Stöve	4–6, 5–7
Win	9.	Jan 1981	Cincinnati, US	Carpet	(United States) Anne Smith	(United States) Martina Navratilova (United States) Pam Shriver	1–6, 6–3, 6–3
Loss	7.	Mar 1981	Dallas, US	Carpet	(United States) Anne Smith	(United States) Martina Navratilova (United States) Pam Shriver	5–7, 4–6
Win	10.	Apr 1981	Amelia Island, US	Clay	(United States) Paula Smith	(United States) JoAnne Russell (United States) Pam Shriver	6–3, 5–7, 7–6
Loss	8.	Jun 1981	Eastbourne, UK	Grass	(United States) Anne Smith	(United States) Martina Navratilova (United States) Pam Shriver	7–6, 2–6, 1–6
Loss	9.	Jun 1981	Wimbledon	Grass	(United States) Anne Smith	(United States) Martina Navratilova (United States) Pam Shriver	3–6, 6–7^{(6–8)}
Win	11.	Jul 1981	San Diego, US	Hard	(United States) Candy Reynolds	(United States) Rosemary Casals (United States) Pam Shriver	6–1, 2–6, 6–4
Loss	10.	Aug 1981	Richmond, US	Carpet	(United States) Anne Smith	(United Kingdom) Sue Barker (United States) Ann Kiyomura	6–4, 6–7, 4–6
Win	12.	Sep 1981	US Open	Hard	(United States) Anne Smith	(United States) Rosemary Casals (Australia) Wendy Turnbull	6–3, 6–3
Loss	11.	Nov 1981	Sydney, Australia	Grass	(United States) Anne Smith	(United States) Martina Navratilova (United States) Pam Shriver	7–6, 2–6, 4–6
Win	13.	Nov 1981	Australian Open	Grass	(United States) Anne Smith	(United States) Martina Navratilova (United States) Pam Shriver	6–2, 7–5
Win	14.	Jan 1982	Washington, D.C., US	Carpet	(United States) Anne Smith	(United States) Martina Navratilova (United States) Pam Shriver	6–2, 3–6, 6–1
Loss	12.	Jan 1982	Seattle, US	Carpet	(United States) Anne Smith	(United States) Rosemary Casals (Australia) Wendy Turnbull	5–7, 4–6
Win	15.	Feb 1982	Houston, US	Carpet	(United States) Pam Shriver	(United Kingdom) Sue Barker (United States) Sharon Walsh	7–6^{(8–6)}, 6–2
Loss	13.	Feb 1982	Oakland, US	Carpet	(United States) Pam Shriver	(United States) Barbara Potter (United States) Sharon Walsh	1–6, 6–3, 6–7^{(5–7)}
Win	16.	Mar 1982	Los Angeles, US	Carpet	(United States) Anne Smith	(United States) Barbara Potter (United States) Sharon Walsh	6–3, 7–5
Win	17.	Mar 1982	Boston, US	Carpet	(United States) Anne Smith	(United States) Rosemary Casals (Australia) Wendy Turnbull	7–6, 2–6, 6–4
Loss	14.	Mar 1982	Avon Championships, US	Carpet	(United States) Anne Smith	(United States) Martina Navratilova (United States) Pam Shriver	4–6, 3–6
Loss	15.	Apr 1982	Fort Worth, US	Clay	(United States) Anne Smith	(United States) Martina Navratilova (United States) Pam Shriver	5–7, 3–6
Loss	16.	Apr 1982	Orlando, US	Clay	(United States) Anne Smith	(United States) Rosemary Casals (Australia) Wendy Turnbull	3–6, 3–6
Loss	17.	Jun 1982	Eastbourne, UK	Grass	(United States) Anne Smith	(United States) Martina Navratilova (United States) Pam Shriver	3–6, 4–6
Loss	18.	Jun 1982	Wimbledon	Grass	(United States) Anne Smith	(United States) Martina Navratilova (United States) Pam Shriver	4–6, 1–6
Win	18.	Jul 1982	San Diego, US	Hard	(United States) Paula Smith	(Brazil) Patricia Medrado (Brazil) Cláudia Monteiro	6–3, 5–7, 7–6
Win	19.	Aug 1982	Atlanta, US	Hard	(United States) Betsy Nagelsen	(United States) Chris Evert (United States) Billie Jean King	4–6, 7–6^{(13–11)}, 7–6^{(7–3)}
Loss	19.	Jan 1983	Washington, D.C., US	Carpet	(United States) Anne Smith	(United States) Martina Navratilova (United States) Pam Shriver	6–4, 5–7, 3–6
Loss	20.	Jan 1983	Palm Beach Gardens, US	Clay	(United States) Paula Smith	(United States) Barbara Potter (United States) Sharon Walsh	4–6, 6–4, 2–6
Loss	21.	Feb 1983	Chicago, US	Carpet	(United States) Anne Smith	(United States) Martina Navratilova (United States) Pam Shriver	1–6, 2–6
Win	20.	Feb 1983	Palm Springs, US	Hard	(United States) Ann Kiyomura	(Australia) Dianne Fromholtz (Netherlands) Betty Stöve	6–2, 6–2
Loss	22.	Mar 1983	Boston, US	Carpet	(United States) Anne Smith	(United Kingdom) Jo Durie (United States) Ann Kiyomura	3–6, 1–6
Loss	23.	Mar 1983	Tokyo, Japan	Carpet	(United States) Anne Smith	(United States) Billie Jean King (United States) Sharon Walsh	1–6, 1–6
Loss	24.	May 1983	French Open	Clay	(United States) Anne Smith	(South Africa) Rosalyn Fairbank (United States) Candy Reynolds	7–5, 5–7, 2–6
Loss	25.	Sep 1983	Richmond, US	Carpet	(United States) Barbara Potter	(South Africa) Rosalyn Fairbank (United States) Candy Reynolds	7–6^{(7–3)}, 2–6, 1–6
Loss	26.	Sep 1983	Hartford, US	Carpet	(United States) Barbara Potter	(United States) Billie Jean King (United States) Sharon Walsh	6–3, 3–6, 4–6
Win	21.	Oct 1983	Detroit, US	Carpet	(United States) Barbara Potter	(United States) Rosemary Casals (Australia) Wendy Turnbull	6–4, 6–1
Win	22.	Apr 1984	Amelia Island, US	Clay	(United States) Anne Smith	(United Kingdom) Anne Hobbs (Socialist Federal Republic of Yugoslavia) Mima Jaušovec	6–4, 3–6, 6–4
Loss	27.	Jun 1984	Wimbledon	Grass	(United States) Anne Smith	(United States) Martina Navratilova (United States) Pam Shriver	3–6, 4–6
Win	23.	Aug 1984	Montreal, Canada	Hard	(Australia) Elizabeth Smylie	(West Germany) Claudia Kohde-Kilsch (Czechoslovakia) Hana Mandlíková	6–1, 6–2
Win	24.	Jan 1985	Key Biscayne, US	Hard	(Australia) Elizabeth Smylie	(Soviet Union) Svetlana Parkhomenko (Soviet Union) Larisa Savchenko	6–4, 7–6^{(7–2)}
Win	25.	Jan 1985	Marco Island, US	Hard	(Australia) Elizabeth Smylie	(United States) Camille Benjamin (United States) Bonnie Gadusek	6–3, 6–3
Loss	28.	Feb 1985	Delray Beach, US	Hard	(Czechoslovakia) Hana Mandlíková	(United States) Gigi Fernández (United States) Martina Navratilova	6–7^{(4–7)}, 2–6
Win	26.	Apr 1985	Tokyo, Japan	Carpet	(Australia) Elizabeth Smylie	(United States) Betsy Nagelsen (United States) Anne White	6–4, 5–7, 2–6
Loss	29.	May 1985	Melbourne, Australia	Carpet	(United Kingdom) Anne Hobbs	(United States) Pam Shriver (Australia) Elizabeth Smylie	2–6, 7–5, 1–6
Loss	30.	Jun 1985	Eastbourne, UK	Grass	(Australia) Elizabeth Smylie	(United States) Martina Navratilova (United States) Pam Shriver	5–7, 4–6
Win	27.	Jun 1985	Wimbledon	Grass	(Australia) Elizabeth Smylie	(United States) Martina Navratilova (United States) Pam Shriver	5–7, 6–3, 6–4
Win	28.	Aug 1985	Mahwah, US	Hard	(Australia) Elizabeth Smylie	(West Germany) Claudia Kohde-Kilsch (Czechoslovakia) Helena Suková	7–6^{(8–6)}, 6–3
Win	29.	Sep 1985	Chicago, US	Carpet	(Australia) Elizabeth Smylie	(United States) Elise Burgin (United States) JoAnne Russell	6–2, 6–2
Win	30.	Jan 1986	Wichita, US	Carpet	(United States) Candy Reynolds	(United States) JoAnne Russell (United States) Anne Smith	6–3, 6–7^{(5–7)}, 6–3
Win	31.	Jan 1986	Key Biscayne, US	Hard	(Australia) Elizabeth Smylie	(United States) Betsy Nagelsen (United States) Barbara Potter	7–6^{(7–5)}, 2–6, 6–2
Win	32.	Mar 1986	Princeton, US	Carpet	(Australia) Elizabeth Smylie	(Czechoslovakia) Hana Mandlíková (Czechoslovakia) Helena Suková	6–3, 7–5
Loss	31.	Mar 1986	Nashville, US	Carpet	(Australia) Elizabeth Smylie	(United States) Barbara Potter (United States) Pam Shriver	4–6, 3–6
Loss	32.	Mar 1986	Marco Island, US	Clay	(United States) Elise Burgin	(United States) Martina Navratilova (Hungary) Andrea Temesvári	5–7, 2–6
Win	33.	Sep 1986	Hilversum, Betherlands	Carpet	(Czechoslovakia) Helena Suková	(Denmark) Tine Scheuer-Larsen (France) Catherine Tanvier	7–5, 6–1
Win	34.	Apr 1987	Tokyo, Japan	Hard	(United States) Betsy Nagelsen	(United States) Sandy Collins (United States) Sharon Walsh	6–3, 7–5
Win	35.	Apr 1987	Houston, US	Clay	(United States) Martina Navratilova	(United States) Zina Garrison (United States) Lori McNeil	6–2, 6–4
Loss	33.	Jul 1987	Newport, US	Grass	(United Kingdom) Anne Hobbs	(United States) Gigi Fernández (United States) Lori McNeil	6–7^{(5–7)}, 5–7
Win	36.	Jul 1987	Aptos, US	Hard	(United States) Robin White	(United States) Lea Antonoplis (United States) Barbara Gerken	6–1, 6–0
Loss	34.	Aug 1987	US Open	Hard	(Australia) Elizabeth Smylie	(United States) Martina Navratilova (United States) Pam Shriver	7–5, 4–6, 2–6
Win	37.	Oct 1987	Brighton, UK	Carpet	(Czech Republic) Helena Suková	(Denmark) Tine Scheuer-Larsen (France) Catherine Tanvier	7–5, 6–1
Win	38.	Mar 1990	San Antonio, US	Hard	(Australia) Elizabeth Smylie	(United States) Gigi Fernández (United States) Robin White	7–5, 7–5
Win	39.	Apr 1990	Tokyo, Japan	Hard	(Australia) Elizabeth Smylie	(United States) Hu Na (Australia) Michelle Jaggard	6–0, 3–6, 6–1
Loss	35.	May 1990	Strasbourg, France	Clay	(Australia) Elizabeth Smylie	(Australia) Nicole Provis (South Africa) Elna Reinach	1–6, 4–6
Loss	36.	Jun 1990	Wimbledon	Grass	(Australia) Elizabeth Smylie	(Czechoslovakia) Jana Novotná (Czechoslovakia) Helena Suková	3–6, 4–6
Win	40.	Oct 1990	Nashville, US	Hard (I)	(Soviet Union) Larisa Neiland	(Netherlands) Brenda Schultz (Netherlands) Caroline Vis	6–1, 6–2
Win	41.	Nov 1990	Virginia Slims Championships, US	Carpet	(Australia) Elizabeth Smylie	(Argentina) Mercedes Paz (Spain) Arantxa Sánchez Vicario	7–6^{(7–4)}, 6–4
Win	42.	Jan 1991	Tokyo, Japan	Carpet	(Australia) Elizabeth Smylie	(United States) Mary Joe Fernández (United States) Robin White	4–6, 6–0, 6–3

== Grand Slam performance timelines ==
Key
W	F	SF	QF	#R	RR	Q#	DNQ	A	NH

(W) winner; (F) finalist; (SF) semifinalist; (QF) quarterfinalist; (#R) rounds 4, 3, 2, 1; (RR) round-robin stage; (Q#) qualification round; (DNQ) did not qualify; (A) absent; (NH) not held; (SR) strike rate (events won / competed); (W–L) win–loss record.

=== Singles ===
Tournament	1977		1978	1979	1980	1981	1982	1983	1984	1985	1986	1987	1988	1989	1990	W–L
Australian Open	A	A	A	A	A	3R	A	F	A	A	NH	A	A	A	A	7–2
French Open	A		A	A	QF	3R	A	4R	2R	A	1R	A	A	A	A	8–5
Wimbledon	A		A	4R	4R	4R	3R	QF	SF	2R	4R	1R	A	A	1R	21–10
US Open	Q1		2R	4R	4R	4R	1R	4R	2R	4R	4R	1R	A	A	1R	20–11
Year-end ranking	NR		NR	11	13	15	21	13	10	19	15	35	NR	NR	205	

=== Doubles ===
Tournament	1978	1979	1980	1981	1982	1983	1984	1985	1986	1987	1988	1989	1990	1991	W–L
Australian Open	A	A	A	W	A	SF	A	A	NH	A	A	A	3R	QF	13–3
French Open	A	2R	W	QF	A	F	QF	A	QF	A	A	A	2R	QF	24–7
Wimbledon	A	1R	W	F	F	QF	F	W	3R	QF	A	A	F	QF	39–9
US Open	QF	2R	SF	W	QF	SF	3R	2R	QF	F	A	QF	SF	A	38–11
Year-end ranking							4	5	10	10	NR	65	9	21	

=== Mixed doubles ===
Tournament	1979	1980	1981	1982	1983	1984	1985	1986	1987	1988	1989	1990	1991	W–L
Australian Open	NH	NH	NH	NH	NH	NH	NH	NH	A	A	A	A	2R	1–1
French Open	A	2R	A	A	A	A	A	W	A	A	A	1R	QF	9–3
Wimbledon	A	1R	A	A	QF	F	SF	W	QF	A	A	2R	2R	21–7
US Open	2R	A	A	A	2R	QF	1R	QF	2R	A	A	1R	A	7–7

Note: The Australian Open was held twice in 1977, in January and December.

Awards
Preceded by Pam Shriver	WTA Newcomer of the Year; 1979	Succeeded by Andrea Jaeger
