= 1980 French Open =

- Date: 26 May – 8 June 1980
- Edition: 79
- Category: 50th Grand Slam (ITF)
- Draw: 128S / 64D / 32X
- Prize money: $400,000
- Surface: Clay / outdoor
- Location: Paris (XVI^{e}), France
- Venue: Stade Roland Garros

Champions

Men's singles
- (Sweden) Björn Borg

Women's singles
- (United States) Chris Evert

Men's doubles
- (United States) Victor Amaya / (United States) Hank Pfister

Women's doubles
- (United States) Kathy Jordan / (United States) Anne Smith

Mixed doubles
- (United States) Anne Smith / (United States) Billy Martin
- French Open

The 1980 French Open was a tennis tournament that took place on the outdoor clay courts at the Stade Roland Garros in Paris, France. The tournament ran from 26 May until 8 June. It was the 79th staging of the French Open, and the first Grand Slam tennis event of 1980.

== Finals ==
=== Men's singles ===
(Sweden) Björn Borg defeated (United States) Vitas Gerulaitis, 6–4, 6–1, 6–2

- It was Borg's 9th career Grand Slam title, and his 5th French Open title.

=== Women's singles ===
(United States) Chris Evert defeated (Romania) Virginia Ruzici, 6–0, 6–3

- It was Evert's 10th career Grand Slam title, and her 4th French Open title.

=== Men's doubles ===
(United States) Victor Amaya / (United States) Hank Pfister defeated (United States) Brian Gottfried / (Mexico) Raúl Ramírez, 1–6, 6–4, 6–4, 6–3

=== Women's doubles ===
(United States) Kathy Jordan / (United States) Anne Smith defeated (Argentina) Ivanna Madruga / (Argentina) Adriana Villagrán, 6–1, 6–0

=== Mixed doubles ===
(United States) Anne Smith / (United States) Billy Martin defeated (Czechoslovakia) Renáta Tomanová / (Czechoslovakia) Stanislav Birner, 2–6, 6–4, 8–6

Preceded by 1979 Australian Open	Grand Slams	Succeeded by 1980 Wimbledon Championships
