= Stanislav Birner =

Czech tennis player (born 1956)

- Country (sports): Czechoslovakia
- Born: 11 October 1956 (age 69) Karlovy Vary, Czechoslovakia
- Height: 1.70 m (5 ft 7 in)
- Plays: Right-handed
- Prize money: $298,727

Singles
- Career record: 62–120
- Career titles: 0
- Highest ranking: No. 60 (12 April 1982)

Grand Slam singles results
- French Open: 4R (1978)
- Wimbledon: 3R (1982)
- US Open: 1R (1978, 1980)

Doubles
- Career record: 119–153
- Career titles: 2
- Highest ranking: No. 43 (2 November 1987)

Stanislav Birner (born 11 October 1956) is a former professional tennis player from Czechoslovakia.

He is married to Jana Birnerová and has two daughters, Eva Birnerová and Hana Birnerová. Eva Birnerová played tennis until 2014 on professional level and reached No. 59 (singles) and 52 (doubles) in the world rankings.

He lives in the Czech Republic.

Birner enjoyed most of his tennis success while playing doubles. During his career, he won two doubles titles and achieved a career-high doubles ranking of world No. 43 in 1987.

== Grand Slam finals ==
=== Mixed doubles: 1 runner-up ===
Result	Year	Championship	Surface	Partner	Opponents	Score
Loss	1980	French Open	Clay	(Czechoslovakia) Renáta Tomanová	(United States) Anne Smith (United States) Billy Martin	6–2, 4–6, 6–8

== Career finals ==
=== Doubles (2 titles, 5 runner-ups) ===
Result	W/L	Date	Tournament	Surface	Partner	Opponents	Score
Loss	0–1	Jun 1979	Berlin, West Germany	Clay	(Venezuela) Jorge Andrew	(Brazil) Carlos Kirmayr (Czechoslovakia) Ivan Lendl	2–6, 1–6
Loss	0–2	Mar 1980	Nice, France	Clay	(Czechoslovakia) Jiří Hřebec	(United States) Chris Delaney (Australia) Kim Warwick	4–6, 0–6
Win	1–2	Sep 1983	Geneva, Switzerland	Clay	(United States) Blaine Willenborg	(Sweden) Joakim Nyström (Sweden) Mats Wilander	6–1, 2–6, 6–3
Loss	1–3	Nov 1983	Ferrara, Italy	Carpet	(Sweden) Stefan Simonsson	(South Africa) Bernard Mitton (United States) Butch Walts	6–7, 6–0, 3–6
Win	2–3	Apr 1984	Bari, Italy	Clay	(Czechoslovakia) Libor Pimek	(United States) Marcel Freeman (United States) Tim Wilkison	2–6, 7–6, 6–4
Loss	2–4	Aug 1987	Prague, Czechoslovakia	Clay	(Czechoslovakia) Jaroslav Navrátil	(Czechoslovakia) Miloslav Mečíř (Czechoslovakia) Tomáš Šmíd	3–6, 7–6, 3–6
Loss	2–5	Oct 1987	Basel, Switzerland	Hard (i)	(Czechoslovakia) Jaroslav Navrátil	(Sweden) Anders Järryd (Czechoslovakia) Tomáš Šmíd	4–6, 3–6
