= Renáta Tomanová =

Czech tennis player

- Country (sports): Czechoslovakia
- Born: 9 December 1954 (age 71) Jindřichův Hradec, Czechoslovakia
- Height: 1.68 m (5 ft 6 in)
- Plays: Right-handed
- Prize money: US$ 275,644

Singles
- Career record: 123–136
- Career titles: 4
- Highest ranking: No. 22

Grand Slam singles results
- Australian Open: F (1976)
- French Open: F (1976)
- Wimbledon: 3R (1975, 1976, 1977, 1978, 1981)
- US Open: 4R (1980)

Doubles
- Career record: 120–140
- Career titles: 4

Grand Slam doubles results
- Australian Open: W (1978)
- French Open: SF (1974, 1975, 1976, 1980)
- Wimbledon: 3R (1977)
- US Open: 3R (1979, 1980)

Grand Slam mixed doubles results
- French Open: W (1978)
- Wimbledon: QF (1979)
- US Open: 2R (1978, 1980)

Team competitions
- Fed Cup: W (1975)
Medal record
Representing Czechoslovakia
Summer Universiade
Gold medal – first place	1977 Sofia	Mixed doubles
Silver medal – second place	1977 Sofia	Doubles
Silver medal – second place	1977 Sofia	Singles

Renáta Tomanová (born 9 December 1954) is a Czech former professional tennis player.

== Career ==
Tomanová won the girls' singles title at the 1972 French Open.

In 1975, she and Martina Navratilova represented Czechoslovakia in the Federation Cup, the international women's team competition. They won the cup after beating the Australian team 3–0 in the final of the World Group. Between 1975 and 1981, she played in 18 ties for the Czechoslovak team and compiled a 20–7 win–loss record. In May 1975, she won the singles title at the West German Championships in Hamburg after a three-set final against Kazuko Sawamatsu. In 1976, Tomanová reached the singles final at both the French Open and the Australian Open. She lost at the French Open to Sue Barker in three sets and at the Australian Open to Evonne Goolagong in straight sets. Tomanová also reached the women's doubles final at the Australian Open with Lesley Turner Bowrey, losing to Goolagong and Helen Gourlay Cawley.

In May 1977, she reached the final of the Italian Open, losing to Janet Newberry. In 1978, Tomanová teamed with Betsy Nagelsen to win the women's doubles title at the Australian Open, defeating Naoko Sato and Pam Whytcross in the final in straight sets. With compatriot Pavel Složil, she won the mixed doubles title at the 1978 French Open.

Tomanová was coached by Věra Suková.

Senior tour

Tomanová is active on the senior tour, and in 2011, she received the Deutsche Tennis Preis from the German tennis federation for her achievements during the 2010 season.

== Grand Slam finals ==
=== Singles (2 runner-ups) ===
Result	Year	Championship	Surface	Opponent	Score
Loss	1976	Australian Open	Grass	(Australia) Evonne Goolagong	2–6, 2–6
Loss	1976	French Open	Clay	(United Kingdom) Sue Barker	2–6, 6–0, 2–6

=== Doubles: 2 (1 title, 1 runner-up) ===
Result	Year	Championship	Surface	Partner	Opponents	Score
Loss	1976	Australian Open	Grass	(Australia) Lesley Turner Bowrey	(Australia) Evonne Goolagong (Australia) Helen Gourlay	1–8
Win	1978	Australian Open	Grass	(United States) Betsy Nagelsen	(Japan) Naoko Sato (Australia) Pam Whytcross	7–5, 6–2

=== Mixed doubles: 2 (1 title, 1 runner-up) ===
Result	Year	Championship	Surface	Partner	Opponents	Score
Win	1978	French Open	Clay	(Czechoslovakia) Pavel Složil	(Romania) Virginia Ruzici (France) Patrice Dominguez	7–6 ret.
Loss	1980	French Open	Clay	(Czechoslovakia) Stanislav Birner	(United States) Anne Smith (United States) Billy Martin	6–2, 4–6, 6–8

== WTA career finals ==
=== Singles: 9 (4 titles, 5 runner-ups) ===
Result	W/L	Date	Tournament	Surface	Opponent	Score
Loss	0–1	Jan 1976	Australian Open	Grass	(Australia) Evonne Goolagong	2–6, 2–6
Win	1–1	May 1975	Hamburg, West Germany	Clay	(Japan) Kazuko Sawamatsu	7–6, 5–7, 10–8
Loss	1–2	May 1976	Hamburg, West Germany	Clay	(United Kingdom) Sue Barker	3–6, 1–6
Loss	1–3	Jun 1976	French Open	Clay	(United Kingdom) Sue Barker	2–6, 6–0, 2–6
Win	2–3	Jul 1976	Båstad, Sweden	Clay	(Sweden) Helena Anliot	6–3, 6–2
Win	3–3	Oct 1976	Madrid, Spain	Clay	(Romania) Virginia Ruzici	3–6, 6–4, 6–2
Loss	3–4	May 1977	Italian Open, Italy	Clay	(Australia) Janet Newberry	3–6, 6–7^{(5–7)}
Win	4–4	Jul 1977	Kitzbühel, Austria	Clay	(West Germany) Katja Ebbinghaus	6–3, 7–5
Loss	4–5	Jul 1982	Hamburg, West Germany	Clay	(United States) Lisa Bonder	3–6, 2–6

=== Doubles: 7 (4 titles, 3 runner-ups) ===
Result	W/L	Date	Tournament	Surface	Partner	Opponents	Score
Win	1–0	May 1975	Hamburg, West Germany	Clay	(Australia) Dianne Fromholtz	(Israel) Paulina Peisachov (Japan) Kazuko Sawamatsu	6–3, 6–2
Loss	1–1	Jan 1976	Australian Open	Grass	(Australia) Lesley Turner Bowrey	(Australia) Evonne Goolagong (Australia) Helen Gourlay	1–8
Loss	1–2	Dec 1976	Sydney, Australia	Grass	(Australia) Dianne Fromholtz	(Australia) Helen Gourlay (United States) Betsy Nagelsen	4–6, 1–6
Win	2–2	Dec 1977	London, United Kingdom	Hard	(United States) Billie Jean King	(Netherlands) Betty Stöve (United Kingdom) Virginia Wade	6–2, 6–3
Win	3–2	Jan 1979	Australian Open	Grass	(United States) Betsy Nagelsen	(Japan) Naoko Sato (Australia) Pam Whytcross	7–5, 6–2
Win	4–2	May 1980	Perugia, Italy	Clay	(Czechoslovakia) Hana Mandlíková	(Argentina) Ivanna Madruga (Argentina) Adriana Villagrán	6–4, 6–4
Loss	4–3	Jul 1980	Kitzbühel, Austria	Clay	(Czechoslovakia) Hana Mandlíková	(West Germany) Claudia Kohde-Kilsch (West Germany) Eva Pfaff	w/o

== Grand Slam singles tournament timeline ==
Key
W	F	SF	QF	#R	RR	Q#	DNQ	A	NH

(W) winner; (F) finalist; (SF) semifinalist; (QF) quarterfinalist; (#R) rounds 4, 3, 2, 1; (RR) round-robin stage; (Q#) qualification round; (DNQ) did not qualify; (A) absent; (NH) not held; (SR) strike rate (events won / competed); (W–L) win–loss record.

Tournament	1973	1974	1975	1976	1977		1978	1979	1980	1981	1982	1983	1984	1985	1986	Career SR
Australian Open	A	A	A	F	A	A	QF	SF	2R	1R	2R	A	A	A	NH	0 / 6
French Open	3R	1R	3R	F	QF		2R	QF	1R	2R	2R	1R	LQ	LQ	A	0 / 11
Wimbledon	1R	2R	3R	3R	3R		3R	1R	1R	3R	2R	1R	LQ	A	A	0 / 11
US Open	A	A	1R	3R	2R		3R	2R	4R	3R	1R	1R	A	LQ	A	0 / 9
SR	0 / 2	0 / 2	0 / 3	0 / 4	0 / 3		0 / 4	0 / 4	0 / 4	0 / 4	0 / 4	0 / 3	0 / 0	0 / 0	0 / 0	0 / 37
Year-end ranking			44	48	24		38	44	48	56	85	146	264	217	346	

Note: The Australian Open was held twice in 1977, in January and December.

== See also ==
- Performance timelines for all female tennis players since 1978 who reached at least one Grand Slam final
