= Billy Martin (tennis) =

American tennis player

- Country (sports): United States
- Residence: Los Angeles, California, U.S.
- Born: December 25, 1956 (age 69) Evanston, Illinois, U.S.
- Height: 5 ft 10 in (1.78 m)
- Turned pro: 1975
- Retired: 1982
- Plays: Right-handed (one-handed backhand)

Singles
- Career record: 144–175
- Career titles: 1
- Highest ranking: No. 32 (5 March 1975)

Grand Slam singles results
- Australian Open: 1R (1980)
- French Open: 3R (1981)
- Wimbledon: QF (1977)
- US Open: 2R (1973, 1976)

Doubles
- Career record: 126–160
- Career titles: 3

Grand Slam doubles results
- Australian Open: SF (1980)
- French Open: SF (1981)
- Wimbledon: 3R (1973, 1977, 1981)
- US Open: 2R (1975)

Mixed doubles
- Career titles: 1

Grand Slam mixed doubles results
- French Open: W (1980)

Billy Martin (born December 25, 1956) is a former professional tennis player from the United States. During his career, he won the NCAA Singles Title in 1975, defeating George Hardie, and one singles title and three doubles titles on the Pro Tour. He achieved a career-high singles ranking of world No. 32 in 1975. Martin currently serves as the head coach for the UCLA Bruins men's tennis team, a position he has held since 1994. Martin, who played at UCLA, has 14 straight top 5 NCAA team finishes and 9 consecutive 20-win seasons. He was named ITA (Intercollegiate Tennis Association) division 1 National Coach of the Year and is a member of ITA Hall of Fame. He beat Raul Ramirez and Stan Smith at the Washington D.C. tournament.

== Career finals ==
=== Singles: 2 (1 title / 1 runner-up) ===
Result	W–L	Date	Tournament	Surface	Opponent	Score
Loss	0–1	Jan 1975	Birmingham, U.S.	Carpet	(United States) Jimmy Connors	4–6, 3–6
Win	1–1	Feb 1975	Little Rock, U.S.	Carpet	(United States) George Hardie	6–2, 7–6

=== Doubles: 7 (3 titles / 4 runner-ups) ===
Result	W–L	Date	Tournament	Surface	Partner	Opponents	Score
Loss	0–1	Apr 1976	Denver WCT, U.S.	Carpet	(United States) Jimmy Connors	(Australia) John Fitzgerald (Australia) Phil Dent	7–6, 2–6, 5–7
Loss	0–2	Jan 1977	Birmingham WCT, U.S.	Carpet	(United States) Bill Scanlon	(Poland) Wojciech Fibak (Netherlands) Tom Okker	3–6, 4–6
Loss	0–3	Mar 1977	Monterrey WCT, Mexico	Carpet	(United States) Bill Scanlon	(Australia) Ross Case (Poland) Wojciech Fibak	6–3, 3–6, 4–6
Win	1–3	Sep 1977	Laguna Niguel, U.S.	Hard	(United States) James Chico Hagey	(United States) Peter Fleming (United States) Trey Waltke	6–3, 6–4
Win	2–3	Jun 1979	Brussels, Belgium	Clay	(Australia) Peter McNamara	(Brazil) Carlos Kirmayr (Hungary) Balázs Taróczy	5–7, 7–5, 6–4
Win	3–3	Jun 1981	Bristol, England	Grass	(New Zealand) Russell Simpson	(United States) John Austin (South Africa) Johan Kriek	6–3, 4–6, 6–4
Loss	3–4	Jul 1981	Newport, U.S.	Grass	(South Africa) Kevin Curren	(Australia) Brad Drewett (United States) Erik van Dillen	2–6, 4–6
