= 1975 French Open – Men's singles qualifying =

Men's singles qualifying
- 1975 French Open

Events
Singles	men	women		boys	girls
Doubles	men	women	mixed	boys	girls
WC Singles	men	women	quad
WC Doubles	men	women	quad
Legends	−45	45+	women
- French Open

Players who neither had high enough rankings nor received wild cards to enter the main draw of the annual French Open Tennis Championships participated in a qualifying tournament held in the week before the event.

== Qualifiers ==
1. (France) Patrice Beust
2. (Romania) Toma Ovici
3. (West Germany) Rolf Gehring
4. (Spain) Miguel Mir Rodon
5. (Italy) Piero Toci
6. (Spain) Juan Ignacio Muntañola
7. (France) Jean-Claude Barclay
8. (Spain) José Castañón
9. (Monaco) Louis Borfiga
10. (Poland) Jacek Niedźwiedzki
11. (Argentina) Ricardo Cano
12. (Australia) Bob Rheinberger
13. (Hungary) Szabolcs Baranyi
14. (Brazil) Carlos Kirmayr
15. (Soviet Union) Anatoli Volkov
16. (Romania) Ionel Santeiu

== Lucky losers ==
1. (United Kingdom) Martin Robinson
2. (West Germany) Ulrich Marten
3. (United States) Armistead Neely
4. (Venezuela) Jorge Andrew

== Qualifying draw ==
Key

- Q = Qualifier
- WC = Wild card
- LL = Lucky loser
- Alt = Alternate
- ITF = ITF entry
- PR = Protected ranking
- SR = Special ranking
- SE = Special exempt
- JE = Junior exempt
- JR = Junior Accelerator Programme entrant
- CO = College Accelerator Programme entrant
- NG = Next Gen Accelerator Program entrant
- w/o = Walkover
- r = Retired
- d = Defaulted

=== First qualifier ===
First round
(Australia) Tony Dawson	6	4	7
(Argentina) Juan-Carlos Santiago	4	6	5
(Ecuador) Ricardo Ycaza	6	6
(South Africa) Bob Hewitt	3	2

Second round
(Venezuela) Jorge Andrew	6	3	6
(Australia) Trevor Little	1	6	4
(Australia) Tony Dawson
(New Zealand) Chris Lewis	w/o
(France) Patrice Beust	6	6
(Romania) Mihai Tabaras	1	1
(Ecuador) Ricardo Ycaza	7	6
(Netherlands) Paul van Min	6	4

Third round
(Venezuela) Jorge Andrew	6	6
(Australia) Tony Dawson	3	3
(France) Patrice Beust	6	6	6
(Ecuador) Ricardo Ycaza	7	1	2

Qualifying competition
(Venezuela) Jorge Andrew	3	4
(France) Patrice Beust	6	6

=== Second qualifier ===
First round
(Japan) Yuji Tezuka	6	6
(Israel) Felix Kaplan	2	1
(Portugal) Sergio Cruz	6	6
(United States) Chauncey Steele	3	3

Second round
(Romania) Toma Ovici	6	6
(Japan) Nobuya Tamura	2	1
(Japan) Yuji Tezuka	7	4	6
(France) Patrice Hagelauer	5	6	4
(Czechoslovakia) Tomáš Šmíd	6	6
(France) Jean-Loup Rouyer	1	3
(United Kingdom) Martin Robinson
(Portugal) Sergio Cruz	w/o

Third round
(Romania) Toma Ovici	7	6
(Japan) Yuji Tezuka	5	3
(Czechoslovakia) Tomáš Šmíd	6	4	4
(United Kingdom) Martin Robinson	3	6	6

Qualifying competition
(Romania) Toma Ovici	6	6
(United Kingdom) Martin Robinson	2	3

=== Third qualifier ===
First round
(France) Didier Ntz	6	6
(Mexico) Luis Baraldi	4	2

Second round
(West Germany) Rolf Gehring	7	6
(Algeria) Hocine Younes	5	4
(France) Christophe Freyss	6	6
(United States) J Blanchard	3	3
(West Germany) Ulrich Marten	6	6
(France) Didier Ntz	4	4
(Paraguay) Víctor Pecci	6	6
(Romania) Viorel Marcu	2	4

Third round
(West Germany) Rolf Gehring	6	2	6
(France) Christophe Freyss	4	6	4
(West Germany) Ulrich Marten	7	6
(Paraguay) Víctor Pecci	5	4

Qualifying competition
(West Germany) Rolf Gehring	2	6	7
(West Germany) Ulrich Marten	6	4	5

=== Fourth qualifier ===
First round
(Chile) Carlos Feldstedt	6	7
(United States) J Wade	4	6
(Soviet Union) Sergei Grusman	6	4	6
(Italy) Raffaele Cirillo	3	6	3

Second round
(France) Pierre Joly	7	6
(Chile) Carlos Feldstedt	5	2
(France) Gérard Toulon	4	6	6
(United States) Chico Hagey	6	2	4
(Spain) Miguel Mir Rodon	6	6
(Soviet Union) Sergei Grusman	2	4
(Czechoslovakia) Pavel Složil	6	7
(France) Philippe Gruchet	3	5

Third round
(France) Pierre Joly	7	2	7
(France) Gérard Toulon	6	6	5
(Spain) Miguel Mir Rodon	7	3	6
(Czechoslovakia) Pavel Složil	6	6	3

Qualifying competition
(France) Pierre Joly	6	0	1
(Spain) Miguel Mir Rodon	4	6	6

=== Fifth qualifier ===
First round
(Switzerland) Dimitri Sturdza	6	7
(France) Gilles Moretton	4	6

Second round
(France) Régis Brunet	6	6
(Greece) Nicolas Kelaidis	3	3
(Hungary) Róbert Machán	6	6
(France) Alain Bouteleux	3	0
(Italy) Piero Toci	6	7
(France) Guy Rual	4	5
(Switzerland) Dimitri Sturdza	3	7	6
(Egypt) Aly El Dawoudi	6	5	4

Third round
(France) Régis Brunet	7	6
(Hungary) Róbert Machán	6	3
(Italy) Piero Toci	5	6	7
(Switzerland) Dimitri Sturdza	7	3	5

Qualifying competition
(France) Régis Brunet	6	6	4
(Italy) Piero Toci	7	0	6

=== Sixth qualifier ===
First round
(France) Gérard Gay	7	6
(Algeria) Abdeslam Mahmoudi	5	4
(Socialist Federal Republic of Yugoslavia) Dragan Savić	6	6	6
(France) Trevor Allan	3	7	1

Second round
(France) Jean-Louis Haillet	6	6
(Argentina) J Micelli	3	2
(Spain) Juan Ignacio Muntañola	6	6
(France) Gérard Gay	1	1
(Italy) Gianni Ocleppo	6	6
(France) Dominique Bedel	2	1
(Finland) Leo Palin	6	2	8
(Socialist Federal Republic of Yugoslavia) Dragan Savić	2	6	6

Third round
(France) Jean-Louis Haillet	5	4
(Spain) Juan Ignacio Muntañola	7	6
(Italy) Gianni Ocleppo	1	7	7
(Finland) Leo Palin	6	6	5

Qualifying competition
(Spain) Juan Ignacio Muntañola	6	6
(Italy) Gianni Ocleppo	3	4

=== Seventh qualifier ===
First round
(West Germany) Herbert Loerke	4	6	6
(United States) Mike Powers	6	2	4

Second round
(United States) Armistead Neely	6	7
(Italy) Gianluigi Signorini	3	6
(France) Bernard Paul	6	6
(United States) J Meisa	2	1
(France) Jean-Claude Barclay	6	7
(Australia) John Trickey	3	5
(West Germany) Herbert Loerke	2	7	8
(Austria) Peter Pokorny	6	5	6

Third round
(United States) Armistead Neely	6	6
(France) Bernard Paul	1	2
(France) Jean-Claude Barclay	6	6
(West Germany) Herbert Loerke	1	0

Qualifying competition
(United States) Armistead Neely	4	3
(France) Jean-Claude Barclay	6	6

=== Eighth qualifier ===
First round
(Japan) Sachio Kato	6	6
(United States) Cee J	4	2
(Spain) José Castañón	6	6
(Algeria) Sebti Bounaib	0	2

Second round
(Italy) Carlo Borea	6	4	8
(Japan) Sachio Kato	4	6	6
(Japan) Toshiro Sakai	6	7
(Argentina) Miguel Quintin	2	6
(United Kingdom) John Paish	6	6
(France) Eric Plamont	1	1
(France) Jean-Claude Fauvet	1	1
(Spain) José Castañón	6	6

Third round
(Italy) Carlo Borea	7	6
(Japan) Toshiro Sakai	6	3
(United Kingdom) John Paish	4	6	2
(Spain) José Castañón	6	4	6

Qualifying competition
(Italy) Carlo Borea	4	7	3
(Spain) José Castañón	6	6	6

=== Ninth qualifier ===
First round
(United States) Mike Prineas	0	2
(France) Christophe Roger-Vasselin	6	6
(United States) J Rowley	4	3
(United States) J Zouhir	6	6

Second round
(Australia) Alvin Gardiner	3	1
(Monaco) Louis Borfiga	6	6
(Italy) Enzo Vattuone	1	3
(France) Christophe Roger-Vasselin	6	6
(Hungary) János Benyik	4	4
(France) Bernard Fritz	6	6
(United States) J Zouhir	0	2
(France) Michel Leclercq	6	6

Third round
(Monaco) Louis Borfiga	6	6
(France) Christophe Roger-Vasselin	1	2
(France) Bernard Fritz	6	3	6
(France) Michel Leclercq	2	6	2

Qualifying competition
(Monaco) Louis Borfiga	6	6
(France) Bernard Fritz	4	3

=== Tenth qualifier ===
First round
(United States) J Bond	w/o
(Italy) Gianni Marchetti

Second round
(Canada) Richard Legendre	2	6	2
(Italy) Gianni Marchetti	6	4	6
(Argentina) Jorge Todero	3	0
(Poland) Jacek Niedźwiedzki	6	6
(Italy) Pietro Marzano	7	3	3
(France) Bernard Montrenaud	5	6	6
(United States) Mike Machette	2	0
(Argentina) Roberto Graetz	6	6

Third round
(Italy) Gianni Marchetti	3	6	4
(Poland) Jacek Niedźwiedzki	6	4	6
(France) Bernard Montrenaud	3	7	0
(Argentina) Roberto Graetz	6	6	6

Qualifying competition
(Poland) Jacek Niedźwiedzki	4
(Argentina) Roberto Graetz	1^{r}

=== Eleventh qualifier ===
First round
(United States) H. Lofty	1	1
(Romania) Dumitru Hărădău	6	6
(Italy) Fabrizio Fanucci	2	1
(Ecuador) Eduardo Zuleta	6	6

Second round
(Chile) Patricio Rodríguez	6	4
(France) Hervé Gauvain	7	6
(Canada) Réjean Genois	3	3
(Romania) Dumitru Hărădău	6	6
(France) Thierry Bernasconi	7	3	4
(Ecuador) Eduardo Zuleta	6	6	6
(United States) Ben Bishop	1	0
(Argentina) Ricardo Cano	6	6

Third round
(France) Hervé Gauvain	4	6	6
(Romania) Dumitru Hărădău	6	4	3
(Ecuador) Eduardo Zuleta	2	3
(Argentina) Ricardo Cano	6	6

Qualifying competition
(France) Hervé Gauvain	6	3	3
(Argentina) Ricardo Cano	4	6	6

=== Twelfth qualifier ===
First round
(South Africa) Mervyn Webster	1	4
(Romania) Viorel Sotiriu	6	6

Second round
(Hungary) Géza Varga	4	6	2
(Romania) Viorel Sotiriu	6	0	6
(United States) Frank Froehling	6	4	1
(Brazil) Fernando Gentil	4	6	6
(Italy) Vittorio Crotta	4	3
(Argentina) Tierry Quintin	6	6
(France) Jérôme Vanier	6	3	2
(Australia) Bob Rheinberger	3	6	6

Third round
(Romania) Viorel Sotiriu	2	3
(Brazil) Fernando Gentil	6	6
(Argentina) Tierry Quintin	4	7	5
(Australia) Bob Rheinberger	6	5	7

Qualifying competition
(Brazil) Fernando Gentil	5	3
(Australia) Bob Rheinberger	7	6

=== Thirteenth qualifier ===
First round
(France) Thibaut Kuentz	4	3
(Bulgaria) Bozhidar Pampoulov	6	6
(United States) J Fernandez	7	5	2
(Romania) Sever Mureșan	5	7	6
(France) Philippe Couson	3	1
(United States) Rand Evett	6	6

Second round
(Bulgaria) Bozhidar Pampoulov	6	4	4
(Romania) Sever Mureșan	3	6	6
(Argentina) Roberto Aubone	0	1
(Hungary) Szabolcs Baranyi	6	6
(Spain) Javier Soler	6	5^{r}
(France) Maurice Claitte	2	0
(United States) Rand Evett	6	4	6
(South Africa) David Schneider	4	6	8

Third round
(Romania) Sever Mureșan	3	6
(Hungary) Szabolcs Baranyi	6	7
(France) Maurice Claitte	6	6
(South Africa) David Schneider	4	4

Qualifying competition
(Hungary) Szabolcs Baranyi	7	6
(France) Maurice Claitte	5	3

=== Fourteenth qualifier ===
First round
(France) Philippe Seghers	3	0
(Brazil) Carlos Kirmayr	6	6

Second round
(United States) Spencer Segura	1	2
(Brazil) Carlos Kirmayr	6	6
(United States) J Paz	2	3
(France) Jean-Paul Meyer	6	6
(Spain) José García Requena	6	2
(Morocco) Omar Laimina	7	6
(India) Sashi Menon	4	4
(France) François Pierson	6	6

Third round
(Brazil) Carlos Kirmayr	6	6
(France) Jean-Paul Meyer	3	3
(Morocco) Omar Laimina	2	6	6
(France) François Pierson	6	3	4

Qualifying competition
(Brazil) Carlos Kirmayr	2	6	9
(Morocco) Omar Laimina	6	3	7

=== Fifteenth qualifier ===
First round
(United States) J Anpagoumain	1	3
(Brazil) Luis-Felipe Tavares	6	6
(United States) J Reynolds	5	0
(Brazil) Octavio Piva	7	6

Second round
(France) Jacques Thamin	3	5
(Brazil) Luis-Felipe Tavares	6	7
(Bolivia) Eduardo Gorostiaga	6	2	3
(Soviet Union) Anatoli Volkov	3	6	6
(Brazil) Octavio Piva	0	4
(Spain) Ángel Giménez	6	6
(Monaco) Bernard Balleret	6	2	1
(Australia) Peter Doerner	1	6	6

Third round
(Brazil) Luis-Felipe Tavares	6	3	0
(Soviet Union) Anatoli Volkov	4	6	6
(Spain) Ángel Giménez	6	6
(Australia) Peter Doerner	3	2

Qualifying competition
(Soviet Union) Anatoli Volkov	6	6
(Spain) Ángel Giménez	0	4

=== Sixteenth qualifier ===
First round

Second round
(Italy) Franco Bartoni	6	1	2
(Bulgaria) Matei Pampoulov	3	6	6
(United States) Dean Martin	0	0
(Romania) Ionel Santeiu	6	6
(Poland) Tadeusz Nowicki	3	1
(Mexico) Emilio Montaño	6	6
(Argentina) Francisco Mastelli	2	1
(France) Jean-Pierre Courcol	6	6

Third round
(Bulgaria) Matei Pampoulov	1	6	4
(Romania) Ionel Santeiu	6	4	6
(Mexico) Emilio Montaño	6	3	10
(France) Jean-Pierre Courcol	4	6	8

Qualifying competition
(Romania) Ionel Santeiu	7	6
(Mexico) Emilio Montaño	6	4
