= 1975 in tennis =

This page covers all the important events in the sport of tennis in 1975. It provides the results of notable tournaments throughout the year on both the men's and the women's tennis circuits.

== Australian Open ==
Category	Champion(s)	Finalist(s)	Score
Men's singles	(Australia) John Newcombe	(United States) Jimmy Connors	7–5, 3–6, 6–4, 7–6^{(9–7)} (Note: It was Newcombe's 7th and last career Grand Slam singles title and his 2nd title at the Australian Open.)
Women's singles	(Australia) Evonne Goolagong	(Czechoslovakia) Martina Navratilova	6–3, 6–2 (Note: It was Goolagong Cawley's 4th career Grand Slam singles title and her 2nd title at the Australian Open.)
Men's doubles	(Australia) John Alexander (Australia) Philip Dent	(Australia) Bob Carmichael (Australia) Allan Stone	6–3, 7–6 (Note: It was Alexander's 1st career Grand Slam doubles title.) (Note: It was Dent's 1st and only career Grand Slam doubles title.)
Women's doubles	(Australia) Evonne Goolagong (United States) Peggy Michel	(Soviet Union) Olga Morozova (Australia) Margaret Court	7–6, 7–6 (Note: It was Goolagong 4th career Grand Slam doubles title and her 3rd title at the Australian Open.) (Note: It was Michel's 3rd and last career Grand Slam doubles title and her 2nd title at the Australian Open.)
Mixed doubles	No competition between 1970 and 1986.		

== French Open ==
Category	Champion(s)	Finalist(s)	Score
Men's singles	(Sweden) Björn Borg	(Argentina) Guillermo Vilas	6–2, 6–3, 6–4 (Note: It was Borg's 2nd career Grand Slam title, and his 2nd (consecutive) French Open title.)
Women's singles	(United States) Chris Evert	(Czechoslovakia) Martina Navratilova	2–6, 6–2, 6–1 (Note: It was Evert's 3rd career Grand Slam title, and her 2nd (consecutive) French Open title.)
Men's doubles	(United States) Brian Gottfried (Mexico) Raúl Ramírez	(Australia) John Alexander (Australia) Phil Dent	6–4, 2–6, 6–2, 6–4
Women's doubles	(United States) Chris Evert (Czechoslovakia) Martina Navratilova	(United States) Julie Anthony (Soviet Union) Olga Morozova	6–3, 6–2
Mixed doubles	(Uruguay) Fiorella Bonicelli (Brazil) Thomaz Koch	(United States) Pam Teeguarden (Chile) Jaime Fillol	6–4, 7–6

== Wimbledon ==
Category	Champion(s)	Finalist(s)	Score
Men's singles	(United States) Arthur Ashe	(United States) Jimmy Connors	6–1, 6–1, 5–7, 6–4 (Note: It was Ashe's 3rd (and last) career Grand Slam title, and his 1st Wimbledon title.)
Women's singles	(United States) Billie Jean King	(Australia) Evonne Goolagong Cawley	6–0, 6–1 (Note: It was King's 12th (and last) career Grand Slam title (her 8th in the Open Era), and her 6th Wimbledon title.)
Men's doubles	(United States) Vitas Gerulaitis (United States) Sandy Mayer	(Rhodesia) Colin Dowdeswell (Australia) Allan Stone	7–5, 8–6, 6–4
Women's doubles	(United States) Ann Kiyomura (Japan) Kazuko Sawamatsu	(France) Françoise Dürr (Netherlands) Betty Stöve	7–5, 1–6, 7–5
Mixed doubles	(United States) Marty Riessen (Australia) Margaret Court	(Australia) Allan Stone (Netherlands) Betty Stöve	6–4, 7–5

== US Open ==
Category	Champion(s)	Finalist(s)	Score
Men's singles	(Spain) Manuel Orantes	(United States) Jimmy Connors	6–4, 6–3, 6–3 (Note: It was Orantes's only career Grand Slam title.)
Women's singles	(United States) Chris Evert	(Australia) Evonne Goolagong	5–7, 6–4, 6–2 (Note: It was Evert's 4th career Grand Slam title, and her 1st US Open title.)
Men's doubles	(United States) Jimmy Connors (Romania) Ilie Năstase	(Netherlands) Tom Okker (United States) Marty Riessen	6–4, 7–6
Women's doubles	(Australia) Margaret Court (United Kingdom) Virginia Wade	(United States) Rosemary Casals (United States) Billie Jean King	7–5, 2–6, 7–6
Mixed doubles	(United States) Rosemary Casals (United States) Dick Stockton	(United States) Billie Jean King (Australia) Fred Stolle	6-3, 6-7, 6-3
