= 1975 Federation Cup (tennis) =

International women's tennis competition

Details
- Duration: 5–11 May
- Edition: 13th

Champion
- Winning nation: Czechoslovakia

The 1975 Federation Cup was the 13th edition of the most important competition between national teams in women's tennis. 31 nations participated in the tournament, which was held at the Aixoise C.C., Aix-en-Provence, France, from 5–11 May. Czechoslovakia defeated Australia in the final, giving Czechoslovakia their first title.

== Participating teams ==
Participating teams
Argentina	Australia	Austria	Belgium	Brazil	Bulgaria	Canada	Czechoslovakia
Denmark	France	Great Britain	Hungary	Indonesia	Ireland	Israel	Italy
Japan	Luxembourg	Netherlands	New Zealand	Norway	Rhodesia	Romania	South Africa
Spain	Sweden	Switzerland	United States	Uruguay	West Germany	Yugoslavia	

== Draw ==
All ties were played at the Aixoise C.C., Aix-en-Provence, France, on clay courts.|}

First Round
Israel	1
Belgium	2
Luxembourg	0
Romania	3
Brazil	0
Italy	3
South Africa	2
Norway	0
Canada	0
Japan	2
New Zealand	0
Sweden	3
Switzerland	0
United States	3
Great Britain	3
Austria	0
Spain
Rhodesia	w/o
France	3
Bulgaria	0
Indonesia	0
Hungary	2
Czechoslovakia	3
Ireland	0
Uruguay	1
Netherlands	2
Yugoslavia	0
Argentina	2
Denmark	0
West Germany	2

Second Round
Australia	2
Belgium	0
Romania	1
Italy	2
South Africa	2
Japan	1
Sweden	1
United States	2
Great Britain	2
Spain	0
France	2
Hungary	1
Czechoslovakia	2
Netherlands	0
Argentina	1
West Germany	2

Quarterfinals
Australia	3
Italy	0
South Africa	1
United States	2
Great Britain	1
France	2
Czechoslovakia	2
West Germany	1

Semifinals
Australia	2
United States	1
France	0
Czechoslovakia	3

Final
Australia	0
Czechoslovakia	3

1st and 2nd Round losing teams play in Consolation rounds

=== First round ===
==== Israel vs. Belgium ====
Israel
1
Aixoise C.C., Aix-en-Provence, France
May 1975
Red clay (outdoor)

Belgium
2

			1	2	3
1	(Israel) (Belgium)	Paulina Peisachov; Michele Gurdal	3; 6	6; 4	8; 6
2	(Israel) (Belgium)	Janine Strauss; Monique Van Haver	3; 6	1; 6
3	(Israel) (Belgium)	Paulina Peisachov / Janine Strauss; Michele Gurdal / Monique Van Haver	2; 6	1; 6

==== Luxembourg vs. Romania ====
Luxembourg
0
Aixoise C.C., Aix-en-Provence, France
May 1975
Red clay (outdoor)

Romania
3

			1	2	3
1	(Luxembourg) (Romania)	Flore Wagner; Mariana Simionescu	3; 6	4; 6
2	(Luxembourg) (Romania)	Monique Krecke; Florența Mihai	1; 6	0; 6
3	(Luxembourg) (Romania)	Flore Wagner / Simone Wolter; Virginia Ruzici / Mariana Simionescu	1; 6	6; 8

==== Brazil vs. Italy ====
Brazil
0
Aixoise C.C., Aix-en-Provence, France
May 1975
Red clay (outdoor)

Italy
3

			1	2	3
1	(Brazil) (Italy)	Cristina Ribeiro Britto; Daniela Marzano	0; 6	1; 6
2	(Brazil) (Italy)	Patricia Medrado; Rosalba Vido	8; 6	2; 6	1; 6
3	(Brazil) (Italy)	Wanda Ferraz / Marilla Matte; Lucia Bassi / Lea Pericoli	4; 6	2; 6

==== South Africa vs. Norway ====
South Africa
2
Aixoise C.C., Aix-en-Provence, France
May 1975
Red clay (outdoor)

Norway
0

			1	2	3
1	(South Africa) (Norway)	Ilana Kloss; Ellen Grindvold	4; 6	6; 2	6; 4
2	(South Africa) (Norway)	Linky Boshoff; Bente Kjolstad	7; 5	6; 1
3	(South Africa) (Norway)					not played

==== Canada vs. Japan ====
Canada
1
Aixoise C.C., Aix-en-Provence, France
May 1975
Red clay (outdoor)

Japan
2

			1	2	3
1	(Canada) (Japan)	Susan Stone; Kazuko Sawamatsu	3; 6	3; 6
2	(Canada) (Japan)	Jane O'Hara; Toshiko Sade	6; 0	9; 7
3	(Canada) (Japan)	Andrée Martin / Jane O'Hara; Kayoko Fukuoka / Kazuko Sawamatsu	2; 6	0; 6

==== New Zealand vs. Sweden ====
New Zealand
0
Aixoise C.C., Aix-en-Provence, France
May 1975
Red clay (outdoor)

Sweden
3

			1	2	3
1	(New Zealand) (Sweden)	Judy Chaloner; Helena Anliot	4; 6	0; 6
2	(New Zealand) (Sweden)	Pauline Elliott; Ingrid Bentzer	2; 6	1; 6
3	(New Zealand) (Sweden)	Judy Chaloner / Chris Newton; Ingrid Bentzer / Mimmi Wikstedt	1; 6	3; 6

==== Switzerland vs. United States ====
Switzerland
0
Aixoise C.C., Aix-en-Provence, France
May 1975
Red clay (outdoor)

United States
3

			1	2	3
1	(Switzerland) (United States)	Evagreth Emmenegger; Julie Heldman	2; 6	0; 6
2	(Switzerland) (United States)	Marianne Kindler; Kathy Kuykendall	0; 6	0; 6
3	(Switzerland) (United States)	Susi Eichenberger / Evagreth Emmenegger; Julie Heldman / Janet Newberry	3; 6	1; 6

==== Great Britain vs. Austria ====
Great Britain
3
Aixoise C.C., Aix-en-Provence, France
May 1975
Red clay (outdoor)

Austria
0

			1	2	3
1	(United Kingdom) (Austria)	Virginia Wade; Veronika Buche	6; 1	6; 2
2	(United Kingdom) (Austria)	Sue Barker; Sabine Bernegger	6; 3	6; 2
3	(United Kingdom) (Austria)	Sue Barker / Glynis Coles; Sabine Bernegger / Veronika Buche	6; 3	6; 1

==== France vs. Bulgaria ====
France
3
Aixoise C.C., Aix-en-Provence, France
May 1975
Red clay (outdoor)

Bulgaria
0

			1	2	3
1	(France) (Bulgaria)	Gail Benedetti; Lubomira Radkova	6; 1	6; 2
2	(France) (Bulgaria)	Nathalie Fuchs; Khristina Sotirova	6; 3	6; 2
3	(France) (Bulgaria)	Rosy Darmon / Florence Guédy; Diana Moskova / Lubomira Radkova	6; 3	6; 1

==== Indonesia vs. Hungary ====
Indonesia
0
Aixoise C.C., Aix-en-Provence, France
May 1975
Red clay (outdoor)

Hungary
2

			1	2	3
1	(Indonesia) (Hungary)	Lany Kaligis; Éva Szabó	6; 4	2; 6	1; 6
2	(Indonesia) (Hungary)	Lita Sugiarto; Beatrix Klein	6; 2	3; 6	9; 11
3	(Indonesia) (Hungary)					not played

==== Czechoslovakia vs. Ireland ====
Czechoslovakia
3
Aixoise C.C., Aix-en-Provence, France
May 1975
Red clay (outdoor)

Ireland
0

			1	2	3
1	(Czechoslovakia) (Republic of Ireland)	Martina Navrátilová; Geraldine Barniville	6; 1	6; 0
2	(Czechoslovakia) (Republic of Ireland)	Renáta Tomanová; Helen Lennon	6; 2	6; 2
3	(Czechoslovakia) (Republic of Ireland)	Martina Navrátilová / Renáta Tomanová; Geraldine Barniville / Helen Lennon	6; 3	6; 0

==== Uruguay vs. Netherlands ====
Uruguay
1
Aixoise C.C., Aix-en-Provence, France
May 1975
Red clay (outdoor)

Netherlands
2

			1	2	3
1	(Uruguay) (Netherlands)	Fiorella Bonicelli; Marijke Schaar	6; 4	6; 2
2	(Uruguay) (Netherlands)	Carla Guarino de Galeazzi; Elly Appel	0; 6	1; 6
3	(Uruguay) (Netherlands)	Fiorella Bonicelli / Carla Guarino de Galeazzi; Elly Appel / Tine Zwaan	1; 6	5; 7

==== Yugoslavia vs. Argentina ====
Yugoslavia
0
Aixoise C.C., Aix-en-Provence, France
May 1975
Red clay (outdoor)

Argentina
2

			1	2	3
1	(Socialist Federal Republic of Yugoslavia) (Argentina)	Dora Alavantić; Beatriz Araujo	0; 6	0; 6
2	(Socialist Federal Republic of Yugoslavia) (Argentina)	Mima Jaušovec; Raquel Giscafré	4; 6	6; 3	2; 6
3	(Socialist Federal Republic of Yugoslavia) (Argentina)					not played

==== Denmark vs. West Germany ====
Denmark
0
Aixoise C.C., Aix-en-Provence, France
May 1975
Red clay (outdoor)

West Germany
2

			1	2	3
1	(Denmark) (West Germany)	Anne-Mette Sorensen; Helga Masthoff	3; 6	2; 6
2	(Denmark) (West Germany)	Helle Sparre; Katja Ebbinghaus	5; 7	1; 6
3	(Denmark) (West Germany)					not played

=== Second round ===
==== Australia vs. Belgium ====
Australia
2
Aixoise C.C., Aix-en-Provence, France
May 1975
Red clay (outdoor)

Belgium
0

			1	2	3
1	(Australia) (Belgium)	Evonne Goolagong; Michele Gurdal	6; 0	6; 2
2	(Australia) (Belgium)	Helen Gourlay; Monique Van Haver	6; 1	6; 0
3	(Australia) (Belgium)					not played

==== Romania vs. Italy ====
Romania
1
Aixoise C.C., Aix-en-Provence, France
May 1975
Red clay (outdoor)

Italy
2

			1	2	3
1	(Romania) (Italy)	Mariana Simionescu; Rosalba Vido	2; 6	6; 4	4; 6
2	(Romania) (Italy)	Florența Mihai; Daniela Marzano	2; 6	1; 6
3	(Romania) (Italy)	Virginia Ruzici / Mariana Simionescu; Lucia Bassi / Manuela Zoni	6; 4	6; 3

==== South Africa vs. Japan ====
South Africa
2
Aixoise C.C., Aix-en-Provence, France
May 1975
Red clay (outdoor)

Japan
1

			1	2	3
1	(South Africa) (Japan)	Ilana Kloss; Kazuko Sawamatsu	1; 6	3; 6
2	(South Africa) (Japan)	Linky Boshoff; Toshiko Sade	6; 3	6; 2
3	(South Africa) (Japan)	Linky Boshoff / Ilana Kloss; Kayoko Fukuoka / Kazuko Sawamatsu	7; 5	6; 1

==== Sweden vs. United States ====
Sweden
1
Aixoise C.C., Aix-en-Provence, France
May 1975
Red clay (outdoor)

United States
2

			1	2	3
1	(Sweden) (United States)	Helena Anliot; Julie Heldman	6; 4	6; 3
2	(Sweden) (United States)	Ingrid Bentzer; Kathy Kuykendall	2; 6	6; 1	3; 6
3	(Sweden) (United States)	Ingrid Bentzer / Mimmi Wikstedt; Julie Heldman / Janet Newberry	6; 5	5; 7	6; 8

==== Great Britain vs. Spain ====
Great Britain
2
Aixoise C.C., Aix-en-Provence, France
May 1975
Red clay (outdoor)

Spain
0

			1	2	3
1	(United Kingdom) (Spain)	Virginia Wade; Carmen Perea	6; 1	6; 3
2	(United Kingdom) (Spain)	Glynis Coles; Vicky Baldovinos	6; 2	6; 3
3	(United Kingdom) (Spain)					not played

==== France vs. Hungary ====
France
2
Aixoise C.C., Aix-en-Provence, France
May 1975
Red clay (outdoor)

Hungary
1

			1	2	3
1	(France) (Hungary)	Gail Benedetti; Éva Szabó	6; 0	2; 6	6; 8
2	(France) (Hungary)	Nathalie Fuchs; Beatrix Klein	2; 6	6; 3	6; 3
3	(France) (Hungary)	Gail Benedetti / Rosy Darmon; Beatrix Klein / Éva Szabó	7; 5	6; 2

==== Czechoslovakia vs. Netherlands ====
Czechoslovakia
2
Aixoise C.C., Aix-en-Provence, France
May 1975
Red clay (outdoor)

Netherlands
0

			1	2	3
1	(Czechoslovakia) (Netherlands)	Martina Navrátilová; Marijke Schaar	6; 2	1; 0		retired
2	(Czechoslovakia) (Netherlands)	Renáta Tomanová; Elly Appel	6; 2	6; 3
3	(Czechoslovakia) (Netherlands)					not played

==== Argentina vs. West Germany ====
Argentina
1
Aixoise C.C., Aix-en-Provence, France
May 1975
Red clay (outdoor)

West Germany
2

			1	2	3
1	(Argentina) (West Germany)	Beatriz Araujo; Katja Ebbinghaus	2; 6	2; 6
2	(Argentina) (West Germany)	Raquel Giscafré; Helga Masthoff	2; 6	6; 4	6; 3
3	(Argentina) (West Germany)	Beatriz Araujo / Raquel Giscafré; Katja Ebbinghaus / Helga Masthoff	2; 6	6; 1	5; 7

=== Quarterfinals ===
==== Australia vs. Italy ====
Australia
3
Aixoise C.C., Aix-en-Provence, France
May 1975
Red clay (outdoor)

Italy
0

			1	2	3
1	(Australia) (Italy)	Helen Gourlay; Daniela Marzano	6; 4	6; 3
2	(Australia) (Italy)	Evonne Goolagong; Rosalba Vido	6; 2	6; 0
3	(Australia) (Italy)	Dianne Fromholtz / Helen Gourlay; Lucia Bassi / Daniela Marzano	6; 1	7; 9	7; 5

==== South Africa vs. United States ====
South Africa
1
Aixoise C.C., Aix-en-Provence, France
May 1975
Red clay (outdoor)

United States
2

			1	2	3
1	(South Africa) (United States)	Ilana Kloss; Julie Heldman	5; 7	1; 6
2	(South Africa) (United States)	Linky Boshoff; Kathy Kuykendall	0; 6	7; 5	6; 4
3	(South Africa) (United States)	Brigitte Cuypers / Ilana Kloss; Julie Heldman / Janet Newberry	1; 6	4; 6

==== Great Britain vs. France ====
Great Britain
1
Aixoise C.C., Aix-en-Provence, France
May 1975
Red clay (outdoor)

France
2

			1	2	3
1	(United Kingdom) (France)	Virginia Wade; Gail Benedetti	6; 3	6; 3
2	(United Kingdom) (France)	Sue Barker; Nathalie Fuchs	1; 6	6; 1	4; 6
3	(United Kingdom) (France)	Glynis Coles / Virginia Wade; Gail Benedetti / Rosy Darmon	6; 3	1; 6	2; 6

==== Czechoslovakia vs. West Germany ====
Czechoslovakia
2
Aixoise C.C., Aix-en-Provence, France
May 1975
Red clay (outdoor)

West Germany
1

			1	2	3
1	(Czechoslovakia) (West Germany)	Renáta Tomanová; Katja Ebbinghaus	6; 2	2; 6	4; 6
2	(Czechoslovakia) (West Germany)	Martina Navrátilová; Helga Masthoff	6; 3	6; 2
3	(Czechoslovakia) (West Germany)	Martina Navrátilová / Renáta Tomanová; Katja Ebbinghaus / Helga Masthoff	7; 5	6; 1

=== Semifinals ===
==== Australia vs. United States ====
Australia
2
Aixoise C.C., Aix-en-Provence, France
11 May 1975
Red clay (outdoor)

United States
1

			1	2	3
1	(Australia) (United States)	Evonne Goolagong; Julie Heldman	6; 3	6; 3
2	(Australia) (United States)	Helen Gourlay; Kathy Kuykendall	5; 7	4; 6
3	(Australia) (United States)	Evonne Goolagong / Helen Gourlay; Julie Heldman / Janet Newberry	11; 9	6; 1

==== France vs. Czechoslovakia ====
France
0
Aixoise C.C., Aix-en-Provence, France
11 May 1975
Red clay (outdoor)

Czechoslovakia
3

			1	2	3
1	(France) (Czechoslovakia)	Gail Benedetti; Martina Navrátilová	3; 6	2; 6
2	(France) (Czechoslovakia)	Nathalie Fuchs; Renáta Tomanová	3; 6	6; 3	4; 6
3	(France) (Czechoslovakia)	Gail Benedetti / Rosy Darmon; Martina Navrátilová / Renáta Tomanová	4; 6	3; 6

=== Final ===
==== Australia vs. Czechoslovakia ====
Australia
0
Aixoise C.C., Aix-en-Provence, France
11 May 1975
Red clay (outdoor)

Czechoslovakia
3

			1	2	3
1	(Australia) (Czechoslovakia)	Helen Gourlay; Renáta Tomanová	4; 6	2; 6
2	(Australia) (Czechoslovakia)	Evonne Goolagong; Martina Navrátilová	3; 6	4; 6
3	(Australia) (Czechoslovakia)	Dianne Fromholtz / Helen Gourlay; Martina Navrátilová / Renáta Tomanová	3; 6	1; 6

1975 Federation Cup Champions
(Czechoslovakia)
Czechoslovakia
First title

== Consolation rounds ==
=== Draw ===
Consolation first round
Yugoslavia	1
Belgium	2
Uruguay	2
Ireland	0
Indonesia	2
Bulgaria	0
Rhodesia	w/o
Austria
Luxembourg	1
Brazil	2
New Zealand	2
Switzerland	1
Norway	0
Canada	2

Consolation second round
Denmark	0
Belgium	2
Romania	2
Uruguay	1
Sweden	1
Indonesia	2
Japan	2
Austria	0
Israel
Argentina	w/o
Brazil	0
Netherlands	2
New Zealand	0
Hungary	2
Canada
Spain	w/o

Consolation quarterfinals
Belgium	2
Romania	0
Indonesia	1
Japan	2
Argentina	w/o
Netherlands
Hungary	2
Canada	0

Consolation semifinals
Belgium	0
Japan	2
Netherlands	1
Hungary	2

Consolation final
Japan	2
Hungary	1

=== First round ===
==== Yugoslavia vs. Belgium ====
Yugoslavia
1
Aixoise C.C., Aix-en-Provence, France
May 1975
Red clay (outdoor)

Belgium
2

		1	2	3
1	(Socialist Federal Republic of Yugoslavia) (Belgium)
2	(Socialist Federal Republic of Yugoslavia) (Belgium)
3	(Socialist Federal Republic of Yugoslavia) (Belgium)

==== Uruguay vs. Ireland ====
Uruguay
2
Aixoise C.C., Aix-en-Provence, France
May 1975
Red clay (outdoor)

Ireland
0

		1	2	3
1	(Uruguay) (Republic of Ireland)
2	(Uruguay) (Republic of Ireland)
3	(Uruguay) (Republic of Ireland)

==== Indonesia vs. Bulgaria ====
Indonesia
2
Aixoise C.C., Aix-en-Provence, France
May 1975
Red clay (outdoor)

Bulgaria
0

		1	2	3
1	(Indonesia) (Bulgaria)
2	(Indonesia) (Bulgaria)
3	(Indonesia) (Bulgaria)

==== Luxembourg vs. Brazil ====
Luxembourg
1
Aixoise C.C., Aix-en-Provence, France
May 1975
Red clay (outdoor)

Brazil
2

			1	2	3
1	(Luxembourg) (Brazil)	Flore Wagner; Cristina Ribeiro Britto	9; 7	6; 4
2	(Luxembourg) (Brazil)	Monique Krecke; Wanda Ferraz	1; 6	4; 6
3	(Luxembourg) (Brazil)	Monique Krecke / Flore Wagner; Patricia Medrado / Cristina Ribeiro Britto	1; 6	4; 6

==== New Zealand vs. Switzerland ====
New Zealand
2
Aixoise C.C., Aix-en-Provence, France
May 1975
Red clay (outdoor)

Switzerland
1

		1	2	3
1	(New Zealand) (Switzerland)
2	(New Zealand) (Switzerland)
3	(New Zealand) (Switzerland)

==== Norway vs. Canada ====
Norway
0
Aixoise C.C., Aix-en-Provence, France
May 1975
Red clay (outdoor)

Canada
2

		1	2	3
1	(Norway) (Canada)
2	(Norway) (Canada)
3	(Norway) (Canada)

=== Second round ===
==== Denmark vs. Belgium ====
Denmark
0
Aixoise C.C., Aix-en-Provence, France
May 1975
Red clay (outdoor)

Belgium
2

			1	2	3
1	(Denmark) (Belgium)	Anne-Mette Sorensen; Michele Gurdal	1; 6	1; 6
2	(Denmark) (Belgium)	Helle Sparre; Monique Van Haver	4; 6	6; 4	1; 6
3	(Denmark) (Belgium)					not played

==== Romania vs. Uruguay ====
Romania
2
Aixoise C.C., Aix-en-Provence, France
May 1975
Red clay (outdoor)

Uruguay
1

		1	2	3
1	(Romania) (Uruguay)
2	(Romania) (Uruguay)
3	(Romania) (Uruguay)

==== Sweden vs. Indonesia ====
Sweden
1
Aixoise C.C., Aix-en-Provence, France
May 1975
Red clay (outdoor)

Indonesia
2

		1	2	3
1	(Sweden) (Indonesia)
2	(Sweden) (Indonesia)
3	(Sweden) (Indonesia)

==== Japan vs. Austria ====
Japan
2
Aixoise C.C., Aix-en-Provence, France
May 1975
Red clay (outdoor)

Austria
0

			1	2	3
1	(Japan) (Austria)	Kazuko Sawamatsu; Sonja Pachta	6; 1	6; 0
2	(Japan) (Austria)	Toshiko Sade; Veronika Buche	6; 3	6; 2
3	(Japan) (Austria)					not played

==== Brazil vs. Netherlands ====
Brazil
1
Aixoise C.C., Aix-en-Provence, France
May 1975
Red clay (outdoor)

Netherlands
2

		1	2	3
1	(Brazil) (Netherlands)
2	(Brazil) (Netherlands)
3	(Brazil) (Netherlands)

==== New Zealand vs. Hungary ====
New Zealand
0
Aixoise C.C., Aix-en-Provence, France
May 1975
Red clay (outdoor)

Hungary
2

			1	2	3
1	(New Zealand) (Hungary)	Judy Chaloner; Éva Szabó	3; 6	6; 1	3; 6
2	(New Zealand) (Hungary)	Pauline Elliott; Beatrix Klein	4; 6	4; 6
3	(New Zealand) (Hungary)					not played

=== Quarterfinals ===
==== Belgium vs. Romania ====
Belgium
2
Aixoise C.C., Aix-en-Provence, France
May 1975
Red clay (outdoor)

Romania
0

			1	2	3
1	(Belgium) (Romania)	Michele Gurdal; Virginia Ruzici	6; 2	6; 3
2	(Belgium) (Romania)	Monique Van Haver; Mariana Simionescu	1; 6	7; 5	6; 2
3	(Belgium) (Romania)					not played

==== Indonesia vs. Japan ====
Indonesia
1
Aixoise C.C., Aix-en-Provence, France
May 1975
Red clay (outdoor)

Japan
2

			1	2	3
1	(Indonesia) (Japan)	Lany Kaligis; Kazuko Sawamatsu	0; 6	0; 6
2	(Indonesia) (Japan)	Lita Sugiarto; Toshiko Sade	6; 0	6; 1
3	(Indonesia) (Japan)	Lany Kaligis / Lita Sugiarto; Kayoko Fukuoka / Kazuko Sawamatsu	3; 6	3; 6

==== Hungary vs. Canada ====
Hungary
2
Aixoise C.C., Aix-en-Provence, France
May 1975
Red clay (outdoor)

Canada
0

			1	2	3
1	(Hungary) (Canada)	Éva Szabó; Jane O'Hara	7; 5	6; 2
2	(Hungary) (Canada)	Beatrix Klein; Andrée Martin	1; 6	6; 2	6; 2
3	(Hungary) (Canada)					not played

=== Semifinals ===
==== Belgium vs. Japan ====
Belgium
0
Aixoise C.C., Aix-en-Provence, France
May 1975
Red clay (outdoor)

Japan
2

			1	2	3
1	(Belgium) (Japan)	Michele Gurdal; Kazuko Sawamatsu	1; 6	4; 6
2	(Belgium) (Japan)	Monique Van Haver; Toshiko Sade	5; 7			retired
3	(Belgium) (Japan)					not played

==== Netherlands vs. Hungary ====
Netherlands
1
Aixoise C.C., Aix-en-Provence, France
May 1975
Red clay (outdoor)

Hungary
2

			1	2	3
1	(Netherlands) (Hungary)	Elly Appel; Éva Szabó	1; 6	2; 6
2	(Netherlands) (Hungary)	Nora Lauteslager; Beatrix Klein	6; 2	6; 2
3	(Netherlands) (Hungary)	Elly Appel / Nora Lauteslager; Beatrix Klein / Éva Szabó	6; 8	3; 6

=== Final ===
==== Japan vs. Hungary ====
Japan
2
Aixoise C.C., Aix-en-Provence, France
May 1975
Red clay (outdoor)

Hungary
1

			1	2	3
1	(Japan) (Hungary)	Kazuko Sawamatsu; Éva Szabó	6; 4	1; 6	6; 3
2	(Japan) (Hungary)	Toshiko Sade; Beatrix Klein	5; 7	2; 6
3	(Japan) (Hungary)	Kayoko Fukuoka / Kazuko Sawamatsu; Éva Szabó / Erzsébet Széll	6; 0	6; 1
