= 1975 French Open – Mixed doubles =

Mixed doubles
- 1975 French Open

Final
- Champions: (Brazil) Thomaz Koch (Uruguay) Fiorella Bonicelli
- Runners-up: (Chile) Jaime Fillol (United States) Pam Teeguarden
- Score: 6–4, 7–6

Details
- Draw: 24
- Seeds: 2

Events
Singles	men	women		boys	girls
Doubles	men	women	mixed	boys	girls
WC Singles	men	women	quad
WC Doubles	men	women	quad
Legends	−45	45+	women
- French Open

Iván Molina and Martina Navratilova were the defending champions, but Navratilova did not compete this year. Molina teamed up with Renáta Tomanová and lost in quarterfinals to runners-up Jaime Fillol and Pam Teeguarden.

Thomaz Koch and Fiorella Bonicelli won the title by defeating Jaime Fillol and Pam Teeguarden 6–4, 7–6 in the final.

== Seeds ==
Both seeds received a bye into the second round.

1. (Socialist Federal Republic of Yugoslavia) Nikola Pilić / (Socialist Federal Republic of Yugoslavia) Mima Jaušovec (semifinals)
2. (Soviet Union) Alex Metreveli / (Soviet Union) Olga Morozova (second round)

== Draw ==
Key

- Q = Qualifier
- WC = Wild card
- LL = Lucky loser
- Alt = Alternate
- ITF = ITF entry
- PR = Protected ranking
- SR = Special ranking
- SE = Special exempt
- JE = Junior exempt
- JR = Junior Accelerator Programme entrant
- CO = College Accelerator Programme entrant
- NG = Next Gen Accelerator Program entrant
- w/o = Walkover
- r = Retired
- d = Defaulted

=== Finals ===
Semifinals
1	(Socialist Federal Republic of Yugoslavia) Nikola Pilić (Socialist Federal Republic of Yugoslavia) Mima Jaušovec	7	5	3
(Brazil) Thomaz Koch (Uruguay) Fiorella Bonicelli	5	7	6
(Chile) Jaime Fillol (United States) Pam Teeguarden	6	6
(Australia) Paul Kronk (Australia) Dianne Fromholtz	2	4

Final
(Brazil) Thomaz Koch (Uruguay) Fiorella Bonicelli	6	7
(Chile) Jaime Fillol (United States) Pam Teeguarden	4	6

=== Top half ===
First round
(Chile) B Prajoux (Chile) Ana María Pinto Bravo	6	6
(United States) P Rowley (United States) L Rowley	3	1
(France) P Dominguez (France) G Chanfreau	6	3	6
(Soviet Union) T Kakulia (Soviet Union) M Kroschina	2	6	0
(France) D Naegelen (France) F Guédy	6	7
(Romania) I Sânteiu (Romania) F Mihai	2	5
(United States) F McNair (Israel) P Peisachov
(Soviet Union) A Volkov (Romania) M Simionescu	w	/	o

Second round
1	(Socialist Federal Republic of Yugoslavia) N Pilić (Socialist Federal Republic of Yugoslavia) M Jaušovec	6	6
(Chile) B Prajoux (Chile) AM Pinto Bravo	4	4
(Venezuela) H Hose (Netherlands) E Appel	6	6	5
(France) P Dominguez (France) G Chanfreau	7	4	7
(Brazil) T Koch (Uruguay) F Bonicelli	6	6
(France) D Naegelen (France) F Guédy	0	1
(France) W N'Godrella (France) N Fuchs	1	5
(Soviet Union) A Volkov (Romania) M Simionescu	6	7

Quarterfinals
1	(Socialist Federal Republic of Yugoslavia) N Pilić (Socialist Federal Republic of Yugoslavia) M Jaušovec	w	/	o
(France) P Dominguez (France) G Chanfreau
(Brazil) T Koch (Uruguay) F Bonicelli	6	6
(Soviet Union) A Volkov (Romania) M Simionescu	1	3

Semifinals
1	(Socialist Federal Republic of Yugoslavia) N Pilić (Socialist Federal Republic of Yugoslavia) M Jaušovec	7	5	3
(Brazil) T Koch (Uruguay) F Bonicelli	5	7	6

=== Bottom half ===
First round
(Argentina) J Ganzábal (Argentina) B Araujo	w	/	o
(France) JB Chanfreau (Argentina) SM Villaverde
(Chile) J Fillol (United States) P Teeguarden	6	7
(Venezuela) J Andrew (Chile) M Rodríguez	1	5
(Sweden) K Johansson (Sweden) H Anliot	4	0
(Chile) P Cornejo (Romania) V Ruzici	6	6
(Argentina) T Vázquez (Argentina) R Giscafré	6	2	8
(Australia) P Kronk (Australia) D Fromholtz	3	6	10

Second round
(Argentina) J Ganzábal (Argentina) B Araujo	0	5
(Colombia) I Molina (Czechoslovakia) R Tomanová	6	7
(Chile) J Fillol (United States) P Teeguarden	w	/	o
(Mexico) M Lara (France) R Darmon
(Chile) P Cornejo (Romania) V Ruzici	6	6
(France) P Beust (Sweden) I Bentzer	3	3
(Australia) P Kronk (Australia) D Fromholtz	6	4	9
2	(Soviet Union) A Metreveli (Soviet Union) O Morozova	3	6	7

Quarterfinals
(Colombia) I Molina (Czechoslovakia) R Tomanová	4	1
(Chile) J Fillol (United States) P Teeguarden	6	6
(Chile) P Cornejo (Romania) V Ruzici	3	6	3
(Australia) P Kronk (Australia) D Fromholtz	6	3	6

Semifinals
(Chile) J Fillol (United States) P Teeguarden	6	6
(Australia) P Kronk (Australia) D Fromholtz	2	4
