= Donna Ganz =

American tennis player

- Country (sports): United States
- Born: November 9, 1954 (age 70)
- Height: 5 ft 2 in (157 cm)

Singles

Grand Slam singles results
- French Open: QF (1975)
- Wimbledon: 1R (1975, 1978)
- US Open: 2R (1975, 1977, 1978)

Doubles

Grand Slam doubles results
- French Open: 2R (1978)
- US Open: 1R (1975)

Donna Ganz (born November 9, 1954) is an American former professional tennis player.

Ganz started playing tennis at the age of 11, and grew up playing on the clay courts at Flamingo Park in Miami Beach, Florida. Ganz was a two-time Orange Bowl 18 and under champion, having won the titles in 1971 and 1972. She also won the Easter Bowl titles in the girls 18 and under in those same years.

Ganz's best performance on tour came at the 1975 French Open, where she had wins over Mariana Simionescu, Rosie Darmon and Dianne Fromholtz, who at the time was a top 10 ranked player in the world. She lost in the quarterfinals to Martina Navratilova.
