= 1975 French Open – Women's doubles =

Women's doubles
- 1975 French Open

Final
- Champions: (United States) Chris Evert (Czechoslovakia) Martina Navratilova
- Runners-up: (United States) Julie Anthony (Soviet Union) Olga Morozova
- Score: 6–3, 6–2

Details
- Seeds: 2

Events
Singles	men	women		boys	girls
Doubles	men	women	mixed	boys	girls
WC Singles	men	women	quad
WC Doubles	men	women	quad
Legends	−45	45+	women
← 1974 ·	French Open	· 1976 →

Defending champion Chris Evert and her partner Martina Navratilova defeated the other defending champion Olga Morozova and her partner Julie Anthony in the final, 6–3, 6–2 to win the women's doubles tennis title at the 1975 French Open.

== Seeds ==
Both seeds received a bye into the second round.

1. (United States) Julie Anthony / (Soviet Union) Olga Morozova (final)
2. (United States) Chris Evert / (Czechoslovakia) Martina Navratilova (champions)

== Draw ==
=== Key ===
- Q = Qualifier
- WC = Wild card
- LL = Lucky loser
- Alt = Alternate
- SE = Special exempt
- PR = Protected ranking
- ITF = ITF entry
- JE = Junior exempt
- w/o = Walkover
- r = Retired
- d = Defaulted
- SR = Special ranking

=== Finals ===
Semifinals
1	(United States) Julie Anthony (Soviet Union) Olga Morozova	7	5	6
(France) Gail Chanfreau (Japan) Kazuko Sawamatsu	6	7	3
(United States) Pam Teeguarden (Czechoslovakia) Renáta Tomanová	1	4
2	(United States) Chris Evert (Czechoslovakia) Martina Navratilova	6	6

Final
1	(United States) Julie Anthony (Soviet Union) Olga Morozova	3	2
2	(United States) Chris Evert (Czechoslovakia) Martina Navratilova	6	6

=== Top half ===
First round
(United States) J Newberry (United States) S Walsh	6	6
(South Africa) L Boshoff (United States) B Nagelsen	4	4
(Argentina) B Araujo (Argentina) E Weisenberger	0	1
(Australia) D Fromholtz (Argentina) R Giscafré	6	6
(Spain) V Baldovinos (Spain) C Perea	4	6	6
(Czechoslovakia) M Neumannová (Israel) P Peisachov	6	1	2

Second round
1	(United States) J Anthony (Soviet Union) O Morozova	6	6
(United States) J Newberry (United States) S Walsh	2	3
(Sweden) H Anliot (Sweden) I Bentzer	5	6	7
(United States) J Evert (United States) L Rowley	7	3	5
(United Kingdom) L Charles (United Kingdom) S Mappin	3	4
(Australia) D Fromholtz (Argentina) R Giscafré	6	6
(France) G Chanfreau (Japan) K Sawamatsu	6	6
(Spain) V Baldovinos (Spain) C Perea	1	0

Quarterfinals
1	(United States) J Anthony (Soviet Union) O Morozova	6	3	6
(Sweden) H Anliot (Sweden) I Bentzer	2	6	1
(Australia) D Fromholtz (Argentina) R Giscafré	3	2
(France) G Chanfreau (Japan) K Sawamatsu	6	6

Semifinals
1	(United States) J Anthony (Soviet Union) O Morozova	7	5	6
(France) G Chanfreau (Japan) K Sawamatsu	6	7	3

=== Bottom half ===
First round
(Netherlands) E Appel (Romania) F Mihai	3	5
(Czechoslovakia) M Koželuhová (Soviet Union) M Kroschina	6	7
(Chile) AM Pinto Bravo (Chile) M Rodríguez	3	0
(France) R Darmon (France) N Fuchs	6	6
(Romania) V Ruzici (Romania) M Simionescu	2	6	8
(United States) D Ganz (Belgium) M Gurdal	6	4	6

Second round
(Czechoslovakia) M Koželuhová (Soviet Union) M Kroschina	6	3	2
(United States) P Teeguarden (Czechoslovakia) R Tomanová	2	6	6
(France) R Darmon (France) N Fuchs	5	6	2
(United Kingdom) S Barker (United Kingdom) G Coles	7	2	6
(Uruguay) F Bonicelli (Socialist Federal Republic of Yugoslavia) M Jaušovec	6	6
(France) F Guédy (Italy) D Marzano	2	3
(Romania) V Ruzici (Romania) M Simionescu	3	0
2	(United States) C Evert (Czechoslovakia) M Navratilova	6	6

Quarterfinals
(United States) P Teeguarden (Czechoslovakia) R Tomanová	6	6
(United Kingdom) S Barker (United Kingdom) G Coles	4	4
(Uruguay) F Bonicelli (Socialist Federal Republic of Yugoslavia) M Jaušovec	7	1	2
2	(United States) C Evert (Czechoslovakia) M Navratilova	5	6	6

Semifinals
(United States) P Teeguarden (Czechoslovakia) R Tomanová	1	4
2	(United States) C Evert (Czechoslovakia) M Navratilova	6	6
