= 1975 French Open – Men's doubles =

Men's doubles
- 1975 French Open

Final
- Champion: (United States) Brian Gottfried (Mexico) Raúl Ramírez
- Runner-up: (Australia) John Alexander (Australia) Phil Dent
- Score: 6–4, 2–6, 6–2, 6–4

Details
- Draw: 43
- Seeds: 4

Events
Singles	men	women		boys	girls
Doubles	men	women	mixed	boys	girls
WC Singles	men	women	quad
WC Doubles	men	women	quad
Legends	−45	45+	women
← 1974 ·	French Open	· 1976 →

Dick Crealy and Onny Parun were the defending champions but competed this year with different partners. Crealy teamed up with Niki Pilić, and lost in the first round to Wojtek Fibak and Balázs Taróczy. Parun teamed up with Željko Franulović, and lost in the second round to Iván Molina and Jairo Velasco.

Brian Gottfried and Raúl Ramírez won in the final 6–4, 2–6, 6–2, 6–4 against John Alexander and Phil Dent.

== Seeds ==
1. (United States) Brian Gottfried / (Mexico) Raúl Ramírez (champions)
2. (Spain) Juan Gisbert / (Spain) Manuel Orantes (semifinals)
3. (Australia) John Alexander / (Australia) Phil Dent (final)
4. (Sweden) Björn Borg / (Argentina) Guillermo Vilas (semifinals)

== Draw ==
=== Key ===
- Q = Qualifier
- WC = Wild card
- LL = Lucky loser
- Alt = Alternate
- ITF = ITF entry
- PR = Protected ranking
- SR = Special ranking
- SE = Special exempt
- JE = Junior exempt
- JR = Junior Accelerator Programme entrant
- CO = College Accelerator Programme entrant
- NG = Next Gen Accelerator Program entrant
- w/o = Walkover
- r = Retired
- d = Defaulted

=== Finals ===
Quarterfinals
2	(Spain) Juan Gisbert (Spain) Manuel Orantes	7	6
(Italy) Paolo Bertolucci (Italy) Adriano Panatta	5	1
(United States) Eddie Dibbs (United States) Harold Solomon	3	3
3	(Australia) John Alexander (Australia) Phil Dent	6	6
4	(Sweden) Björn Borg (Argentina) Guillermo Vilas	7	6
(Chile) Patricio Cornejo (Chile) Jaime Fillol	5	3
(Soviet Union) Alex Metreveli (Romania) Ilie Năstase	3	2
1	(United States) Brian Gottfried (Mexico) Raúl Ramírez	6	6

Semifinals
2	(Spain) Juan Gisbert (Spain) Manuel Orantes	6	4
3	(Australia) John Alexander (Australia) Phil Dent	7	6
4	(Sweden) Björn Borg (Argentina) Guillermo Vilas
1	(United States) Brian Gottfried (Mexico) Raúl Ramírez	w/o

Final
3	(Australia) John Alexander (Australia) Phil Dent	4	6	2	4
1	(United States) Brian Gottfried (Mexico) Raúl Ramírez	6	2	6	6

=== Top half ===
==== Section 1 ====
First round
2	(Spain) J Gisbert (Spain) M Orantes	6	6
(France) R Brunet (France) D Frantz	4	2
(France) J-B Chanfreau (France) J-L Haillet	5	7	3
(Czechoslovakia) F Pála (Czechoslovakia) J Písecký	7	5	6
(United States) J Andrews (United States) R Fisher	6	6
(United States) B Martin (United States) S Segura	4	2

Second round
2	(Spain) J Gisbert (Spain) M Orantes	6	6
(Venezuela) J Andrew (Bolivia) R Benavides	2	1
(Colombia) I Molina (Colombia) J Velasco	6	6
(Socialist Federal Republic of Yugoslavia) Ž Franulović (New Zealand) O Parun	2	4
(Spain) A Muñoz (Spain) JI Muntañola	2	6	6
(Czechoslovakia) F Pála (Czechoslovakia) J Písecký	6	4	2
(Italy) P Bertolucci (Italy) A Panatta	6	6
(United States) J Andrews (United States) R Fisher	2	4

Third round
2	(Spain) J Gisbert (Spain) M Orantes	6	6
(Colombia) I Molina (Colombia) J Velasco	2	4
(Spain) A Muñoz (Spain) JI Muntañola	7	6	1
(Italy) P Bertolucci (Italy) A Panatta	6	7	6

Quarterfinals
2	(Spain) J Gisbert (Spain) M Orantes	7	6
(Italy) P Bertolucci (Italy) A Panatta	5	1

==== Section 2 ====
First round
(Chile) JR Pinto Bravo (Chile) B Prajoux	6	6
(Egypt) A El Dawoudi (Romania) I Sânteiu	4	3
(Czechoslovakia) M Holeček (West Germany) K Meiler	6	6
(France) P Beust (France) D Contet	3	3
Alt	(West Germany) R Gehring (West Germany) U Marten	1	4
3	(Australia) J Alexander (Australia) P Dent	6	6

Second round
(France) P Dominguez (France) F Jauffret	6	6
(Chile) JR Pinto Bravo (Chile) B Prajoux	1	3
(United States) E Dibbs (United States) H Solomon	6	4	6
(France) C Roger-Vasselin (Denmark) T Ulrich	4	6	4
(Egypt) I El Shafei (Brazil) T Koch	6	6	6
(Czechoslovakia) M Holeček (West Germany) K Meiler	1	7	2
(Venezuela) H Hose (Japan) J Kamiwazumi	6	3	2
3	(Australia) J Alexander (Australia) P Dent	4	6	6

Third round
(France) P Dominguez (France) F Jauffret	3	6	6
(United States) E Dibbs (United States) H Solomon	6	1	8
(Egypt) I El Shafei (Brazil) T Koch	2	4
3	(Australia) J Alexander (Australia) P Dent	6	6

Quarterfinals
(United States) E Dibbs (United States) H Solomon	3	3
3	(Australia) J Alexander (Australia) P Dent	6	6

=== Bottom half ===
==== Section 3 ====
First round
(Soviet Union) T Kakulia (Soviet Union) A Volkov	6	6
(Brazil) JE Mandarino (Argentina) T Vázquez	4	0
(Chile) P Cornejo (Chile) J Fillol	6	6
(Sweden) B Andersson (Sweden) T Svensson	0	4

Second round
4	(Sweden) B Borg (Argentina) G Vilas	6	6
(Soviet Union) T Kakulia (Soviet Union) A Volkov	4	2
(Brazil) F Gentil (Brazil) C Kirmayr	4	0
(Czechoslovakia) J Hřebec (Czechoslovakia) J Kodeš	6	6
(Australia) B Carmichael (Australia) C Dibley	6	6
(United States) D Crawford (United States) A Neely	0	1
(Chile) P Cornejo (Chile) J Fillol	6	5	7
(France) J-P Meyer (France) W N'Godrella	2	7	5

Third round
4	(Sweden) B Borg (Argentina) G Vilas	6	4	6
(Czechoslovakia) J Hřebec (Czechoslovakia) J Kodeš	4	6	4
(Australia) B Carmichael (Australia) C Dibley	6	5	8
(Chile) P Cornejo (Chile) J Fillol	3	7	10

Quarterfinals
4	(Sweden) B Borg (Argentina) G Vilas	7	6
(Chile) P Cornejo (Chile) J Fillol	5	3

==== Section 4 ====
First round
(South Africa) R Moore (Rhodesia) A Pattison	6	7
(Argentina) R Cano (Spain) J Castañón	4	5
(Australia) D Crealy (Socialist Federal Republic of Yugoslavia) N Pilić	6	1	4
(Poland) W Fibak (Hungary) B Taróczy	2	6	6
(Argentina) E Álvarez (Argentina) J Ganzábal	6	2	4
(Australia) J James (United States) S Krulevitz	4	6	6

Second round
(South Africa) R Moore (Rhodesia) A Pattison	4	4
(Soviet Union) A Metreveli (Romania) I Năstase	6	6
(Poland) W Fibak (Hungary) B Taróczy	3
(Mexico) M Lara (Mexico) J Loyo Mayo	2^{r}
(France) G Goven (France) P Proisy	2	3
(France) É Deblicker (France) D Naegelen	6	6
(Australia) J James (United States) S Krulevitz	3	3
1	(United States) B Gottfried (Mexico) R Ramírez	6	6

Third round
(Soviet Union) A Metreveli (Romania) I Năstase	6	7
(Poland) W Fibak (Hungary) B Taróczy	4	6
(France) É Deblicker (France) D Naegelen	1	1
1	(United States) B Gottfried (Mexico) R Ramírez	6	6

Quarterfinals
(Soviet Union) A Metreveli (Romania) I Năstase	3	2
1	(United States) B Gottfried (Mexico) R Ramírez	6	6
