= José Castañón =

Spanish tennis player

- Full name: José-Antonio Castañón
- Country (sports): Spain

Singles
- Career record: 3–20
- Highest ranking: No. 147 (1973.08.23)

Grand Slam singles results
- French Open: 1R (1975)

Doubles
- Career record: 1–11

Grand Slam doubles results
- French Open: 1R (1975)

Grand Slam mixed doubles results
- Wimbledon: 1R (1973)

José-Antonio Castañón is a Spanish former professional tennis player.

Castañón competed on the professional tour in the 1970s, reaching a career high singles ranking of 147 in the world. He made his grand slam main draw debut in the mixed doubles at the 1973 Wimbledon Championships and also featured at the 1975 French Open, in the men's singles and doubles main draws.
