= 1975 French Open – Women's singles =

Women's singles
- 1975 French Open

Final
- Champion: (United States) Chris Evert
- Runner-up: (Czechoslovakia) Martina Navratilova
- Score: 2–6, 6–2, 6–1

Details
- Draw: 64
- Seeds: 8

Events
| Singles | men | women | | boys | girls |
| Doubles | men | women | mixed | boys | girls |
| WC Singles | men | women | quad |
| WC Doubles | men | women | quad |
| Legends | −45 | 45+ | women |
- French Open

Defending champion Chris Evert defeated Martina Navratilova in the final, 2–6, 6–2, 6–1 to win the women's singles tennis title at the 1975 French Open. It was her second French Open singles title and her third major singles title overall. The final was the first of 22 meetings at the majors between Evert and Navratilova.

== Seeds ==
The seeded players are listed below. Chris Evert is the champion; others show the round in which they were eliminated.

1. (United States) Chris Evert (champion)
2. (Czechoslovakia) Martina Navratilova (finalist)
3. (Soviet Union) Olga Morozova (semifinals)
  (United States) Julie Heldman (first round)
4. n/a
5. (West Germany) Helga Masthoff (second round)
  (France) Gail Chanfreau (second round)
  (Argentina) Raquel Giscafré (quarterfinals)
  (United States) Janet Newberry (semifinals)
6. n/a
7. n/a
8. n/a

== Draw ==
=== Key ===
- Q = Qualifier
- WC = Wild card
- LL = Lucky loser
- r = Retired

=== Finals ===
Quarterfinals
1 | (United States) Chris Evert | 6 | 6
(Japan) Kazuko Sawamatsu | 2 | 2
3 | (Soviet Union) Olga Morozova | 7 | 6 | 6
5 | (Argentina) Raquel Giscafré | 5 | 7 | 0
5 | (United States) Janet Newberry | 6 | 6
(Hungary) Éva Szabó | 1 | 2
(United States) Donna Ganz | 1 | 1
2 | (Czechoslovakia) Martina Navratilova | 6 | 6

Semifinals
1 | (United States) Chris Evert | 6 | 6
3 | (Soviet Union) Olga Morozova | 4 | 0
5 | (United States) Janet Newberry | 2 | 3
2 | (Czechoslovakia) Martina Navratilova | 6 | 6

Finals
1 | (United States) Chris Evert | 2 | 6 | 6
2 | (Czechoslovakia) Martina Navratilova | 6 | 2 | 1

=== Earlier rounds ===
==== Section 1 ====
First round
(Spain) Perea | 2 | 2
1 | (United States) Evert | 6 | 6
Q | (Italy) Marzano | 4 | 4
(Socialist Federal Republic of Yugoslavia) Jaušovec | 6 | 6
Q | (West Germany) Riedel | 3 | 6 | 2
(Czechoslovakia) Tomanová | 6 | 3 | 6
(Sweden) Anliot | 4 | 1
(Czechoslovakia) Neumannová | 6 | 6
(United Kingdom) Charles | 3 | 0
5 | (France) Chanfreau | 6 | 6
Q | (Romania) Mihai | 3 | 2
(Uruguay) Bonicelli | 6 | 6
(France) Bîmes | 0 | 2
(Japan) Sawamatsu | 6 | 6
(Czechoslovakia) Koželuhová | 3 | 2
Q | (Australia) Paish | 6 | 6

Second round
1 | (United States) Evert | 6 | 6
(Socialist Federal Republic of Yugoslavia) Jaušovec | 2 | 3
(Czechoslovakia) Tomanová | 6 | 6
(Czechoslovakia) Neumannová | 2 | 2
5 | (France) Chanfreau | 4 | 4
(Uruguay) Bonicelli | 6 | 6
(Japan) Sawamatsu | 6 | 3 | 6
Q | (Australia) Paish | 3 | 6 | 3

Third round
1 | (United States) Evert | 6 | 6
(Czechoslovakia) Tomanová | 3 | 2
(Uruguay) Bonicelli | 6 | 3
(Japan) Sawamatsu | 7 | 6

Quarterfinals
1 | (United States) Evert | 6 | 6
(Japan) Sawamatsu | 2 | 2

==== Section 2 ====
First round
LL | (United States) Tenney | 2 | 1
3 | (Soviet Union) Morozova | 6 | 6
(Italy) Nasuelli | 2 | 4
(Romania) Ruzici | 6 | 6
Q | (Argentina) Weisenberger | 2 | 6 | 7
(South Africa) Boshoff | 6 | 4 | 9
(West Germany) Ebbinghaus | 4 | 2
(United Kingdom) Barker | 6 | 6
(Spain) Baldovinos | 7 | 2 | 0
5 | (Argentina) Giscafré | 6 | 6 | 6
(Hungary) Klein | 6 | 3 | 1
(France) Guédy | 2 | 6 | 6
Q | (Sweden) Sandberg | 5 | 2
(United States) Rowley | 7 | 6
(United States) Evert | 4 | 3
(Soviet Union) Kroschina | 6 | 6

Second round
3 | (Soviet Union) Morozova | 6 | 6
(Romania) Ruzici | 2 | 3
(South Africa) Boshoff | 2 | 1
(United Kingdom) Barker | 6 | 6
5 | (Argentina) Giscafré | 6 | 6
(France) Guédy | 1 | 1
(United States) Rowley | 0 | 0
(Soviet Union) Kroschina | 6 | 6

Third round
3 | (Soviet Union) Morozova | 6 | 6
(United Kingdom) Barker | 1 | 0
5 | (Argentina) Giscafré | 6 | 6
(Soviet Union) Kroschina | 2 | 3

Quarterfinals
3 | (Soviet Union) Morozova | 7 | 6 | 6
5 | (Argentina) Giscafré | 5 | 7 | 0

==== Section 3 ====
First round
(Sweden) Bentzer | 7 | 5 | 0
(United States) Anthony | 6 | 7 | 6
(Israel) Peisachov | 4 | 1
(Netherlands) Appel | 6 | 6
(Chile) Pinto Bravo | 1 | 3
(Sweden) Forsgårdh | 6 | 6
(France) Simon | 0 | 4
5 | (United States) Newberry | 6 | 6
Q | (Italy) Rosa | 3 | 4
(Hungary) Szabó | 6 | 6
Q | (United States) Rupert | 2 | 7 | 1
(United States) Nagelsen | 6 | 6 | 6
(United Kingdom) Mappin | 2 | 3
LL | (Chile) Rodríguez | 6 | 6
3 | (United States) Heldman | 5 | 6 | 0
(France) de Roubin | 7 | 4 | 6

Second round
(United States) Anthony | 1 | 0
(Netherlands) Appel | 6 | 6
(Sweden) Forsgårdh | 1 | 4
5 | (United States) Newberry | 6 | 6
(Hungary) Szabó | 6 | 6
(United States) Nagelsen | 3 | 4
LL | (Chile) Rodríguez | 4 | 3
(France) de Roubin | 6 | 6

Third round
(Netherlands) Appel | 3 | 3
5 | (United States) Newberry | 6 | 6
(Hungary) Szabó | 6 | 6
(France) de Roubin | 1 | 4

Quarterfinals
5 | (United States) Newberry | 6 | 6
(Hungary) Szabó | 1 | 2

==== Section 4 ====
First round
(Romania) Simionescu | 4 | 3
(United States) Ganz | 6 | 6
(Italy) Pericoli | 7 | 1 | 3
(France) Darmon | 5 | 6 | 6
(Indonesia) Kaligis | 7 | 1 | 0
(Australia) Fromholtz | 5 | 6 | 6
(United States) Walsh | 1 | 1
5 | (West Germany) Masthoff | 6 | 6
(United Kingdom) Coles | 2 | 6
(United States) Teeguarden | 6 | 7
(Belgium) Gurdal | 6 | 6 | 4
(Indonesia) Sugiarto | 4 | 7 | 6
(Netherlands) Schaar | 4 | 2
(France) Fuchs | 6 | 6
(Argentina) Araujo | 4 | 4
2 | (Czechoslovakia) Navratilova | 6 | 6

Second round
(United States) Ganz | 6 | 6
(France) Darmon | 1 | 1
(Australia) Fromholtz | 3 | 6 | 6
5 | (West Germany) Masthoff | 6 | 1 | 3
(United States) Teeguarden | 4 | 7 | 9
(Indonesia) Sugiarto | 6 | 5 | 7
(France) Fuchs | 5 | 3
2 | (Czechoslovakia) Navratilova | 7 | 6

Third round
(United States) Ganz | 6 | 6
(Australia) Fromholtz | 3 | 4
(United States) Teeguarden | 2 | 6 | 3
2 | (Czechoslovakia) Navratilova | 6 | 2 | 6

Quarterfinals
(United States) Ganz | 1 | 1
2 | (Czechoslovakia) Navratilova | 6 | 6

== See also ==
- Evert–Navratilova rivalry

| Preceded by 1975 Australian Open – Women's singles | Grand Slam women's singles | Succeeded by 1975 Wimbledon Championships – Women's singles |
