= Juan Ignacio Muntañola =

Spanish tennis player

- Full name: Juan Ignacio Muntañola Vilamala
- Country (sports): Spain
- Plays: Right-handed

Singles
- Career record: 19–29
- Highest ranking: No. 101 (12 December 1976)

Grand Slam singles results
- French Open: 2R (1975)
- Wimbledon: 1R (1974)

Doubles
- Career record: 6–23

Grand Slam doubles results
- French Open: 3R (1975)

Juan Ignacio Muntañola Vilamala (Note: In this Spanish name, the first or paternal surname is Muntañola and the second or maternal family name is Vilamala.) is a Spanish former professional tennis player.

A right-handed player, Muntañola competed on the professional tour in the 1970s.

Muntañola, who reached a best ranking of 101 in the world, made his grand slam main draw debut at the 1974 Wimbledon Championships, as a lucky loser from qualifying. He played in three editions of the French Open, including in 1975 when he won through to the second round, where he was beaten by eventual finalist Guillermo Vilas.

== Grand Prix career finals ==
=== Singles: 1 (0–1) ===
| Outcome | No. | Date | Tournament | Surface | Opponent | Score |
|---|---|---|---|---|---|---|
| Runner-up | 1. | 6 October 1975 | Avilés, Spain | Clay | (Socialist Federal Republic of Yugoslavia) Nikola Pilić | 3–6, 4–6, 3–6 |
