= Miguel Mir =

Spanish tennis player (born 1956)

- Country (sports): Spain
- Born: 18 April 1956 (age 69); Barcelona, Spain
- Plays: Right-handed

Singles
- Career record: 6–30
- Career titles: 0
- Highest ranking: No. 158 (26 Dec 1979)

Grand Slam singles results
- French Open: 1R (1975, 1980, 1981)
- Wimbledon: 1R (1980)

Doubles
- Career record: 9–25
- Career titles: 0
- Highest ranking: No. 237 (2 Jan 1984)

Grand Slam doubles results
- French Open: 2R (1981)
Medal record
Mediterranean Games
Silver medal – second place	1975 Algiers	Doubles

Miguel Mir Rodon (born 18 April 1956) is a former professional tennis player from Spain.

== Career ==
Mir made his first Grand Slam appearance at the 1975 French Open, where he was beaten in the opening round by Roger Taylor. He didn't return to the tournament until 1980, when he again made a first round exit, with Brian Gottfried winning in straight sets. A month later he played in the 1980 Wimbledon Championships and lost to Steve Krulevitz in the opening round. His final attempt at registering a win came at the 1981 French Open, but he was beaten once more, this time by Billy Martin. He did however make the second round of the doubles, with partner José López-Maeso. The pair had a win over Jimmy Arias and Ben Testerman.

The Spaniard took part in one Davis Cup tie for his country, in 1981, against Algeria. He teamed up with José López-Maeso in the doubles rubber, to defeat the Algerian pairing of Yassine Amier and Djamel Boudjemline.

== Challenger titles ==
=== Singles: (1) ===
No.	Year	Tournament	Surface	Opponent	Score
1.	1979	Galatina, Italy	Clay	(Chile) Alejandro Pierola	6–1, 7–6
