= Carlos Feldstedt =

Chilean tennis player

- Country (sports): Chile
- Height: 5 ft 4 in (163 cm)

Singles
- Career record: 0–4
- Highest ranking: No. 247 (3 Jun 1974)

Grand Slam singles results
- French Open: Q2 (1975)

Doubles
- Career record: 0–5
- Highest ranking: No. 471 (4 Jan 1981)

Grand Slam doubles results
- US Open: 2R (1974)

Carlos Feldstedt is a Chilean former professional tennis player.

A lightly built player, Feldstedt played collegiate tennis in the United States for Mississippi State University before competing as a professional. He reached a best singles world ranking of 247 and made a doubles main draw appearance at the 1974 US Open. Back in his hometown of Viña del Mar he later founded a tennis club. His son Andrés is the under 18s coach of the Rafa Nadal Academy.
