= Beatriz Araujo =

Argentine tennis player

- Country (sports): Argentina
- Born: 4 July 1955 (age 71) Rio Negro, Brazil

Singles
- Career titles: 2

Grand Slam singles results
- French Open: 1R (1975)
- Wimbledon: 1R (1974)

Grand Slam doubles results
- French Open: 1R (1975)

Grand Slam mixed doubles results
- French Open: 2R (1975)

Beatriz Araujo (born 4 July 1955) is an Argentine former professional tennis player.

Araujo won back to back Argentine Opens in 1969 and 1970. She made her grand slam main draw debut at the 1974 Wimbledon Championships and played a match against Martina Navratilova at the 1975 French Open, which she lost 4–6, 4–6. During her career she featured in a total of 10 Federation Cup ties for Argentina, going 2/4 in singles and 4/4 in doubles.

She is married to former Argentine Davis Cup player Héctor Romani.

== See also ==
- List of Argentina Fed Cup team representatives
