= Jacek Niedźwiedzki =

Polish tennis player (1951–2021)

- Full name: Jacek Niedźwiedzki
- Country (sports): Poland
- Born: 7 June 1951
- Died: 27 October 2021 (aged 70)

Singles
- Career record: 8–9
- Career titles: 0
- Highest ranking: No. 172 (2 July 1977)

Grand Slam singles results
- French Open: 1R (1975)

Doubles
- Career record: 9–9
- Career titles: 1

Jacek Niedźwiedzki (7 June 1951 – 27 October 2021) was a professional tennis player from Poland.

== Career ==
A five-time doubles gold medalist in the Polish Championships, Niedźwiedzki featured in nine ties for the Poland Davis Cup team during the 1970s, for a record of 6 wins from 15 matches. His only main draw appearance in a Grand Slam tournament was at the 1975 French Open when he faced 11th seed Jaime Fillol in the first round. In a best of three set match, he pushed Fillol to a third but was unable to cause the upset. He won a Grand Prix doubles title at Barcelona in 1976. With his partner, Wojciech Fibak, he defeated Colin Dowdeswell and Paul Kronk in the final. In 1977 he was a losing singles finalist in the Zurich Grand Prix tournament, to Sweden's Jan Norbäck.

== Grand Prix career finals ==
=== Singles: 1 (0–1) ===
Result	W-L	Date	Tournament	Surface	Opponent	Score
Loss	0–1	Jan 1977	Zurich, Switzerland	Hard	(Sweden) Jan Norbäck	5–7, 2–6

=== Doubles: 1 (1–0) ===
Result	W-L	Date	Tournament	Surface	Partner	Opponents	Score
Win	1–0	Apr 1976	Barcelona, Spain	Clay	(Poland) Wojciech Fibak	(Rhodesia) Colin Dowdeswell (Australia) Paul Kronk	6–2, 6–3

== Coaching ==
After his playing career, Niedźwiedzki ran a tennis academy in Sopot. As a coach he has worked with Johan Kriek and Sylvia Hanika. He has also been involved with the Austria Fed Cup team and coached Bahrain in the Davis Cup.

== See also ==
- List of Poland Davis Cup team representatives
