= Laurie Rowley (tennis) =

American tennis player

- Full name: Laurie Rowley (nee Fleming)
- Country (sports): United States
- Born: June 14, 1955 (age 71)
- Plays: Right-handed

Grand Slam singles results
- French Open: 2R (1975)
- US Open: 2R (1973)

Grand Slam doubles results
- French Open: 2R (1975)
- US Open: 2R (1972)

Grand Slam mixed doubles results
- French Open: 1R (1975)

Laurie Rowley (born June 14, 1955) is an American former professional tennis player. She competed under her maiden name Laurie Fleming until her marriage to Pike Rowley.

== Biography ==
=== Early life ===
Born in 1955, Rowley grew up in Fort Lauderdale, Florida as a close childhood friend of Chris Evert, with whom she often drew comparison due to their identical two-handed backhands and similar appearance. Rowley's sister, Carrie Fleming, also competed on the professional tennis tour and was a four-time All-American college player for the Trinity Tigers

Rowley, an Orange Bowl champion in the girls' 14s and 16s, was also a national hardcourt champion in both those divisions, in 1969 and 1971.

=== Professional tennis ===
From 1973 to 1975 she toured professionally and then spent some time away from the circuit while she started a family. Her best results include quarter-final appearances at the 1973 Family Circle Cup and 1974 Virginia Slims of San Francisco. While competing in grand slam tournaments, she registered wins over Laura duPont and Christina Sandberg, at the US Open and French Open respectively.

In 1979 she made a brief comeback on tour.
