= Dianne Fromholtz =

Australian tennis player (born 1956)

Dianne Fromholtz Balestrat
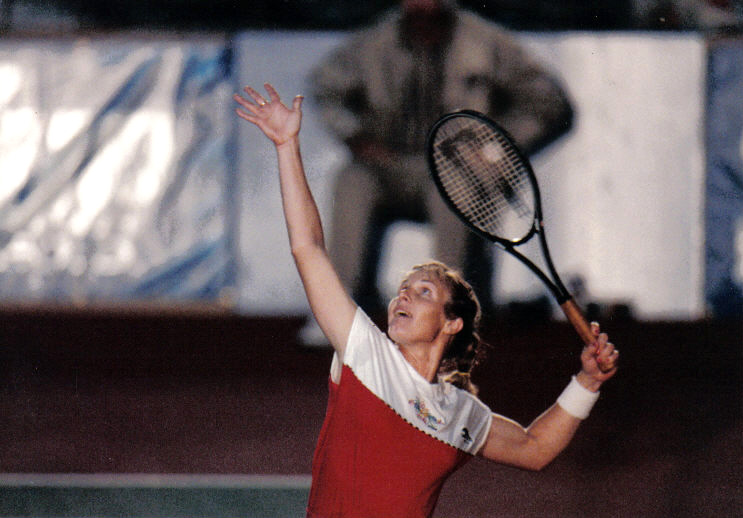
- Fromholtz in 1989
- Country (sports): Australia
- Residence: Melbourne, Australia
- Born: 10 August 1956 (age 69) Albury, Australia
- Height: 1.65 m (5 ft 5 in)
- Turned pro: 1973
- Retired: 1990
- Plays: Left-handed (one-handed backhand)
- Prize money: US$1,145,377

Singles
- Career record: 429–223
- Career titles: 8
- Highest ranking: No. 4 (19 March 1979)

Grand Slam singles results
- Australian Open: F (1977^{Jan})
- French Open: SF (1979, 1980)
- Wimbledon: QF (1979, 1987)
- US Open: SF (1976)

Doubles
- Career record: 134–141
- Career titles: 6
- Highest ranking: No. 56 (14 September 1987)

Grand Slam doubles results
- Australian Open: W (1977)
- French Open: SF (1979)
- Wimbledon: QF (1979)
- US Open: QF (1979)

Grand Slam mixed doubles results
- Australian Open: QF (1987, 1988)
- French Open: SF (1975)
- Wimbledon: F (1980)
- US Open: 2R (1983)

Team competitions
- Fed Cup: W (1974)

Dianne Fromholtz Balestrat (née Fromholtz; born 10 August 1956) is an Australian former professional tennis player who reached a highest singles ranking of world No. 4 in 1979.

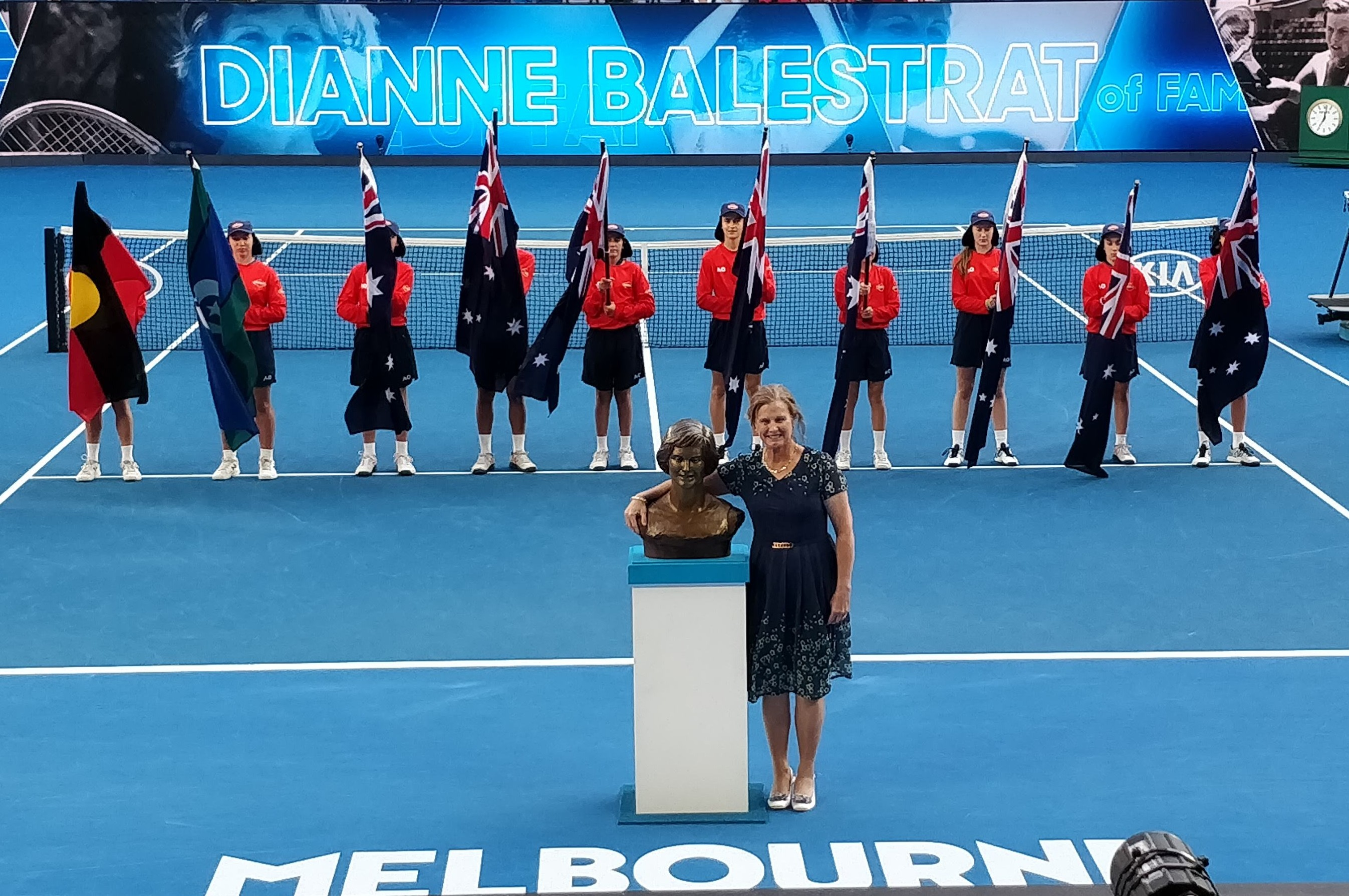
In 2019, Fromholtz was inducted into the Australian Tennis Hall of Fame, commemorated by a bronze bust.

== Career ==
Fromholtz began playing tennis at the age of seven. She left school at the age of 16 to play in international tournaments. She turned pro in 1973 and joined the WTA Tour.

At the age of 17, she participated in the professional tennis circuit, winning the singles title at a dozen tournaments in 1973, but the rules at the time did not permit prize money to be paid to participants under 18 years of age.

She reached the finals of the Australian Open in January 1977, losing to fellow Australian Kerry Melville Reid in two sets. She was a semifinalist at the French Open in 1979 and 1980. She also reached the semifinals of the US Open in 1976.

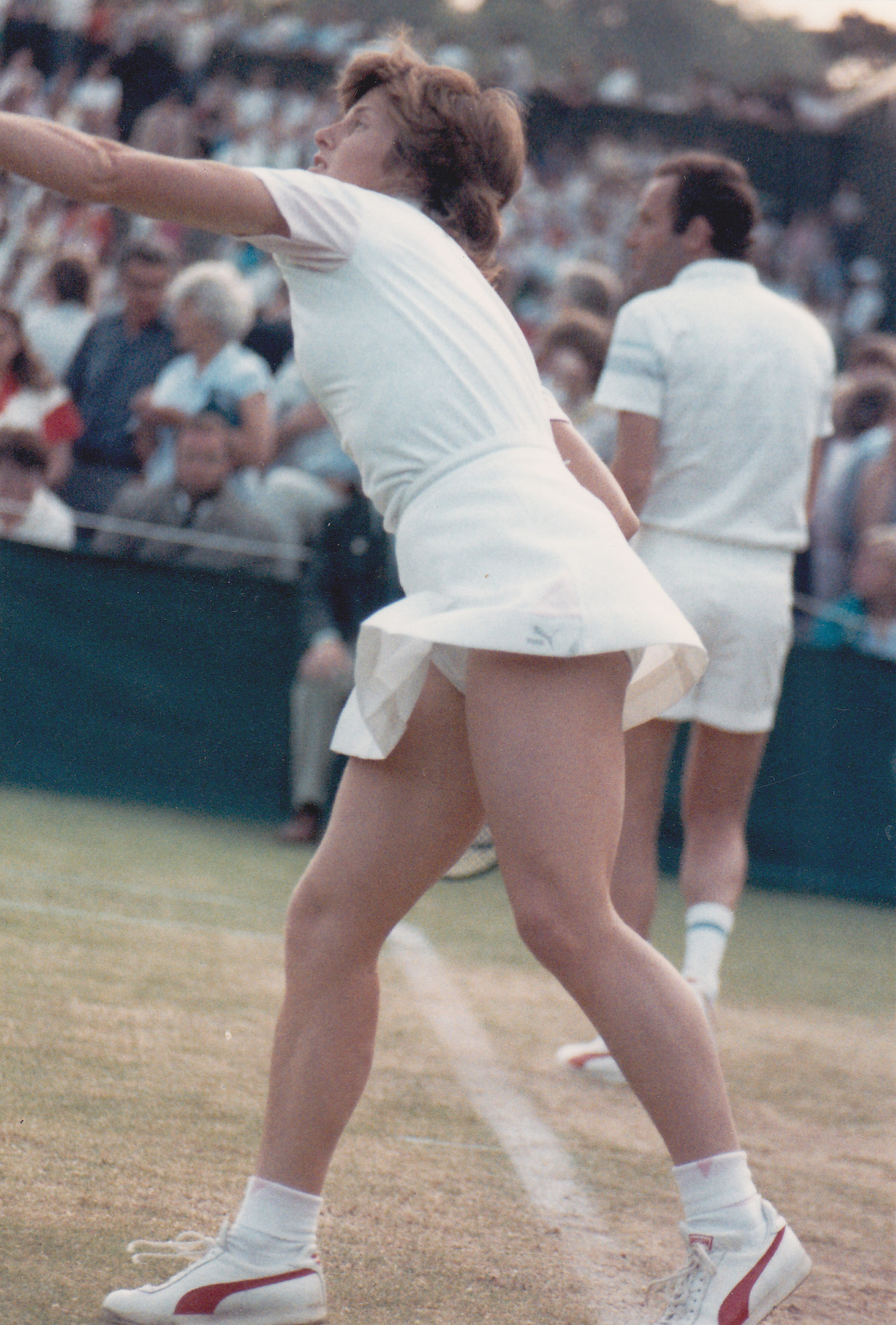
Dianne Fromholtz Balestrat in Wimbledon Mixed Doubles with Tom Okker in the background, 1985

Fromholtz won eight WTA Tour singles titles and reached a career-high ranking of world No. 4 in 1979. Partnering with Helen Gourlay Cawley, she won the Australian Open women's doubles in January 1977. She had career wins over Chris Evert, Martina Navratilova, Billie Jean King, Evonne Goolagong Cawley, Margaret Court, Virginia Wade, Pam Shriver, and Gabriela Sabatini. She holds an 8–7 career record over King.

Fromholtz met French businessman Claude Balestrat at a New Year's Eve party in 1981, and the couple wed in Dural on 26 December 1982.

On 30 August 2000, Fromholtz was awarded the Australian Sports Medal for her commitment to tennis.

In 2019, Fromholtz was inducted into the Australian Tennis Hall of Fame, commemorated by a bronze bust located in Garden Square, within Melbourne Park.

== Grand Slam finals ==
=== Singles: (1 runners-up) ===
Result	Year	Championship	Surface	Opponent	Score
Loss	1977^{(J)}	Australian Open	Grass	(Australia) Kerry Melville Reid	5–7, 2–6

=== Doubles: (1 title) ===
Result	Year	Championship	Surface	Partner	Opponents	Score
Win	1977^{(J)}	Australian Open	Grass	(Australia) Helen Gourlay	(Australia) Kerry Melville Reid (United States) Betsy Nagelsen	5–7, 6–1, 7–5

=== Mixed doubles: (1 runner-up) ===
Result	Year	Championship	Surface	Partner	Opponents	Score
Loss	1980	Wimbledon	Grass	(Australia) Mark Edmondson	(United States) Tracy Austin (United States) John Austin	6–4, 6–7^{(6–8)}, 3–6

== WTA career finals ==
=== Singles: 24 (8–16) ===
Winner – Legend Grand Slam tournaments (0–1) WTA Tour Championships (0–0) Virginia Slims, Avon, Other (8–15)	Titles by surface Hard (0–4) Grass (4–5) Clay (3–1) Carpet (1–6)

Result	W–L	Date	Tournament	Surface	Opponent	Score
Win	1–0	May 1973	Guildford, UK	Clay	(Japan) Kazuko Sawamatsu	7–5, 4–6, 6–3
Win	2–0	Jun 1973	Chichester, UK	Grass	(South Africa) Brigitte Cuypers	6–1, 6–0
Win	3–0	Jun 1973	Beckenham, UK	Grass	(United States) Janet Newberry	7–5, 0–6, 6–1
Loss	3–1	Jul 1973	Newport, US	Grass	(United States) Julie Heldman	6–1, 1–6, 9–11
Loss	3–2	Nov 1973	Adelaide, Australia	Grass	(Australia) Janet Young	5–7, 1–6
Win	4–2	Nov 1973	Sydney, Australia	Clay	(United States) Ann Kiyomura	6–1, 7–5
Loss	4–3	Aug 1974	South Orange, US	Grass	(United States) Pam Teeguarden	5–7, 3–6
Loss	4–4	Nov 1974	Johannesburg, South Africa	Hard	(Australia) Kerry Melville	3–6, 5–7
Loss	4–5	Aug 1975	Indianapolis, US	Clay	(United States) Chris Evert	3–6, 4–6
Loss	4–6	Octr 1976	Phoenix, US	Hard	(United States) Chris Evert	1–6, 5–7
Win	5–6	Nov 1976	Sydney, Australia	Clay	(Australia) Leanne Harrison	6–1, 6–0
Loss	5–7	Dec 1976	Sydney, Australia	Grass	(Australia) Kerry Melville Reid	6–3, 2–6, 3–6
Loss	5–8	Jan 1977	Australian Open	Grass	(Australia) Kerry Melville Reid	5–7, 2–6
Loss	5–9	Oct 1977	Atlanta, US	Carpet	(United States) Chris Evert	3–6, 2–6
Loss	5–10	Feb 1978	Detroit, US	Carpet	(United States) Martina Navratilova	3–6, 2–6
Win	6–10	Dec 1978	Sydney, Australia	Grass	(Australia) Kerry Melville Reid	6–1, 1–6, 6–4
Win	7–10	Dec 1978	Sydney, Australia	Grass	(Australia) Wendy Turnbull	6–2, 7–5
Loss	7–11	Jan 1979	Hollywood, US	Carpet	(South Africa) Greer Stevens	4–6, 6–2, 4–6
Win	8–11	Mar 1979	Boston, US	Carpet	(United Kingdom) Sue Barker	6–2, 7–6^{(7–4)}
Loss	8–12	Mar 1979	Carlsbad, US	Hard	(United States) Chris Evert	6–3, 3–6, 1–6
Loss	8–13	Oct 1979	Minneapolis, US	Carpet	(Australia) Evonne Goolagong	3–6, 4–6
Loss	8–14	Sep 1980	Minneapolis, US	Carpet	(United States) Tracy Austin	1–6, 6–2, 2–6
Loss	8–15	May 1985	Sydney, Australia	Carpet	(United States) Pam Shriver	3–6, 4–6
Loss	8–16	Mar 1987	Phoenix, US	Hard	(United States) Anne White	1–6, 2–6

=== Doubles: 12 (5-1–6) ===
Winner – Legend Grand Slam tournaments (1–0) WTA Tour Championships (0–0) Virginia Slims, Avon, Other (4–1-6)	Titles by surface Hard (2–2) Grass (1-1–3) Clay (2–1) Carpet (0–0)

Result	No.	Date	Tournament	Surface	Partner	Opponents	Score
Draw	1.	Jul 1973	Newport, US	Grass	(United States) Julie Heldman	(United States) Patti Hogan (United States) Sharon Walsh	1–5 shared – final rained out
Loss	1.	Dec 1973	Hobart, Australia	Grass	(United Kingdom) Jackie Fayter	(Australia) Helen Gourlay (Australia) Karen Krantzcke	2–6, 1–6
Win	1.	Apr 1974	Phoenix, US	Hard	(Australia) Janet Young	(United States) Ann Kiyomura (United States) Betsy Nagelsen	w/o
Loss	2.	Nov 1974	Johannesburg, South Africa	Hard	(Australia) Margaret Court	(South Africa) Ilana Kloss (Australia) Kerry Melville	3–6, 5–7
Win	2.	May 1975	Hamburg, West Germany	Clay	(Czechoslovakia) Renáta Tomanová	(Israel) Paulina Peisachov (Japan) Kazuko Sawamatsu	6–3, 6–2
Win	3.	Mar 1976	Tallahassee, US	Hard	(United States) Julie Anthony	(Romania) Virginia Ruzici (Romania) Mariana Simionescu	6–2, 7–5
Loss	3.	Dec 1976	Sydney, Australia	Grass	(Czechoslovakia) Renáta Tomanová	(Australia) Helen Gourlay (United States) Betsy Nagelsen	4–6, 1–6
Win	4.	Jan 1977	Australian Open	Grass	(Australia) Helen Gourlay	(Australia) Kerry Melville Reid (United States) Betsy Nagelsen	5–7, 6–1, 7–5
Loss	4.	Sep 1977	Hilton Head, US	Clay	(United Kingdom) Virginia Wade	(Australia) Evonne Goolagong (Australia) Kerry Melville Reid	2–6, 6–3, 4–6
Win	5.	May 1979	Vienna, Austria	Clay	(South Africa) Marise Kruger	(South Africa) Ilana Kloss (United States) Betty Ann Stuart	3–6, 6–4, 6–1
Loss	5.	Nov 1979	Melbourne, Australia	Grass	(United States) Anne Smith	(United States) Billie Jean King (Australia) Wendy Turnbull	3–6, 3–6
Loss	6.	Feb 1983	Palm Springs, US	Hard	(Netherlands) Betty Stöve	(United States) Kathy Jordan (United States) Ann Kiyomura	2–6, 2–6

== Grand Slam singles tournament timeline ==
Key
W	F	SF	QF	#R	RR	Q#	DNQ	A	NH

(W) winner; (F) finalist; (SF) semifinalist; (QF) quarterfinalist; (#R) rounds 4, 3, 2, 1; (RR) round-robin stage; (Q#) qualification round; (DNQ) did not qualify; (A) absent; (NH) not held; (SR) strike rate (events won / competed); (W–L) win–loss record.

Tournament	1971	1972	1973	1974	1975	1976	1977	1978	1979	1980	1981	1982	1983	1984	1985	1986	1987	1988	1989	1990	Career SR
Australian Open (Jan)	1R	A	QF	2R	3R	A	F	Held in December								NH	3R	1R	1R	1R	0 / 13
French Open	A	A	A	3R	3R	A	A	A	SF	SF	3R	A	A	A	1R	A	2R	A	A	A	0 / 7
Wimbledon	A	A	1R	1R	1R	4R	A	4R	QF	4R	3R	A	1R	A	2R	4R	QF	2R	1R	A	0 / 14
US Open	A	A	A	3R	2R	SF	4R	3R	4R	4R	1R	2R	1R	A	1R	A	1R	2R	A	A	0 / 13
Australian Open (Dec)	Held in January						A	A	A	A	1R	2R	A	2R	3R	NH	Held in January				
SR	0 / 1	0 / 0	0 / 2	0 / 4	0 / 4	0 / 2	0 / 2	0 / 2	0 / 3	0 / 3	0 / 4	0 / 2	0 / 2	0 / 1	0 / 4	0 / 1	0 / 4	0 / 3	0 / 2	0 / 1	0 / 47
Year-end ranking					20	5	8	10	6	12	38	32	75	99	30	25	21	56	112	NR	

Note: The Australian Open was held twice in 1977, in January and December.

== See also ==
- Performance timelines for all female tennis players since 1978 who reached at least one Grand Slam final
