= Anatoli Volkov =

Soviet tennis player

- Full name: Anatolij Filippovič Volkov
- Country (sports): Soviet Union; Russia
- Born: 8 March 1948 (age 78)
- Plays: Right-handed

Singles
- Career record: 2–6
- Career titles: 0
- Highest ranking: No. 163 (3 Jun 1974)

Grand Slam singles results
- French Open: 2R (1971, 1975)
- Wimbledon: 1R (1970)

Doubles
- Career record: 4–5
- Career titles: 0

Grand Slam doubles results
- French Open: 3R (1971)
Medal record
Representing Soviet Union
Men's Tennis
Summer Universiade
Silver medal – second place	1970 Turin	Men's Doubles

Anatoli Volkov (born 8 March or February 1 1948) is a former professional tennis player from the Soviet Union.

== Career ==
Volkov had his first singles win in a Grand Slam match at the 1971 French Open, where he beat Jaime Fillol in the first round. He also reached the third round of the men's doubles, with Toomas Leius.

He took part in the tennis demonstration event at the 1968 Summer Olympics.

Leius would partner Volkov again at the 1970 Summer Universiade, in the men's doubles. They won a silver medal.

Volkov made the second round of the French Open once more in 1975, defeating Jose Mandarino in the opening round. In the mixed doubles he managed to reach the quarter-finals. His partner was Romanian Mariana Simionescu.

He played a Davis Cup tie for the Soviet Union in Jūrmala in 1975, against Sweden. The Soviet player appeared in two of the singles rubbers, which he lost, to Björn Borg and Birger Andersson.

At a later stage of his career, Anatoli Volkov graduated from Russian State University of Physical Education, Sport, Youth and Tourism as a professional coach. He coached Soviet girls' team at the Helvetia Cup winning with them this trophy in 1983. In 1986 and 1991 he took the position of the captain in the Soviet Fed Cup team, and in 1992 at the newly formed Russia Fed Cup team.v Svetlana Parkhomenko was one of the female players coached by him personally.
