= 1975 French Open – Men's singles =

Men's singles
- 1975 French Open

Final
- Champion: (Sweden) Björn Borg
- Runner-up: (Argentina) Guillermo Vilas
- Score: 6–2, 6–3, 6–4

Details
- Draw: 128
- Seeds: 16

Events
Singles	men	women		boys	girls
Doubles	men	women	mixed	boys	girls
WC Singles	men	women	quad
WC Doubles	men	women	quad
Legends	−45	45+	women
- French Open

Defending champion Björn Borg defeated Guillermo Vilas in the final, 6–2, 6–3, 6–4 to win the men's singles tennis title at the 1975 French Open. It was his second French Open title and second major title overall.

The first two rounds of the tournament were played as best-of-three sets, while the last five rounds were played as best-of-five sets.

== Seeds ==
The seeded players are listed below. Björn Borg was the champion; others show the round in which they were eliminated.

1. (Sweden) Björn Borg (champion)
2. (Spain) Manuel Orantes (first round)
3. (Romania) Ilie Năstase (third round)
4. (Argentina) Guillermo Vilas (final)
5. (United States) Roscoe Tanner (third round)
6. (Australia) John Alexander (fourth round)
7. (Mexico) Raúl Ramírez (quarterfinals)
8. (United States) Harold Solomon (quarterfinals)
9. (Soviet Union) Alex Metreveli (second round)
10. (United States) Eddie Dibbs (semifinals)
11. (Chile) Jaime Fillol Sr. (fourth round)
12. (France) François Jauffret (fourth round)
13. (United States) Brian Gottfried (fourth round)
14. (Czechoslovakia) Jan Kodeš (fourth round)
15. (United States) Stan Smith (fourth round)
16. (New Zealand) Onny Parun (quarterfinals)

== Draw ==
Key

- Q = Qualifier
- WC = Wild card
- LL = Lucky loser
- Alt = Alternate
- ITF = ITF entry
- PR = Protected ranking
- SR = Special ranking
- SE = Special exempt
- JE = Junior exempt
- JR = Junior Accelerator Programme entrant
- CO = College Accelerator Programme entrant
- NG = Next Gen Accelerator Program entrant
- w/o = Walkover
- r = Retired
- d = Defaulted

=== Finals ===
Quarterfinals
10	(United States) Eddie Dibbs	4	7	6	5	6
7	(Mexico) Raúl Ramírez	6	6	1	7	4
4	(Argentina) Guillermo Vilas	6	6	7
16	(New Zealand) Onny Parun	2	2	6
(United States) John Andrews	4	7	6	2
(Italy) Adriano Panatta	6	5	7	6
8	(United States) Harold Solomon	1	5	4
1	(Sweden) Björn Borg	6	7	6

Semifinals
10	(United States) Eddie Dibbs	1	4	6	1
4	(Argentina) Guillermo Vilas	6	6	1	6
(Italy) Adriano Panatta	4	6	5	4
1	(Sweden) Björn Borg	6	1	7	6

Final
4	(Argentina) Guillermo Vilas	2	3	4
1	(Sweden) Björn Borg	6	6	6

=== Top half ===
==== Section 1 ====
First round
2	(Spain) Orantes	3	0
(Italy) Zugarelli	6	6
(Mexico) Lara	5	3
(Argentina) Álvarez	7	6
(United Kingdom) Stilwell	6	3	2
(Mexico) Loyo-Mayo	3	6	6
(Chile) Pinto-Bravo	3	7	3
(Australia) Dibley	6	5	6
10	(United States) Dibbs	6	6
Q	(Monaco) Borfiga	3	2
(Hungary) Taróczy	7	6
(Australia) James	5	2
(West Germany) Elschenbroich	5	4
(Rhodesia) Pattison	7	6
(Socialist Federal Republic of Yugoslavia) Pilić	6	6
(France) Naegelen	4	2

Second round
(Italy) Zugarelli	6	4	6
(Argentina) Álvarez	3	6	3
(Mexico) Loyo-Mayo	3	4
(Australia) Dibley	6	6
10	(United States) Dibbs	6	6
(Hungary) Taróczy	3	4
(Rhodesia) Pattison	4	3
(Socialist Federal Republic of Yugoslavia) Pilić	6	6

Third round
(Italy) Zugarelli	6	6	7
(Australia) Dibley	3	4	5
10	(United States) Dibbs	6	6	3	6
(Socialist Federal Republic of Yugoslavia) Pilić	2	2	6	4

Fourth round
(Italy) Zugarelli	4	5	4
10	(United States) Dibbs	6	7	6

==== Section 2 ====
First round
7	(Mexico) Ramírez	6	6
(United Kingdom) Farrell	4	1
(Spain) Gisbert Sr	1	4
Q	(United Kingdom) Robinson	6	6
(Colombia) Velasco Sr.	6	7
(Czechoslovakia) Písecký	2	5
(Italy) Barazzutti	6	6	6
(United States) Kreiss	7	3	4
12	(France) Jauffret	7	6
(Australia) Crealy	5	3
(Socialist Federal Republic of Yugoslavia) Špear	7	5	7
(Brazil) Koch	6	7	5
(West Germany) Pinner	6	3	4
(Sweden) Johansson	4	6	6
(Chile) Cornejo	6	6
Q	(West Germany) Marten	7	7

Second round
7	(Mexico) Ramírez	7	6
Q	(United Kingdom) Robinson	6	0
(Colombia) Velasco Sr.	3	1
(Italy) Barazzutti	6	6
12	(France) Jauffret	6	7
(Socialist Federal Republic of Yugoslavia) Špear	1	5
(Sweden) Johansson	6	6
Q	(West Germany) Marten	4	2

Third round
7	(Mexico) Ramírez	4	6	6	6
(Italy) Barazzutti	6	4	0	1
12	(France) Jauffret	1	3	6	6	6
(Sweden) Johansson	6	6	3	1	4

Fourth round
7	(Mexico) Ramírez	6	6	6
12	(France) Jauffret	2	1	4

==== Section 3 ====
First round
4	(Argentina) Vilas	6	6
(West Germany) Plötz	0	0
Q	(Spain) Muntañola	6	6
(Sweden) Svensson	3	2
Q	(Argentina) Cano	6	6
(West Germany) Gebert	2	4
(Netherlands) Thung	6	4
Q	(United States) Neely	7	6
14	(Czechoslovakia) Kodeš	2	6	8
(Poland) Fibak	6	3	6
Q	(Soviet Union) Volkov	3	7	6
(Brazil) Mandarino	6	6	3
(Belgium) Mignot	6	6
(Japan) Kamiwazumi	7	7
Q	(France) Beust	1	4
(Australia) Kronk	6	6

Second round
4	(Argentina) Vilas	6	6
Q	(Spain) Muntañola	1	3
Q	(Argentina) Cano	6	6
Q	(United States) Neely	4	3
14	(Czechoslovakia) Kodeš	6	6
Q	(Soviet Union) Volkov	3	4
(Japan) Kamiwazumi	5	7	2
(Australia) Kronk	7	5	6

Third round
4	(Argentina) Vilas	7	6	6
Q	(Argentina) Cano	5	4	2
14	(Czechoslovakia) Kodeš	6	7	6
(Australia) Kronk	3	6	3

Fourth round
4	(Argentina) Vilas	6	6	6
14	(Czechoslovakia) Kodeš	1	4	2

==== Section 4 ====
First round
6	(Australia) Alexander	6	6
(France) Chanfreau	4	2
(Pakistan) Rahim	6	6
(Venezuela) Hose	3	2
(Soviet Union) Kakoulia	7	2	1
(Chile) Prajoux	5	6	6
(France) Caujolle	2	7	6
(Czechoslovakia) Pála	6	6	3
16	(New Zealand) Parun	6	6
Q	(Spain) Castañón	2	3
Q	(Italy) Toci	4	3
(France) N'Godrella	6	6
(United States) Gerken	7	1	5
(France) Proisy	6	6	7
(Australia) Carmichael	3	5
Q	(Romania) Ovici	6	7

Second round
6	(Australia) Alexander	7	6
(Pakistan) Rahim	6	0
(Chile) Prajoux	6	6
(France) Caujolle	1	4
16	(New Zealand) Parun	6	7
(France) N'Godrella	4	5
(France) Proisy	7	6
Q	(Romania) Ovici	6	0

Third round
6	(Australia) Alexander	6	2	7	7
(Chile) Prajoux	1	6	5	5
16	(New Zealand) Parun	6	6	6	6
(France) Proisy	2	7	2	4

Fourth round
6	(Australia) Alexander	2	6	6	3	6
16	(New Zealand) Parun	6	2	3	6	8

=== Bottom half ===
==== Section 5 ====
First round
(United States) Van Dillen	6	6
(West Germany) Meiler	1	2
Q	(Hungary) Baranyi	6	6
(France) Deblicker	3	4
Q	(Brazil) Kirmayr	2	6	8
(United Kingdom) Battrick	6	3	6
(Sweden) Bengtson	2	4
9	(Soviet Union) Metreveli	6	6
(Spain) Higueras	4	4
(United States) Andrews	6	6
Q	(France) Barclay	5	3
(United States) Estep	7	6
(France) Barthes	6	6
Q	(Romania) Sânteiu	4	2
(United Kingdom) Feaver	0	4
5	(United States) Tanner	6	6

Second round
(United States) Van Dillen	6	6
Q	(Hungary) Baranyi	3	3
Q	(Brazil) Kirmayr	2	7	6
9	(Soviet Union) Metreveli	6	5	4
(United States) Andrews	6	4	8
(United States) Estep	1	6	6
(France) Barthes	4	6	2
5	(United States) Tanner	6	3	6

Third round
(United States) Van Dillen	6	6	7
Q	(Brazil) Kirmayr	4	4	6
(United States) Andrews	3	3	6	6	6
5	(United States) Tanner	6	6	3	4	4

Fourth round
(United States) Van Dillen	2	5	6	6	3
(United States) Andrews	6	7	0	2	6

==== Section 6 ====
First round
(Spain) Muñoz	6	6
(United States) McNair	3	0
(Socialist Federal Republic of Yugoslavia) Franulović	5	6	6
(France) Contet	7	2	4
(South Africa) Yuill	6	6
(United States) Fisher	2	4
Q	(Poland) J Niedźwiedzki	2	6	1
11	(Chile) Fillol Sr.	6	3	6
(West Germany) Gehring	5	4
(Italy) Panatta	7	6
(Czechoslovakia) Holeček	4	7	4
(United States) Crawford	6	5	6
(Japan) Kuki	3	1
(Italy) Bertolucci	6	6
(Australia) Phillips-Moore	3	2
3	(Romania) Năstase	6	6

Second round
(Spain) Muñoz	0	7	2
(Socialist Federal Republic of Yugoslavia) Franulović	6	6	6
(South Africa) Yuill	6	2
11	(Chile) Fillol Sr.	7	6
(Italy) Panatta	6	6
(United States) Crawford	2	2
(Italy) Bertolucci	6	3	0
3	(Romania) Năstase	3	6	6

Third round
(Socialist Federal Republic of Yugoslavia) Franulović	4	4	5
11	(Chile) Fillol Sr.	6	6	7
(Italy) Panatta	6	3	7	6
3	(Romania) Năstase	4	6	6	1

Fourth round
11	(Chile) Fillol Sr.	3	4	4
(Italy) Panatta	6	6	6

==== Section 7 ====
First round
(United Kingdom) Taylor	6	6
Q	(Spain) Mir	3	3
(United States) Stewart	2	4
(France) Dominguez	6	6
(United States) Gorman	6	6
Q	(Australia) Rheinberger	2	1
(Sweden) Andersson	7	3	4
13	(United States) Gottfried	5	6	6
(Austria) Kary	7	6
(Egypt) El Shafei	6	3
(France) Goven	6	6
Q	(Bolivia) Benavides	3	2
(United States) Krulevitz	6	6
(Rhodesia) Dowdeswell	3	2
(Colombia) Molina	1	4
8	(United States) Solomon	6	6

Second round
(United Kingdom) Taylor	6	6
(France) Dominguez	4	3
(United States) Gorman	6	4
13	(United States) Gottfried	7	6
(Austria) Kary	3	5
(France) Goven	6	7
(United States) Krulevitz	2	2
8	(United States) Solomon	6	6

Third round
(United Kingdom) Taylor	0	1	5
13	(United States) Gottfried	6	6	7
(France) Goven	1	6	1	6	1
8	(United States) Solomon	6	3	6	2	6

Fourth round
13	(United States) Gottfried	7	6	6	6	4
8	(United States) Solomon	5	1	7	7	6

==== Section 8 ====
First round
(United Kingdom) Lloyd	6	7
(Brazil) Gentil	4	5
(Australia) Dent	2	5
(South Africa) Moore	6	7
(Argentina) Ganzábal	6	7
Q	(Venezuela) Andrew	0	5
(Argentina) T Vázquez	4	4
15	(United States) Smith	6	6
(United States) Dell	3	6
(Czechoslovakia) Hřebec	6	7
(West Germany) Korpás	7	2	3
(United States) Waltke	5	6	6
(Hungary) Szőke	6	6
(Rhodesia) Dowdeswell	3	4
(United States) Holmes	2	3
1	(Sweden) Borg	6	6

Second round
(United Kingdom) Lloyd	0	6	3
(South Africa) Moore	6	3	6
(Argentina) Ganzábal	3	2
15	(United States) Smith	6	6
(Czechoslovakia) Hřebec	6	6
(United States) Waltke	3	3
(Hungary) Szőke	1	1
1	(Sweden) Borg	6	6

Third round
(South Africa) Moore	0	6	2	3
15	(United States) Smith	6	1	6	6
(Czechoslovakia) Hřebec	1	1	1
1	(Sweden) Borg	6	6	6

Fourth round
15	(United States) Smith	2	3	0
1	(Sweden) Borg	6	6	6

Preceded by 1975 Australian Open	Grand Slam men's singles	Succeeded by 1975 Wimbledon Championships
