= Beatrix Klein =

Hungarian tennis player

Beatrix Klein-Szalay
- Full name: Beatrix Klein-Szalay
- Country (sports): Hungary
- Born: 19 January 1953 (age 72)

Singles

Grand Slam singles results
- French Open: 1R (1975, 1976, 1978)
- US Open: 1R (1981)

Doubles

Grand Slam doubles results
- French Open: 2R (1978)
- US Open: 1R (1976)

Grand Slam mixed doubles results
- French Open: 2R (1974)

Beatrix Klein-Szalay (born 19 January 1953) is a Hungarian former professional tennis player.

A native of Budapest, Klein was Hungary's national singles champion in 1976 and represented her country in 10 Federation Cup rubbers. During her career she made three singles main draw appearance at the French Open and qualified for the US Open in 1981. She now lives in New Jersey, where she coaches tennis.

== See also ==
- List of Hungary Fed Cup team representatives
