= Martin Robinson (tennis) =

British tennis player (born 1955)

- Country (sports): United Kingdom
- Born: 19 October 1955 (age 70)
- Plays: Left-handed

Singles
- Career record: 14–36
- Highest ranking: No. 105 (1975.12.15)

Grand Slam singles results
- Australian Open: 2R (1975)
- French Open: 2R (1975)
- Wimbledon: 1R (1975, 1976)

Doubles
- Career record: 6–19

Grand Slam doubles results
- Australian Open: 1R (1975)
- French Open: 1R (1976)
- Wimbledon: 2R (1976)

Grand Slam mixed doubles results
- Wimbledon: 2R (1974, 1976)

Martin Robinson (born 19 October 1955) is a British former professional tennis player.

A left-handed player from Bolton, Robinson competed on the professional tour in the 1970s and reached a career singles best ranking of 105 in the world.

In the 1975 season he made the second round of both the Australian Open and French Open.

Robinson also featured in the main draw at Wimbledon during his career, including in 1976 when he lost in the first round to seventh seed Roscoe Tanner.
