= John Andrews (tennis) =

American tennis player

- Country (sports): United States
- Born: February 5, 1952 (age 73); Houston, Texas, U.S.
- Plays: Right-handed

Singles
- Career record: 28–49
- Career titles: 0
- Highest ranking: No. 64 (26 June 1975)

Grand Slam singles results
- Australian Open: 3R (1975)
- French Open: QF (1975)
- Wimbledon: 2R (1976)
- US Open: 3R (1975)

Doubles
- Career record: 35–44
- Career titles: 1

Grand Slam doubles results
- Australian Open: QF (1975)
- French Open: 3R (1976)
- Wimbledon: 3R (1974)
- US Open: 1R (1974, 1975)

John Andrews (born February 5, 1952), is a former professional tennis player from the United States.

Andrews achieved a career-high singles ranking of world No. 64 in June 1975 after reaching the quarterfinals of the French Open. He won one ATP doubles title in 1976 partnering Colin Dibley.

== Grand Prix, WCT, and Grand Slam finals ==
=== Doubles (1 titles, 2 runner-ups) ===
Result	W/L	Date	Tournament	Surface	Partner	Opponents	Score
Loss	0–1	Aug 1975	Boston, U.S.	Clay	(United States) Mike Estep	(United States) Brian Gottfried (Mexico) Raúl Ramírez	6–4, 3–6, 6–7
Win	1–1	Apr 1976	Palma, Spain	Clay	(Australia) Colin Dibley	(Australia) Mark Edmondson (Australia) John Marks	2–6, 6–3, 6–2
Loss	1–2	Apr 1976	Madrid, Spain	Clay	(Australia) Colin Dibley	(Brazil) Carlos Kirmayr (Spain) Eduardo Mandarino	6–7, 6–4, 6–8
