= Nathalie Fuchs =

French tennis player (born 1952)

- Full name: Nathalie Barrière-Fuchs
- Country (sports): France
- Born: 3 September 1952 (age 72); Paris, France
- Plays: Right-handed

Singles

Grand Slam singles results
- Australian Open: 2R (1973)
- French Open: 3R (1973, 1974, 1976)
- Wimbledon: 2R (1973, 1975)
- US Open: 1R (1972, 1974, 1975)

Doubles

Grand Slam doubles results
- Australian Open: 2R (1973)
- French Open: 2R (1971, 1974, 1975)
- Wimbledon: 3R (1972)
- US Open: 1R (1972)

Grand Slam mixed doubles results
- French Open: SF (1974)
- US Open: 2R (1971, 1972)

Nathalie Fuchs (born 3 September 1952) is a French former professional tennis player.

A right-handed player from Paris, Fuchs competed on the professional tour in the 1970s. She was the winner of the 1974 Spanish Championships and played 11 ties for the France Federation Cup team.

Fuchs made the third round of the French Open on three occasions, including in 1974 when she had an upset win over second seed Virginia Wade. She also partnered with Wanaro N'Godrella in the mixed doubles event in 1974 and reached the semi-finals, which was her best grand slam performance.

In the 1975 Federation Cup she remained unbeaten in her singles rubbers up until France's semi-final loss to Czechoslovakia. She had played an important role in the quarter-final win over Great Britain, with her victory against Sue Barker levelling the tie, which was won by France in the doubles. Her three set loss to Renáta Tomanová in the semi-finals however would secure the tie for Czechoslovakia.

== See also ==
- List of France Fed Cup team representatives
