= Paulina Peled =

Israeli tennis player

- Full name: Paulina Peled (nee Peisachov)
- Native name: פאולינה פלד
- Country (sports): Israel
- Born: 20 April 1950 (age 76) Lithuanian SSR

Grand Slam singles results
- French Open: 1R (1975)
- Wimbledon: 2R (1974, 1975, 1977)
- US Open: 2R (1974)

Grand Slam doubles results
- French Open: 1R (1975)
- Wimbledon: 2R (1974)
Medal record
Asian Games
| Gold medal – first place | 1974 Tehran | Mixed Doubles |
| Silver medal – second place | 1974 Tehran | Singles |

Paulina Peled (Hebrew: פאולינה פלד; born 20 April 1950) is an Israeli former professional tennis player. She was known as Paulina Peisachov before marriage.

== Biography ==
Born in Lithuania, Peled moved to Israel at the age of 16.

She competed at the 1969 Maccabiah Games for Israel in women's singles.

Peled studied in the United States in the early 1970s at Arizona State University, where she also played college tennis.

Returning to Israel, she became the first Israeli woman to win Israel's International Tennis Championship for two decades when she claimed the title in 1974.

At the 1974 Asian Games in Tehran, she won a gold medal for Israel in the mixed doubles and a silver medal in the singles.

Peled made the second round of Wimbledon on three occasions. This included 1974, when while in the country she won the Chichester Tennis Tournament with a final win over Sue Barker and she also won the Kent Championships that year.

She joined the professional tour in 1975 and was a regular member of Israel's Federation Cup team for the remainder of the decade, appearing in a total of 14 ties.
