= Elly Appel-Vessies =

Dutch tennis player (1952–2022)

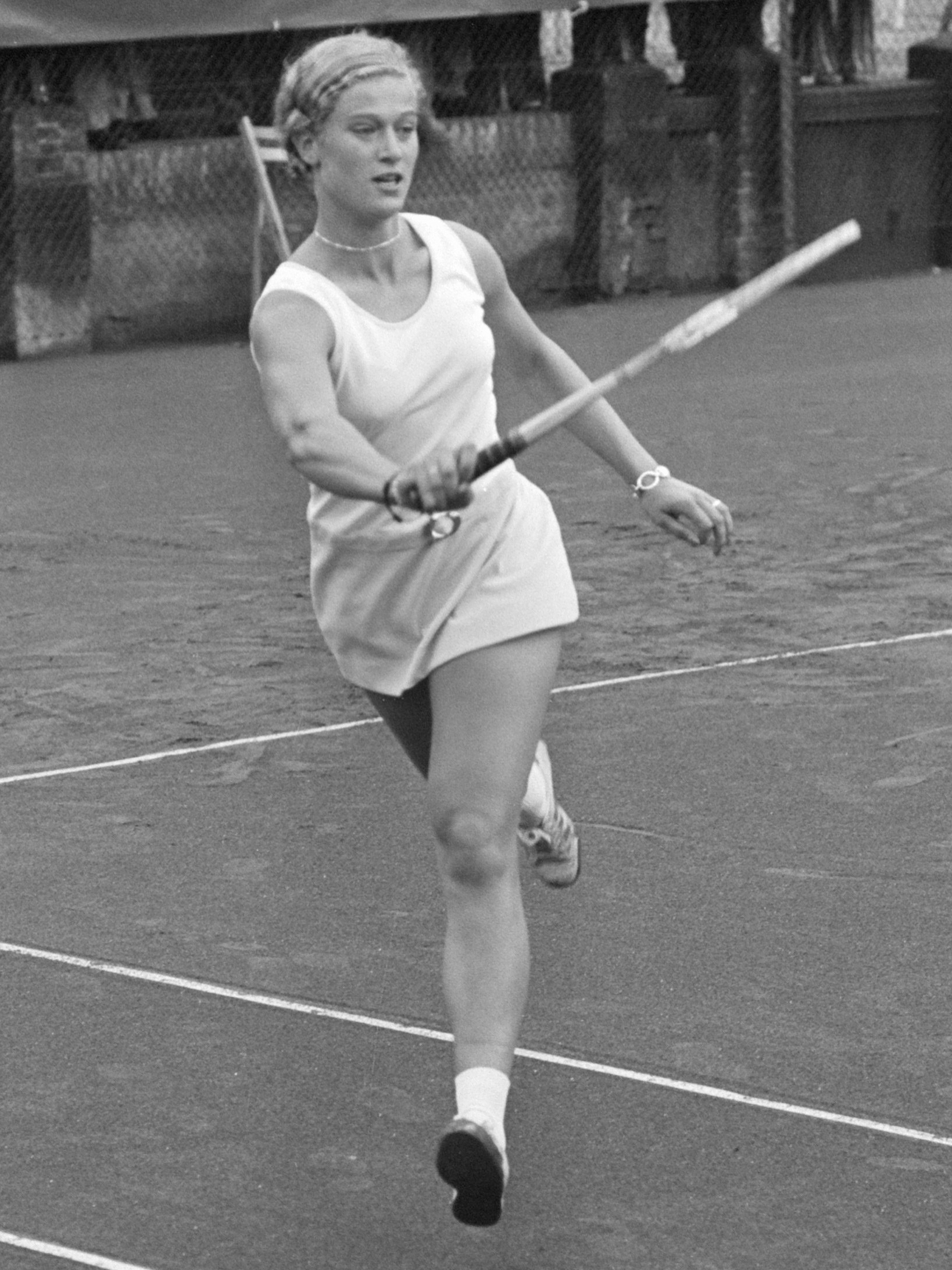
- Appel-Vessies in 1974
- Country (sports): Netherlands
- Born: 27 July 1952; Beverwijk, Netherlands
- Died: 16 July 2022 (aged 69); Charlottesville, Virginia, U.S.
- Turned pro: 1974
- Retired: 1982
- Plays: Right–handed

Singles
- Career record: 27–43
- Career titles: 1

Grand Slam singles results
- French Open: 3R (1975)
- Wimbledon: 2R (1975, 1977)
- US Open: 3R (1976)

Doubles
- Career record: 13–25
- Career titles: 0

Grand Slam doubles results
- French Open: QF (1976)
- US Open: 3R (1974)

Elly Appel-Vessies (27 July 1952 – 16 July 2022) was a professional tennis player from the Netherlands. After retiring, she played some seniors tennis.

Appel-Vessies' best performance in the singles competition at a Grand Slam championship was at the 1975 French Open when she reached the third round. Her best performance in a doubles tournament at a major was at the 1976 French Open when she and Virginia Ruzici reached the quarterfinals.

She also played 30 times for the Netherlands Fed Cup team, winning 17 matches and losing 13. She helped the team retain its place in the World Group during her time as a professional.

Appel-Vessies died on 16 July 2022 at the age of 69.

== Career finals ==
=== Singles: 1 (1 title) ===
Result	Date	Tournament	Surface	Opponent	Score
Win	Jul 1978	Swedish Open	Clay	(West Germany) Sylvia Hanika	2–6, 6–4, 6–2

=== Doubles: 1 (1 runner-up) ===
Result	Date	Tournament	Surface	Partner	Opponents	Score
Loss	Jul 1979	Austrian Open	Clay	(Romania) Virginia Ruzici	(Sweden) Helena Anliot (Australia) Diane Evers	0–6, 4–6
