= Thomaz Koch =

Brazilian tennis player

- Koch in 1971
- Country (sports): Brazil
- Residence: Porto Alegre, Brazil
- Born: 11 May 1945 (age 81) Porto Alegre, Brazil
- Turned pro: 1968 (amateur from 1961)
- Retired: 1985
- Plays: Left-handed (one-handed backhand)

Singles
- Career record: 556–341
- Career titles: 36
- Highest ranking: No. 12 (1967)

Grand Slam singles results
- French Open: QF (1968)
- Wimbledon: QF (1967)
- US Open: QF (1963)

Doubles
- Career record: 111–99 (Open era)
- Career titles: 3 (Open era)

Grand Slam doubles results
- Wimbledon: SF (1971)

Grand Slam mixed doubles results
- French Open: W (1975)
- Wimbledon: QF (1971)
Medal record
Representing Brazil
Tennis, Pan American Games
Gold medal – first place	1967 Winnipeg	Men's Singles
Gold medal – first place	1967 Winnipeg	Men's Doubles

Thomaz Koch (born 11 May 1945) is a former tennis player from Brazil. He won one Grand Slam title in mixed doubles at the 1975 French Open. In singles he was a quarterfinalist in singles at the French Open, Wimbledon and the U.S. National Championships. Koch was active from 1961 to 1985 and played close to 900 singles matches, and won 36 career singles titles. He was ranked World No 12 player for 1967. His highest computer ranking which was past his peak period in the ATP singles ranking was No. 24 (achieved on December 20, 1974). In addition he also won 5 challenger satellite tour tiles towards the end of his career. He won also two gold medals in the men's tennis competition at the 1967 Pan American Games.

He played his first tournament in 1961 at the Santos Open where he reached the final. He won his first senior title in 1964 at the Swiss International Championships against compatriot Ronald Barnes. He won his final main tour title in 1976 at the Malta International against Britain's Roger Taylor. He played his final singles tournament in 1984 at the Guarujá Open in 1984. He also won the Wimbledon Plate twice, in 1969 and 1975.

== Career finals ==
=== Singles (3–2) ===
(incomplete list)

Result	W–L	Date	Tournament	Surface	Opponent	Score
Win	1–0	1969	Caracas, Venezuela	Hard	(United Kingdom) Mark Cox	8–6, 6–3, 2–6, 6–4
Win	2–0	1969	Washington, U.S.	Clay	(United States) Arthur Ashe	7–5, 9–7, 4–6, 2–6, 6–4
Win	3–0	1971	Caracas, Venezuela	Hard	(Spain) Manuel Orantes	7–6, 6–1, 6–3
Loss	3–1	1976	Khartoum, Sudan	Hard	(United States) Mike Estep	4–6, 7–6, 4–6, 3–6
Loss	3–2	1976	Nuremberg, Germany	Carpet (i)	(South Africa) Frew McMillan	6–2, 3–6, 4–6

=== Doubles (3–8) ===
Result	W–L	Date	Tournament	Surface	Partner	Opponents	Score
Loss	0–1	1968	Barcelona, Spain	Clay	(Brazil) José Mandarino	(Brazil) Carlos Fernandes (Chile) Patricio Rodríguez	2–6, 6–3, 6–3, 1–6, 4–6
Loss	0–2	1969	London/Queen's, U.K.	Grass	(Sweden) Ove Nils Bengtson	(Australia) Owen Davidson (United States) Dennis Ralston	6–8, 3–6
Loss	0–3	1971	Salisbury, U.S.	Hard (i)	(United States) Clark Graebner	(Spain) Juan Gisbert, Sr. (Spain) Manuel Orantes	3–6, 6–4, 6–7
Win	1–3	1971	Macon, U.S.	Hard	(United States) Clark Graebner	(Socialist Federal Republic of Yugoslavia) Željko Franulović (Czechoslovakia) Jan Kodeš	6–3, 7–6
Loss	1–4	1971	Hampton, U.S.	Hard (i)	(United States) Clark Graebner	(Romania) Ilie Năstase (Romania) Ion Țiriac	4–6, 6–4, 5–7
Win	2–4	1971	Caracas, Venezuela	Clay	(Brazil) José Edison Mandarino	(United Kingdom) Gerald Battrick (United Kingdom) Peter Curtis	6–4, 3–6, 6–7, 6–4, 7–6
Loss	2–5	1972	Washington D.C., U.S.	Carpet (i)	(United States) Clark Graebner	(United States) Tom Edlefsen (United States) Cliff Richey	4–6, 3–6
Loss	2–6	Jul 1974	Gstaad, Switzerland	Clay	(Australia) Roy Emerson	(Spain) José Higueras (Spain) Manuel Orantes	5–7, 6–0, 1–6, 8–9
Win	3–6	1975	Istanbul, Turkey	Clay	(Australia) Colin Dibley	(Rhodesia) Colin Dowdeswell (United Kingdom) John Feaver	6–2, 6–2, 6–2
Loss	3–7	1982	Itaparica, Brazil	Carpet	(Brazil) José Schmidt	(Brazil) Givaldo Barbosa (Brazil) João Soares	6–7, 1–2 ret.
Loss	3–8	1983	Bahia, Brazil	Hard	(Argentina) Ricardo Cano	(Brazil) Givaldo Barbosa (Brazil) João Soares	

=== Mixed doubles (1–0) ===
Result	Year	Championship	Surface	Partner	Opponents	Score
Win	1975	French Open	Clay	(Uruguay) Fiorella Bonicelli	(Chile) Jaime Fillol (United States) Pam Teeguarden	6–4, 7–6
