= Julie Anthony (tennis) =

American tennis player

- Country (sports): United States
- Born: January 13, 1948 (age 78)
- Height: 5 ft 6 in (1.68 m)
- Turned pro: 1969
- Retired: 1979
- Plays: Right-handed
- College: Stanford

Singles

Grand Slam singles results
- French Open: 2R (1975)
- Wimbledon: 4R (1972)
- US Open: 3rd (1973)

Doubles

Grand Slam doubles results
- French Open: F (1975)
- Wimbledon: SF (1974)
- US Open: SF (1979)

Julie Anthony (born January 13, 1948) is a former professional American tennis player of the 1970s. She played college tennis at Stanford University. Her coach for many years was Ray Casey.

Anthony, who earned a Ph.D. while competing on the women's pro circuit, embodies the word 'scholar-athlete.' A promising junior player in Santa Monica, California, Anthony received free lessons from 1904 U.S. champion May Sutton Bundy, whom she called 'Granny.' Awarded academic and tennis scholarships to Westlake School in Los Angeles at age 15, Anthony subsequently entered Stanford University where she and partner Jane Albert claimed the national collegiate doubles crown in 1967.

As a professional, Anthony helped to inaugurate World Team Tennis in 1974, leading the league in women's doubles wins with partner Billie Jean King. After receiving her doctorate in clinical psychology from UCLA in 1979, Dr. Anthony combined her athletic and clinical skills as a sports psychologist and author. From 1989 to 1994 she coached doubles player Gigi Fernandez to 11 Grand Slam titles and an Olympic gold medal. Providing wise counsel to amateurs and professionals alike, Dr. Julie Anthony has drawn life lessons from the game of tennis.

== Career highlights ==
Winner of Pacific Northwest Singles Championships, January, 1974

Southern California Tennis Association (SCTA) Champion Girls' Under 11 Singles, Doubles 1958

Pacific Southwest Finalist Girls' Under 13 Singles 1960, 1961

SCTA Finalist Girls' Under 13 Singles 1960, Doubles 1961,

Pacific Southwest Finalist Junior Girls' Doubles 1963

SCTA Champion Girls' 16 and Under Singles, Doubles 1964

SCTA Finalist Junior Girls' Singles, Doubles; Junior Women's Singles 1965

U.S. Finalist Girls' 16 Singles 1965

USTA Girls' Sportsmanship Award, Honorable Mention 1966

AAUQ (Pacific-8) Singles Champion 1967

U.S.Collegiate Doubles Champion (with Jane Albert) 1967

B.A. '69 Stanford University

Pacific Southwest Champion Women's Doubles 1972

Played in main draw of U.S. Open singles 1972–1979; quarterfinalist in 1972

Played in main draw of Wimbledon singles 1974–1978

U.S. Wightman Cup Team Member 1975

M.S.'71, Ph.D.'79 UCLA (Clinical Psychology)

Contributing Editor, Tennis Magazine, 1976–present

TV tennis commentator for NBC, CBS and USA networks 1976–1984

Sports psychologist for Philadelphia Flyers hockey team 1980–1982

Coach for Gigi Fernandez (No.1 doubles player in the world)1989–94

Author, A Winning Combination (with Nick Bollettiere) 1980

Inducted into the Stanford university Athletic Hall of Fame

Inducted into the ITA Women's Collegiate Tennis Hall of Fame 2000

Owner of the Aspen Club; founder and director of its Fitness and Sports Medicine Institute 1982 – 1995

Private practice in clinical and sports psychology 1994–present

== WTA Tour finals ==
=== Doubles 2 (1–1) ===
Legend
Grand Slam	0
WTA Championships	0
Tier I	0
Tier II	0
Tier III	0
Tier IV & V	0

Titles by surface
Hard	1
Clay	0
Grass	0
Carpet	0

Result	No.	Date	Tournament	Surface	Partner	Opponents	Score
Loss	1.	Jun 1975	French Open, France	Clay	(Soviet Union) Olga Morozova	(United States) Chris Evert (Czechoslovakia) Martina Navratilova	3–6, 2–6
Win	2.	Sep 1978	World Tennis Classic, Montreal, Canada	Hard	(United States) Billie Jean King	(South Africa) Ilana Kloss (South Africa) Marise Kruger	6–4, 6–4
