= Mariana Simionescu =

Romanian tennis player

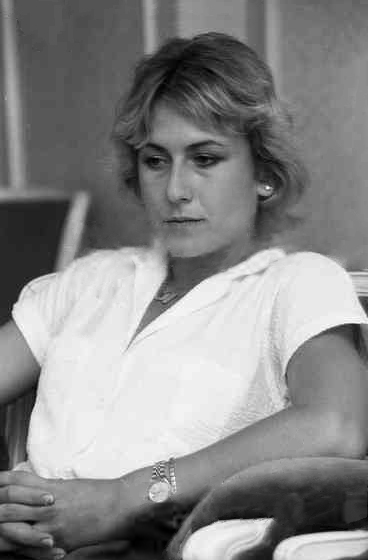
- Simionescu in July 1980
- Country (sports): Romania
- Born: 27 November 1956 (age 69) Târgu Neamț, Romania
- Turned pro: 1974
- Retired: 1980
- Plays: Right-handed (one-handed backhand)

Singles
- Career titles: 1
- Highest ranking: No. 36 (1978)

Grand Slam singles results
- French Open: 3R (1976, 1978)
- Wimbledon: 4R (1977)
- US Open: 2R (1974, 1976)

Doubles
- Career titles: 1
- Last updated on: 26 July 2015.

Mariana Simionescu (born 27 November 1956) is a retired tennis player from Romania.

== Career ==
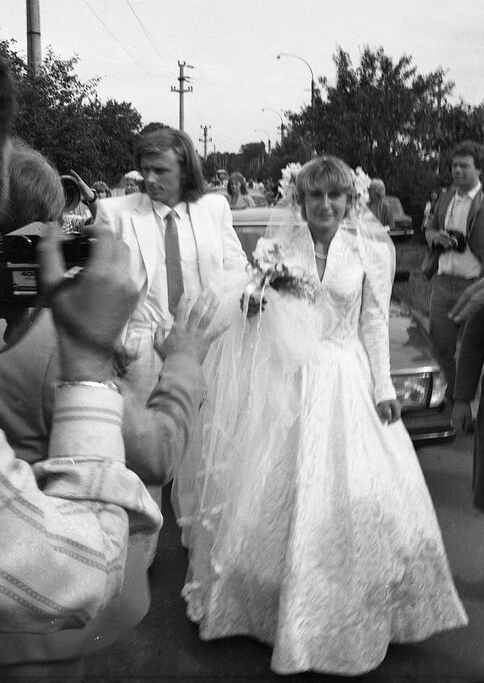
Borg and Simionescu in Snagov, Romania, on 24 July 1980

Simionescu won the French Junior Championships in 1974. She played on the WTA Tour from 1973 to 1980. Her best Grand Slam performance was reaching the fourth round at Wimbledon in 1977. She won one singles title and one doubles title. She reached a career-high singles ranking of world no. 36 in 1978.

Simionescu married Björn Borg on 24 July 1980, but the marriage ended in 1984. She never remarried, but lived for a few years with former F1 racer Jean-Louis Schlesser, with whom she has a son.

== WTA Tour finals ==
=== Singles: 2 (1–1) ===
Winner — Legend Grand Slam tournaments (0–0) WTA Tour Championships (0–0) Virginia Slims, Avon, Other (1–1)	Titles by surface Hard (0–0) Grass (0–0) Clay (1–1) Carpet (0–0)

Outcome	No.	Date	Tournament	Surface	Opponent	Score
Runner-up	1.	18 August 1975	South Orange	Clay	(Romania) Virginia Ruzici	6–1, 6–1
Winner	1.	20 October 1980	Tokyo	Clay	(Australia) Nerida Gregory	6–4, 6–4

=== Doubles: 4 (1–3) ===
Winner — Legend Grand Slam tournaments (0–0) WTA Tour Championships (0–0) Virginia Slims, Avon, Other (1–3)	Titles by surface Hard (0–0) Grass (0–0) Clay (1–2) Carpet (0–1)

Outcome	No.	Date	Tournament	Surface	Partner	Opponents	Score
Runner-up	1.	11 November 1973	London	Carpet	(Romania) Virginia Ruzici	(United Kingdom) Lesley Charles (United Kingdom) Glynis Coles	6–3, 7–5
Runner-up	2.	8 March 1976	Tallahassee	Clay	(Romania) Virginia Ruzici	(United States) Julie Anthony (Australia) Dianne Fromholtz	6–2, 7–5
Runner-up	3.	23 May 1976	Rome	Clay	(Romania) Virginia Ruzici	(South Africa) Linky Boshoff (South Africa) Ilana Kloss	6–1, 6–2
Winner	1.	27 February 1978	Fort Lauderdale	Clay	(Australia) Lesley Hunt	(United States) Diane Desfor (United States) Barbara Hallquist	1–6, 7–6, 6–3

== Grand Slam singles tournament timeline ==
Key
W	F	SF	QF	#R	RR	Q#	DNQ	A	NH

(W) winner; (F) finalist; (SF) semifinalist; (QF) quarterfinalist; (#R) rounds 4, 3, 2, 1; (RR) round-robin stage; (Q#) qualification round; (DNQ) did not qualify; (A) absent; (NH) not held; (SR) strike rate (events won / competed); (W–L) win–loss record.

Tournament	1973	1974	1975	1976	1977		1978	1979	1980	Career SR
Australian Open	A	A	A	A	A	A	A	A	A	0 / 0
French Open	1R	2R	1R	3R	A		3R	1R	2R	0 / 7
Wimbledon	1R	2R	1R	1R	4R		2R	2R	A	0 / 7
US Open	A	2R	A	2R	A		1R	A	1R	0 / 4
SR	0 / 2	0 / 3	0 / 2	0 / 3	0 / 1		0 / 3	0 / 2	0 / 2	0 / 18
Year-end ranking			79	45	68		59	172	79	

- Note: The Australian Open was held twice in 1977, in January and December.
