= 1975 French Open =

- Date: 4–15 June 1975
- Edition: 74
- Category: 45th Grand Slam (ITF)
- Draw: 128MS / 64WS / 64MD / 32WD / 32X
- Surface: Clay / outdoor
- Location: Paris (XVI^{e}), France
- Venue: Stade Roland Garros

Champions

Men's singles
- (Sweden) Björn Borg

Women's singles
- (United States) Chris Evert

Men's doubles
- (United States) Brian Gottfried / (Mexico) Raúl Ramírez

Women's doubles
- (United States) Chris Evert / (Czechoslovakia) Martina Navratilova

Mixed doubles
- (Uruguay) Fiorella Bonicelli / (Brazil) Thomaz Koch
- French Open

The 1975 French Open was a tennis tournament that took place on the outdoor clay courts at the Stade Roland Garros in Paris, France. The tournament ran from 4 June until 15 June. It was the 74th staging of the French Open, and the second Grand Slam tennis event of 1975. Björn Borg won the men's singles title and Chris Evert won the women's single title.

== Finals ==
=== Men's singles ===
(Sweden) Björn Borg defeated (Argentina) Guillermo Vilas, 6–2, 6–3, 6–4

- It was Borg's 2nd career Grand Slam title, and his 2nd (consecutive) French Open title.

=== Women's singles ===
(United States) Chris Evert defeated (Czechoslovakia) Martina Navratilova, 2–6, 6–2, 6–1

- It was Evert's 3rd career Grand Slam title, and her 2nd (consecutive) French Open title.

=== Men's doubles ===
(United States) Brian Gottfried / (Mexico) Raúl Ramírez defeated (Australia) John Alexander / (Australia) Phil Dent, 6–4, 2–6, 6–2, 6–4

=== Women's doubles ===
(United States) Chris Evert / (Czechoslovakia) Martina Navratilova defeated (United States) Julie Anthony / (Soviet Union) Olga Morozova, 6–3, 6–2

=== Mixed doubles ===
(Uruguay) Fiorella Bonicelli / (Brazil) Thomaz Koch defeated (United States) Pam Teeguarden / (Chile) Jaime Fillol, 6–4, 7–6

== Prize money ==
Event		W	F	SF	QF	4R	3R	2R	1R
Singles	Men	FF120,000	FF60,000	FF30,000	FF15,000	FF7,500	FF4,500	FF2,000	FF1,000
Singles	Women	FF40,000	FF20,000	FF10,000	FF5,000	-	FF3,000	FF1,500	FF1,000

Preceded by 1975 Australian Open	Grand Slams	Succeeded by 1975 Wimbledon Championships
