= 1976 WTA Tour =

Women's tennis circuit

- Chris Evert finished the year as world No. 1 for the second time in her career. She won twelve singles tournaments during the season, including two majors at the Wimbledon Championships and the US Open.

Details
- Duration: 26 December 1975–2 December 1976
- Edition: 4th
- Tournaments: 38
- Categories: Grand Slam (4); Virginia Slims championships Virginia Slims Circuit (10); Women's International Grand Prix (10); Non-tour events (12)

Achievements (singles)
- Most titles: (United States) Chris Evert (12)
- Most finals: (United States) Chris Evert (16)
- Prize money leader: (United States) Chris Evert ($343,165)
- Points leader: (United States) Chris Evert (16.990)

The 1976 WTA Tour consisted of a number of tennis tournaments for female tennis players. It was composed of the newly streamlined version of the Virginia Slims Circuit, was now an 11-week tour of the United States, and the Woman's International Grand Prix. The 1976 tour was the first full season using the official ranking system and these rankings were used to determine acceptance into the tournaments.

== Schedule ==
This is a calendar of all events which were part of either the Virginia Slims circuit or the Women's International Grand Prix in the year 1976, with player progression documented from the quarterfinals stage. Also included are the Grand Slam tournaments, the 1976 Virginia Slims Championships, the 1976 Federation Cup and a number of events not affiliated with either tour.

Key

Grand Slam tournaments
Virginia Slims Championships
Virginia Slims Circuit
Women's International Grand Prix
Non-tour events
Team events

=== January ===
Week	Tournament	Champions	Runners-up	Semifinalists	Quarterfinalists
26 Dec	Australian Open; Melbourne, Australia; Grand Slam; Grass – 56S/24D; Singles – Doubles	(Australia) Evonne Goolagong Cawley; 6–3, 6–2	(Czechoslovakia) Renáta Tomanová	(Australia) Helen Gourlay Cawley (Sweden) Elisabeth Ekblom	(Australia) Lesley Bowrey (West Germany) Heidi Eisterlehner (West Germany) Helga Masthoff (Australia) Christine Matison
26 Dec	Australian Open; Melbourne, Australia; Grand Slam; Grass – 56S/24D; Singles – Doubles	(Australia) Evonne Goolagong Cawley (Australia) Helen Gourlay Cawley; 8–1	(Australia) Lesley Turner Bowrey (Czechoslovakia) Renáta Tomanová	(Australia) Helen Gourlay Cawley (Sweden) Elisabeth Ekblom	(Australia) Lesley Bowrey (West Germany) Heidi Eisterlehner (West Germany) Helga Masthoff (Australia) Christine Matison
12 Jan	Virginia Slims of Houston; Houston, United States; Virginia Slims; Carpet (i) – $75,000 – 32S/12D	(United States) Martina Navratilova; 6–3, 6–4	(United States) Chris Evert	(United States) Rosie Casals (United States) Nancy Gunter	(United Kingdom) Sue Barker (Soviet Union) Olga Morozova (United States) Marcie Louie (Czechoslovakia) Renáta Tomanová
12 Jan	Virginia Slims of Houston; Houston, United States; Virginia Slims; Carpet (i) – $75,000 – 32S/12D	(France) Françoise Dürr (United States) Rosie Casals; 6–0, 7–5	(United States) Martina Navratilova (United States) Chris Evert	(United States) Rosie Casals (United States) Nancy Gunter	(United Kingdom) Sue Barker (Soviet Union) Olga Morozova (United States) Marcie Louie (Czechoslovakia) Renáta Tomanová
19 Jan	Virginia Slims of Washington; Washington, United States; Virginia Slims; Carpet (i) – $75,000 – 32S/8D	(United States) Chris Evert; 6–2, 6–1	(United Kingdom) Virginia Wade	(United Kingdom) Sue Barker (United States) Terry Holladay	(Socialist Federal Republic of Yugoslavia) Mima Jaušovec (Soviet Union) Olga Morozova (Australia) Lesley Hunt (Soviet Union) Natasha Chmyreva
19 Jan	Virginia Slims of Washington; Washington, United States; Virginia Slims; Carpet (i) – $75,000 – 32S/8D	(Soviet Union) Olga Morozova (United Kingdom) Virginia Wade; 7–6, 6–2	(United States) Wendy Overton (United States) Mona Guerrant	(United Kingdom) Sue Barker (United States) Terry Holladay	(Socialist Federal Republic of Yugoslavia) Mima Jaušovec (Soviet Union) Olga Morozova (Australia) Lesley Hunt (Soviet Union) Natasha Chmyreva
26 Jan	Virginia Slims of Chicago; Chicago, United States; Virginia Slims; Carpet (i) – $75,000 – 32S/10D	(Australia) Evonne Goolagong Cawley; 3–6, 6–4, 6–2	(United Kingdom) Virginia Wade	(United States) Martina Navratilova (United States) Nancy Gunter	(Australia) Cynthia Doerner (Soviet Union) Olga Morozova (Soviet Union) Natasha Chmyreva (United States) Wendy Overton
26 Jan	Virginia Slims of Chicago; Chicago, United States; Virginia Slims; Carpet (i) – $75,000 – 32S/10D	(Soviet Union) Olga Morozova (United Kingdom) Virginia Wade; 6–7^{(4–5)}, 6–4, 6–4	(Australia) Evonne Goolagong Cawley (United States) Martina Navratilova	(United States) Martina Navratilova (United States) Nancy Gunter	(Australia) Cynthia Doerner (Soviet Union) Olga Morozova (Soviet Union) Natasha Chmyreva (United States) Wendy Overton

=== February ===
Week	Tournament	Champions	Runners-up	Semifinalists	Quarterfinalists
3 Feb	Virginia Slims of Akron; Akron, United States; Virginia Slims; Carpet (i) – $75,000 – 32S	(Australia) Evonne Goolagong Cawley; 6–2, 3–6, 6–2	(United Kingdom) Virginia Wade	(United States) Rosie Casals (Soviet Union) Olga Morozova	(West Germany) Iris Riedel (United States) Nancy Gunter (Socialist Federal Republic of Yugoslavia) Mima Jaušovec (United Kingdom) Sue Barker
3 Feb	Virginia Slims of Akron; Akron, United States; Virginia Slims; Carpet (i) – $75,000 – 32S	(South Africa) Brigitte Cuypers (United States) Mona Guerrant; 6–4, 7–6^{(5–4)}	(United Kingdom) Glynis Coles (Romania) Florența Mihai	(United States) Rosie Casals (Soviet Union) Olga Morozova	(West Germany) Iris Riedel (United States) Nancy Gunter (Socialist Federal Republic of Yugoslavia) Mima Jaušovec (United Kingdom) Sue Barker
17 Feb	Virginia Slims of Detroit; Detroit, United States; Virginia Slims; Carpet (i) – $75,000 – 32S	(United States) Chris Evert; 6–4, 6–2	(United States) Rosie Casals	(United States) Terry Holladay (United States) Marita Redondo	(Netherlands) Elly Appel-Vessies (United States) Marcie Louie (Netherlands) Betty Stöve (United States) Ann Kiyomura
17 Feb	Virginia Slims of Detroit; Detroit, United States; Virginia Slims; Carpet (i) – $75,000 – 32S	(United States) Mona Guerrant (United States) Ann Kiyomura; 6–3, 6–4	(United States) Chris Evert (Netherlands) Betty Stöve	(United States) Terry Holladay (United States) Marita Redondo	(Netherlands) Elly Appel-Vessies (United States) Marcie Louie (Netherlands) Betty Stöve (United States) Ann Kiyomura
24 Feb	Virginia Slims of Sarasota; Sarasota, United States; Virginia Slims; Carpet (i) – $75,000 – 32S	(United States) Chris Evert; 6–3, 6–0	(Australia) Evonne Goolagong Cawley	(United States) Martina Navratilova (United States) Rosie Casals	(United States) Carrie Meyer (United States) Mona Guerrant (Socialist Federal Republic of Yugoslavia) Mima Jaušovec (Australia) Lesley Hunt
24 Feb	Virginia Slims of Sarasota; Sarasota, United States; Virginia Slims; Carpet (i) – $75,000 – 32S	(United States) Martina Navratilova (Netherlands) Betty Stöve; 6–1, 6–0	(United States) Mona Guerrant (United States) Ann Kiyomura	(United States) Martina Navratilova (United States) Rosie Casals	(United States) Carrie Meyer (United States) Mona Guerrant (Socialist Federal Republic of Yugoslavia) Mima Jaušovec (Australia) Lesley Hunt

=== March ===
Week	Tournament	Champions	Runners-up	Semifinalists	Quarterfinalists
1 Mar	Virginia Slims of San Francisco; San Francisco, United States; Virginia Slims; Carpet (i) – $75,000 – 32S/8D	(United States) Chris Evert; 7–5, 7–6^{(5–2)}	(Australia) Evonne Goolagong Cawley	(United States) Terry Holladay (United States) Marita Redondo	(United States) Rosie Casals (United States) Martina Navratilova (United Kingdom) Virginia Wade (United States) Nancy Gunter
1 Mar	Virginia Slims of San Francisco; San Francisco, United States; Virginia Slims; Carpet (i) – $75,000 – 32S/8D	(United States) Billie Jean King (Netherlands) Betty Stöve; 6–4, 6–1	(United States) Rosie Casals (France) Françoise Dürr	(United States) Terry Holladay (United States) Marita Redondo	(United States) Rosie Casals (United States) Martina Navratilova (United Kingdom) Virginia Wade (United States) Nancy Gunter
15 Mar	Virginia Slims of Dallas; Dallas, United States; Virginia Slims; Carpet (i) – $75,000 – 32S/10D	(Australia) Evonne Goolagong Cawley; 6–1, 6–1	(United States) Martina Navratilova	(Australia) Kerry Reid (United States) Marita Redondo	(South Africa) Greer Stevens (Netherlands) Betty Stöve (United States) Carrie Meyer (Soviet Union) Natasha Chmyreva
15 Mar	Virginia Slims of Dallas; Dallas, United States; Virginia Slims; Carpet (i) – $75,000 – 32S/10D	(United States) Mona Guerrant (United States) Ann Kiyomura; 6–3, 4–6, 6–4	(South Africa) Greer Stevens (United States) Marita Redondo	(Australia) Kerry Reid (United States) Marita Redondo	(South Africa) Greer Stevens (Netherlands) Betty Stöve (United States) Carrie Meyer (Soviet Union) Natasha Chmyreva
22 Mar	Virginia Slims of Boston; Boston, United States; Virginia Slims; Carpet (i) – $75,000 – 32S/12D	(Australia) Evonne Goolagong Cawley; 6–2, 6–0	(United Kingdom) Virginia Wade	(United States) Rosie Casals (Australia) Dianne Fromholtz	(Australia) Kerry Reid (Australia) Lesley Hunt (Soviet Union) Natasha Chmyreva (Socialist Federal Republic of Yugoslavia) Mima Jaušovec
22 Mar	Virginia Slims of Boston; Boston, United States; Virginia Slims; Carpet (i) – $75,000 – 32S/12D	(United States) Mona Guerrant (United States) Ann Kiyomura; 3–6, 6–1, 7–5	(United States) Rosie Casals (France) Françoise Dürr	(United States) Rosie Casals (Australia) Dianne Fromholtz	(Australia) Kerry Reid (Australia) Lesley Hunt (Soviet Union) Natasha Chmyreva (Socialist Federal Republic of Yugoslavia) Mima Jaušovec
29 Mar	Virginia Slims of Philadelphia; Philadelphia, United States; Virginia Slims; Carpet (i) – $75,000 – 32S/11D	(Australia) Evonne Goolagong Cawley; 6–3, 7–6^{(5–3)}	(United States) Chris Evert	(United Kingdom) Virginia Wade (United Kingdom) Sue Barker	(Australia) Dianne Fromholtz (Soviet Union) Olga Morozova (Australia) Kerry Reid (United States) Rosie Casals
29 Mar	Virginia Slims of Philadelphia; Philadelphia, United States; Virginia Slims; Carpet (i) – $75,000 – 32S/11D	(United States) Billie Jean King (Netherlands) Betty Stöve; 7–6^{(5–4)}, 6–4	(United States) Rosie Casals (France) Françoise Dürr	(United Kingdom) Virginia Wade (United Kingdom) Sue Barker	(Australia) Dianne Fromholtz (Soviet Union) Olga Morozova (Australia) Kerry Reid (United States) Rosie Casals

=== April ===
Week	Tournament	Champions	Runners-up	Semifinalists	Quarterfinalists
12 April	Virginia Slims Championships; Los Angeles, United States; Year-end championships Carpet (i) – $150,000 – 16S (8RR)	(Australia) Evonne Goolagong Cawley; 6–3, 5–7, 6–3	(United States) Chris Evert	(United States) Rosie Casals (3rd) (United States) Martina Navratilova (4th)	(United Kingdom) Sue Barker (5th) (United States) Marita Redondo (6th) (United Kingdom) Virginia Wade (7th) (France) Françoise Dürr (8th)
12 April	Monte Carlo Open; Monte Carlo, Monaco; Non-tour event Clay	(West Germany) Helga Masthoff; 6–4, 6–2	(Uruguay) Fiorella Bonicelli		
12 April	Monte Carlo Open; Monte Carlo, Monaco; Non-tour event Clay	(West Germany) Katja Ebbinghaus (West Germany) Helga Masthoff; 6–3, 7–5	(France) Rosie Darmon (France) Gail Sherriff Chanfreau		
19 April	Bridgestone Doubles Championships; Osaka & Tokyo, Japan; Women's International Grand Prix $100,000 – Carpet (i) – 7D	(United States) Billie Jean King (Netherlands) Betty Stöve; 6–3, 6–2	(United States) Mona Guerrant (United States) Ann Kiyomura	(United States) Evert / (Czechoslovakia) Navrátilová (Soviet Union) Morozova / (United Kingdom) Wade	/ (United Kingdom) Coles / (Romania) Mihai (Australia) Sieler / (Australia) Hunt (United States) Casals / (France) Dürr
26 April	Family Circle Cup; Amelia Island, United States; Women's International Grand Prix; Clay – $110,000 – 32S/16D	(United States) Chris Evert; 6–2, 6–2	(Australia) Kerry Reid	(United States) Mary Struthers (United Kingdom) Sue Barker	(Netherlands) Betty Stöve (Australia) Lesley Hunt (South Africa) Ilana Kloss (United States) Nancy Gunter
26 April	Family Circle Cup; Amelia Island, United States; Women's International Grand Prix; Clay – $110,000 – 32S/16D	(South Africa) Linky Boshoff (South Africa) Ilana Kloss; 6–3, 6–2	(United States) Kathy Kuykendall (United States) Valerie Ziegenfuss	(United States) Mary Struthers (United Kingdom) Sue Barker	(Netherlands) Betty Stöve (Australia) Lesley Hunt (South Africa) Ilana Kloss (United States) Nancy Gunter

=== May ===
Week	Tournament	Champions	Runners-up	Semifinalists	Quarterfinalists
10 May	Coca-Cola British Hard Court; Championships; Bournemouth, Great Britain; Non-tour event Clay	(West Germany) Helga Niessen Masthoff; 5–7, 6–3, 6–3	(United Kingdom) Sue Barker	(France) Gail Lovera (South Africa) Linky Boshoff	(United Kingdom) Linda Mottram (United Kingdom) Belinda Thompson (United Kingdom) Glynis Coles (Australia) Wendy Turnbull
10 May	Coca-Cola British Hard Court; Championships; Bournemouth, Great Britain; Non-tour event Clay	(South Africa) Linky Boshoff (South Africa) Ilana Kloss; 6–3, 6–2	(United Kingdom) Lesley Charles (United Kingdom) Sue Mappin	(France) Gail Lovera (South Africa) Linky Boshoff	(United Kingdom) Linda Mottram (United Kingdom) Belinda Thompson (United Kingdom) Glynis Coles (Australia) Wendy Turnbull
17 May	German Open; Hamburg, West Germany; Women's International Grand Prix; Clay – $30,000	(United Kingdom) Sue Barker; 6–3, 6–1	(Czechoslovakia) Renáta Tomanová	(Romania) Virginia Ruzici (Socialist Federal Republic of Yugoslavia) Mima Jaušovec	(West Germany) Iris Riedel (West Germany) Helga Niessen Masthoff (United Kingdom) Glynis Coles (Czechoslovakia) Regina Maršíková
17 May	German Open; Hamburg, West Germany; Women's International Grand Prix; Clay – $30,000	(South Africa) Linky Boshoff (South Africa) Ilana Kloss; 4–6, 7–5, 6–1	(United States) Laura duPont (Australia) Wendy Turnbull	(Romania) Virginia Ruzici (Socialist Federal Republic of Yugoslavia) Mima Jaušovec	(West Germany) Iris Riedel (West Germany) Helga Niessen Masthoff (United Kingdom) Glynis Coles (Czechoslovakia) Regina Maršíková
24 May	Italian Open; Rome, Italy; Women's International Grand Prix; Clay – $30,000	(Socialist Federal Republic of Yugoslavia) Mima Jaušovec; 6–1, 6–3	(Australia) Lesley Hunt	(Czechoslovakia) Regina Maršíková (Romania) Florența Mihai	(United Kingdom) Sue Barker (South Africa) Linky Boshoff (France) Gail Lovera (United States) Beth Norton
24 May	Italian Open; Rome, Italy; Women's International Grand Prix; Clay – $30,000	(South Africa) Linky Boshoff (South Africa) Ilana Kloss; 6–1, 6–2	(Romania) Virginia Ruzici (Romania) Mariana Simionescu	(Czechoslovakia) Regina Maršíková (Romania) Florența Mihai	(United Kingdom) Sue Barker (South Africa) Linky Boshoff (France) Gail Lovera (United States) Beth Norton
31 May; 7 June	French Open; Paris, France; Grand Slam; Clay (red) – 64S/22D/24X; Singles – Doubles – Mixed doubles	(United Kingdom) Sue Barker; 6–2, 0–6, 6–2	(Czechoslovakia) Renáta Tomanová	(Romania) Florența Mihai (Romania) Virginia Ruzici	(West Germany) Helga Niessen Masthoff (United States) Kathy Kuykendall (Czechoslovakia) Miloslava Holubová (Czechoslovakia) Regina Maršíková
31 May; 7 June	French Open; Paris, France; Grand Slam; Clay (red) – 64S/22D/24X; Singles – Doubles – Mixed doubles	(Uruguay) Fiorella Bonicelli (France) Gail Lovera; 6–3, 6–2	(United States) Kathleen Harter (West Germany) Helga Niessen Masthoff	(Romania) Florența Mihai (Romania) Virginia Ruzici	(West Germany) Helga Niessen Masthoff (United States) Kathy Kuykendall (Czechoslovakia) Miloslava Holubová (Czechoslovakia) Regina Maršíková
31 May; 7 June	French Open; Paris, France; Grand Slam; Clay (red) – 64S/22D/24X; Singles – Doubles – Mixed doubles	(South Africa) Ilana Kloss (Australia) Kim Warwick; 5–7, 7–6, 6–2	(South Africa) Linky Boshoff (Rhodesia) Colin Dowdeswell	(Romania) Florența Mihai (Romania) Virginia Ruzici	(West Germany) Helga Niessen Masthoff (United States) Kathy Kuykendall (Czechoslovakia) Miloslava Holubová (Czechoslovakia) Regina Maršíková

=== June ===
Week	Tournament	Champions	Runners-up	Semifinalists	Quarterfinalists
14 Jun	Colgate International; Eastbourne, Great Britain; Women's International Grand Prix; Grass – $25,000	(United States) Chris Evert; 8–6, 6–3	(United Kingdom) Virginia Wade	(Soviet Union) Olga Morozova (United States) Martina Navratilova	(Netherlands) Betty Stöve (United States) Rosie Casals (United States) Betsy Nagelsen (United States) Mona Guerrant
14 Jun	Colgate International; Eastbourne, Great Britain; Women's International Grand Prix; Grass – $25,000	(United States) Chris Evert / (United States) Martina Navratilova vs (Soviet Union) Olga Morozova / (United Kingdom) Virginia Wade; 6–1, 1–1 not finished due to rain		(Soviet Union) Olga Morozova (United States) Martina Navratilova	(Netherlands) Betty Stöve (United States) Rosie Casals (United States) Betsy Nagelsen (United States) Mona Guerrant
21 Jun; 28 Jun	Wimbledon Championships; London, Great Britain; Grand Slam; Grass – 96S/48D/64X; Singles – Doubles – Mixed doubles	(United States) Chris Evert; 6–3, 4–6, 8–6	(Australia) Evonne Goolagong Cawley	(United States) Martina Navratilova (United Kingdom) Virginia Wade	(Soviet Union) Olga Morozova (United Kingdom) Sue Barker (Australia) Kerry Reid (United States) Rosie Casals
21 Jun; 28 Jun	Wimbledon Championships; London, Great Britain; Grand Slam; Grass – 96S/48D/64X; Singles – Doubles – Mixed doubles	(United States) Chris Evert (United States) Martina Navratilova; 6–1, 3–6, 7–5	(United States) Billie Jean King (Netherlands) Betty Stöve	(United States) Martina Navratilova (United Kingdom) Virginia Wade	(Soviet Union) Olga Morozova (United Kingdom) Sue Barker (Australia) Kerry Reid (United States) Rosie Casals
21 Jun; 28 Jun	Wimbledon Championships; London, Great Britain; Grand Slam; Grass – 96S/48D/64X; Singles – Doubles – Mixed doubles	(France) Françoise Dürr (Australia) Tony Roche; 6–3, 2–6, 7–5	(United States) Rosie Casals (Australia) Dick Stockton	(United States) Martina Navratilova (United Kingdom) Virginia Wade	(Soviet Union) Olga Morozova (United Kingdom) Sue Barker (Australia) Kerry Reid (United States) Rosie Casals

=== July ===
Week	Tournament	Champions	Runners-up	Semifinalists	Quarterfinalists
5 Jul	Swiss Open; Gstaad, Switzerland; Non-tour event Clay	(Belgium) Michele Gurdal; 4-6, 6–2, 6–3	(France) Gail Chanfreau		
5 Jul	Swiss Open; Gstaad, Switzerland; Non-tour event Clay	(United States) Betsy Nagelsen (Australia) Wendy Turnbull; 6–4, 6–4	(South Africa) Brigitte Cuypers (South Africa) Annette DuPlooy		
5 Jul	Swedish Open; Båstad, Sweden; Non-tour event Clay	(Czechoslovakia) Renáta Tomanová; 6–3, 6–2	(Sweden) Helena Anliot		
5 Jul	Swedish Open; Båstad, Sweden; Non-tour event Clay	(Colombia) Isabel Fernández de Soto (Sweden) Mimmi Wikstedt; 6–1, 7–6	(Australia) Lesley Hunt (Czechoslovakia) Renáta Tomanová		
12 Jul	Head Open; Kitzbühel, Austria; Non-tour event Clay	(Australia) Wendy Turnbull; 6–4, 5–7, 6–2	(Romania) Virginia Ruzici		
12 Jul	Head Open; Kitzbühel, Austria; Non-tour event Clay	(Sweden) Helena Anliot (Sweden) Mimmi Wikstedt; 6–4, 2–6, 7–5	(West Germany) Katja Ebbinghaus (West Germany) Heidi Eisterlehner		

=== August ===
Week	Tournament	Champions	Runners-up	Semifinalists	Quarterfinalists
9 Aug	US Clay Court Championships; Indianapolis, United States; Women's International Grand Prix; Clay – $35,000	(United States) Kathy May; 6–4, 4–6, 6–2	(South Africa) Brigitte Cuypers	(Uruguay) Fiorella Bonicelli (West Germany) Helga Niessen Masthoff	(Australia) Lesley Hunt (United States) Laura duPont (United States) Mary Struthers (South Africa) Linky Boshoff
9 Aug	US Clay Court Championships; Indianapolis, United States; Women's International Grand Prix; Clay – $35,000	(Uruguay) Fiorella Bonicelli (Colombia) Isabel Fernández de Soto; 3–6, 7–5, 6–3	(France) Gail Chanfreau (United States) Julie Heldman	(Uruguay) Fiorella Bonicelli (West Germany) Helga Niessen Masthoff	(Australia) Lesley Hunt (United States) Laura duPont (United States) Mary Struthers (South Africa) Linky Boshoff
16 Aug	Rothmans Canadian Open; Toronto, Canada; Women's International Grand Prix; Clay – $35,000	(Socialist Federal Republic of Yugoslavia) Mima Jaušovec; 6–2, 6–0	(Australia) Lesley Hunt	(Romania) Virginia Ruzici (Australia) Cynthia Doerner	(United Kingdom) Sue Barker (United States) Kathy May (Czechoslovakia) Regina Maršíková (United States) Laura duPont
16 Aug	Rothmans Canadian Open; Toronto, Canada; Women's International Grand Prix; Clay – $35,000	(Australia) Cynthia Doerner (United States) Janet Newberry; 6–7, 6–3, 6–1	(United States) Sue Barker (United States) Pam Teeguarden	(Romania) Virginia Ruzici (Australia) Cynthia Doerner	(United Kingdom) Sue Barker (United States) Kathy May (Czechoslovakia) Regina Maršíková (United States) Laura duPont
16 Aug	WTA Westchester Invitational; Harrison, United States; Non-tour event Clay	(United States) Beth Norton; 1–6, 7–5, 6–3	(United States) Ruta Gerulaitis	(United States) Janet Newberry (United States) Mary Carillo	(United States) Laura duPont (United States) Janice Metcalf (United States) Cecilia Martinez (United States) Wendy Overton
23 Aug	Federation Cup; Philadelphia, United States; Federation Cup; Carpet (i) – 31 teams knockout	United States; 2–1	Australia	Netherlands; Great Britain	Switzerland; Denmark; South Africa; West Germany
23 Aug	Tennis Week Open; Orange, United States; Non-tour event Clay	(South Africa) Marise Kruger; 6–3, 6–2	(United States) Lea Antonoplis	(France) Florence Guédy (United States) Renée Richards	(United States) Linda Thomas (United States) Susan Mehmedbasich (United States) Carrie Meyer (United States) Kathy Harter
30 Aug; 6 Sep	US Open; New York City, United States; Grand Slam; Clay – 64S/32D/32X; Singles – Doubles – Mixed doubles	(United States) Chris Evert; 6–3, 6–0	(Australia) Evonne Goolagong Cawley	(Socialist Federal Republic of Yugoslavia) Mima Jaušovec (Australia) Dianne Fromholtz	(Soviet Union) Natasha Chmyreva (Romania) Virginia Ruzici (United States) Zenda Liess (United States) Rosie Casals
30 Aug; 6 Sep	US Open; New York City, United States; Grand Slam; Clay – 64S/32D/32X; Singles – Doubles – Mixed doubles	(South Africa) Linky Boshoff (South Africa) Ilana Kloss; 6–1, 6–4	(Soviet Union) Olga Morozova (United Kingdom) Virginia Wade	(Socialist Federal Republic of Yugoslavia) Mima Jaušovec (Australia) Dianne Fromholtz	(Soviet Union) Natasha Chmyreva (Romania) Virginia Ruzici (United States) Zenda Liess (United States) Rosie Casals
30 Aug; 6 Sep	US Open; New York City, United States; Grand Slam; Clay – 64S/32D/32X; Singles – Doubles – Mixed doubles	(United States) Billie Jean King (Australia) Phil Dent; 3–6, 6–2, 7–5	(Netherlands) Betty Stöve (South Africa) Frew McMillan	(Socialist Federal Republic of Yugoslavia) Mima Jaušovec (Australia) Dianne Fromholtz	(Soviet Union) Natasha Chmyreva (Romania) Virginia Ruzici (United States) Zenda Liess (United States) Rosie Casals

=== September ===
Week	Tournament	Champions	Runners-up	Semifinalists	Quarterfinalists
13 Sep	US Indoor Championships; Atlanta, United States; Women's International Grand Prix; Carpet (i) – $75,000	(United Kingdom) Virginia Wade; 5–7, 7–5, 7–5	(Netherlands) Betty Stöve	(Australia) Dianne Fromholtz (Australia) Wendy Turnbull	(United Kingdom) Winnie Shaw (South Africa) Marise Kruger (South Africa) Brigitte Cuypers (United States) JoAnne Russell
13 Sep	US Indoor Championships; Atlanta, United States; Women's International Grand Prix; Carpet (i) – $75,000	(United States) Rosie Casals (France) Françoise Dürr; 6–0, 6–4	(Netherlands) Betty Stöve (United Kingdom) Virginia Wade	(Australia) Dianne Fromholtz (Australia) Wendy Turnbull	(United Kingdom) Winnie Shaw (South Africa) Marise Kruger (South Africa) Brigitte Cuypers (United States) JoAnne Russell
27 Sep	Toray Sillook Open; Tokyo, Japan; Non-tour event Carpet (i) – $50,000	(Netherlands) Betty Stöve; 1–6, 6–4, 6–3	(Australia) Margaret Court	(United States) Valerie Ziegenfuss (3rd) (Australia) Lesley Hunt (4th)	(United States) Betsy Nagelsen (United States) Rayni Fox (United Kingdom) Virginia Wade (United States) Marita Redondo

=== October ===
Week	Tournament	Champions	Runners-up	Semifinalists	Quarterfinalists
4 Oct	Thunderbird Classic; Phoenix, United States; Women's International Grand Prix; Hard – $60,000	(United States) Chris Evert; 6–1, 7–5	(Australia) Dianne Fromholtz	(Netherlands) Betty Stöve (United States) Martina Navratilova	(United States) Terry Holladay (United States) JoAnne Russell (United States) Billie Jean King (United States) Mona Guerrant
4 Oct	Thunderbird Classic; Phoenix, United States; Women's International Grand Prix; Hard – $60,000	(United States) Billie Jean King (Netherlands) Betty Stöve; 6–2, 6–1	(South Africa) Linky Boshoff (South Africa) Ilana Kloss	(Netherlands) Betty Stöve (United States) Martina Navratilova	(United States) Terry Holladay (United States) JoAnne Russell (United States) Billie Jean King (United States) Mona Guerrant
11 Oct	World Invitational Tennis Classic; Hilton Head Island, United States; Non-tour event Clay	(Australia) Evonne Goolagong Cawley; 6–3, 6–4	(United Kingdom) Virginia Wade		
11 Oct	World Invitational Tennis Classic; Hilton Head Island, United States; Non-tour event Clay	(United Kingdom) Sue Barker (Australia) Evonne Goolagong Cawley; 6–4, 4–6, 6–3	(United States) Martina Navratilova (United Kingdom) Virginia Wade		

=== November ===
Week	Tournament	Champions	Runners-up	Semifinalists	Quarterfinalists
1 Nov	Japan Open; Tokyo, Japan; Non-tour event Clay	(Australia) Wendy Turnbull; 6–1, 6–1	(Belgium) Michele Gurdal		
1 Nov	Wightman Cup; Crystal Palace, London, Great Britain; Hard (i); Team event	United States; 5–2	Great Britain		
25 Nov	Gunze World Tennis; Tokyo & Kobe, Japan; Non-tour event Hard (i) – $100,000	(United States) Chris Evert; 6–2, 7–6^{(7–4)}	(United Kingdom) Sue Barker	(United States) Rosie Casals (United States) Martina Navratilova	(Czechoslovakia) Renáta Tomanová (France) Françoise Dürr (United States) Ann Kiyomura (United States) Jeanne Evert
25 Nov	Gunze World Tennis; Tokyo & Kobe, Japan; Non-tour event Hard (i) – $100,000	(United Kingdom) Sue Barker (United States) Ann Kiyomura; 4–6, 6–3, 6–1	(United States) Rosie Casals (France) Françoise Dürr	(United States) Rosie Casals (United States) Martina Navratilova	(Czechoslovakia) Renáta Tomanová (France) Françoise Dürr (United States) Ann Kiyomura (United States) Jeanne Evert

== Rankings ==
Below are the 1976 WTA year-end rankings (December 31, 1976) Singles competition:

Singles Year-end Ranking
No	Player Name	Points	1975	Change
1	Chris Evert (USA)	16.990	1	=
2	Evonne Goolagong Cawley (AUS)	16.326	5	+3
3	Virginia Wade (GBR)	10.933	2	-1
4	Martina Navratilova (USA)	10.272	3	-1
5	Dianne Fromholtz (AUS)	8.012	20	+15
6	Rosie Casals (USA)	7.644	12	+6
7	Betty Stöve (NED)	7.158	22	+15
8	Kerry Melville (AUS)	7.064	10	+2
9	Olga Morozova (USSR)	6.523	7	-2
10	Sue Barker (GBR)	6.480	19	+9
11	Mima Jaušovec (YUG)	5.702	40	+29
12	Nancy Gunter (USA)	5.525	8	-4
13	Terry Holladay (USA)	4.132	26	+13
14	Natasha Chmyreva (USSR)	5.066	21	+7
15	Françoise Dürr (FRA)	4.639	9	-6
16	Marita Redondo (USA)	4.603	60	+44
17	Greer Stevens (RSA)	4.522	48	+31
18	JoAnne Russell (USA)	4.493	35	+17
19	Kathy May (USA)	4.277	57	+38
20	Mona Guerrant (USA)	4.236	NR	NR

== See also ==
- 1976 Men's Grand Prix circuit
