= 1976 French Open – Women's doubles =

Women's doubles
- 1976 French Open

Final
- Champion: (Uruguay) Fiorella Bonicelli (France) Gail Lovera
- Runner-up: (United States) Kathleen Harter (West Germany) Helga Masthoff
- Score: 6–4, 1–6, 6–3

Events
Singles	men	women		boys	girls
Doubles	men	women	mixed	boys	girls
WC Singles	men	women	quad
WC Doubles	men	women	quad
Legends	−45	45+	women
← 1975 ·	French Open	· 1977 →

Chris Evert and Martina Navratilova were the defending champions but both players chose not to participate.

Fiorella Bonicelli and Gail Lovera won in the final 6–4, 1–6, 6–3 against Kathleen Harter and Helga Masthoff.

== Draw ==
=== Key ===
- Q = Qualifier
- WC = Wild card
- LL = Lucky loser
- Alt = Alternate
- SE = Special exempt
- PR = Protected ranking
- ITF = ITF entry
- JE = Junior exempt
- w/o = Walkover
- r = Retired
- d = Defaulted
- SR = Special ranking

=== Finals ===
Semifinals
(Uruguay) Fiorella Bonicelli (France) Gail Lovera	2	7	6
(Czechoslovakia) Regina Maršíková (Czechoslovakia) Renáta Tomanová	6	5	2
(United States) Kathleen Harter (West Germany) Helga Masthoff	6	3	10
(South Africa) Linky Boshoff (South Africa) Ilana Kloss	2	6	8

Final
(Uruguay) Fiorella Bonicelli (France) Gail Lovera	6	1	6
(United States) Kathleen Harter (West Germany) Helga Masthoff	4	6	3

=== Top half ===
First round
(United States) C Martinez (United States) J Stratton	6	5	3
(Switzerland) SM Villaverde (Argentina) E Weisenberger	1	7	6
(Romania) V Ruzici (Netherlands) E Vessies	6	7
(France) B Simon (France) F Thibault	1	5
(Sweden) H Anliot (Romania) M Simionescu	w/o
(South Africa) B Cuypers (United States) L duPont

Second round
(Uruguay) F Bonicelli (France) G Lovera	6	7
(Switzerland) SM Villaverde (Argentina) E Weisenberger	3	5
(Sweden) I Bentzer (United States) V Ziegenfuss	6	6	4
(Belgium) M Gurdal (Belgium) M Van Haver	3	7	6
(Colombia) I Fernández de Soto (Socialist Federal Republic of Yugoslavia) M Jaušovec	1	6
(Romania) V Ruzici (Netherlands) E Vessies	6	7
(Czechoslovakia) R Maršíková (Czechoslovakia) R Tomanová	4	6	6
(Sweden) H Anliot (Romania) M Simionescu	6	2	1

Quarterfinals
(Uruguay) F Bonicelli (France) G Lovera	6	7
(Belgium) M Gurdal (Belgium) M Van Haver	3	5
(Romania) V Ruzici (Netherlands) E Vessies	2	7	0
(Czechoslovakia) R Maršíková (Czechoslovakia) R Tomanová	6	6	6

Semifinals
(Uruguay) F Bonicelli (France) G Lovera	2	7	6
(Czechoslovakia) R Maršíková (Czechoslovakia) R Tomanová	6	5	2

=== Bottom half ===
First round
(Australia) C Doerner (Australia) W Turnbull	6	6
(France) N Fuchs (France) F Guédy	2	0
(Argentina) P Bianchi (France) S Rual	0	2
(United States) K Kuykendall (Italy) A-M Nasuelli	6	6
(Spain) V Baldovinos (Spain) C Perea	7	4	3
(Czechoslovakia) M Holubová (Australia) C Sherriff	6	6	6

Second round
(Australia) C Doerner (Australia) W Turnbull	6	7
(United Kingdom) S Barker (United Kingdom) M Tyler	2	6
(United States) K Kuykendall (Italy) A-M Nasuelli	2	3
(United States) K Harter (West Germany) H Masthoff	6	6
(United States) S Mehmedbasich (United States) M Redondo	1	3
(United Kingdom) G Coles (Romania) F Mihai	6	6
(Czechoslovakia) M Holubová (Australia) C Sherriff	2	2
(South Africa) L Boshoff (South Africa) I Kloss	6	6

Quarterfinals
(Australia) C Doerner (Australia) W Turnbull	2	2
(United States) K Harter (West Germany) H Masthoff	6	6
(United Kingdom) G Coles (Romania) F Mihai	6	7	7
(South Africa) L Boshoff (South Africa) I Kloss	7	5	9

Semifinals
(United States) K Harter (West Germany) H Masthoff	6	3	10
(South Africa) L Boshoff (South Africa) I Kloss	2	6	8
