= 1976 French Open – Mixed doubles =

Mixed doubles
- 1976 French Open

Final
- Champion: (Australia) Kim Warwick (South Africa) Ilana Kloss
- Runner-up: (Rhodesia) Colin Dowdeswell (South Africa) Linky Boshoff
- Score: 5–7, 7–6, 6–2

Details
- Draw: 27

Events
Singles	men	women		boys	girls
Doubles	men	women	mixed	boys	girls
WC Singles	men	women	quad
WC Doubles	men	women	quad
Legends	−45	45+	women
- French Open

Thomaz Koch and Fiorella Bonicelli were the defending champions but only Fiorella Bonicelli competed that year with Jairo Velasco. Jairo Velasco and Fiorella Bonicelli lost in the quarterfinals to Kim Warwick and Ilana Kloss.

Kim Warwick and Ilana Kloss won in the final 5–7, 7–6, 6–2 against Colin Dowdeswell and Linky Boshoff .

== Draw ==
Key

- Q = Qualifier
- WC = Wild card
- LL = Lucky loser
- Alt = Alternate
- ITF = ITF entry
- PR = Protected ranking
- SR = Special ranking
- SE = Special exempt
- JE = Junior exempt
- JR = Junior Accelerator Programme entrant
- CO = College Accelerator Programme entrant
- NG = Next Gen Accelerator Program entrant
- w/o = Walkover
- r = Retired
- d = Defaulted

=== Finals ===
Semifinals
(Rhodesia) Colin Dowdeswell (South Africa) Linky Boshoff	7	7
(France) Patrice Beust (France) Gail Lovera	6	5
(Australia) Kim Warwick (South Africa) Ilana Kloss	w/o
(France) Patrice Dominguez (United Kingdom) Sue Barker

Final
(Rhodesia) Colin Dowdeswell (South Africa) Linky Boshoff	7	6	2
(Australia) Kim Warwick (South Africa) Ilana Kloss	5	7	6

=== Top half ===
First round
(Bolivia) R Benavides (Argentina) E Weisenberger	3	3
(France) J-L Haillet (Romania) V Ruzici	6	6
(France) J-B Chanfreau (United States) M Redondo	7	7
(Argentina) T Vázquez (Sweden) H Anliot	5	5
(Australia) C Dibley (Australia) W Turnbull	6	6
(Morocco) O Laimina (Belgium) M Van Haver	0	3
(Venezuela) J Andrew (Romania) M Simionescu	w/o
(United Kingdom) H Bond (United Kingdom) G Coles
(Argentina) R Cano (Colombia) I Fernández de Soto	6	7
(France) P Joly (Italy) A-M Nasuelli	4	5
(United States) S Stewart (United States) V Ziegenfuss	5	6	6
(France) P Hagelauer (France) F Thibault	7	2	2

Second round
(Rhodesia) C Dowdeswell (South Africa) L Boshoff	6	6
(France) J-L Haillet (Romania) V Ruzici	4	3
(France) J-B Chanfreau (United States) M Redondo	1	4
(Australia) C Dibley (Australia) W Turnbull	6	6
(France) P Beust (France) G Lovera	6	7
(Venezuela) J Andrew (Romania) M Simionescu	3	5
(Argentina) R Cano (Colombia) I Fernández de Soto	3	2
(United States) S Stewart (United States) V Ziegenfuss	6	6

Quarterfinals
(Rhodesia) C Dowdeswell (South Africa) L Boshoff	3	6	6
(Australia) C Dibley (Australia) W Turnbull	6	3	2
(France) P Beust (France) G Lovera	7	6
(United States) S Stewart (United States) V Ziegenfuss	5	4

Semifinals
(Rhodesia) C Dowdeswell (South Africa) L Boshoff	7	7
(France) P Beust (France) G Lovera	6	5

=== Bottom half ===
First round
(Romania) V Marcu (Netherlands) E Vessies	6	3
(France) J Lovera (Czechoslovakia) R Maršíková	7	6
(Spain) J Castañón (Spain) C Perea
(France) W N'Godrella (France) N Fuchs	w/o
(France) R Brunet (Belgium) M Gurdal	6	1
(Colombia) I Molina (Romania) F Mihai	7	6
(France) D Naegelen (France) B Simon	1	1
(Australia) M Edmondson (Australia) C Doerner	6	6
(Australia) W Lloyd (Australia) C Zeeman	6	6	6
(Romania) I Sânteiu (France) F Guédy	0	7	1

Second round
(France) J Lovera (Czechoslovakia) R Maršíková	1	6
(Australia) K Warwick (South Africa) I Kloss	6	7
(France) W N'Godrella (France) N Fuchs	2	5
(Colombia) J Velasco (Uruguay) F Bonicelli	6	7
(Colombia) I Molina (Romania) F Mihai	6	3	6
(Australia) M Edmondson (Australia) C Doerner	4	6	4
(Australia) W Lloyd (Australia) C Zeeman	3	2
(France) P Dominguez (United Kingdom) S Barker	6	6

Quarterfinals
(Australia) K Warwick (South Africa) I Kloss	6	6
(Colombia) J Velasco (Uruguay) F Bonicelli	3	2
(Colombia) I Molina (Romania) F Mihai	3	2
(France) P Dominguez (United Kingdom) S Barker	6	6

Semifinals
(Australia) K Warwick (South Africa) I Kloss	w/o
(France) P Dominguez (United Kingdom) S Barker
