= Sue Barker =

English tennis player and television presenter

Sue Barker CBE
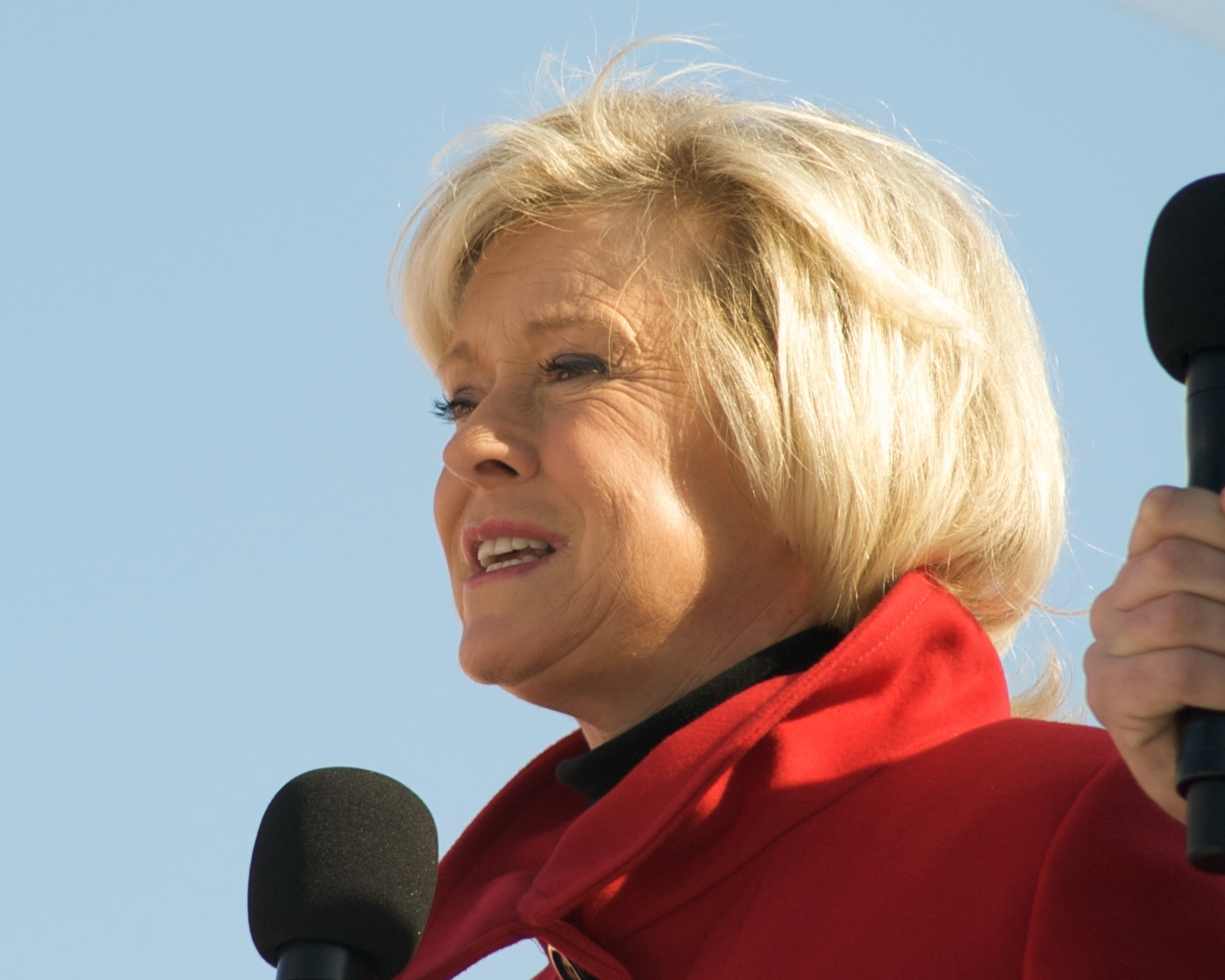
- Barker in 2008
- Country (sports): (United Kingdom) Great Britain
- Residence: Stanton, Gloucestershire, England, UK
- Born: 19 April 1956 (age 70) Paignton, Devon, England, UK
- Height: 5 ft 5 in (1.65 m)
- Turned pro: 1972
- Retired: 1984
- Plays: Right-handed (one-handed backhand)
- Prize money: US$ 878,701

Singles
- Career record: 407–250 (61.9%)
- Career titles: 23 (15 WTA)
- Highest ranking: No. 4 (20 March 1977)

Grand Slam singles results
- Australian Open: SF (1975, 1977^{Dec})
- French Open: W (1976)
- Wimbledon: SF (1977)
- US Open: 4R (1976)

Other tournaments
- Tour Finals: F (1977)

Doubles
- Career record: 33–38
- Career titles: 12
- Last updated on: 15 November 2022.

Susan Alan Barker (born 19 April 1956) is a British former professional tennis player and television presenter. Barker won 15 WTA Tour-level singles titles, including a major at the 1976 French Open. She reached a career-high singles ranking of world no. 3.

Barker started working for the BBC as a tennis presenter in 1993 and, the following year, began to present coverage of the Wimbledon tennis championships; she held this role until 2022. In addition, Barker fronted coverage of other major sporting occasions and sports for the BBC, including Olympic and Commonwealth Games, athletics and horse racing. Barker is also a former presenter of A Question of Sport, Grandstand and BBC Sports Personality of the Year.

== Early life ==
Barker was born on 19 April 1956, grew up in Paignton, Devon, and attended The Marist Convent School, Paignton, a convent school. She is the youngest of three children, with an older brother and sister. In 1966, aged 10, she was picked out as the second of two girls who were to receive tennis coaching from Arthur Roberts, who had coached Angela Mortimer to three Grand Slam titles.

Roberts continued coaching her beyond the selection prize commitment, charging only £1/session to allow her development to continue. Barker's forehand was her strongest and most admired weapon throughout her career, with Roberts describing it as "especially potent".

Advised as a teenager by a visiting LTA coach to change her forehand, Roberts told her not to and he later resigned from the LTA Coaches Association in protest at the advice. Roberts later entered Barker into tournaments on the continent, providing her with a one-way ticket there and telling her to "earn your ticket home". Roberts remained Barker's mentor throughout her career.

== Tennis career ==
Aged 16, and ranked 21st in the WTA rankings, Barker was advised by Roberts to move to the United States for her development. Signed by Mark McCormack's International Management Group (IMG) on her 17th birthday, she moved to an IMG-provided townhouse in Newport Beach, California, where her neighbours included the newly retired Rod Laver, and was coached at the John Wayne Tennis Club.

In 1973 and 1974, Barker won the Exmouth Open at Exmouth, Devon, on both occasions against Annette Coe. In 1975, Barker won her first top-level singles title and three additional titles. Barker reached her first Grand Slam semi-final in 1975 at the Australian Open. She won the German Open in 1976, beating Renáta Tomanová of Czechoslovakia in the final 6–3, 6–1.

Later in 1976, Barker had the biggest victory of her career by winning the French Open at the age of 20, again defeating Tomanová in the final. After her French Open victory against Tomanová, Barker felt that it would be the first of a number of Grand Slam titles that she would win, but she would not reach another Grand Slam final in her career.

In 1977 Barker won two singles titles in San Francisco and Dallas. She beat Martina Navratilova to reach the Virginia Slims Tour Championships final, where she lost in three sets to Chris Evert. Barker reached the Australian Open semi-final for the second time in 1977 and reached the Wimbledon semi-final that year. She looked set to meet Virginia Wade in the Wimbledon final in 1977, but unexpectedly lost her semi-final against Betty Stöve of the Netherlands.

Years later, Barker said that losing to Stöve was the biggest disappointment of her career and admitted that she was so upset at losing in the 1977 Wimbledon semi-final that she could not bear to watch the final, which was won by Wade.

After an injury-plagued 1978 during which her ranking dropped to World No. 24, she won three singles titles and reached three other finals in 1979. She was named the tour's "Comeback Player of the Year" by her fellow professionals. Barker reached one final in 1980 and won the last singles title of her career at the Brighton International in 1981, finishing the year ranked World No. 16. She won her last doubles title in 1982 at Cincinnati and played her last professional match in 1984.

Barker won 15 singles titles and 12 doubles titles, with wins over Chris Evert, Martina Navratilova, Billie Jean King, Evonne Goolagong, Tracy Austin, Virginia Wade, Maria Bueno, Rosemary Casals, Andrea Jaeger and Pam Shriver. In 2004, recalling her French Open win of 1976, Barker said "I'm still incredibly proud of what I achieved."

== Major finals ==
=== Grand Slam finals ===
==== Singles (1 title) ====
Result	Year	Championship	Surface	Opponent	Score
Win	1976	French Open	Clay	(Czechoslovakia) Renáta Tomanová	6–2, 0–6, 6–2

=== Year-end championships finals ===
==== Singles (1 runner–up) ====
Result	Year	Championship	Surface	Opponent	Score
Loss	1977	Virginia Slims Championships	Carpet (i)	(United States) Chris Evert	6–2, 1–6, 1–6

==== Doubles (1 runner–up) ====
Result	Year	Championship	Surface	Partner	Opponents	Score
Loss	1979	Avon Championships	Carpet (i)	(United States) Ann Kiyomura	(France) Françoise Dürr (Netherlands) Betty Stöve	6–7^{(1–7)}, 6–7^{(3–7)}

== WTA Tour finals ==
=== Singles: 31 (15–16) ===
Winner – Legend Grand Slam tournaments (1–0) WTA Tour Championships (0–1) Virginia Slims, Avon, Other (14–15)	Titles by surface Hard (0–1) Grass (6–6) Clay (5–1) Carpet (4–8)

Result	W-L	Date	Tournament	Surface	Opponent	Score
Win	1–0	May 1974	Surbiton, UK	Grass	(United Kingdom) Sue Mappin	6–2, 7–5
Loss	1–1	Jun 1974	Chichester, UK	Grass	(Israel) Paulina Peisachov	2–6, 2–6
Win	2–1	Jul 1974	Båstad, Sweden	Clay	(Netherlands) Marijke Jansen	6–1, 7–5
Win	3–1	Jul 1975	Båstad, Sweden	Clay	(West Germany) Helga Masthoff	6–4, 6–0
Win	4–1	Jul 1975	Kitzbühel, Austria	Clay	(United States) Pam Teeguarden	6–4, 6–4
Loss	4–2	Nov 1975	Paris, France	Carpet (i)	(United Kingdom) Virginia Wade	1–6, 7–6, 7–9
Win	5–2	Dec 1975	Adelaide, Australia	Grass	(West Germany) Helga Masthoff	6–5, ret.
Loss	5–3	Dec 1975	Sydney, Australia	Grass	(Australia) Evonne Goolagong	2–6, 4–6
Win	6–3	Jan 1975	Auckland, New Zealand	Grass	(West Germany) Helga Masthoff	6–2, 6–1
Loss	6–4	May 1976	Bournemouth, UK	Clay	(West Germany) Helga Masthoff	7–5, 3–6, 3–6
Win	7–4	May 1976	Hamburg, West Germany	Clay	(Czechoslovakia) Renáta Tomanová	6–3, 6–1
Win	8–4	May 1976	French Open	Clay	(Czechoslovakia) Renáta Tomanová	6–2, 0–6, 6–2
Loss	8–5	Nov 1976	Tokyo, Japan	Carpet (i)	(United States) Chris Evert	2–6, 6–7
Loss	8–6	Dec 1976	Melbourne, Australia	Grass	(Australia) Margaret Court	2–6, 2–6
Loss	8–7	Jan 1977	Houston, US	Carpet (i)	(Czechoslovakia) Martina Navratilova	6–7^{(3–7)}, 5–7
Loss	8–8	Jan 1977	Minneapolis, US	Carpet (i)	(Czechoslovakia) Martina Navratilova	0–6, 1–6
Loss	8–9	Feb 1977	Detroit, US	Carpet (i)	(Czechoslovakia) Martina Navratilova	4–6, 4–6
Win	9–9	Feb 1977	San Francisco, US	Carpet (i)	(United Kingdom) Virginia Wade	6–3, 6–4
Win	10–9	Mar 1977	Dallas, US	Carpet (i)	(United States) Terry Holladay	6–1, 7–6^{(7–4)}
Loss	10–10	Mar 1977	VS Championships, US	Carpet (i)	(United States) Chris Evert	6–2, 1–6, 1–6
Loss	10–11	Dec 1977	Sydney, Australia	Grass	(Australia) Evonne Goolagong	2–6, 3–6
Win	11–11	Nov 1978	Brisbane, Australia	Grass	(Australia) Chris O'Neil	6–1, 6–3
Loss	11–12	Mar 1979	Boston, US	Carpet (i)	(Australia) Dianne Fromholtz	2–6, 6–7^{(4–7)}
Loss	11–13	Mar 1979	Carlsbad , US	Hard	(Australia) Kerry Reid	6–7, 6–3, 2–6
Win	12–13	Jun 1979	Manchester, UK	Grass	(United Kingdom) Anne Hobbs	7–5, 4–6, 6–0
Loss	12–14	Jun 1979	Chichester, UK	Grass	(Australia) Evonne Goolagong Cawley	1–6, 4–6
Win	13–14	Sep 1979	Pittsburgh, US	Carpet (i)	(United States) Renée Richards	6–3, 6–1
Win	14–14	Dec 1979	Sydney, Australia	Grass	(South Africa) Rosalyn Fairbank	6–0, 7–5
Loss	14–15	Dec 1980	Adelaide, Australia	Grass	(Czechoslovakia) Hana Mandlíková	1–6, 4–6
Loss	14–16	Aug 1981	Richmond, US	Carpet (i)	(United States) Mary-Lou Piatek	4–6, 1–6
Win	15–16	Oct 1981	Brighton, UK	Carpet (i)	(Socialist Federal Republic of Yugoslavia) Mima Jaušovec	4–6, 6–1, 6–1

=== Doubles: 30 (12–18) ===
Winner – Legend Grand Slam tournaments (0–0) WTA Tour Championships (0–1) Virginia Slims, Avon, Other (12–17)	Titles by surface Hard (0–0) Grass (2–4) Clay (2–4) Carpet (8–10)

Result	W-L	Date	Tournament	Surface	Partner	Opponents	Score
Loss	0–1	May 1975	Rome	Clay	(United Kingdom) Glynis Coles	(United States) Chris Evert (Czechoslovakia) Martina Navratilova	1–6, 2–6
Win	1–1	Jul 1975	Kitzbühel	Clay	(United States) Pam Teeguarden	(Uruguay) Fiorella Bonicelli (Argentina) Raquel Giscafré	6–1, 6–3
Win	2–1	Dec 1975	Adelaide	Grass	(United Kingdom) Michelle Tyler	(Australia) Kym Ruddell (Australia) Janet Young	7–5, 6–3
Loss	2–2	Dec 1975	Perth	Grass	(United Kingdom) Michelle Tyler	(Australia) Christine Matison (Australia) Lesley Bowrey	6–7, 3–6
Loss	2–3	Aug 1976	Toronto	Clay	(United States) Pam Teeguarden	(Australia) Cynthia Doerner (United States) Janet Newberry	7–6, 3–6, 1–6
Win	3–3	Oct 1976	Hilton Head Island	Clay	(Australia) Evonne Goolagong	(Czechoslovakia) Martina Navratilova (United Kingdom) Virginia Wade	4–6, 6–4, 3–6
Win	4–3	Nov 1976	Tokyo	Carpet (i)	(United States) Ann Kiyomura	(United States) Rosie Casals (France) Françoise Dürr	4–6, 6–3, 6–1
Loss	4–4	Jan 1977	Houston	Carpet (i)	(United States) Ann Kiyomura	(Czechoslovakia) Martina Navratilova (Netherlands) Betty Stöve	6–4, 2–6, 1–6
Loss	4–5	Feb 1977	San Francisco	Carpet (i)	(United States) Ann Kiyomura	(Australia) Kerry Reid (South Africa) Greer Stevens	3–6, 1–6
Loss	4–6	Feb 1979	Seattle	Carpet (i)	(United States) Ann Kiyomura	(France) Françoise Dürr (Netherlands) Betty Stöve	6–7^{(4–7)}, 6–4, 4–6
Loss	4–7	Feb 1979	Detroit	Carpet (i)	(United States) Ann Kiyomura	(Netherlands) Betty Stöve (Australia) Wendy Turnbull	4–6, 6–7^{(5–7)}
Loss	4–8	Mar 1979	Boston	Carpet (i)	(United States) Ann Kiyomura	(Australia) Kerry Reid (Australia) Wendy Turnbull	4–6, 2–6
Loss	4–9	Mar 1979	Avon Championships	Carpet (i)	(United States) Ann Kiyomura	(France) Françoise Dürr (Netherlands) Betty Stöve	6–7, 6–7
Loss	4–10	Apr 1979	Tokyo	Carpet (i)	(United States) Ann Kiyomura	(France) Françoise Dürr (Netherlands) Betty Stöve	5–7, 6–7
Win	5–10	Sep 1979	Pittsburgh	Carpet (i)	(United States) Candy Reynolds	(United States) Bunny Bruning (United States) Jane Stratton	6–3, 6–2
Loss	5–11	Dec 1979	Sydney	Grass	(United States) Pam Shriver	(United States) Billie Jean King (Australia) Wendy Turnbull	5–7, 4–6
Loss	5–12	Dec 1979	Adelaide	Grass	(United States) Pam Shriver	(Czechoslovakia) Hana Mandlíková (Romania) Virginia Ruzici	1–6, 6–3, 2–6
Win	6–12	Feb 1980	Oakland	Carpet (i)	(United States) Ann Kiyomura	(South Africa) Greer Stevens (United Kingdom) Virginia Wade	6–0, 6–4
Loss	6–13	Mar 1980	Tokyo	Carpet (i)	(United States) Ann Kiyomura	(United States) Billie Jean King (Czechoslovakia) Martina Navratilova	5–7, 3–6
Loss	6–14	Dec 1980	Adelaide	Grass	(United States) Sharon Walsh	(United States) Pam Shriver (Netherlands) Betty Stöve	4–6, 3–6
Win	7–14	Feb 1981	Houston	Carpet (i)	(United States) Ann Kiyomura	(Czechoslovakia) Regina Maršíková (United States) Mary-Lou Piatek	5–7, 6–3, 6–4
Loss	7–15	Feb 1981	Seattle	Carpet (i)	(United States) Ann Kiyomura	(United States) Rosie Casals (Australia) Wendy Turnbull	4–6, 1–6
Win	8–15	Mar 1981	Los Angeles	Carpet (i)	(United States) Ann Kiyomura	(United States) Peanut Louie (United States) Marita Redondo	6–1, 4–6, 6–1
Win	9–15	May 1981	Tokyo	Carpet (i)	(United States) Ann Kiyomura	(United States) Barbara Potter (United States) Sharon Walsh	7–5, 6–2
Loss	9–16	May 1981	Berlin	Clay	(Czechoslovakia) Renáta Tomanová	(United States) Rosalyn Fairbank (South Africa) Tanya Harford	3–6, 4–6
Win	10–16	Jun 1981	Surbiton	Grass	(United States) Ann Kiyomura	(United States) Billie Jean King (South Africa) Ilana Kloss	6–1, 6–7, 6–1
Loss	10–17	Aug 1981	Indianapolis	Clay	(United States) Paula Smith	(United States) JoAnne Russell (Romania) Virginia Ruzici	2–6, 2–6
Win	11–17	Aug 1981	Richmond	Carpet (i)	(United States) Ann Kiyomura	(United States) Kathy Jordan (United States) Anne Smith	4–6, 7–6, 6–4
Win	12–17	Jan 1982	Cincinnati	Carpet (i)	(United States) Ann Kiyomura	(United States) Pam Shriver (United States) Anne Smith	6–2, 7–6
Loss	12–18	Feb 1982	Houston	Carpet (i)	(United States) Sharon Walsh	(United States) Kathy Jordan (United States) Pam Shriver	6–7^{(6–8)}, 2–6

== Performance timelines ==
Key
W	F	SF	QF	#R	RR	Q#	DNQ	A	NH

(W) winner; (F) finalist; (SF) semifinalist; (QF) quarterfinalist; (#R) rounds 4, 3, 2, 1; (RR) round-robin stage; (Q#) qualification round; (DNQ) did not qualify; (A) absent; (NH) not held; (SR) strike rate (events won / competed); (W–L) win–loss record.
- " * " – Barker received a bye in the first round.
- " ^ " – Barker withdrew prior to the match, which is not counted as a loss.

=== Singles ===
Tournament	1973	1974	1975	1976	1977		1978	1979	1980	1981	1982	1983	1984	W–L	SR
Grand Slam tournaments
Australian Open	A	3R	SF	2R	(Jan); A	(Dec); SF	QF	A	3R	3R	1R	A	Q1	16–8	0 / 8
French Open	A	A	3R	W	A		A	2R	A	1R	A	A	1R	9–4	1 / 5
Wimbledon	2R	1R	3R*	QF	SF*		4R	1R	2R*	3R	1R	1R	2R	16–12	0 / 12
US Open	A	A	2R	4R*	3R		A	2R*	A	2R	A	A	1R	6–6	0 / 6
Year-end championship
WTA Championships	Did not qualify			F	F		DNQ	SF	Did not qualify					9–5	0 / 4
Win–loss	1–1	2–2	8–4	16–5	12–4		5–2	4–5	2–2	5–4	0–2	0–1	1–3	56–35	1 / 35
Year-end ranking	N/A		19	10	5		24	10	16	14	62	57	155		

=== Doubles ===
Tournament	1974	1975	1976	1977		1978	1979	1980	1981	1982	1983	1984	W–L	SR
Australian Open	QF	QF*	QF*	(Jan); A	(Dec); 1R	1R	A	SF	SF	1R	A	1R	10–9	0 / 9
French Open	A	QF*	2R*	A		A	A	A	A	A	A	2R	2–3	0 / 3
Wimbledon	2R*	QF*	1R	3R*		SF*	QF	QF	SF	2R*	1R	A	16–10	0 / 10
US Open	A	QF^	QF	A		A	1R	A	A	A	A	1R	5–3	0 / 4
Year-end championship
WTA Championships	Did not qualify						F (W:1; L:1)	DNQ	SF (W:0; L:1)	Did not qualify			1–2	0 / 2
Win–loss	2–2	6–3	4–4	1–2		3–2	4–3	6–2	7–3	0–2	0–1	1–3	33–25	0 / 26
Year-end ranking	N/A											116		

=== Mixed doubles ===
Tournament	1974	1975	1976	1977	1978	1979	1980	1981	1982	1983	1984	W–L	SR
Australian Open	Absent											0–0	0 / 0
French Open	Absent		SF*^	Absent								2–0	0 / 1
Wimbledon	Absent				1R	Absent				3R	2R	3–3	0 / 3
US Open	Absent											0–0	0 / 0
Win–loss	2–0	0–0	0–0	0–0	0–1	0–0	0–0	0–0	0–0	2–1	1–1	5–3	0 / 4

=== Fed Cup ===
1974 Federation Cup
Date	Venue	Surface	Round	Opponents	Final match score	Match	Opponent	Rubber score
13–19 May 1974	Naples	Clay	SF	Australia	0–3	Doubles (with Virginia Wade)	Goolagong/Young	0–6, 2–6 (L)
1975 Federation Cup
5–11 May 1975	Aix-en-Provence	Clay	1R	Austria	3–0	Singles	Sabine Bernegger	6–3, 6–2 (W)
5–11 May 1975	Aix-en-Provence	Clay	1R	Austria	3–0	Doubles (with Glynis Coles)	Bernegger/Buche	6–3, 6–1 (W)
5–11 May 1975	Aix-en-Provence	Clay	QF	France	1–2	Singles	Nathalie Fuchs	1–6, 6–1, 4–6 (L)
1976 Federation Cup
22–29 Aug 1976	Philadelphia, PA	Carpet (I)	1R	France	3–0	Singles	Nathalie Fuchs	6–3, 6–0 (W)
22–29 Aug 1976	Philadelphia, PA	Carpet (I)	1R	France	3–0	Doubles (with Virginia Wade)	Benedetti/Darmon	6–3, 6–2 (W)
22–29 Aug 1976	Philadelphia, PA	Carpet (I)	QF	South Africa	2–1	Singles	Linky Boshoff	6–1, 6–1 (W)
22–29 Aug 1976	Philadelphia, PA	Carpet (I)	QF	South Africa	2–1	Doubles (with Michelle Tyler)	Boshoff/Kloss	1–6, 4–6 (L)
22–29 Aug 1976	Philadelphia, PA	Carpet (I)	SF	Australia	0–3	Singles	Dianne Fromholtz	2–6, 6–7 (L)
22–29 Aug 1976	Philadelphia, PA	Carpet (I)	SF	Australia	0–3	Doubles (with Virginia Wade)	Cawley/Reid	1–6, 3–6 (L)
1977 Federation Cup
13–18 Jun 1977	Eastbourne	Grass	1R	Denmark	3–0	Singles	Dorte Ekner	6–3, 6–1 (W)
13–18 Jun 1977	Eastbourne	Grass	1R	Denmark	3–0	Doubles (with Virginia Wade)	Ekner/Sparre	6–2, 6–2 (W)
13–18 Jun 1977	Eastbourne	Grass	2R	South Korea	3–0	Singles	Choi Kyeong-Mi	6–1, 6–3 (W)
13–18 Jun 1977	Eastbourne	Grass	2R	South Korea	3–0	Doubles (with Virginia Wade)	Choi/Lee	6–1, 6–0 (W)
13–18 Jun 1977	Eastbourne	Grass	QF	Sweden	3–0	Singles	Mimmi Wikstedt	6–2, 6–0 (W)
13–18 Jun 1977	Eastbourne	Grass	QF	Sweden	3–0	Doubles (with Virginia Wade)	Anliot/Wikstedt	6–2, 5–7, 6–3 (W)
13–18 Jun 1977	Eastbourne	Grass	SF	Australia	1–2	Singles	Dianne Fromholtz	3–6, 4–6 (L)
13–18 Jun 1977	Eastbourne	Grass	SF	Australia	1–2	Doubles (with Virginia Wade)	Reid/Turnbull	6–1, 6–4 (W)
1978 Federation Cup
27 Nov – 3 Dec 1978	Melbourne	Grass	1R	Spain	3–0	Singles	Mónica Álvarez de Mon	6–0, 10–8 (W)
27 Nov – 3 Dec 1978	Melbourne	Grass	2R	West Germany	2–1	Singles	Sylvia Hanika	3–6, 2–6 (L)
27 Nov – 3 Dec 1978	Melbourne	Grass	2R	West Germany	2–1	Doubles (with Virginia Wade)	Ebbinghaus/Hanika	6–3, 6–0 (W)
27 Nov – 3 Dec 1978	Melbourne	Grass	QF	Czechoslovakia	2–1	Doubles (with Virginia Wade)	Mandlíková/Tomanová	8–6, 7–5 (W)
27 Nov – 3 Dec 1978	Melbourne	Grass	SF	United States	0–3	Doubles (with Anne Hobbs)	Casals/King	6–1, 3–6, 4–6 (L)
1979 Federation Cup
30 Apr – 6 May 1979	Madrid	Clay	1R	New Zealand	3–0	Singles	Chris Newton	6–0, 6–0 (W)
30 Apr – 6 May 1979	Madrid	Clay	1R	New Zealand	3–0	Doubles (with Virginia Wade)	Newton/Perry	6–1, 6–1 (W)
30 Apr – 6 May 1979	Madrid	Clay	2R	Belgium	3–0	Singles	Monique Van Haver	6–3, 11–9 (W)
30 Apr – 6 May 1979	Madrid	Clay	2R	Belgium	3–0	Doubles (with Virginia Wade)	Gurdal/Van Haver	6–3, 6–0 (W)
30 Apr – 6 May 1979	Madrid	Clay	QF	Czechoslovakia	0–3	Singles	Hana Mandlíková	6–3, 6–8, 4–6 (L)
1980 Federation Cup
19–25 May 1980	Berlin	Clay	1R	Israel	3–0	Singles	Paulina Peled	4–6, 7–6, 6–1 (W)
19–25 May 1980	Berlin	Clay	1R	Israel	3–0	Doubles (with Glynis Coles)	Bialistozky/Peled	6–2, 6–3 (W)
19–25 May 1980	Berlin	Clay	2R	Argentina	2–1	Singles	Adriana Villagrán-Reami	5–7, 7–6, 6–2 (W)
19–25 May 1980	Berlin	Clay	2R	Argentina	2–1	Doubles (with Virginia Wade)	Madruga Osses/Villagrán-Reami	5–7, 6–2, 6–4 (W)
19–25 May 1980	Berlin	Clay	QF	West Germany	0–3	Singles	Bettina Bunge	2–6, 0–6 (L)
19–25 May 1980	Berlin	Clay	QF	West Germany	0–3	Doubles (with Virginia Wade)	Bunge/Hanika	3–6, 3–6 (L)
1981 Federation Cup
9–15 Nov 1981	Tokyo	Clay	1R	Belgium	3–0	Doubles (with Jo Durie)	de Witte/de Wouters	6–3, 6–3 (W)
9–15 Nov 1981	Tokyo	Clay	2R	France	3–0	Singles	Corinne Vanier	4–6, 6–2, 10–8 (W)
9–15 Nov 1981	Tokyo	Clay	2R	France	3–0	Doubles (with Virginia Wade)	Amiach/Tanvier	5–7, 6–1, 6–2 (W)
9–15 Nov 1981	Tokyo	Clay	QF	Soviet Union	2–1	Singles	Elena Eliseenko	4–6, 6–4, 6–4 (W)
9–15 Nov 1981	Tokyo	Clay	QF	Soviet Union	2–1	Doubles (with Virginia Wade)	Cherneva/Zaitseva	6–3, 6–1 (W)
9–15 Nov 1981	Tokyo	Clay	SF	Australia	2–1	Singles	Wendy Turnbull	7–6, 3–6, 6–2 (W)
9–15 Nov 1981	Tokyo	Clay	SF	Australia	2–1	Doubles (with Virginia Wade)	Leo/Turnbull	7–6, 6–3 (W)
9–15 Nov 1981	Tokyo	Clay	F	United States	0–3	Singles	Chris Evert	2–6, 1–6 (L)
1982 Federation Cup
19–25 Jul 1982	Santa Clara	Hard	1R	BYE				
19–25 Jul 1982	Santa Clara	Hard	2R	Israel	3–0	Singles	Orly Bialistozky	6–1, 6–3 (W)
19–25 Jul 1982	Santa Clara	Hard	QF	Soviet Union	1–2	Singles	Hana Mandlíková	7–6, 6–7, 3–6 (L)

== Broadcasting career ==
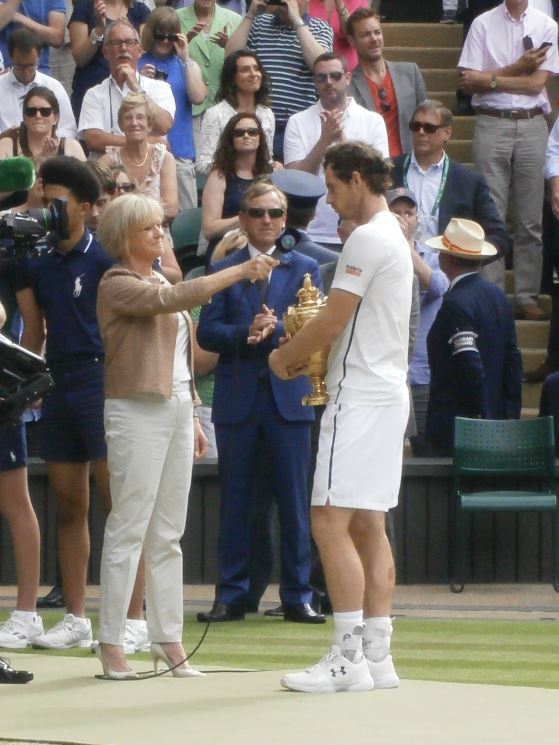
Sue Barker interviewing Andy Murray at Wimbledon in 2016

After retiring as a tennis player, Barker became a commentator and sports reporter for Australia's Channel 7 in 1985 before anchoring tennis coverage for British Sky Broadcasting from 1990 to 1993. In 1993, Barker joined the BBC and hosted its Wimbledon coverage as a regular guest on Today at Wimbledon with Harry Carpenter. She took over as host of Today at Wimbledon in 1994, and from 2000 until 2022, she anchored the two-week-long broadcast for the network.

Barker has branched out since joining the BBC, becoming one of their chief sports presenters. She was one of the presenters of Grandstand and the presenter of the long-running sports quiz show A Question of Sport (QoS) since 1997, having succeeded David Coleman. She retired as QoS presenter following the BBC's decision to revamp the show, having recorded her last episode in September 2020. She was a host of the annual BBC Sports Personality of the Year awards ceremony from 1994 to 2012 before stepping down in 2013.

Barker has hosted BBC Sport's coverage of the Australian Open, the French Open, Queens Club Championships, Eastbourne, the Davis Cup, the ATP World Tour Finals and Wimbledon.

Other sporting events she has hosted have included the Grand National (2000–2007), the Derby (2001–2007), Racing at Ascot and Longchamp (1995–1999), Hennessy Gold Cup at Newbury, the Great North Run, World Athletics Championships and European Athletics Championships (1999–2009), BBC Sports Personality of the Year (1994–2012), Commonwealth Games (1994–2010), Summer Olympics (1996–2012) and Winter Olympics (1994–2010).

For the Sydney 2000 Olympics, Barker led the BBC's coverage of the games alongside Steve Rider. At the Athens 2004 Olympics, Barker again headed the BBC's coverage alongside Rider. At the Beijing 2008 Games, Barker fronted the day's evening action, as well as coverage of the opening and closing ceremonies. At the London 2012 Games, Barker presented coverage of events through the afternoon. This was Barker's final time presenting the Summer Olympics.

For the Salt Lake City 2002 Winter Olympics, Barker was one of the BBC's lead presenters. This was a role she took up again for the Turin 2006 Games. For the Vancouver 2010 Olympics, Barker once again lead the BBC's coverage, as well as commentating on the figure skating alongside Robin Cousins. Barker did not present coverage at the Sochi 2014 Games but did commentate on the figure skating events once again.

At the Manchester 2002 Commonwealth Games, Baker headed the BBC's coverage alongside Rider. At the Melbourne 2006 Games, Barker lead coverage again, alongside Hazel Irvine and Clare Balding. Barker again presented for the BBC at the Delhi 2010 Games, which would be her final Commonwealth Games.

Barker provided commentary for the 1998 video game Actua Tennis, along with fellow BBC broadcaster Barry Davies.

In June 1999, she co-presented coverage of Prince Edward's wedding to Sophie Rhys-Jones at Windsor alongside Michael Buerk. Barker had introduced Rhys-Jones to Queen Elizabeth II's youngest son at a charity function a few years earlier.

In 2008, Barker and the BBC extended her contract to cover the London 2012 Summer Olympics. It was estimated to be worth £375,000 a year.

In July 2012, the Advertising Standards Authority in the UK received over 40 complaints for a Go Compare advert featuring Barker who was shown firing a large rocket launcher at opera singer Gio Compario (Wynne Evans) in an attempt to kill off the face of the brand. A spokesperson for the ASA said: "Some people think it offensive especially at a time when children are watching. Others think it inappropriate when our security forces are coming under fire on a daily basis. As with all complaints, we are looking into the matter before deciding if we launch a full investigation."

Barker was appointed Member of the Order of the British Empire (MBE) in the 2000 New Year Honours for services to sport and broadcasting, Officer of the Order of the British Empire (OBE) in the 2016 New Year Honours for services to broadcasting and charity and Commander of the Order of the British Empire (CBE) in the 2021 Birthday Honours for services to broadcasting and charity.

In September 2020, it was announced that Barker would step down from her role as host of BBC game show A Question of Sport after 24 years; she stated that she was "sad to say goodbye". Barker has since stated that she was dismissed from the show rather than leaving by choice. She alleges that she was asked to put her name to an untrue pre-prepared statement claiming she left of her own accord when this was not the case. Barker accepted the BBC's decision to replace her, which she claimed was because they wished to "refresh" the show. However, she criticised the BBC's handling of the matter, describing this as "insulting" and saying that she felt "slightly damaged" by the experience.

On 9 June 2022, Barker announced she would be stepping down from BBC coverage of the Wimbledon tennis championship after the 2022 finals, which she had covered since 1993.

== Personal life ==
At 17 years of age, Barker moved to California. In 1978, she broke off an engagement with Australian tennis player Syd Ball. In an interview the following year, she said: "I realised that Syd wasn't the answer. Underneath, I wasn't happy and I certainly wasn't ready for marriage. I wasn't fair to him or myself." After her engagement was broken off, she had a brief relationship with golfer Greg Norman.

In 1980, Barker was temporarily blinded in her right eye after a large dog in Spain jumped up and bit her. She lost the sight in her eye for five hours and feared that the dog attack would force her to stop playing tennis, which she said "broke her heart".

In 1982, Barker met singer Cliff Richard. Their four-month-long romance attracted considerable media attention after Richard flew to Denmark to watch her play in a tennis match and they were photographed cuddling and holding hands at Wimbledon. In 1988, Richard said of his former romance with Barker: "We were closer than just friends. She's the only person with whom I've had that sort of relationship." He said that one of the things which made up his mind not to marry her was when she got upset because he hadn't told her who he was seeing that day: "I suddenly realised that in a marriage you don't live for yourself." And in 2008, that he had come close to asking her to marry him: "I seriously contemplated asking her to marry me, but in the end I realised that I didn't love her quite enough to commit the rest of my life to her."

In 1986 some time after Barker's romance with Richard had ended and she began a brief relationship with tennis player Stephen Shaw, Richard said that he was still a friend of Barker: "We have a mutual respect for each other and that means a lot to me."

In 1988, Barker married landscape gardener and former policeman Lance Tankard. They live in the Cotswolds village of Stanton, Gloucestershire, after moving from a mansion on a 26-acre estate in Chiddingfold, Surrey.

In an interview in 1999, Barker said that during her tennis career she was approached by a lesbian tennis player in the locker room and touched "in a way that didn't feel right". Barker refused to name the female tennis player involved.

In September 2022, Barker featured on Desert Island Discs; Her favourite chosen track was "Harry Hippie" by Bobby Womack, with her choice of book and luxury item given as All In by Billie Jean King and some New Zealand sauvignon blanc wine respectively.

Barker's autobiography Calling the Shots was published in September 2022.

== See also ==
- Table of all female tennis players since 1978 who reached at least one Grand Slam final

Media offices
Preceded by David Coleman	Regular host of Question of Sport; 1997–2021	Succeeded by Paddy McGuinness
Awards and achievements
Preceded by Mark Nicholas	RTS Television Sport Awards; Best Sports Presenter; 2001	Succeeded by Gary Lineker
