= 1976 French Open – Women's singles =

Women's singles
- 1976 French Open

Final
- Champion: (United Kingdom) Sue Barker
- Runner-up: (Czechoslovakia) Renáta Tomanová
- Score: 6–2, 0–6, 6–2

Details
- Draw: 64
- Seeds: 8

Events
Singles	men	women		boys	girls
Doubles	men	women	mixed	boys	girls
WC Singles	men	women	quad
WC Doubles	men	women	quad
Legends	−45	45+	women
← 1975 ·	French Open	· 1977 →

Sue Barker defeated Renáta Tomanová in the final, 6–2, 0–6, 6–2 to win the women's singles tennis title at the 1976 French Open. It was her first and only major title.

Chris Evert was the two-time reigning champion, but chose not to defend her title. She elected to compete in World TeamTennis and did not return to the French Open until 1979.

== Seeds ==
The seeded players are listed below. Sue Barker is the champion; others show the round in which they were eliminated.

1. (United Kingdom) Sue Barker (champion)
2. (West Germany) Helga Masthoff (quarterfinals)
3. (United States) Marita Redondo (third round)
4. (Socialist Federal Republic of Yugoslavia) Mima Jaušovec (second round)
5. (Australia) Lesley Hunt (first round)
6. (South Africa) Linky Boshoff (second round)
7. (France) Gail Chanfreau Lovera (second round)
8. (Uruguay) Fiorella Bonicelli (second round)

== Draw ==
=== Key ===
- Q = Qualifier
- WC = Wild card
- LL = Lucky loser
- r = Retired

=== Finals ===
Quarterfinals
2	(West Germany) Helga Masthoff	2	4
(Czechoslovakia) Renáta Tomanová	6	6
(United States) Kathy Kuykendall	2	6	1
(Romania) Florența Mihai	6	0	6
(Czechoslovakia) Miloslava Holubová	1	3
(Romania) Virginia Ruzici	6	6
(Czechoslovakia) Regina Maršíková	6	2	6
1	(United Kingdom) Sue Barker	4	6	8

Semifinals
(Czechoslovakia) Renáta Tomanová	7	7
(Romania) Florența Mihai	5	6
(Romania) Virginia Ruzici	3	6	2
1	(United Kingdom) Sue Barker	6	1	6

Finals
(Czechoslovakia) Renáta Tomanová	2	6	2
1	(United Kingdom) Sue Barker	6	0	6

=== Earlier rounds ===
==== Section 1 ====
First round
2	(West Germany) Masthoff	6	6
(Hungary) Klein	4	3
(Italy) Marzano	6	6
(Argentina) SM Villaverde	4	3
(Australia) Doerner	6	6
(France) de Roubin	2	1
(United States) Du Pont	6	6
(Belgium) Van Haver	3	4
6	(South Africa) Boshoff	6	6
(Sweden) Anliot	4	3
(United States) May	6	0	6
(South Africa) McMillan	3	6	4
(United States) Nagelsen	1	2
(Czechoslovakia) Tomanová	6	6
(South Africa) Kloss	6	6
(West Germany) Eisterlehner	3	0

Second round
2	(West Germany) Masthoff	7	5	6
(Italy) Marzano	5	7	2
(Australia) Doerner	2	6	6
(United States) Du Pont	6	3	2
6	(South Africa) Boshoff	3	7	0
(United States) May	6	5	6
(Czechoslovakia) Tomanová	7	6
(South Africa) Kloss	5	1

Third round
2	(West Germany) Masthoff	1	6	7
(Australia) Doerner	6	0	5
(United States) May	2	2
(Czechoslovakia) Tomanová	6	6

Quarterfinals
2	(West Germany) Masthoff	2	4
(Czechoslovakia) Tomanová	6	6

==== Section 2 ====
First round
4	(Socialist Federal Republic of Yugoslavia) Jaušovec	6	6
(United States) Metcalf	1	1
(United States) Kuykendall	6	6
(Australia) O'Neil	4	0
(Colombia) Fernández-De Soto	6	6
(United States) Stratton	3	1
(West Germany) Riedel	3	6	5
(France) Simon	6	4	7
5	(Australia) Hunt	6	5	6
(France) Thibault	3	7	8
(Australia) Dimond	1	1
(France) Fuchs	6	6
(United States) Ziegenfuss	6	4	3
(Australia) Walker	4	6	6
(South Africa) Whitehouse	6	2	3
(Romania) Mihai	2	6	6

Second round
4	(Socialist Federal Republic of Yugoslavia) Jaušovec	6	6	3
(United States) Kuykendall	3	7	6
(Colombia) Fernández-De Soto	6	6
(France) Simon	0	3
(France) Thibault	5	1
(France) Fuchs	7	6
(Australia) Walker	6	6	3
(Romania) Mihai	7	2	6

Third round
(United States) Kuykendall	6	6
(Colombia) Fernández-De Soto	4	4
(France) Fuchs	7	1	2
(Romania) Mihai	6	6	6

Quarterfinals
(United States) Kuykendall	6	0	6
(Romania) Mihai	2	6	1

==== Section 3 ====
First round
(Australia) Turnbull	6	7
(Sweden) Bentzer	2	6
(Netherlands) Vessies	6	6	11
(United States) Harter	1	7	9
(Brazil) Bueno	4	1
(Czechoslovakia) Holubová	6	6
(South Africa) Vermaak	2	1
7	(France) Lovera	6	6
(United States) Greer	7	6	1
(Hungary) Szabó	6	7	6
(Romania) Ruzici	6	6
(Belgium) Gurdal	2	2
(United States) Norton	6	6
(Australia) Matison	0	1
(Argentina) Weisenberger	1	1
3	(United States) Redondo	6	6

Second round
(Australia) Turnbull	6	6
(Netherlands) Vessies	2	3
(Czechoslovakia) Holubová	1	6	7
7	(France) Lovera	6	2	5
(Hungary) Szabó	2	3
(Romania) Ruzici	6	6
(United States) Norton	7	4	2
3	(United States) Redondo	5	6	6

Third round
(Australia) Turnbull	6	7	0
(Czechoslovakia) Holubová	7	6	6
(Romania) Ruzici	6	6
3	(United States) Redondo	3	2

Quarterfinals
(Czechoslovakia) Holubová	1	3
(Romania) Ruzici	6	6

==== Section 4 ====
First round
(France) Guédy	2	6	6
(France) Rual	6	4	0
(Italy) Rosa	7	6
(United States) Mehmedbasich	5	3
(United Kingdom) Tyler	4	4
(Czechoslovakia) Maršíková	6	6
(Italy) Nasuelli	5	2
8	(Uruguay) Bonicelli	7	6
(South Africa) Cuypers	0	0
(United Kingdom) Coles	6	6
(Spain) Baldovinos	5	1
(Romania) Simionescu	7	6
(United States) Martinez	3	0
(Spain) Perea	6	6
(Australia) Gregory	3	3
1	(United Kingdom) Barker	6	6

Second round
(France) Guédy	2	4
(Italy) Rosa	6	6
(Czechoslovakia) Maršíková	6	2	6
8	(Uruguay) Bonicelli	3	6	4
(United Kingdom) Coles	6	3	5
(Romania) Simionescu	3	6	7
(Spain) Perea	5	6
1	(United Kingdom) Barker	7	7

Third round
(Italy) Rosa	4	1
(Czechoslovakia) Maršíková	6	6
(Romania) Simionescu	5	6	1
1	(United Kingdom) Barker	7	2	6

Quarterfinals
(Czechoslovakia) Maršíková	6	2	6
1	(United Kingdom) Barker	4	6	8

Preceded by 1976 Australian Open – Women's singles	Grand Slam women's singles	Succeeded by 1976 Wimbledon Championships – Women's singles
