= Susana Maria Villaverde =

Swiss tennis player

- Country (sports): Argentina; Switzerland
- Born: 9 February 1955 (age 71)

Grand Slam singles results
- French Open: 1R (1976)

Grand Slam doubles results
- French Open: 2R (1976)

Grand Slam mixed doubles results
- French Open: 1R (1975, 1977)

Susana Maria Villaverde (born 9 February 1955) was a former Swiss tennis player born in Argentina.

She played in singles at the French Open in 1976. Lost to the Italian Daniela Marzano in the first round. Her partner in women's doubles, Argentina Elvira Weisenberger lost in the Second round to Uruguayan Fiorella Bonicelli and French Gail Chanfreau.

== Career finals ==
=== Singles (2–0) ===
Result	No.	Date	location	Surface	Opponent	Score
Win	1.	Jun 1975	Liverpool, United Kingdom	Grass	(Argentina) Inés Roget	6–3, 6–1
Win	1.	Apr 1977	Murcia, Spain	Clay	(Argentina) Marta Catilda	7–5, 6–1

=== Doubles (2–5) ===
Result	No.	Date	location	Surface	Partner	Opponents	Score
Loss	1.	Oct 1972	Quito, Ecuador	Clay	(Argentina) Raquel Giscafré	(Uruguay) Fiorella Bonicelli (Colombia) Isabel Fernández de Soto	1–6, 2–6
Loss	2.	Oct 1975	Madrid, Spain	Clay	(Argentina) Beatriz Villaverde	(West Germany) Heidi Eisterlehner (West Germany) Iris Riedel-Kühn	4–6, 4–6
Loss	3.	Sep 1979	Madrid, Spain	Clay	(Argentina) Beatriz Villaverde	(United Kingdom) Kate Brasher (Sweden) Lena Sandin	1–6, 3–6
Win	1.	Sep 1979	Naples, Italy	Clay	(Argentina) Beatriz Villaverde	(Italy) Monica Giorgi (Italy) Graziela Perna	6–4, 3–6, 6–4
Win	2.	Jul 1980	Geneva, Switzerland	Clay	(Argentina) Liliana Giussani	(Switzerland) Annemarie Rüegg (Netherlands) Marianne van der Torre	6–4, 4–6, 6–0
Loss	4.	May 1981	Bari, Italy	Clay	(Switzerland) Karin Stampfli	(Austria) Andrea Pesak (West Germany) Gabriela Dinu	1–6, 2–6
Loss	5.	Jul 1986	Neumünster, West Germany	Clay	(Switzerland) Céline Cohen	(Czechoslovakia) Denisa Krajčovičová (Czechoslovakia) Alice Noháčová	6–7, 3–6
