= Thunderbird Classic (tennis) =

Defunct tennis tournament
- Event name: Virginia Slims Thunderbird Classic (1971–72); Virginia Slims of Phoenix (1973–74); Thunderbird Classic (1975–80)
- Tour: Virginia Slims Circuit(1972–80)
- Founded: 1952
- Abolished: 1980
- Location: Phoenix, United States
- Venue: Phoenix Country Club
- Surface: Hard / indoor (1952–65); Hard / outdoor (1966–70)

The Thunderbird Classic was a Virginia Slims Circuit affiliated tennis tournament founded in 1952, as a combined men's and women's tournament called the Phoenix Thunderbird Championships Invitational. Also known as the Phoenix Thunderbird Invitation it continued as a joint event until 1970 when it was branded as the Phoenix Thunderbird Open the men's event was discontinued that year.

In 1971, the women's tournament was re branded as the Virginia Slims Thunderbird Classic and ran annually under a number of name changes until 1980 when it too was discontinued.

== History ==
The tournament was founded in 1952, as the Phoenix Thunderbird Championships a joint men's and women's tennis tournament played at the Phoenix Country Club, Phoenix, Arizona, United States. In 1953 the word 'championships' was dropped from the tournament title. In 1969 the tournament went open under the brand name the Thunderbird Invitational. In 1970 the tournament was re branded as the Phoenix Thunderbird Open, and was the final year as a combined event when the men's tournament was discontinued.

In 1971, women's event became part of the Virginia Slims Circuit and was known as the Virginia Slims Thunderbird Classic, that event carried on till 1980 when it was last known as the Thunderbird Classic before it too was abolished. The tournament was originally played on indoor hard courts from 1953 to 1965, then outdoor hard courts from 1966 to 1970. The event was originally played at the end February annually, then moved to mid to late March. It was only in 1970 that its scheduling was moved to October that year, however the women's event carried on with the new dates.

== Finals ==
=== Singles ===
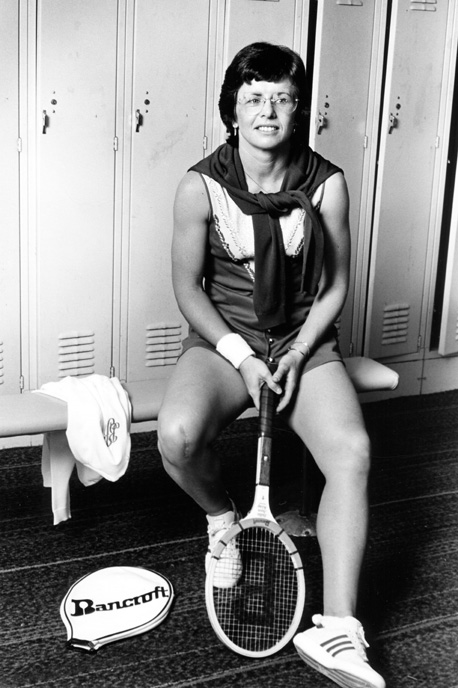
Billie Jean King seen here in 1978, won the last of her 5 Phoenix titles in 1977.

Year	Winners	Runners-up	Score
Phoenix Thunderbird Invitational
1953	(United States) Anita Kanter	(United States) Dorothy Bundy Cheney	3–6, 6–4, 6–3
1954	(United States) Beverly Baker Fleitz	(United States) Helen Pastall Perez	6–4, 7–5
1955	(United States) Beverly Baker Fleitz (2)	(United States) Pat Canning Todd	6–1, 6–1
1956	(United States) Beverly Baker Fleitz (3)	(United States) Mary Ann Mitchell	6–1, 6–1
1957	(United States) Louise Brough	(United States) Pat Canning Todd	2–6, 6–3, 6–4
1958	(United States) Beverly Baker Fleitz (4)	(United States) Louise Brough	6–2, 3–6, 10–8
1959	(United States) Vicky Palmer	(United States) Barbara Green	3–6, 6–1, 7–5
1960	(United States) Karen Hantze	(United States) Vicki Palmer	7–5, 9–7
1961	(United States) Nancy Richey	(United States) Darlene Hard	6–3, 6–4
Phoenix Thunderbird Invitation
1962	(United States) Nancy Richey (2)	(United States) Karen Hantze Susman	6–3, 7–5
1963	(United States) Nancy Richey (3)	(United States) Vicki Palmer	8–6, 8–6
1964	(United States) Jane Albert	(United States) Mimi Arnold	6–3, 7–5
1965	(United States) Justina Bricka	(United States) Jane Albert	6–2, 6–4
1966	(United States) Billie Jean Moffitt King	(United States) Mary-Ann Eisel	6–3, 6–2
1967	(United States) Nancy Richey (4)	(United States) Carol Aucamp	6–1, 6–4
1968	(United States) Patti Hogan	(United States) Tory Ann Fretz	6–2, 6–4
↓ Open Era ↓
1969	(United States) Nancy Richey (5)	(United States) Patti Hogan	6–2, 6–0.
Phoenix Thunderbird Open
1970	(Canada) Vicki Berner	(United States) Stephanie Tolleson	6–3, 6–2
Virginia Slims Thunderbird Classic
1971	(United States) Billie Jean King (2)	(United States) Rosie Casals	7–5, 6–1
1972	(United States) Billie Jean King (3)	(Australia) Margaret Smith Court	7–6^{(7–3)}, 6–3
Virginia Slims of Phoenix
1973	(United States) Billie Jean King (4)	(United States) Nancy Richey Gunter	6–1, 6–3
1974	(United Kingdom) Virginia Wade	(Australia) Helen Gourlay	6–1, 6–2
Thunderbird Classic
1975	(United States) Nancy Richey Gunter (6)	(United Kingdom) Virginia Wade	4–6, 7–5, 6–4
1976	(United States) Chris Evert	(Australia) Dianne Fromholtz	6–1, 7–5
1977	(United States) Billie Jean King (5)	(Australia) Wendy Turnbull	1–6, 6–1, 6–0
1978	(United States) Martina Navratilova	(United States) Tracy Austin	6–4, 6–2
1979	(United States) Martina Navratilova (2)	(United States) Chris Evert	6–1, 6–3
1980	(Czechoslovakia) Regina Maršíková	(Australia) Wendy Turnbull	7–6^{(10–8)}, 7–6^{(7–3)}

=== Doubles ===
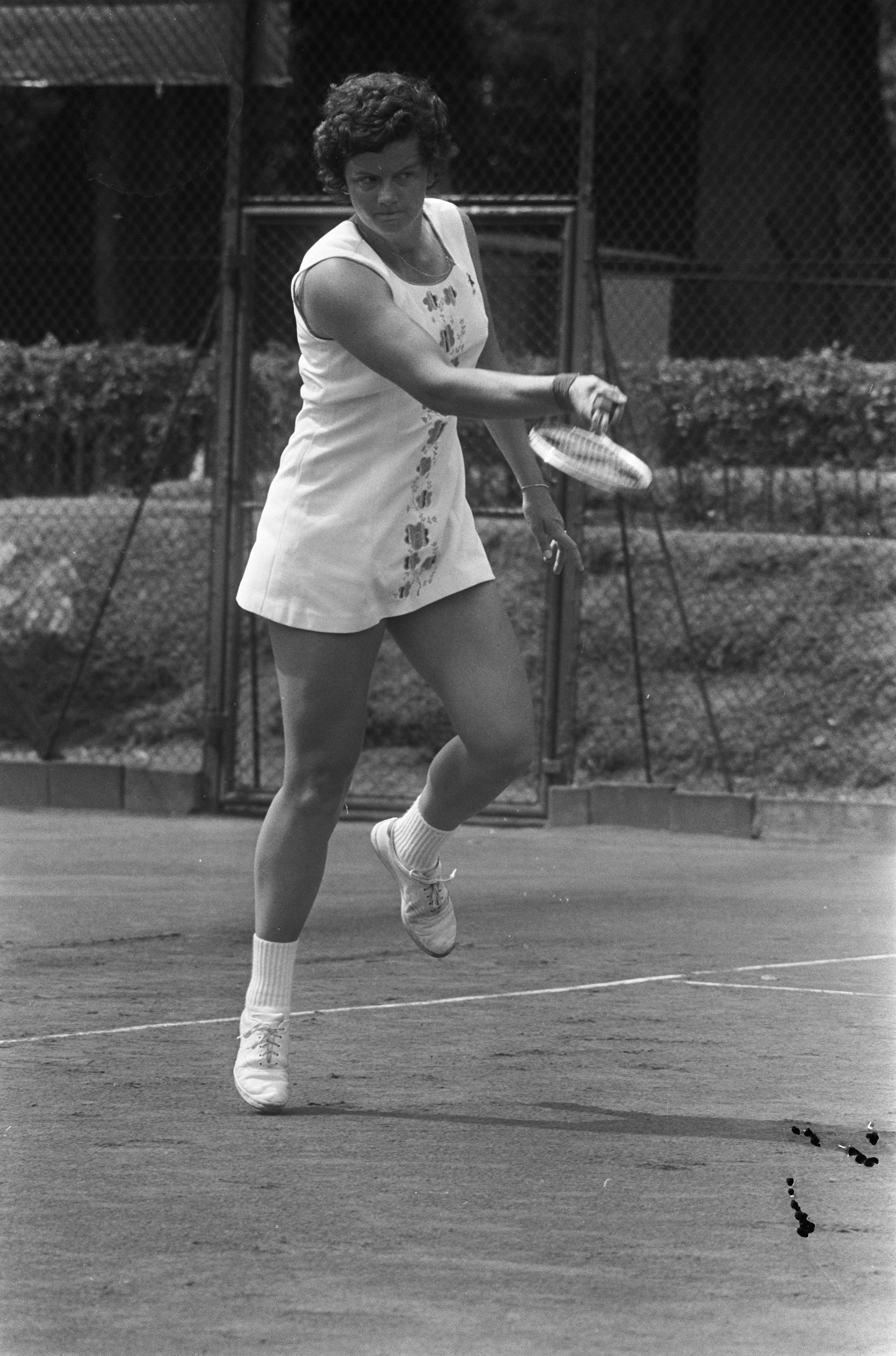
Betty Stove seen here in 1973, won 5 Phoenix doubles titles.

Year	Champion	Runner-up	Score
1971	(United States) Rosie Casals (United States) Billie Jean King	(France) Françoise Dürr (Australia) Judy Tegart Dalton	6–3, 6–2
1972	(United States) Rosie Casals (2) (United States) Wendy Overton	(France) Françoise Dürr (Netherlands) Betty Stöve	6–4, 6–3
1973	(Australia) Kerry Harris (Australia) Kerry Melville	(United States) Rosie Casals (United States) Billie Jean King	6–4, 6–4
1974	(France) Françoise Dürr (Netherlands) Betty Stöve	(United States) Mona Schallau (United States) Pam Teeguarden	6–3, 5–7, 6–3
1975	(France) Françoise Dürr (2) (Netherlands) Betty Stöve (2)	(United States) Rosie Casals (Czechoslovakia) Martina Navratilova	6–7, 6–4, 6–0
1976	(United States) Billie Jean King (2) (Netherlands) Betty Stöve (3)	(South Africa) Linky Boshoff (South Africa) Ilana Kloss	6–2, 6–1
1977	(United States) Billie Jean King (3) (United States) Martina Navratilova	(Australia) Helen Gourlay Cawley (United States) JoAnne Russell	6–1, 7–5
1978	(United States) Tracy Austin (Netherlands) Betty Stöve (4)	(United States) Martina Navratilova (United States) Anne Smith	6–4, 6–7, 6–2
1979	(Netherlands) Betty Stöve (5) (Australia) Wendy Turnbull	(United States) Rosie Casals (United States) Chris Evert	6–4, 7–6
1980	(United States) Pam Shriver (United States) Paula Smith	(United States) Ann Kiyomura (United States) Candy Reynolds	6–0, 6–4

== See also ==
- Arizona Tennis Classic (successor men's event)
- Phoenix Thunderbird Open (men's event)
- Virginia Slims of Arizona
