= 1976 Thunderbird Classic =

Women's tennis tournament in Arizona

- Date: October 4–10
- Edition: 6th
- Category: WTA Tour
- Draw: 53S / 16D
- Prize money: $60,000
- Surface: Hard / outdoor
- Location: Phoenix, United States
- Venue: Arizona Biltmore Hotel

Champions

Singles
- (United States) Chris Evert

Doubles
- (United States) Billie Jean King / (Netherlands) Betty Stöve
← 1975 ·	Thunderbird Classic	· 1977 →

The 1976 Thunderbird Classic, also known by its sponsored name Talley Industries Phoenix Thunderbird Women's Tournament, was a women's singles tennis tournament played on outdoor hard courts at the Arizona Biltmore Hotel in Phoenix, Arizona in the United States. The event was part of the 1976 WTA Tour. It was the sixth edition of the tournament and was held from October 4 through October 10, 1976. First-seeded Chris Evert won the singles title and earned $14,000 first-prize money.

== Finals ==
=== Singles ===
(United States) Chris Evert defeated (Australia) Dianne Fromholtz 6–1, 7–5

=== Doubles ===
(United States) Billie Jean King / (Netherlands) Betty Stöve defeated (South Africa) Linky Boshoff / (South Africa) Ilana Kloss 6–2, 6–1

== Prize money ==
Event	W	F	3rd	4th	QF	Round of 16	Round of 32	Round of 64
Singles	$14,000	$7,200	$3,750	$3,000	$1,600	$900	$500	$350
