= Miloslava Holubová =

Czech tennis player

- Country (sports): Czechoslovakia
- Born: 2 October 1949 (age 75)

Singles

Grand Slam singles results
- French Open: QF (1976)
- Wimbledon: 2R (1971)

Doubles

Grand Slam doubles results
- French Open: 2R (1976)
- Wimbledon: 2R (1971)

Grand Slam mixed doubles results
- Wimbledon: 1R (1971)

Miloslava "Míla" Holubová (born 2 October 1949) is a Czech former professional tennis player.

Holubová made a surprise run to the final eight of the 1976 French Open, with wins over Maria Bueno, Gail Lovera and Wendy Turnbull. She was beaten in the quarter-finals by Virginia Ruzici.
