= 1978 Thunderbird Classic =

Women's tennis tournament in Arizona

- Date: October 2–8
- Edition: 8th
- Category: Colgate Series (AA)
- Draw: 32S/16D
- Prize money: $75,000
- Surface: Hard / outdoor
- Location: Phoenix, United States
- Venue: Arizona Biltmore Hotel

Champions

Singles
- (United States) Martina Navratilova

Doubles
- (United States) Tracy Austin / (Netherlands) Betty Stöve
← 1977 ·	Thunderbird Classic	· 1979 →

The 1978 Thunderbird Classic was a women's singles tennis tournament played on outdoor hard courts at the Arizona Biltmore Hotel in Phoenix, Arizona in the United States. The event was part of the AA (Note: Tournaments with prize money for the women of at least $75,000.) category of the 1978 Colgate Series. It was the eighth edition of the tournament and was held from October 2 through October 8, 1978. First-seeded Martina Navratilova won the singles title and earned $14,000 first-prize money.

== Finals ==
=== Singles ===
(United States) Martina Navratilova defeated (United States) Tracy Austin 6–4, 6–2

- It was Navratilova's 11th title of the year and the 24th of her career.

=== Doubles ===
(United States) Tracy Austin / (Netherlands) Betty Stöve defeated (United States) Martina Navratilova / (United States) Anne Smith 6–4, 6–7, 6–2

== Prize money ==
Event	W	F	3rd	4th	QF	Round of 16	Round of 32
Singles	$14,000	$7,000	$4,200	$3,500	$1,850	$1,000	$550
