= 1979 Thunderbird Classic =

Women's singles tennis tournament in Arizona

- Date: October 10–14
- Edition: 9th
- Category: Colgate Series (AAA)
- Draw: 32S/16D
- Prize money: $100,000
- Surface: Hard / outdoor
- Location: Phoenix, United States
- Venue: Arizona Biltmore Hotel

Champions

Singles
- (United States) Martina Navratilova

Doubles
- (United States) Tracy Austin / (Netherlands) Betty Stöve
← 1978 ·	Thunderbird Classic	· 1980 →

The 1979 Thunderbird Classic was a women's singles tennis tournament played on outdoor hard courts at the Arizona Biltmore Hotel in Phoenix, Arizona in the United States. The event was part of the AAA (Note: Tournaments with prize money for the women of at least $100,000.) category of the 1979 Colgate Series. It was the ninth edition of the tournament and was held from October 10 through October 14, 1979. First-seeded Martina Navratilova successfully defended her 1978 title by winning the singles event and earned $20,000 first-prize money.

== Winners ==
=== Singles ===
(United States) Martina Navratilova defeated (United States) Chris Evert 6–1, 6–3

- It was Navratilova's 9th title of the year and the 33rd of her career.

=== Doubles ===
(Netherlands) Betty Stöve / (Australia) Wendy Turnbull defeated (United States) Rosie Casals / (United States) Chris Evert 6–4, 7–6^{(7–4)}

== Prize money ==
Event	W	F	3rd	4th	QF	Round of 16	Round of 32
Singles	$20,000	$10,000	$4,950	$4,650	$2,100	$1,100	$550
