= Marita Redondo =

American tennis player (born 1956)

- Country (sports): United States
- Born: February 19, 1956 (age 70) San Diego, United States
- Height: 5 ft 5 in (1.65 m)
- Plays: Right-handed
- Prize money: US$ 156,176

Singles
- Career titles: 0

Grand Slam singles results
- French Open: 3R (1976)
- Wimbledon: 3R (1978)
- US Open: 4R (1978)

Doubles
- Career titles: 4

Grand Slam doubles results
- French Open: 2R (1976, 1979)
- Wimbledon: 3R (1973)
- US Open: 3R (1980)

Grand Slam mixed doubles results
- French Open: 2R (1976, 1979)
- US Open: 2R (1973)

Marita Redondo (born February 19, 1956) is an American former tennis player who was active during the 1970s and early 1980s.

Her best singles performance at a Grand Slam tournament was reaching the fourth round at the 1978 US Open where she lost in three sets to Wendy Turnbull. At both the French Open (1976) and Wimbledon (1978) she reached the third round in the singles, losing to Virginia Ruzici and Ruta Gerulaitis respectively.

In 1973, at age 17, she played on the Wightman Cup, an annual women's team tennis competition between the United States and Great Britain, partnering Chris Evert in the first doubles rubber. Redondo played World Team Tennis for the Los Angeles Strings in 1974, the San Diego Friars in 1975 and the Seattle Cascades in 1978.

In January 1978 she won the Avon Futures of San Diego, defeating Pat Medrado in the final in straight sets. At the Futures Championships in Atlanta in March she was runner-up to Julie Anthony.

Redondo was inducted into the San Diego Tennis Hall of Fame in 2012.

== WTA career finals ==
=== Singles (1 runner-up) ===
Result	W–L	Date	Tournament	Surface	Opponent	Score
Loss	0–1	Aug 1973	Atlantic City Tennis Classic, US	Hard	(United States) Chris Evert	2–6, 5–7

=== Doubles (4 titles, 4 runner-ups) ===
Result	W–L	Date	Tournament	Surface	Partner	Opponents	Score
Win	1–0	Aug 1973	Atlantic City Tennis Classic, US	Hard	(United States) Chris Evert	(South Africa) Ilana Kloss (South Africa) Pat Walkden	6–4, 6–4
Win	2–0	Oct 1973	Aberavon Cup, Great Britain	Carpet (i)	(United Kingdom) Virginia Wade	(United States) Julie Heldman (United States) Ann Kiyomura	4–6, 6–3, 7–6
Win	3–0	Nov 1973	Edinburgh Cup, Great Britain	Carpet (i)	(United Kingdom) Virginia Wade	(United States) Julie Heldman (United States) Ann Kiyomura	6–1, 2–6, 6–4
Win	4–0	Nov 1973	Billingham Cup, Great Britain	Carpet (i)	(United Kingdom) Virginia Wade	(United Kingdom) Glynis Coles (United States) Sharon Walsh	6–7, 6–3, 6–2
Loss	4–1	Aug 1974	Medi-Quick Open, US	Grass	(United States) Kathleen Harter	(United States) Ann Kiyomura (United States) Pam Teeguarden	2–6, 0–6
Loss	4–2	Mar 1976	Virginia Slims of Dallas, US	Carpet (i)	(South Africa) Greer Stevens	(United States) Mona Guerrant (United States) Ann Kiyomura	3–6, 6–4, 4–6
Loss	4–3	Feb 1978	Virginia Slims of Seattle, US	Carpet (i)	(United States) Patricia Bostrom	(Australia) Kerry Reid (Australia) Wendy Turnbull	2–6, 3–6
Loss	4–4	Mar 1981	Avon Championships of Los Angeles, US	Carpet (i)	(United States) Peanut Louie	(United Kingdom) Sue Barker (United States) Ann Kiyomura	1–6, 6–4, 1–6

== Futures finals ==
=== Singles (1 title, 1 runner-up) ===
Result	No.	Year	Tournament	Surface	Opponent	Score
Win	1.	1978	Avon Futures of San Diego, US	Carpet (i)	(Brazil) Pat Medrado	6–2, 6–4
Loss	1.	1978	Avon Futures Championships, US	Carpet (i)	(United States) Julie Anthony	3–6, 3–6
