= 1976 French Open =

- Date: 31 May – 14 June 1976
- Edition: 75
- Category: 46th Grand Slam (ITF)
- Prize money: $204,000
- Surface: Clay / outdoor
- Location: Paris (XVI^{e}), France
- Venue: Stade Roland Garros

Champions

Men's singles
- (Italy) Adriano Panatta

Women's singles
- (United Kingdom) Sue Barker

Men's doubles
- (United States) Frederick McNair / (United States) Sherwood Stewart

Women's doubles
- (Uruguay) Fiorella Bonicelli / (France) Gail Sherriff Chanfreau Lovera

Mixed doubles
- (South Africa) Ilana Kloss / (Australia) Kim Warwick
- French Open

The 1976 French Open was a tennis tournament that took place on the outdoor clay courts at the Stade Roland Garros in Paris, France. The tournament ran from 31 May until 14 June. It was the 75th staging of the French Open, and the second Grand Slam tennis event of 1976.

== Finals ==
=== Men's singles ===
(Italy) Adriano Panatta defeated (United States) Harold Solomon, 6–1, 6–4, 4–6, 7–6^{(7–3)}

- It was Panatta's 1st (and only) career Grand Slam title.

=== Women's singles ===
(United Kingdom) Sue Barker defeated (Czechoslovakia) Renáta Tomanová, 6–2, 0–6, 6–2

- It was Barker's 1st (and only) career Grand Slam title.

=== Men's doubles ===
(United States) Frederick McNair / (United States) Sherwood Stewart defeated (United States) Brian Gottfried / (Mexico) Raúl Ramírez, 7–6^{(8-6)}, 6–3, 6–1

=== Women's doubles ===
(Uruguay) Fiorella Bonicelli / (France) Gail Sherriff Chanfreau Lovera defeated (United States) Kathleen Harter / (West Germany) Helga Niessen Masthoff, 6–4, 1–6, 6–3

=== Mixed doubles ===
(South Africa) Ilana Kloss / (Australia) Kim Warwick defeated (South Africa) Delina Boshoff / (Rhodesia) Colin Dowdeswell, 5–7, 7–6, 6–2

== Prize money ==
Event		W	F	SF	QF	4R	3R	2R	1R
Singles	Men	FF130,000	FF65,000	FF32,000	FF17,000	FF10,000	FF5,000	FF2,800	FF1,500
Singles	Women	FF30,000	FF15,000	FF7,500	FF3,000	-	FF2,000	FF1,000	FF650

Preceded by 1976 Australian Open	Grand Slams	Succeeded by 1976 Wimbledon Championships
