= Glynis Coles =

Professional English tennis player

- Country (sports): (United Kingdom) Great Britain
- Born: 20 February 1954 (age 71) London, England
- Height: 5 ft 8 in (1.73 m)
- Turned pro: 1970
- Retired: 1988
- Plays: Right-handed

Singles
- Career record: 33–87
- Career titles: 0 WTA, 0 ITF

Grand Slam singles results
- Australian Open: 2R (1973)
- French Open: 2R (1974, 1976, 1981)
- Wimbledon: 4R (1973, 1975)
- US Open: 3R (1976, 1981)

Doubles
- Career record: 40–81
- Career titles: 0 WTA, 0 ITF

Grand Slam doubles results
- Australian Open: QF (1973, 1975)
- French Open: QF (1975, 1976, 1981)
- Wimbledon: QF (1975, 1978)
- US Open: QF (1975)

Grand Slam mixed doubles results
- French Open: 1R (1976, 1981)
- Wimbledon: 3R (1973, 1975)

Glynis Coles (born 20 February 1954), also known by her married name Glynis Coles-Bond, is a retired English professional tennis player and former British number 2.

== Career ==
Coles played professionally from 1970 to1988, playing both singles and doubles. Her best singles results in a Grand Slam tournament were at Wimbledon, where she advanced to the round of 16 in 1973 and 1975, losing both times to Margaret Court. As a doubles player, she reached the quarterfinals of many Grand Slam contests, most notably in 1975, when she and Sue Barker made the quarterfinals of all of the Grand Slam events in the same year. Coles won the women's singles title at the Swedish Open in 1973, and she and Barker won the women's doubles title there in 1974.

She made nine appearances for the British Fed Cup squad in 1974, 1975, and 1980.

== WTA finals ==
=== Doubles (1 runner-up) ===
Result	W-L	Date	Tournament	Surface	Partner	Opponents	Score
Loss	0–1	Feb 1976	Akron, United States	Carpet (i)	(Romania) Florența Mihai	(South Africa) Brigitte Cuypers (United States) Mona Guerrant	4–6, 6–7

== Performance timelines ==
Key
W	F	SF	QF	#R	RR	Q#	DNQ	A	NH

(W) winner; (F) finalist; (SF) semifinalist; (QF) quarterfinalist; (#R) rounds 4, 3, 2, 1; (RR) round-robin stage; (Q#) qualification round; (DNQ) did not qualify; (A) absent; (NH) not held; (SR) strike rate (events won / competed); (W–L) win–loss record.
- " * " - Coles received a bye in the first round.
- " ^ " - Coles withdrew prior to the match, which is not counted as a loss.

=== Singles ===
Tournament	1971	1972	1973	1974	1975	1976	1977		1978	1979	1980	1981	1982	1983	1984	1985	1986	1987	W–L	SR
Grand Slam tournaments
Australian Open	Absent		3R*	A	1R	A	A ^{(Jan)}	A ^{(Dec)}	Absent										1–2	0 / 2
French Open	Absent		1R	2R	1R	2R	1R		1R	A	1R	2R*	1R	A	1R	Absent			2–10	0 / 10
Wimbledon	1R	1R	4R*	2R*	4R*	1R	1R		1R	2R	1R	3R	1R	Q1	Q1	A	1R	Q1	7–13	0 / 13
US Open	Absent		1R	A	1R	3R*	2R		2R	Q2	1R	3R	1R	Absent					5–8	0 / 8
Win–loss	0–1	0–1	3–4	1–2	2–4	2–3	1–3		1–3	1–1	0–3	4–3	0–3	0–0	0–1	0–0	0–1	0–0	16–33	0 / 33
Year-end ranking	N/A				39	66	62		92	67	122	57	139	183	285	Unranked				

=== Doubles ===
Tournament	1972	1973	1974	1975	1976	1977		1978	1979	1980	1981	1982	1983	1984– 1990	1991	W–L	SR
Australian Open	A	QF*	A	QF*	A	(Jan); A	(Dec); A	A	A	A	A	A	A	A	A	2–2	0 / 2
French Open	A	A	1R	QF*	QF*	1R		1R	A	1R	QF	1R	A	A	A	5–8	0 / 8
Wimbledon	1R	2R	2R*	QF*	2R*	1R		QF^{1}	1R	1R	1R	1R	Q2	A	Q1	5–11	0 / 11
US Open	A	2R	A	QF^	3R*	1R		A	A	1R	1R	1R	A	A	A	3–7	0 / 7
Win–loss	2–2	6–3	4–4	1–2		3–2		6–2	7–2	0–2	0–1	1–3	0–2	0–1	1–3	33–25	0 / 26

- 1 - Coles received a walkover in the third round, which is not counted as a win.

=== Mixed doubles ===
Tournament	1973	1974	1975	1976	1977	1978	1979	1980	1981	W–L	SR
Australian Open	Absent									0–0	0 / 0
French Open	Absent			1R	Absent				1R	0–2	0 / 2
Wimbledon	3R*	2R*	3R	Absent						3–3	0 / 3
US Open	Absent									0–0	0 / 0
Win–loss	1–1	0–1	2–1	0–1	0–0	0–0	0–0	0–0	0–1	3–5	0 / 5

== See also ==
- Mildred Coles - Glynis's great-aunt, who competed at the 1908 Olympics in tennis
