= Kathy Kuykendall =

American tennis player

- Country (sports): United States
- Born: November 23, 1956 (age 68); Houston, U.S.
- Plays: Right-handed

Singles

Grand Slam singles results
- French Open: QF (1976)
- Wimbledon: 2R (1976)
- US Open: 4R (1976, 1977)

Kathy Kuykendall (born November 23, 1956) is a former American tennis player. She was ranked sixth in the United States in 1974, seventh in 1975, and tenth in 1976. She reached the quarterfinals in the singles event of the French Open in 1976 which she lost in three sets to Florența Mihai.
