= Helga Niessen Masthoff =

West German tennis player

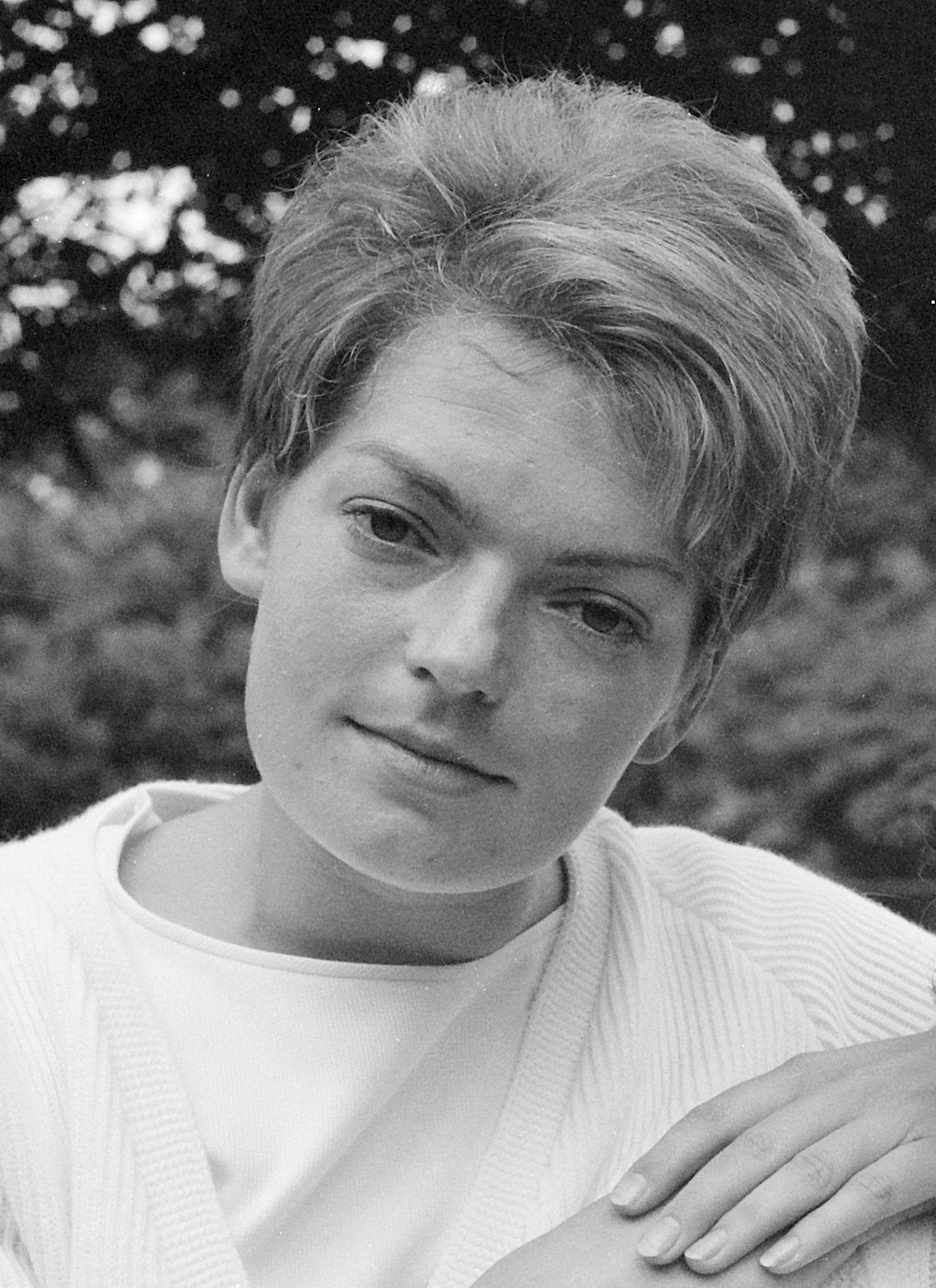
- Helga Niessen-Masthoff in 1965
- ITF name: Helga Masthoff
- Country (sports): West Germany
- Born: 11 November 1941 (age 84) Essen, Germany
- Height: 1.83 m (6 ft 0 in)
- Plays: Right-handed (one handed backhand)

Singles
- Career record: 68–33
- Highest ranking: No. 6 (1970)

Grand Slam singles results
- Australian Open: QF (1976)
- French Open: F (1970)
- Wimbledon: QF (1970, 1974)
- US Open: SF (1973)

Doubles
- Career record: 38–22

Grand Slam doubles results
- Australian Open: 2R (1976)
- French Open: F (1976)
- Wimbledon: QF (1968, 1971)

Mixed doubles

Grand Slam mixed doubles results
- Australian Open: 2R (1965)
- French Open: 1R (1964)

Helga Niessen Masthoff (née Niessen; born 11 November 1941) is a former tennis player from West Germany. Her best Grand Slam singles tournament was when she reached the 1970 French Open final, losing to Margaret Court in straight sets. She won the German Open three consecutive years from 1972 through 1974, beating Martina Navratilova in the 1974 final, in three sets. Masthoff was the runner-up at that tournament in 1971, losing to Billie Jean King.

She won the German national singles title on ten occasions (1965, 1966, 1968, 1969, 1971, 1972, 1975, 1976, 1977 and 1978).

At the 1968 Olympic Games in Mexico City when tennis was a demonstration sport, Masthoff won the singles and doubles (with Edda Buding) gold medals and the silver medal in mixed doubles (with Jürgen Faßbender).

Masthoff teamed with Kathleen Harter to reach the women's doubles final at the 1976 French Open, losing to the team of Fiorella Bonicelli and Gail Sherriff Lovera 6–4, 1–6, 6–3. Masthoff played on West Germany's Fed Cup team from 1965 to 1967, in 1969 and 1970, and from 1972 through 1977. Her overall win–loss record was 38–18, 23–10 in singles and 15–8 in doubles.

According to Bud Collins, Masthoff was ranked in the world top 10 in 1970, 1971, and 1973, reaching a career high of world No. 6 in 1970.

In 1970, she received the Silbernes Lorbeerblatt (Silver Laurel Leaf), the highest sports award in Germany.

== Grand Slam finals ==
=== Singles: 1 (runner-up) ===
Result	Year	Championship	Surface	Opponent	Score
Loss	1970	French Open	Clay	(Australia) Margaret Court	2–6, 4–6

=== Doubles: 1 (runner-up) ===
Result	Year	Championship	Surface	Partner	Opponents	Score
Loss	1976	French Open	Clay	(United States) Kathleen Harter	(France) Gail Sheriff (Uruguay) Fiorella Bonicelli	4–6, 6–1, 3–6

== Grand Slam singles performance ==
Key
W	F	SF	QF	#R	RR	Q#	DNQ	A	NH

(W) winner; (F) finalist; (SF) semifinalist; (QF) quarterfinalist; (#R) rounds 4, 3, 2, 1; (RR) round-robin stage; (Q#) qualification round; (DNQ) did not qualify; (A) absent; (NH) not held; (SR) strike rate (events won / competed); (W–L) win–loss record.

Tournament	1963	1964	1965	1966	1967	1968	1969	1970	1971	1972	1973	1974	1975	1976	1977	1978	Career SR
Australia	A	A	1R	A	A	A	A	A	A	A	A	A	A	QF	A / A	A	0 / 2
France	A	2R	1R	2R	A	A	A	F	1R	SF	QF	SF	2R	QF	3R	QF	0 / 12
Wimbledon	2R	3R	2R	1R	A	2R	A	QF	3R	2R	A	QF	A	A	2R	A	0 / 10
United States	2R	A	A	A	A	A	A	A	A	A	SF	A	A	A	A	A	0 / 2
SR	0 / 2	0 / 2	0 / 3	0 / 2	0 / 0	0 / 1	0 / 0	0 / 2	0 / 2	0 / 2	0 / 2	0 / 2	0 / 1	0 / 2	0 / 2	0 / 1	0 / 26

Note: The Australian Open was held twice in 1977 (in January and December).

== See also ==
- Performance timelines for all female tennis players since 1978 who reached at least one Grand Slam final
