= Kathleen Harter =

American tennis player (born 1946)

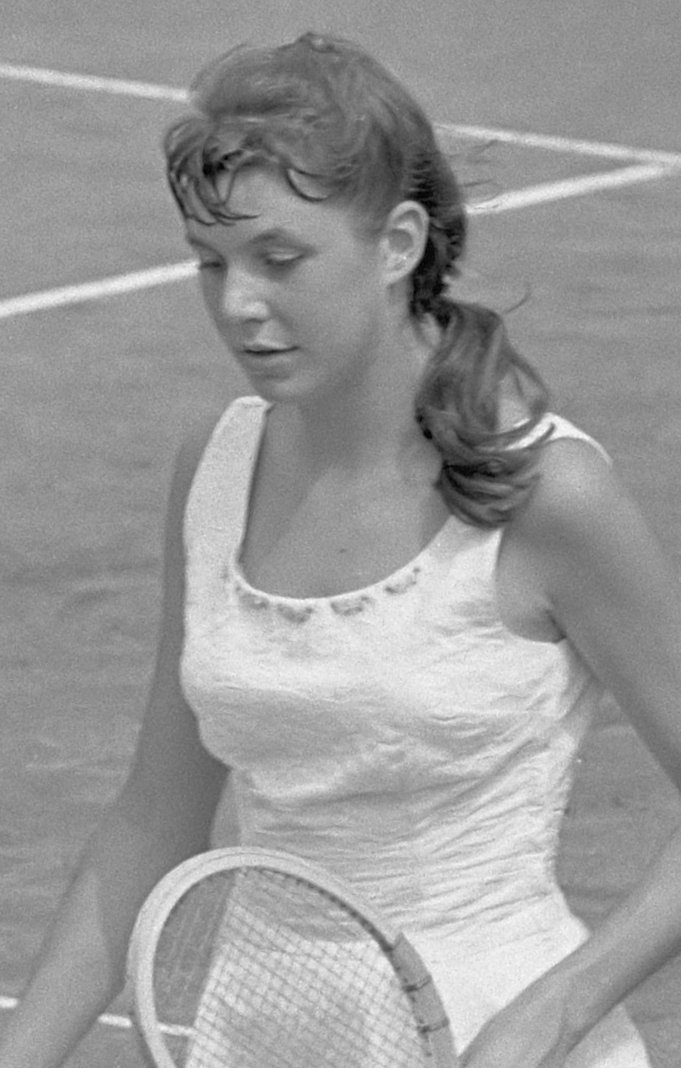
- Country (sports): United States
- Born: October 27, 1946 (age 79) Los Angeles, U.S.

Grand Slam singles results
- Australian Open: QF (1968, 1977)
- French Open: 3R (1967)
- Wimbledon: SF (1967)
- US Open: 3R (1964, 1968, 1977)

Grand Slam doubles results
- Australian Open: SF (1976)
- French Open: F (1976)
- Wimbledon: QF (1968)

Grand Slam mixed doubles results
- Wimbledon: QF (1970)

Kathleen Harter (born October 27, 1946) is a former nationally ranked tennis player from the United States. She was taught by legendary coach Dick Skeen at the Balboa Bay Club in Newport Beach, California. She was ranked no. 7 in the United States in 1965, no. 8 in 1967, and no. 5 in 1968. She reached the semifinals at Wimbledon in 1967 and the quarterfinals at the Australian Open in 1968. In doubles, she reached the semifinals of the Australian in 1976, the finals of the French in 1976, and the quarterfinals of Wimbledon in 1968. Her married name is Kathleen Shubin, and she lives in Austin, Texas. She had a brother named Craig, who died of Cancer in California.

== Grand Slam finals ==
=== Doubles (1 runner-up) ===
Result	Year	Championship	Surface	Partner	Opponents	Score
Loss	1976	French Open	Clay	(West Germany) Helga Niessen Masthoff	(France) Gail Sheriff (Uruguay) Fiorella Bonicelli	4–6, 6–1, 3–6
