= Fiorella Bonicelli =

Uruguayan tennis player (born 1951)

- Country (sports): Uruguay
- Born: 21 December 1951 (age 74) Lima, Peru
- Turned pro: 1967
- Retired: 1978

Singles
- Career record: 152–112
- Career titles: 13

Grand Slam singles results
- Australian Open: 2R (1967)
- French Open: QF (1978)
- Wimbledon: 3R (1974)
- US Open: 4R (1972)

Doubles

Grand Slam doubles results
- French Open: W (1976)
- Wimbledon: SF (1973)
- US Open: 3R (1972)

Grand Slam mixed doubles results
- French Open: W (1975)
- Wimbledon: QF (1971)
- US Open: 2R (1969)

Fiorella Bonicelli (born 21 December 1951) is a retired professional tennis player from Uruguay. She was born in Lima, Peru but grew up in Montevideo, Uruguay where she started playing tennis when at age 11. During her career, she won the 1975 French Open mixed doubles title with Thomaz Koch. She also won the 1976 French Open women's doubles title with Gail Lovera, defeating Kathleen Harter and Helga Niessen Masthoff 6–4, 1–6, 6–3. At the Fed Cup, her singles record is 11–4, and doubles record 6–8. During her career, she reached one Grand Slam singles quarterfinal, at the 1978 French Open, where she lost to Virginia Ruzici in three sets.

== Grand Slam finals ==
=== Doubles: (1 title) ===
Result	Year	Championship	Surface	Partner	Opponents	Score
Win	1976	French Open	Clay	(France) Gail Lovera	(United States) Kathleen Harter (West Germany) Helga Niessen Masthoff	6–4, 1–6, 6–3

=== Mixed doubles: (1 title) ===
Result	Year	Championship	Surface	Partner	Opponents	Score
Win	1975	French Open	Clay	(Brazil) Thomaz Koch	(Chile) Jaime Fillol (United States) Pam Teeguarden	6–4, 7–6
