= Gail Chanfreau =

Australian-French tennis player

- ITF name: Gail Benedetti
- Country (sports): Australia; France
- Born: 3 April 1945 (age 81) Bondi, New South Wales
- Plays: Right-handed

Grand Slam singles results
- Australian Open: QF (1967, 1972)
- French Open: QF (1968, 1971)
- Wimbledon: 3R (1966, 1970)
- US Open: 3R (1971)

Grand Slam doubles results
- Australian Open: SF (1968, 1972)
- French Open: W (1967, 1970, 1971, 1976)
- Wimbledon: SF (1971, 1975)
- US Open: F (1971)

Grand Slam mixed doubles results
- Australian Open: QF (1965, 1966)
- French Open: SF (1971)
- Wimbledon: 3R (1969, 1974, 1975)
- US Open: QF (1970)

Team competitions
- Fed Cup: 27–26

Gail Chanfreau (née Sherriff; born 3 April 1945), also known as Gail Lovera and Gail Benedetti, is a French former amateur and professional tennis player.

== Tennis career ==
Chanfreau was born in Australia, but moved to France in 1968. Chanfreau made her first appearance in the Federation Cup for Australia in 1966. She played for the France Fed Cup team from 1969 to 1980.

When Gail beat her sister Carol Sherriff, who reached the third round of the Australian Open on five occasions, 8–10, 6–3, 6–3 in the 1966 Wimbledon Championships second round, that was the second match between sisters at Wimbledon, the first being in the 1884 Wimbledon Championships when Maud Watson beat Lillian. The next Wimbledon match between sisters was in 2000 between Serena and Venus Williams.

Chanfreau reached the quarterfinals of the Australian Open in 1967 and 1972 as well as the quarterfinals of the French Open in 1968 and 1971. She won the French Open doubles in 1967, 1970 and 1971 with Françoise Dürr and 1976 with Fiorella Bonicelli.

At the Cincinnati Masters, she reached the singles final in 1969, losing to Lesley Turner Bowrey.

She was international veterans mixed-doubles champion in 1968 and 1975 with Pierre Darmon.

== Personal life ==
She married French tennis player Jean-Baptiste Chanfreau in 1968 and moved to France. Her second marriage was to Jean Lovera, another French tennis player. In 2005 she married Jean-Philippe Benedetti.

== Grand Slam tournament finals ==
=== Doubles: 7 (4 titles, 3 runner-ups) ===
Result	Year	Championship	Surface	Partner	Opponents	Score
Win	1967	French Championships	Clay	(France) Françoise Dürr	(South Africa) Annette Van Zyl (South Africa) Pat Walkden	6–2, 6–2
Win	1970	French Open	Clay	(France) Françoise Dürr	(United States) Rosemary Casals (United States) Billie Jean King	6–1, 3–6, 6–3
Win	1971	French Open	Clay	(France) Françoise Dürr	(Australia) Helen Gourlay (Australia) Kerry Harris	6–4, 6–1
Loss	1971	US Open	Grass	(France) Françoise Dürr	(United States) Rosemary Casals (Australia) Judy Tegart	3–6, 3–6
Loss	1974	French Open	Clay	(West Germany) Katja Burgemeister	(United States) Chris Evert (Soviet Union) Olga Morozova	4–6, 6–2, 1–6
Win	1976	French Open	Clay	(Uruguay) Fiorella Bonicelli	(United States) Kathleen Harter (West Germany) Helga Masthoff	6–4, 1–6, 6–3
Loss	1978	French Open	Clay	(Australia) Lesley Turner	(Socialist Federal Republic of Yugoslavia) Mima Jaušovec (Romania) Virginia Ruzici	7–5, 4–6, 6–8
