= Ilana Kloss =

South African tennis player, coach, and commissioner

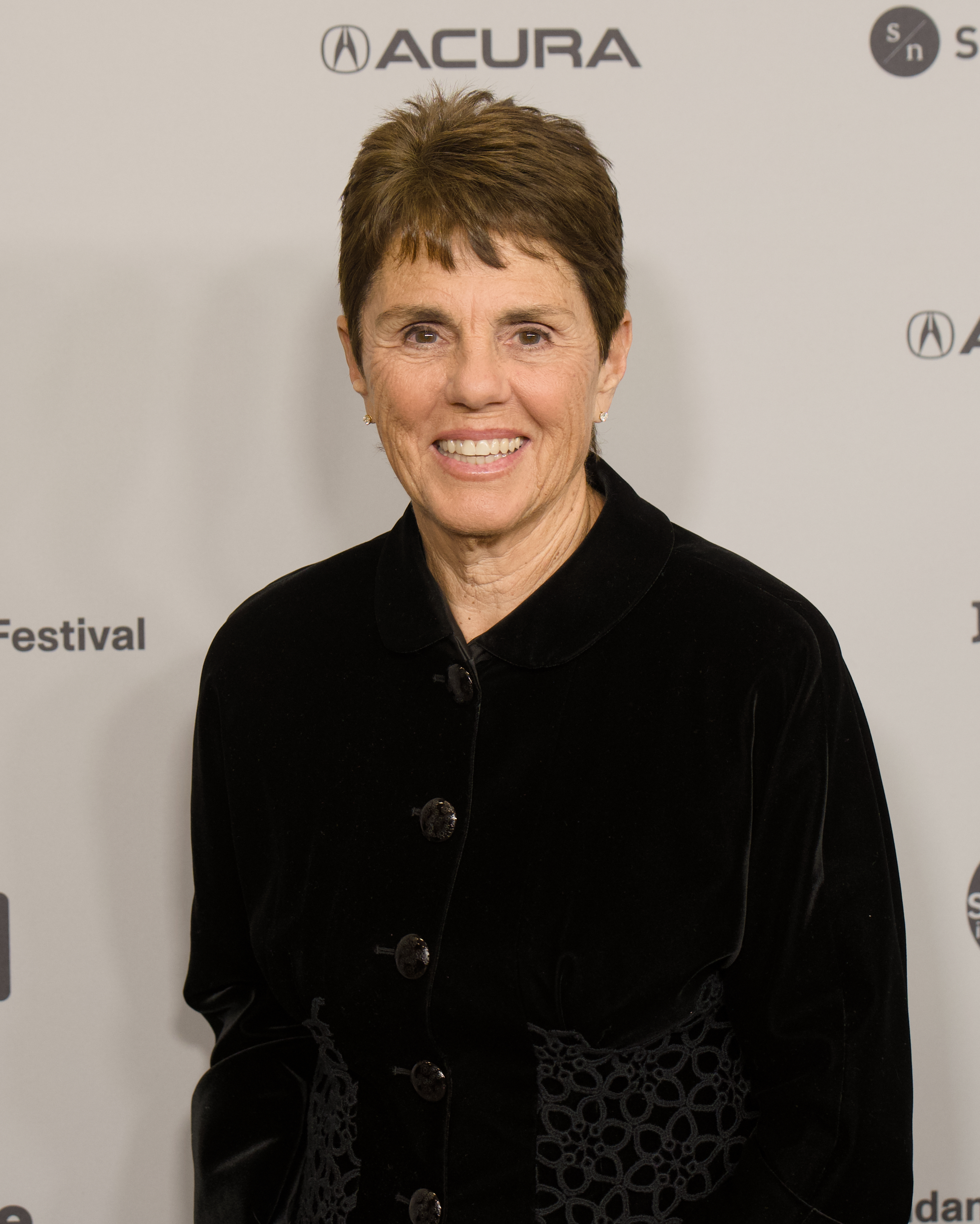
- Kloss in 2026
- Born: Ilana Sheryl Kloss; 22 March 1956 (age 70); Johannesburg, South Africa
- Spouse: Billie Jean King (m. 2018)
- Tennis career
- Turned pro: 1973
- Plays: Left-handed
- Prize money: US$ 38,384

Singles
- Highest ranking: No. 19 (1979)

Grand Slam singles results
- French Open: 2R (1976, 1979)
- Wimbledon: 3R (1975, 1976, 1978)
- US Open: 3R (1973, 1978)

Doubles
- Career record: 2–4
- Career titles: 19

Grand Slam doubles results
- Australian Open: QF (1983)
- French Open: SF (1976, 1979)
- Wimbledon: SF (1976)
- US Open: W (1976)

Grand Slam mixed doubles results
- French Open: W (1976)
Medal record
Maccabiah Games
Gold medal – first place	1973 Tel Aviv	Women's singles
Gold medal – first place	1973 Tel Aviv	Women's doubles
Gold medal – first place	1973 Tel Aviv	Mixed doubles
Silver medal – second place	1977 Tel Aviv	Mixed doubles

Ilana Sheryl Kloss (born 22 March 1956) is a South African former professional tennis player, tennis coach, and administrator. She was the World's No. 1 ranked doubles player in 1976, and World No. 19 in singles in 1979. She won the Wimbledon juniors singles title in 1972, the US Open juniors singles title in 1974, and the US Open Doubles and French Open Mixed Doubles titles in 1976. She won three gold medals at the 1973 Maccabiah Games in Israel. After her playing career, Kloss was the commissioner of World TeamTennis from 2001–2021.

== Tennis career ==
Before turning professional, Kloss won the juniors singles title at Wimbledon in 1972. She won the SA doubles title with Linky Boshoff in 1973, 1975, and 1977.

She also played in the Maccabiah Games in Israel, winning gold medals in the singles, women's doubles (with Helen Weiner defeating silver medalists Vicki Berner and Pam Gullish of Canada in the finals), and the mixed doubles in the 1973 Maccabiah Games. She also won a silver medal in mixed doubles in the 1977 Maccabiah Games, losing to Peter Rennert and Stacy Margolin.

In 1974, she won the US Open juniors singles title. She was the youngest No. 1 player in South African history. In 1973, she won the title in Cincinnati with Pat Walkden, defeating Evonne Goolagong and Janet Young in the final.

Kloss was ranked No. 1 in the world in doubles and No. 19 in singles in 1976. That year, she won doubles titles at the US Open, the Italian Open, the US Clay Courts, the German Open, the British Hard Courts Championship, and Hilton Head, as well as the mixed doubles title at the French Open. Linky Boshoff was her most frequent doubles partner. In 1977 she won the Canadian and German championships and the British clay court championship.

In 1999, Kloss won the US Open doubles and mixed doubles championship on the 35-and-over tour.

Kloss was inducted into the US National Jewish Sports Hall of Fame in 2006. She was inducted into the International Jewish Sports Hall of Fame in 2010.

=== Federation Cup ===
From 1973 until 1977, Kloss was a member of the South African team that competed in the Federation Cup. She compiled a 12–5 win–loss record.

=== World Team Tennis ===
Kloss joined the San Francisco Golden Gaters WTT team in 1974, and reached the WTT Finals with the team in 1975. She left the Golden Gaters prior to the 1976 season to team in order to fully participate in clay-court tournaments in Europe which conflicted with the WTT schedule. Kloss returned to the Golden Gaters for the 1978 season. In 1983, she coached the Chicago Fyre to a WTT Championship and was named Coach of the Year. In 1985, Kloss was a player and coach for the Miami Beach Breakers, and became vice-president of WTT in 1987 and executive director in 1991. Since 2001, she has been the chief executive officer and commissioner of World Team Tennis.

== Grand Slam tournament finals ==
=== Doubles: 1 (1 title) ===
Result	Year	Championship	Surface	Partner	Opponents	Score
Win	1976	US Open	Clay	(South Africa) Linky Boshoff	(Soviet Union) Olga Morozova (United Kingdom) Virginia Wade	6–1, 6–4

=== Mixed doubles: 1 (1 title) ===
Result	Year	Championship	Surface	Partner	Opponents	Score
Win	1976	French Open	Clay	(Australia) Kim Warwick	(South Africa) Linky Boshoff (Rhodesia) Colin Dowdeswell	5–7, 7–6, 6–2

== Post-tennis career ==
Kloss and her spouse Billie Jean King became minority owners of the Los Angeles Dodgers baseball team in September 2018 - so Kloss has three World Series championships to her credit (2020, 2024, and 2025). - and Angel City FC, a Los Angeles–based team that began play in the National Women's Soccer League in 2022.

Kloss, along with King, is a member of the Advisory Board of the Professional Women's Hockey League, which was formed in 2023. The MVP award for the PWHL playoffs was named the Ilana Kloss Playoff MVP award, first awarded to Minnesota forward, Taylor Heise.

== Personal life ==
Kloss was born in Johannesburg, South Africa.

On October 18, 2018, Kloss married American tennis player Billie Jean King. The ceremony was performed by former New York City Mayor David Dinkins. King and Kloss had been together for over 40 years as of 2021.

== See also ==
- List of select Jewish tennis players
