= Wightman Cup =

Former annual women's team tennis competition

- Status: Inactive
- Genre: Sports event
- Frequency: Annual
- Country: USA, UK
- Inaugurated: 1923
- Most recent: 1989

The Wightman Cup was an annual team tennis competition for women contested from 1923 through 1989 (except during World War II) between teams from the United States and Great Britain.

== History ==
U.S. player Hazel Hotchkiss Wightman wanted to generate international interest in women's tennis the way Davis Cup did for men's. In 1920, she donated a sterling silver vase to the United States Lawn Tennis Association (USLTA) as a prize for an international team competition. Initial efforts to involve teams from all over the world, and in particular France with Suzanne Lenglen, proved unsuccessful due to financial constraints.

The USLTA decided to invite Great Britain to challenge for the prize. Each match consisted of seven 'rubbers': five singles rubbers and two doubles. The top two players from each team would face each other in singles, with the matches then reversed. A third singles player from each team would play each other once. Two doubles teams would compete, but no player could play more than one doubles match. The cup always ended with the doubles match played between the two top pairs from each team.

The inaugural competition was played on 11 and 13 August 1923 in the newly constructed stadium at the West Side Tennis Club in Forest Hills, New York. The matches were played in even years in Britain and in odd years in the U.S. The U.S. matches were played at the West Side Tennis Club in Forest Hills, New York from the first year, 1923, through 1947, and the British matches were played at Wimbledon from the first year, 1924, through 1972.

The competition was a two-day event until 1967 when the U.S. event was held over three days in order to generate more revenue. A record 16,000 spectators attended that year. Until 1960, all editions of the Wightman Cup were played on grass courts: in later years also clay courts, cement and synthetic carpet were used. In 1978, the competition moved indoors to the Royal Albert Hall, was sponsored for the first time, and was called the Carnation Wightman Cup.

The BBC provided broadcast coverage of the competition from 1936 until 1987, although the final broadcast was limited to BBC Radio; the last televised competition in the UK was 1986.

The competition was continued through 1989, with the USTA and the Lawn Tennis Association jointly announcing on February 20, 1990, that the competition would be suspended indefinitely, citing low interest following years of American domination.

== Results ==
Total wins: United States 51–10 United Kingdom

Year	Location	Winner	Score
1923	Forest Hills, New York City	United States	7–0
1924	Wimbledon, London	United Kingdom	6–1
1925	Forest Hills, New York City	United Kingdom	4–3
1926	Wimbledon, London	United States	4–3
1927	Forest Hills, New York City	United States	5–2
1928	Wimbledon, London	United Kingdom	4–3
1929	Forest Hills, New York City	United States	4–3
1930	Wimbledon, London	United Kingdom	4–3
1931	Forest Hills, New York City	United States	5–2
1932	Wimbledon, London	United States	4–3
1933	Forest Hills, New York City	United States	4–3
1934	Wimbledon, London	United States	5–2
1935	Forest Hills, New York City	United States	4–3
1936	Wimbledon, London	United States	4–3
1937	Forest Hills, New York City	United States	6–1
1938	Wimbledon, London	United States	5–2
1939	Forest Hills, New York City	United States	5–2
1940–45	not held (World War II)		
1946	Wimbledon, London	United States	7–0
1947	Forest Hills, New York City	United States	7–0
1948	Wimbledon, London	United States	6–1
1949	Haverford, Pennsylvania	United States	7–0
1950	Wimbledon, London	United States	7–0
1951	Chestnut Hill, Massachusetts	United States	6–1
1952	Wimbledon, London	United States	7–0
1953	Rye, New York	United States	7–0
1954	Wimbledon, London	United States	6–0
1955	Rye, New York	United States	6–1
1956	Wimbledon, London	United States	5–2
1957	Edgeworth, Pennsylvania	United States	6–1
1958	Wimbledon, London	United Kingdom	4–3
1959	Edgeworth, Pennsylvania	United States	6–1
1960	Wimbledon, London	United Kingdom	4–3
1961	Chicago, Illinois	United States	6–1
1962	Wimbledon, London	United States	4–3
1963	Cleveland, Ohio	United States	6–1
1964	Wimbledon, London	United States	5–2
1965	Cleveland, Ohio	United States	5–2
1966	Wimbledon, London	United States	4–3
1967	Cleveland, Ohio	United States	6–1
1968	Wimbledon, London	United Kingdom	4–3
1969	Cleveland, Ohio	United States	5–2
1970	Wimbledon, London	United States	4–3
1971	Cleveland, Ohio	United States	4–3
1972	Wimbledon, London	United States	5–2
1973	Brookline, Massachusetts	United States	5–2
1974	Queensferry, Wales	United Kingdom	6–1
1975	Cleveland, Ohio	United Kingdom	5–2
1976	Crystal Palace, London	United States	5–2
1977	Oakland, California	United States	7–0
1978	Royal Albert Hall, London	United Kingdom	4–3
1979	West Palm Beach, Florida	United States	7–0
1980	Royal Albert Hall, London	United States	5–2
1981	Chicago	United States	7–0
1982	Royal Albert Hall, London	United States	6–1
1983	Williamsburg, Virginia	United States	6–1
1984	Royal Albert Hall, London	United States	5–2
1985	Williamsburg, Virginia	United States	7–0
1986	Royal Albert Hall, London	United States	7–0
1987	Williamsburg, Virginia	United States	5–2
1988	Royal Albert Hall, London	United States	7–0
1989	Williamsburg, Virginia	United States	7–0

== See also ==
- Billie Jean King Cup
