= 1926 Wightman Cup =

International women's tennis competition

Details
- Edition: 4th

Champion
- Winning nation: United States

The 1926 Wightman Cup was the fourth edition of the annual women's team tennis competition between the United States and Great Britain. It was held at the All England Lawn Tennis and Croquet Club in London in England.

Great Britain
3
All England Lawn Tennis and Croquet Club, London, England, United Kingdom
June 1926
Grass

United States
4

| | | | 1 | 2 | 3 |
|---|---|---|---|---|---|
| 1 | (United Kingdom) (United States) | Joan Fry; Elizabeth Ryan | 1; 6 | 3; 6 |
| 2 | (United Kingdom) (United States) | Kathleen McKane Godfree; Mary Browne | 6; 4 | 6; 2 |
| 3 | (United Kingdom) (United States) | Joan Fry; Mary Browne | 3; 6 | 6; 0 | 6; 4 |
| 4 | (United Kingdom) (United States) | Kathleen McKane Godfree; Elizabeth Ryan | 6; 1 | 5; 7 | 6; 4 |
| 5 | (United Kingdom) (United States) | Dorothy Shepherd-Barron; Marion Jessup | 1; 6 | 7; 5 | 4; 6 |
| 6 | (United Kingdom) (United States) | Dorothea Chambers / Dorothy Shepherd-Barron; Marion Jessup / Eleanor Goss | 4; 6 | 2; 6 |
| 7 | (United Kingdom) (United States) | Kathleen McKane Godfree / Evelyn Colyer; Mary Browne / Elizabeth Ryan | 6; 2 | 2; 6 | 4; 6 |

== See also ==
- 1926 Davis Cup
