= 1987 Wightman Cup =

International women's tennis competition

Details
- Edition: 59th

Champion
- Winning nation: United States

The 1987 Wightman Cup was the 59th edition of the annual women's team tennis competition between the United States and Great Britain. It was held at The College of William & Mary in Williamsburg, Virginia in the United States.

United States
5
The College of William & Mary, Williamsburg, Virginia, United States
1987
Hard (Indoors)

Great Britain
2

			1	2	3
1	(United States) (United Kingdom)	Zina Garrison; Anne Hobbs	7; 5	6; 2
2	(United States) (United Kingdom)	Lori McNeil; Sara Gomer	6; 2	6; 1
3	(United States) (United Kingdom)	Pam Shriver; Jo Durie	6; 1	7; 5
4	(United States) (United Kingdom)	Gigi Fernández / Robin White; Sara Gomer / Clare Wood	6; 4	6; 1
5	(United States) (United Kingdom)	Pam Shriver; Anne Hobbs	6; 4	6; 3
6	(United States) (United Kingdom)	Zina Garrison; Jo Durie	6; 7	3; 6
7	(United States) (United Kingdom)	Zina Garrison / Lori McNeil; Jo Durie / Anne Hobbs	6; 0	4; 6	5; 7
