= Joyce Williams (tennis) =

Scottish tennis player

- Country (sports): Great Britain
- Born: 22 July 1944 (age 81); Dundee, Scotland
- Turned pro: 1959 (amateur tour)
- Retired: 1979

Singles
- Career record: 335–190
- Career titles: 23

Grand Slam singles results
- French Open: 3R (1963)
- Wimbledon: 4R (1965, 1968)
- US Open: QF (1971)

Doubles
- Career record: 25–12

Grand Slam doubles results
- Wimbledon: SF (1972)
- US Open: SF (1968)

Grand Slam mixed doubles results
- Wimbledon: QF (1976)
- US Open: 3R (1969, 1971)

Team competitions
- Wightman Cup: F (1967, 1970, 1971, 1972)

Joyce Williams (née Barclay; born 22 July 1944) also known as Joyce Barclay is a retired tennis player from Scotland who was active in the 1960s and 1970s.

== Career ==
Her best singles performance at a Grand Slam tournament was reaching the quarterfinals at the 1971 US Open. She beat compatriot Winnie Shaw in the second round and eighth-seeded Julie Heldman in the third to reach the quarterfinal, which she lost in straight sets to second-seeded Rosie Casals. At Wimbledon she reached the fourth round in singles in 1965 and 1968 in which she was beaten in two sets by fourth-seeded Nancy Richey and eighth-seeded Lesley Bowrey respectively. At the French Championships, she reached the third round in 1963.

In the Grand Slam doubles competition, Williams made it to the semifinals on three occasions: at the U.S. Championships in 1967 with Winnie Shaw and in 1968 with Virginia Wade and at Wimbledon she reached the semifinals in 1972, partnering Shaw, in which they were defeated in three sets by eventual champions Billie-Jean King and Betty Stöve.

She played her first tournament in June 1959 at the Scottish Midlands Championships in Dundee, she then won her first title in July that year at the Carnoustie Open in Carnoustie. Williams won nine singles titles at the Scottish Championships and shared the title with Corinne Molesworth in 1972. In addition, she won the German Indoor Championships in 1968, defeating Helga Niessen in the final, and the Scandinavian Indoor Championships title in 1970. She won her final singles title at the Highland Championships at Pitlochry in 1975. In 1979 she played her final tournament at the Scottish National Championships in Edinburgh.

Williams competed in the Wightman Cup, a women's team tennis competition between the United States and Great Britain, in 1967, 1970, 1971 and 1972. She was also a member of the British Federation Cup team, playing a total of nine ties in 1969, 1970, 1972 and 1973 and compiling a 6–5 win–loss record.

During her career, Williams had wins over Margaret Court, Evonne Goolagong, Wade, Ann Haydon-Jones, and Judy Dalton.

After her retirement as a player in 1976, she became a tennis coach and BBC radio commentator.

== Personal life ==
She married BBC tennis correspondent Gerald Williams in 1964 but later divorced. In all, she married five times.
