= 1967 Wightman Cup =

International women's tennis competition

Details
- Edition: 39th

Champion
- Winning nation: United States

The 1967 Wightman Cup was the 39th edition of the annual women's team tennis competition between the United States and Great Britain. It was held outdoors on hard courts at the Harold T. Clark Stadium in Cleveland, Ohio in the United States.

United States
6
Harold T. Clark Stadium, Cleveland, Ohio, United States
1967
Hard (Outdoors)

Great Britain
1

			1	2	3
1	(United States) (United Kingdom)	Billie Jean King; Virginia Wade	6; 3	6; 2
2	(United States) (United Kingdom)	Nancy Richey; Ann Haydon Jones	6; 2	6; 2
3	(United States) (United Kingdom)	Rosemary Casals; Christine Truman	6; 3	5; 7	1; 6
4	(United States) (United Kingdom)	Nancy Richey; Virginia Wade	3; 6	8; 6	6; 2
5	(United States) (United Kingdom)	Billie Jean King; Ann Haydon Jones	6; 1	6; 2
6	(United States) (United Kingdom)	Rosemary Casals / Billie Jean King; Ann Haydon Jones / Virginia Wade	10; 8	6; 4
7	(United States) (United Kingdom)	Mary-Ann Eisel / Carole Caldwell Graebner; Winnie Shaw / Joyce Williams	8; 6	12; 10
