= 1988 Wightman Cup =

International women's tennis competition

Details
- Edition: 60th

Champion
- Winning nation: United States

The 1988 Wightman Cup (also known as the 1988 British Car Auctions Wightman Cup for sponsorship reasons) was the 60th edition of the annual women's team tennis competition between the United States and Great Britain. It was held at the Royal Albert Hall in London in England in the United Kingdom and was the final time the competition was staged in Britain.

Great Britain
0
Royal Albert Hall, London, England, United Kingdom
1988
Hard (Indoors)

United States
7

			1	2	3
1	(United Kingdom) (United States)	Jo Durie; Zina Garrison	2; 6	4; 6
2	(United Kingdom) (United States)	Monique Javer; Patty Fendick	2; 6	1; 6
3	(United Kingdom) (United States)	Sara Gomer; Lori McNeil	7; 6	4; 6	4; 6
4	(United Kingdom) (United States)	Sara Gomer / Julie Salmon; Lori McNeil / Betsy Nagelsen	3; 6	2; 6
5	(United Kingdom) (United States)	Clare Wood; Zina Garrison	3; 6	2; 6
6	(United Kingdom) (United States)	Jo Durie; Lori McNeil	1; 6	2; 6
7	(United Kingdom) (United States)	Jo Durie / Clare Wood; Gigi Fernández / Zina Garrison	1; 6	3; 6
