= 1970 Wightman Cup =

International women's tennis competition

Details
- Edition: 42nd

Champion
- Winning nation: United States

The 1970 Wightman Cup was the 42nd edition of the annual women's team tennis competition between the United States and Great Britain. It was held at the All England Lawn Tennis and Croquet Club in London in England in the United Kingdom.

Great Britain
3
All England Lawn Tennis and Croquet Club, London, England, United Kingdom
1970
Grass

United States
4

			1	2	3
1	(United Kingdom) (United States)	Virginia Wade; Billie Jean King	6; 8	4; 6
2	(United Kingdom) (United States)	Ann Haydon-Jones; Nancy Richey	6; 3	6; 3
3	(United Kingdom) (United States)	Joyce Williams; Julie Heldman	3; 6	2; 6
4	(United Kingdom) (United States)	Virginia Wade; Nancy Richey	6; 3	6; 2
5	(United Kingdom) (United States)	Ann Haydon-Jones; Billie Jean King	4; 6	2; 6
6	(United Kingdom) (United States)	Ann Haydon-Jones / Joyce Williams; Mary Ann Curtis / Julie Heldman	6; 3	6; 2
7	(United Kingdom) (United States)	Winnie Shaw / Virginia Wade; Billie Jean King / Jane Bartkowicz	5; 7	8; 6	2; 6
