= 1971 Wightman Cup =

International women's tennis competition

Details
- Edition: 43rd

Champion
- Winning nation: United States

The 1971 Wightman Cup was the 43rd edition of the annual women's team tennis competition between the United States and Great Britain. It was held at the Cleveland Arena in Cleveland, Ohio in the United States.

United States
4
Cleveland Arena, Cleveland, Ohio, United States
1971
Hard (Indoors)

Great Britain
3

			1	2	3
1	(United States) (United Kingdom)	Chris Evert; Winnie Shaw	6; 0	6; 4
2	(United States) (United Kingdom)	Julie Heldman; Virginia Wade	5; 7	5; 7
3	(United States) (United Kingdom)	Kristy Pigeon; Joyce Williams	5; 7	6; 3	4; 6
4	(United States) (United Kingdom)	Mary Ann Curtis / Valerie Ziegenfuss; Christine Truman Janes / Nell Truman	6; 1	6; 4
5	(United States) (United Kingdom)	Valerie Ziegenfuss; Winnie Shaw	6; 4	4; 6	6; 3
6	(United States) (United Kingdom)	Chris Evert; Virginia Wade	6; 1	6; 1
7	(United States) (United Kingdom)	Chris Evert / Carole Caldwell Graebner; Virginia Wade / Joyce Williams	8; 10	6; 4	1; 6
