= 1972 Wightman Cup =

International women's tennis competition

Details
- Edition: 44th

Champion
- Winning nation: United States

The 1972 Wightman Cup was the 44th edition of the annual women's team tennis competition between the United States and Great Britain. It was held at the All England Lawn Tennis and Croquet Club in London in England in the United Kingdom. A women's tennis pioneer, Edythe Ann (Sullivan) McGoldrick, led the U.S. Wightman Cup tennis team as captain in the cup's 50th year.

Great Britain
2
All England Lawn Tennis and Croquet Club, London, England, United Kingdom
1972
Grass

United States
5

			1	2	3
1	(United Kingdom) (United States)	Joyce Williams; Wendy Overton	6; 3	3; 6	6; 3
2	(United Kingdom) (United States)	Virginia Wade; Chris Evert	4; 6	4; 6
3	(United Kingdom) (United States)	Corinne Molesworth; Patti Hogan	8; 6	4; 6	2; 6
4	(United Kingdom) (United States)	Winnie Shaw / Nell Truman; Chris Evert / Patti Hogan	5; 7	4; 6
5	(United Kingdom) (United States)	Joyce Williams; Chris Evert	2; 6	3; 6
6	(United Kingdom) (United States)	Virginia Wade; Wendy Overton	8; 6	7; 5
7	(United Kingdom) (United States)	Virginia Wade / Joyce Williams; Wendy Overton / Valerie Ziegenfuss	3; 6	3; 6
