= 1965 Wightman Cup =

International women's tennis competition

Details
- Edition: 37th

Champion
- Winning nation: United States

The 1965 Wightman Cup was the 37th edition of the annual women's team tennis competition between the United States and Great Britain. It was held outdoors on clay at the 6,000-seat Harold T. Clark Stadium in Cleveland, Ohio, United States. This stadium had been purpose-built in 1964 to host the Challenge Round of the Davis Cup.

United States
5
Harold T. Clark Stadium, Cleveland, Ohio, United States
1965
Clay (Outdoors)

Great Britain
2

			1	2	3
1	(United States) (United Kingdom)	Billie Jean Moffitt; Ann Haydon Jones	2; 6	4; 6
2	(United States) (United Kingdom)	Nancy Richey; Elizabeth Starkie	6; 1	6; 0
3	(United States) (United Kingdom)	Carole Caldwell Graebner; Virginia Wade	3; 6	10; 8	6; 4
4	(United States) (United Kingdom)	Billie Jean Moffitt; Elizabeth Starkie	6; 3	6; 2
5	(United States) (United Kingdom)	Nancy Richey; Ann Haydon Jones	4; 6	7; 9
6	(United States) (United Kingdom)	Carole Caldwell Graebner / Nancy Richey; Elizabeth Starkie / Nell Truman	6; 1	6; 0
7	(United States) (United Kingdom)	Billie Jean Moffitt / Karen Hantze Susman; Ann Haydon Jones / Virginia Wade	6; 3	8; 6
