= 1978 Wightman Cup =

International women's tennis competition

Details
- Edition: 50th

Champion
- Winning nation: Great Britain

The 1978 Wightman Cup was the 50th edition of the annual women's team tennis competition between the United States and Great Britain. It was held at the Royal Albert Hall in London, England. It was the final time the British team won the competition before its discontinuation after the 1989 edition.

Great Britain
4
Royal Albert Hall, London, England, United Kingdom
1978
Hard (Indoors)

United States
3

			1	2	3
1	(United Kingdom) (United States)	Sue Barker; Chris Evert	2; 6	1; 6
2	(United Kingdom) (United States)	Michelle Tyler; Pam Shriver	5; 7	6; 3	6; 3
3	(United Kingdom) (United States)	Virginia Wade; Tracy Austin	3; 6	7; 5	6; 3
4	(United Kingdom) (United States)	Anne Hobbs / Sue Mappin; Tracy Austin / Billie Jean King	2; 6	6; 4	2; 6
5	(United Kingdom) (United States)	Virginia Wade; Chris Evert	0; 6	1; 6
6	(United Kingdom) (United States)	Sue Barker; Tracy Austin	6; 3	3; 6	6; 1
7	(United Kingdom) (United States)	Sue Barker / Virginia Wade; Chris Evert / Pam Shriver	6; 0	5; 7	6; 4
