= 1988 Northern California Open =

- Date: July 25 – July 31
- Edition: 3rd

Champions

Singles
- (United Kingdom) Sara Gomer

Doubles
- (South Africa) Lise Gregory / (United States) Ronni Reis
← 1987 ·	Northern California Open	· 1989 →

The 1988 Northern California Open was a tennis tournament played on outdoor hard courts in Aptos, California, in the United States and was part of Tier V of the 1988 WTA Tour. The tournament ran from July 25 through July 31, 1988.

== Winners ==
=== Women's singles ===
(United Kingdom) Sara Gomer defeated (United States) Robin White 6–4, 7–5

- It was Gomer's only title of the year and the 1st of her career.

=== Women's doubles ===
(South Africa) Lise Gregory / (United States) Ronni Reis defeated (United States) Patty Fendick / (Canada) Jill Hetherington 6–3, 6–4

- It was Gregory's only title of the year and the 2nd of her career. It was Reis' only title of the year and the 3rd of her career.
