= 1931 Wightman Cup =

International women's tennis competition

Details
- Edition: 9th

Champion
- Winning nation: United States

The 1931 Wightman Cup was the ninth edition of the annual women's team tennis competition between the United States and Great Britain. It was held at the West Side Tennis Club in Forest Hills, Queens in New York City in the United States.

United States
5
West Side Tennis Club, Forest Hills, New York City, United States
7–8 August 1931
Grass

Great Britain
2

			1	2	3
1	(United States) (United Kingdom)	Helen Wills Moody; Phyllis Mudford	6; 1	6; 4
2	(United States) (United Kingdom)	Helen Jacobs; Betty Nuthall	8; 6	6; 4
3	(United States) (United Kingdom)	Anna Harper; Dorothy Round	6; 3	4; 6	9; 7
4	(United States) (United Kingdom)	Helen Jacobs; Phyllis Mudford	6; 4	6; 2
5	(United States) (United Kingdom)	Helen Wills Moody; Betty Nuthall	6; 4	6; 2
6	(United States) (United Kingdom)	Sarah Palfrey / Hazel Hotchkiss Wightman; Phyllis Mudford / Dorothy Shepherd Barron	4; 6	8; 10
7	(United States) (United Kingdom)	Helen Wills Moody / Anna Harper; Betty Nuthall / Eileen Bennett Whittingstall	6; 8	7; 5	3; 6

== See also ==
- 1931 Davis Cup
