= 1983 Wightman Cup =

International women's tennis competition

Details
- Edition: 55th

Champion
- Winning nation: United States

The 1983 Wightman Cup was the 55th edition of the annual women's team tennis competition between the United States and Great Britain. It was held at The College of William & Mary in Williamsburg, Virginia in the United States. It was held from November 1 through November 6, 1983.

United States
6
The College of William & Mary, Williamsburg, Virginia, United States
1983
Hard (Indoors)

Great Britain
1

			1	2	3
1	(United States) (United Kingdom)	Martina Navratilova; Sue Barker	6; 2	6; 0
2	(United States) (United Kingdom)	Kathy Rinaldi; Virginia Wade	6; 2	6; 2
3	(United States) (United Kingdom)	Pam Shriver; Jo Durie	6; 3	6; 2
4	(United States) (United Kingdom)	Candy Reynolds / Paula Smith; Sue Barker / Virginia Wade	5; 7	6; 3	1; 6
5	(United States) (United Kingdom)	Pam Shriver; Sue Barker	6; 0	6; 1
6	(United States) (United Kingdom)	Martina Navratilova; Jo Durie	6; 3	6; 3
7	(United States) (United Kingdom)	Martina Navratilova / Pam Shriver; Annabel Croft / Jo Durie	6; 2	6; 1
