= 1980 Wightman Cup =

International women's tennis competition

Details
- Edition: 52nd

Champion
- Winning nation: United States

The 1980 Wightman Cup was the 52nd edition of the annual women's team tennis competition between the United States and Great Britain. It was held at the Royal Albert Hall in London in England in the United Kingdom. The cup was memorable for the last minute replacement of world no.1 Tracy Austin with Andrea Jaeger who had to fly from Japan to London at very short notice and arrived only hours before her first match, which she won. The BBC chose Chris Evert's victory over Virginia Wade as one of its "100 Greatest Sporting Moments" in recognition of Evert's final set recovery from being 1-5, 0-40 down on Wade's serve. Wade's victory would have squared the match at 3-3, whereas in fact, Evert's recovery secured the cup 4-2 with only the final doubles left to play.

Great Britain
2
Royal Albert Hall, London, England, United Kingdom
1980
Hard (Indoors)

United States
5

			1	2	3
1	(United Kingdom) (United States)	Sue Barker; Chris Evert-Lloyd	1; 6	2; 6
2	(United Kingdom) (United States)	Anne Hobbs; Kathy Jordan	4; 6	6; 4	6; 1
3	(United Kingdom) (United States)	Virginia Wade; Andrea Jaeger	6; 3	3; 6	2; 6
4	(United Kingdom) (United States)	Glynis Coles / Anne Hobbs; Rosemary Casals / Chris Evert-Lloyd	3; 6	3; 6
5	(United Kingdom) (United States)	Sue Barker; Andrea Jaeger	5; 7	6; 3	6; 3
6	(United Kingdom) (United States)	Virginia Wade; Chris Evert-Lloyd	5; 7	6; 3	5; 7
7	(United Kingdom) (United States)	Sue Barker / Virginia Wade; Kathy Jordan / Anne Smith	4; 6	5; 7
