= 1982 Wightman Cup =

International women's tennis competition

Details
- Edition: 54th

Champion
- Winning nation: United States

The 1982 Wightman Cup was the 54th edition of the annual women's team tennis competition between the United States and Great Britain. It was held at the Royal Albert Hall in London in England in the United Kingdom.

Great Britain
1
Royal Albert Hall, London, England, United Kingdom
1982
Hard (Indoors)

United States
6

			1	2	3
1	(United Kingdom) (United States)	Sue Barker; Barbara Potter	2; 6	2; 6
2	(United Kingdom) (United States)	Virginia Wade; Anne Smith	6; 3	5; 7	3; 6
3	(United Kingdom) (United States)	Jo Durie; Chris Evert-Lloyd	2; 6	2; 6
4	(United Kingdom) (United States)	Jo Durie / Anne Hobbs; Rosemary Casals / Anne Smith	6; 3	2; 6	6; 2
5	(United Kingdom) (United States)	Jo Durie; Barbara Potter	7; 5	6; 7	2; 6
6	(United Kingdom) (United States)	Sue Barker; Chris Evert-Lloyd	4; 6	3; 6
7	(United Kingdom) (United States)	Sue Barker / Virginia Wade; Barbara Potter / Sharon Walsh	6; 2	4; 6	4; 6
