= 1964 Wightman Cup =

International women's tennis competition

Details
- Edition: 36th

Champion
- Winning nation: United States

The 1964 Wightman Cup was the 36th edition of the annual women's team tennis competition between the United States and Great Britain. It was held at the All England Lawn Tennis and Croquet Club in London in England in the United Kingdom.

Great Britain
2
All England Lawn Tennis and Croquet Club, London, England, United Kingdom
1964
Grass

United States
5

			1	2	3
1	(United Kingdom) (United States)	Deidre Catt; Nancy Richey	6; 4	4; 6	5; 7
2	(United Kingdom) (United States)	Ann Haydon-Jones; Billie Jean Moffitt	6; 4	2; 6	3; 6
3	(United Kingdom) (United States)	Elizabeth Starkie; Carole Caldwell	4; 6	6; 1	3; 6
4	(United Kingdom) (United States)	Ann Haydon-Jones; Nancy Richey	5; 7	9; 11
5	(United Kingdom) (United States)	Deidre Catt; Billie Jean Moffitt	3; 6	6; 4	3; 6
6	(United Kingdom) (United States)	Deidre Catt / Ann Haydon-Jones; Carole Caldwell / Billie Jean Moffitt	6; 3	4; 6	6; 0
7	(United Kingdom) (United States)	Angela Mortimer / Elizabeth Starkie; Donna Floyd Fales / Nancy Richey	2; 6	6; 3	6; 4
