= 1976 Wightman Cup =

International women's tennis competition

1977 Wightman Cup
Details
- Edition: 48th

Champion
- Winning nation: United States

The 1976 Wightman Cup was the 48th edition of the annual women's team tennis competition between the United States and Great Britain. It was held at the Crystal Palace National Sports Centre in London in England in the United Kingdom.

Great Britain
2
Crystal Palace National Sports Centre, London, England, United Kingdom
1976
Hard (Indoors)

United States
5

			1	2	3
1	(United Kingdom) (United States)	Virginia Wade; Chris Evert	2; 6	6; 3	3; 6
2	(United Kingdom) (United States)	Sue Barker; Rosemary Casals	1; 6	6; 3	6; 2
3	(United Kingdom) (United States)	Glynis Coles; Terry Holladay	6; 3	1; 6	4; 6
4	(United Kingdom) (United States)	Sue Barker / Virginia Wade; Rosemary Casals / Chris Evert	0; 6	7; 5	1; 6
5	(United Kingdom) (United States)	Virginia Wade; Rosemary Casals	3; 6	9; 7		retired
6	(United Kingdom) (United States)	Sue Barker; Chris Evert	6; 2	2; 6	2; 6
7	(United Kingdom) (United States)	Lesley Charles / Sue Mappin; Mona Guerrant / Ann Kiyomura	2; 6	2; 6
