= Corinne Molesworth =

British tennis player

- Full name: Corinne Molesworth-Boyd
- Country (sports): United Kingdom
- Born: 18 June 1949 (age 76); Brixham, England

Singles
- Career record: 267-227 (54.0%)
- Career titles: 17

Grand Slam singles results
- French Open: QF (1972)
- Wimbledon: 3R (1976)
- US Open: 1R (1970, 1971, 1972)

Doubles

Grand Slam doubles results
- French Open: 1R (1972)
- Wimbledon: 2R (1969, 1971, 1973)
- US Open: 2R (1970)

Grand Slam mixed doubles results
- Wimbledon: 2R (1973, 1974, 1977)

Team competitions
- Wightman Cup: F (1972)

Corinne Molesworth (born 18 June 1949) is a former tennis player from the United Kingdom. She was active from 1963 to 1979 and contested 28 career singles finals and won 17 titles.

In 1967 she became the junior singles champion at the French Championships.

Her best performance at a Grand Slam tournament was reaching the quarterfinal of the singles event at the 1972 French Open. As a qualifier she defeated Nathalie Fuchs, Sonja Pachta, eighth-seeded Linda Tuero and Judy Tegart Dalton to reach the quarterfinal, which she lost in straight sets to first-seeded Evonne Goolagong. At the Wimbledon Championships she reached the third round in the singles event in 1976 in which she was defeated in two sets by second-seeded Evonne Goolagong-Cawley. Her three participations in the singles event of the US Open (1970, 1971, 1972) ended in the first round.

She competed in the 1972 Wightman Cup, a team tennis competition for women between the United States and Great Britain, losing her match against Patti Hogan in three sets. That year she shared the singles title of the Scottish Championships with Joyce Williams.

Partnering Naoko Satō she was runner-up in the doubles event of the 1976 Chichester Tennis Tournament.

Molesworth was coached by Arthur Roberts.

== Career finals ==
=== Doubles (1 runners-up) ===
Outcome	No.	Date	Tournament	Surface	Partner	Opponents	Score
Runner-up	1.	1976	Chichester Tennis Tournament, UK	Grass	(Japan) Naoko Satō	(South Africa) Marise Kruger (South Africa) Elizabeth Vlotman	2–6, 1–6
