= 1963 Wightman Cup =

International women's tennis competition

Details
- Edition: 35th

Champion
- Winning nation: United States

The 1963 Wightman Cup was the 35th edition of the annual women's team tennis competition between the United States and Great Britain. It was held at the Cleveland Skating Club in Cleveland, Ohio in the United States.

== Notable stories ==
Most games in a Wightman Cup set

In the second match Billie Jean Moffitt and Christine Truman consumed 36 games in deciding the second set, which Moffitt won 19–17 to conclude the match.

Second most games in a Wightman Cup set

In the third match Nancy Richey and Deidre Catt consumed 26 games in a first set eventually won 14–12 by Richey, who went on to win the match.

United States
6
Cleveland Skating Club, Cleveland, Ohio, United States
1963
Clay (Outdoors)

Great Britain
1

			1	2	3
1	(United States) (United Kingdom)	Darlene Hard; Ann Haydon-Jones	1; 6	6; 0	6; 8
2	(United States) (United Kingdom)	Billie Jean Moffitt; Christine Truman	6; 4	19; 17
3	(United States) (United Kingdom)	Nancy Richey; Deidre Catt	14; 12	6; 3
4	(United States) (United Kingdom)	Darlene Hard; Christine Truman	6; 3	6; 0
5	(United States) (United Kingdom)	Billie Jean Moffitt; Ann Haydon-Jones	6; 4	4; 6	6; 3
6	(United States) (United Kingdom)	Darlene Hard / Billie Jean Moffitt; Ann Haydon-Jones / Christine Truman	4; 6	7; 5	6; 2
7	(United States) (United Kingdom)	Donna Floyd Fales / Nancy Richey; Deidre Catt / Elizabeth Starkie	6; 4	6; 8	6; 2
