= 1939 Wightman Cup =

International women's tennis competition

Details
- Edition: 17th

Champion
- Winning nation: United States

The 1939 Wightman Cup was the 17th edition of the annual women's team tennis competition between the United States and Great Britain. It was held at the West Side Tennis Club in Forest Hills, Queens, in New York City in the United States.

United States
5
West Side Tennis Club, Forest Hills, New York City, United States
August 1939
Grass

Great Britain
2

			1	2	3
1	(United States) (United Kingdom)	Alice Marble; Mary Hardwick	6; 3	6; 4
2	(United States) (United Kingdom)	Helen Jacobs; Kay Stammers	2; 6	6; 1	3; 6
3	(United States) (United Kingdom)	Sarah Palfrey Fabyan; Valerie Scott	3; 6	4; 6
4	(United States) (United Kingdom)	Alice Marble; Kay Stammers	3; 6	6; 3	6; 4
5	(United States) (United Kingdom)	Helen Jacobs; Mary Hardwick	6; 2	6; 2
6	(United States) (United Kingdom)	Dorothy Bundy / Mary Arnold; Betty Nuthall / Nina Brown	6; 3	6; 1
7	(United States) (United Kingdom)	Alice Marble / Sarah Palfrey Fabyan; Kay Stammers / Freda James Hammersley	7; 5	6; 2
