= 1986 Wightman Cup =

International women's tennis competition

Details
- Edition: 58th

Champion
- Winning nation: United States

The 1986 Wightman Cup was the 58th edition of the annual women's team tennis competition between the United States and Great Britain. It was held at the Royal Albert Hall in London in England in the United Kingdom.

Great Britain
0
Royal Albert Hall, London, England, United Kingdom
1986
Hard (Indoors)

United States
7

			1	2	3
1	(United Kingdom) (United States)	Sara Gomer; Kathy Rinaldi	3; 6	6; 7
2	(United Kingdom) (United States)	Annabel Croft; Stephanie Rehe	3; 6	1; 6
3	(United Kingdom) (United States)	Jo Durie; Bonnie Gadusek	2; 6	4; 6
4	(United Kingdom) (United States)	Annabel Croft / Sara Gomer; Kathy Rinaldi / Bonnie Gadusek	3; 6	7; 5	3; 6
5	(United Kingdom) (United States)	Anne Hobbs; Bonnie Gadusek	6; 2	4; 6	4; 6
6	(United Kingdom) (United States)	Jo Durie; Kathy Rinaldi	4; 6	2; 6
7	(United Kingdom) (United States)	Jo Durie / Anne Hobbs; Elise Burgin / Anne White	6; 7	4; 6
