= 1959 Wightman Cup =

International women's tennis competition

Details
- Edition: 31st

Champion
- Winning nation: United States

The 1959 Wightman Cup was the 31st edition of the annual women's team tennis competition between the United States and Great Britain. It was held in Edgeworth, Pennsylvania in the United States.

United States
4
Edgeworth, Pennsylvania, United States
1959
Grass

Great Britain
3

			1	2	3
1	(United States) (United Kingdom)	Beverly Baker Fleitz; Angela Mortimer	6; 2	6; 1
2	(United States) (United Kingdom)	Darlene Hard; Christine Truman	4; 6	6; 2	3; 6
3	(United States) (United Kingdom)	Darlene Hard; Angela Mortimer	6; 3	6; 8	6; 4
4	(United States) (United Kingdom)	Beverly Baker Fleitz; Christine Truman	6; 4	6; 4
5	(United States) (United Kingdom)	Sally Moore; Ann Haydon	1; 6	1; 6
6	(United States) (United Kingdom)	Jeanne Arth / Darlene Hard; Shirley Brasher / Christine Truman	9; 7	9; 7
7	(United States) (United Kingdom)	Janet Hopps / Sally Moore; Ann Haydon / Angela Mortimer	2; 6	4; 6
