= 1935 Wightman Cup =

International women's tennis competition

Details
- Edition: 13th

Champion
- Winning nation: United States

The 1935 Wightman Cup was the 13th edition of the annual women's team tennis competition between the United States and Great Britain. It was held at the West Side Tennis Club in Forest Hills, Queens in New York City in the United States.

United States
4
West Side Tennis Club, Forest Hills, New York City, United States
August 1935
Grass

Great Britain
3

			1	2	3
1	(United States) (United Kingdom)	Helen Jacobs; Kay Stammers	7; 5	1; 6	7; 9
2	(United States) (United Kingdom)	Ethel Arnold; Dorothy Round	0; 6	3; 6
3	(United States) (United Kingdom)	Sarah Palfrey; Phyllis Mudford	6; 0	6; 3
4	(United States) (United Kingdom)	Helen Jacobs; Dorothy Round	6; 3	6; 2
5	(United States) (United Kingdom)	Ethel Arnold; Kay Stammers	6; 2	1; 6	6; 3
6	(United States) (United Kingdom)	Helen Jacobs / Sarah Palfrey; Kay Stammers / Freda James	6; 3	6; 2
7	(United States) (United Kingdom)	Dorothy Andrus / Carolin Babcock; Nancy Lyle / Evelyn Dearman	6; 3	4; 6	1; 6

== See also ==
- 1935 Davis Cup
