= 1985 Wightman Cup =

1985 women's team tennis competition

Details
- Edition: 57th

Champion
- Winning nation: United States

The 1985 Wightman Cup was the 57th edition of the annual women's team tennis competition between the United States and Great Britain. It was held at The College of William & Mary in Williamsburg, Virginia in the United States.

United States
7
The College of William & Mary, Williamsburg, Virginia, United States
1985
Hard (Indoors)

Great Britain
0

			1	2	3
1	(United States) (United Kingdom)	Chris Evert-Lloyd; Jo Durie	6; 2	6; 3
2	(United States) (United Kingdom)	Kathy Rinaldi; Anne Hobbs	7; 5	7; 5
3	(United States) (United Kingdom)	Pam Shriver; Annabel Croft	6; 0	6; 0
4	(United States) (United Kingdom)	Betsy Nagelsen / Anne White; Annabel Croft / Virginia Wade	6; 4	6; 1
5	(United States) (United Kingdom)	Pam Shriver; Jo Durie	6; 4	6; 4
6	(United States) (United Kingdom)	Chris Evert-Lloyd; Annabel Croft	6; 3	6; 0
7	(United States) (United Kingdom)	Chris Evert-Lloyd / Pam Shriver; Jo Durie / Anne Hobbs	6; 3	6; 7	6; 2
