= 1973 Wightman Cup =

International women's tennis competition

Details
- Edition: 45th

Champion
- Winning nation: United States

The 1973 Wightman Cup was the 45th edition of the annual women's team tennis competition between the United States and Great Britain. It was held at Longwood Cricket Club in Chestnut Hill, Massachusetts in the United States.

United States
5
Longwood Cricket Club, Chestnut Hill, Massachusetts, United States
1973
Grass

Great Britain
2

			1	2	3
1	(United States) (United Kingdom)	Chris Evert; Virginia Wade	6; 4	6; 2
2	(United States) (United Kingdom)	Patti Hogan; Veronica Burton	6; 4	6; 3
3	(United States) (United Kingdom)	Linda Tuero; Glynis Coles	7; 5	6; 2
4	(United States) (United Kingdom)	Chris Evert / Marita Redondo; Glynis Coles / Virginia Wade	3; 6	4; 6
5	(United States) (United Kingdom)	Chris Evert; Veronica Burton	6; 3	6; 0
6	(United States) (United Kingdom)	Patti Hogan; Virginia Wade	2; 6	2; 6
7	(United States) (United Kingdom)	Jeanne Evert / Patti Hogan; Lindsey Beaven / Lesley Charles	6; 3	4; 6	8; 6
