= 1937 Wightman Cup =

International women's tennis competition

Details
- Edition: 15th

Champion
- Winning nation: United States

The 1937 Wightman Cup was the 15th edition of the annual women's team tennis competition between the United States and Great Britain. It was held at the West Side Tennis Club in Forest Hills, Queens in New York City in the United States.

United States
6
West Side Tennis Club, Forest Hills, New York City, United States
August 1937
Grass

Great Britain
1

| | | | 1 | 2 | 3 |
|---|---|---|---|---|---|
| 1 | (United States) (United Kingdom) | Alice Marble; Mary Hardwick | 4; 6 | 6; 2 | 6; 4 |
| 2 | (United States) (United Kingdom) | Helen Jacobs; Kay Stammers | 6; 1 | 4; 6 | 6; 4 |
| 3 | (United States) (United Kingdom) | Helen Jacobs; Mary Hardwick | 2; 6 | 6; 4 | 6; 2 |
| 4 | (United States) (United Kingdom) | Alice Marble; Kay Stammers | 6; 3 | 6; 1 |
| 5 | (United States) (United Kingdom) | Sarah Palfrey Fabyan; Margot Lumb | 6; 3 | 6; 1 |
| 6 | (United States) (United Kingdom) | Alice Marble / Sarah Palfrey Fabyan; Evelyn Dearman / Joan Ingram | 6; 3 | 6; 2 |
| 7 | (United States) (United Kingdom) | Marjorie Gladman Van Ryn / Dorothy Bundy; Kay Stammers / Freda James | 3; 6 | 8; 10 |
