= 1966 Wightman Cup =

International women's tennis competition

Details
- Edition: 38th

Champion
- Winning nation: United States

The 1966 Wightman Cup was the 38th edition of the annual women's team tennis competition between the United States and Great Britain. It was held at the All England Lawn Tennis and Croquet Club in London in England in the United Kingdom.

Great Britain
3
All England Lawn Tennis and Croquet Club, London, England, United Kingdom
1966
Grass

United States
4

			1	2	3
1	(United Kingdom) (United States)	Ann Haydon-Jones; Nancy Richey	2; 6	6; 4	6; 3
2	(United Kingdom) (United States)	Virginia Wade; Billie Jean King	2; 6	3; 6
3	(United Kingdom) (United States)	Winnie Shaw; Mary-Ann Eisel	6; 3	6; 3
4	(United Kingdom) (United States)	Virginia Wade; Nancy Richey	6; 2	2; 6	5; 7
5	(United Kingdom) (United States)	Ann Haydon-Jones; Billie Jean King	7; 5	2; 6	3; 6
6	(United Kingdom) (United States)	Ann Haydon-Jones / Virginia Wade; Jane Albert / Billie Jean King	7; 5	6; 2
7	(United Kingdom) (United States)	Rita Bentley / Elizabeth Starkie; Mary-Ann Eisel / Nancy Richey	1; 6	2; 6
