= Margot Lumb =

English squash and tennis player

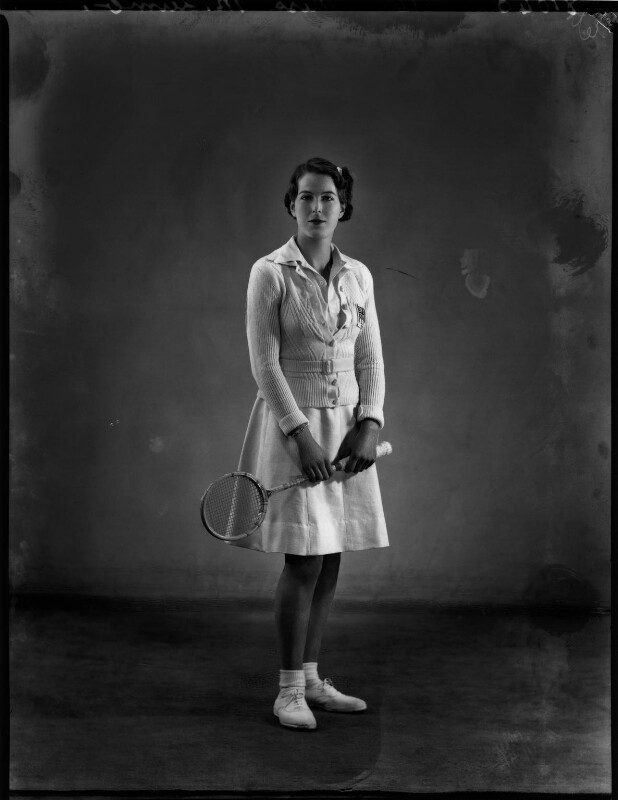
- Margot Lumb in 1936
- Born: 1 July 1912; London, England
- Died: 3 January 1998 (aged 85)
- Spouse: W. H. L. Gordon (m. 1944)
- Tennis career
- Country (sports): United Kingdom
- Plays: Left-handed

Grand Slam doubles results
- Wimbledon: Quarterfinalist (1939)

Team competitions
- Wightman Cup: Runner-up (1937, 1938)

Margot Lumb (1 July 1912 - 3 January 1998) was an English squash and tennis player.

== Biography ==
Margarita Evelyn Lumb was born in London in 1912 to Charles Fletcher Lumb and Margarita Johnson. Her father was a businessman and inventor; her mother was from Cuba. She was one of five children.

As a squash player she won the British Open for five consecutive seasons (1935 to 1939). She won all five finals in straight sets. She was also the runner-up at the championship in 1934, losing to Susan Noel/

Lumb also won the United States Hardball National Championship in 1935.

As a tennis player, Lumb participated in the British Wightman Cup team in 1937 and 1938. She was a finalist in the 1937 All England Plate tournament, a tennis competition held at the Wimbledon Championships which consisted of players who were defeated in the first or second rounds of the singles competition. She lost the final in straight sets to Freda James. Lumb was the runner-up at the 1938 German Championships singles event, losing the final in straight sets to defending champion Hilde Sperling.

Margot also competed in the main draw of the women's doubles at Wimbledon with her sister Berenice (Bernice) from 1937 to 1939, reaching the quarterfinals in 1939.

Following her marriage in 1944 to W.H.L. (Bill) Gordon, Margot Lumb continued playing both squash and tennis using her married name: either Margot Gordon or Mrs W.H. Gordon.
