= 1969 Wightman Cup =

Women's tennis competition in Ohio

Details
- Edition: 41st

Champion
- Winning nation: United States

The 1969 Wightman Cup was the 41st edition of the yearly women's team tennis competition between the United States and Great Britain. It was held at the Cleveland Arena in Cleveland, Ohio in the United States.

United States
5
Cleveland Arena, Cleveland, Ohio, United States
1969
Hard (Indoors)

Great Britain
2

			1	2	3
1	(United States) (United Kingdom)	Julie Heldman; Virginia Wade	3; 6	6; 1	8; 6
2	(United States) (United Kingdom)	Nancy Richey; Winnie Shaw	8; 6	6; 2
3	(United States) (United Kingdom)	Jane Bartkowicz; Christine Truman Janes	8; 6	6; 0
4	(United States) (United Kingdom)	Nancy Richey; Virginia Wade	3; 6	6; 2	4; 6
5	(United States) (United Kingdom)	Julie Heldman; Winnie Shaw	6; 3	6; 4
6	(United States) (United Kingdom)	Mary-Ann Curtis / Valerie Ziegenfuss; Christine Truman Janes / Nell Truman	1; 6	6; 3	4; 6
7	(United States) (United Kingdom)	Jane Bartkowicz / Julie Heldman; Winnie Shaw / Virginia Wade	6; 4	6; 2
