= 1981 Wightman Cup =

International women's tennis competition

Details
- Edition: 53rd

Champion
- Winning nation: United States

The 1981 Wightman Cup was the 53rd edition of the annual women's team tennis competition between the United States and Great Britain. It was held at the International Amphitheatre in Chicago, Illinois in the United States.

United States
7
International Amphitheatre, Chicago, Illinois, United States
1981
Hard (Indoors)

Great Britain
0

			1	2	3
1	(United States) (United Kingdom)	Tracy Austin; Sue Barker	7; 5	6; 3
2	(United States) (United Kingdom)	Andrea Jaeger; Anne Hobbs	6; 0	6; 0
3	(United States) (United Kingdom)	Chris Evert-Lloyd; Virginia Wade	6; 1	6; 3
4	(United States) (United Kingdom)	Andrea Jaeger / Pam Shriver; Jo Durie / Anne Hobbs	6; 1	6; 3
5	(United States) (United Kingdom)	Tracy Austin; Virginia Wade	6; 3	6; 1
6	(United States) (United Kingdom)	Chris Evert-Lloyd; Sue Barker	6; 3	6; 0
7	(United States) (United Kingdom)	Rosemary Casals / Chris Evert-Lloyd; Glynis Coles / Virginia Wade	6; 3	6; 3
