= 1984 Wightman Cup =

International women's tennis competition

Details
- Edition: 56th

Champion
- Winning nation: United States

The 1984 Nabisco Wightman Cup was the 56th edition of the annual women's team tennis competition between the United States and Great Britain. It was held at the Royal Albert Hall in London in England in the United Kingdom.

Great Britain
2
Royal Albert Hall, London, England, United Kingdom
1–3 November 1984
Hard (Indoors)

United States
5

			1	2	3
1	(United Kingdom) (United States)	Anne Hobbs; Chris Evert-Lloyd	2; 6	3; 6
2	(United Kingdom) (United States)	Annabel Croft; Alycia Moulton	6; 1	5; 7	6; 4
3	(United Kingdom) (United States)	Jo Durie; Barbara Potter	6; 3	7; 6
4	(United Kingdom) (United States)	Amanda Brown / Virginia Wade; Chris Evert-Lloyd / Alycia Moulton	2; 6	2; 6
5	(United Kingdom) (United States)	Anne Hobbs; Barbara Potter	1; 6	3; 6
6	(United Kingdom) (United States)	Jo Durie; Chris Evert-Lloyd	6; 7	1; 6
7	(United Kingdom) (United States)	Jo Durie / Anne Hobbs; Barbara Potter / Sharon Walsh	6; 7	6; 4	7; 9
