= 1961 Wightman Cup =

International women's tennis competition

1964 Wightman Cup
Details
- Edition: 33rd

Champion
- Winning nation: United States

The 1961 Wightman Cup was the 33rd edition of the annual women's team tennis competition between the United States and Great Britain. It was held at the Saddle & Cycle Club in Chicago, Illinois in the United States.

United States
6
Saddle & Cycle Club, Chicago, Illinois, United States
1961
Green Clay

Great Britain
1

			1	2	3
1	(United States) (United Kingdom)	Karen Hantze; Christine Truman	7; 9	6; 1	6; 1
2	(United States) (United Kingdom)	Billie Jean Moffitt; Ann Haydon	6; 4	6; 4
3	(United States) (United Kingdom)	Karen Hantze; Ann Haydon	6; 1	6; 4
4	(United States) (United Kingdom)	Billie Jean Moffitt; Christine Truman	3; 6	2; 6
5	(United States) (United Kingdom)	Justina Bricka; Angela Mortimer	10; 8	4; 6	6; 3
6	(United States) (United Kingdom)	Karen Hantze / Billie Jean Moffitt; Deidre Catt / Christine Truman	7; 5	6; 2
7	(United States) (United Kingdom)	Margaret Osborne duPont / Margaret Varner; Ann Haydon / Angela Mortimer				w/o
