= Darlene Hard =

American tennis player (1936–2021)

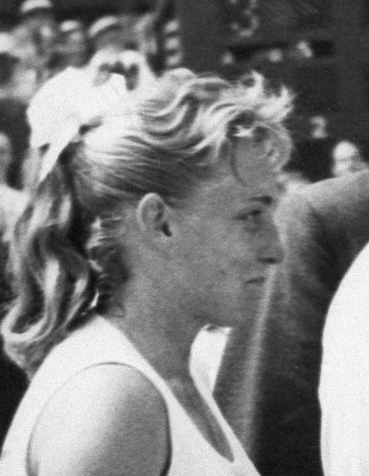
- Hard at the 1957 Wimbledon Singles Championships.
- Full name: Darlene Ruth Hard
- Country (sports): United States
- Born: January 6, 1936 Los Angeles, California, U.S.
- Died: December 2, 2021 (aged 85) Los Angeles, California, U.S.
- Turned pro: 1964 (amateur from 1953)
- Retired: 1970
- Plays: Right-handed
- Int. Tennis HoF: 1973 (member page)

Singles
- Career record: 498-156 (76.1%)
- Career titles: 43
- Highest ranking: No. 2 (1957)

Grand Slam singles results
- Australian Open: QF (1962)
- French Open: W (1960)
- Wimbledon: F (1957, 1959)
- US Open: W (1960, 1961)

Grand Slam doubles results
- Australian Open: F (1962)
- French Open: W (1955, 1957, 1960)
- Wimbledon: W (1957, 1959, 1960, 1963)
- US Open: W (1958, 1959, 1960, 1961, 1962, 1969)

Grand Slam mixed doubles results
- Australian Open: F (1962)
- French Open: W (1955, 1961)
- Wimbledon: W (1957, 1959, 1960)
- US Open: F (1956, 1957, 1961)

Team competitions
- Wightman Cup: W (1957, 1959, 1962, 1963)
Medal record
Pan American Games
Gold medal – first place	1963 São Paulo	Doubles
Bronze medal – third place	1963 São Paulo	Singles

Darlene Ruth Hard (January 6, 1936 – December 2, 2021) was an American professional tennis player, known for her aggressive volleying ability and strong serves. She captured singles titles at the French Championships in 1960 and the U.S. Championships in 1960 and 1961. With eight different partners, she won a total of 13 women's doubles titles and, with another three partners, she won 5 mixed doubles titles in Grand Slam tournaments, and was the finest doubles player of her generation. Her last doubles title, at the age of 33 at the 1969 US Open, came six years after she had retired from serious competition to become a tennis instructor. She also played the US Open singles tournament in 1969, losing in the second round to Françoise Dürr.

According to Lance Tingay, Hard was ranked among the top 10 in the world from 1957 through 1963, reaching a career high of No. 2 in those rankings in 1957, 1960, and 1961. The Miami Herald ranked her No. 1 for the 1961 season. In 1957, she made her first Wimbledon finals appearance, losing to Althea Gibson.

Hard was included in the year-end top-10 rankings issued by the United States Lawn Tennis Association from 1954 through 1963. Charles Friedman wrote in The New York Times that year that "as a doubles player, she has no peer." She was the top-ranked U.S. player from 1960 through 1963. With her younger doubles partner Billie Jean King, she helped the US team to victory in the 1963 Federation Cup. Hard was enshrined in the International Tennis Hall of Fame in 1973.

== College career ==
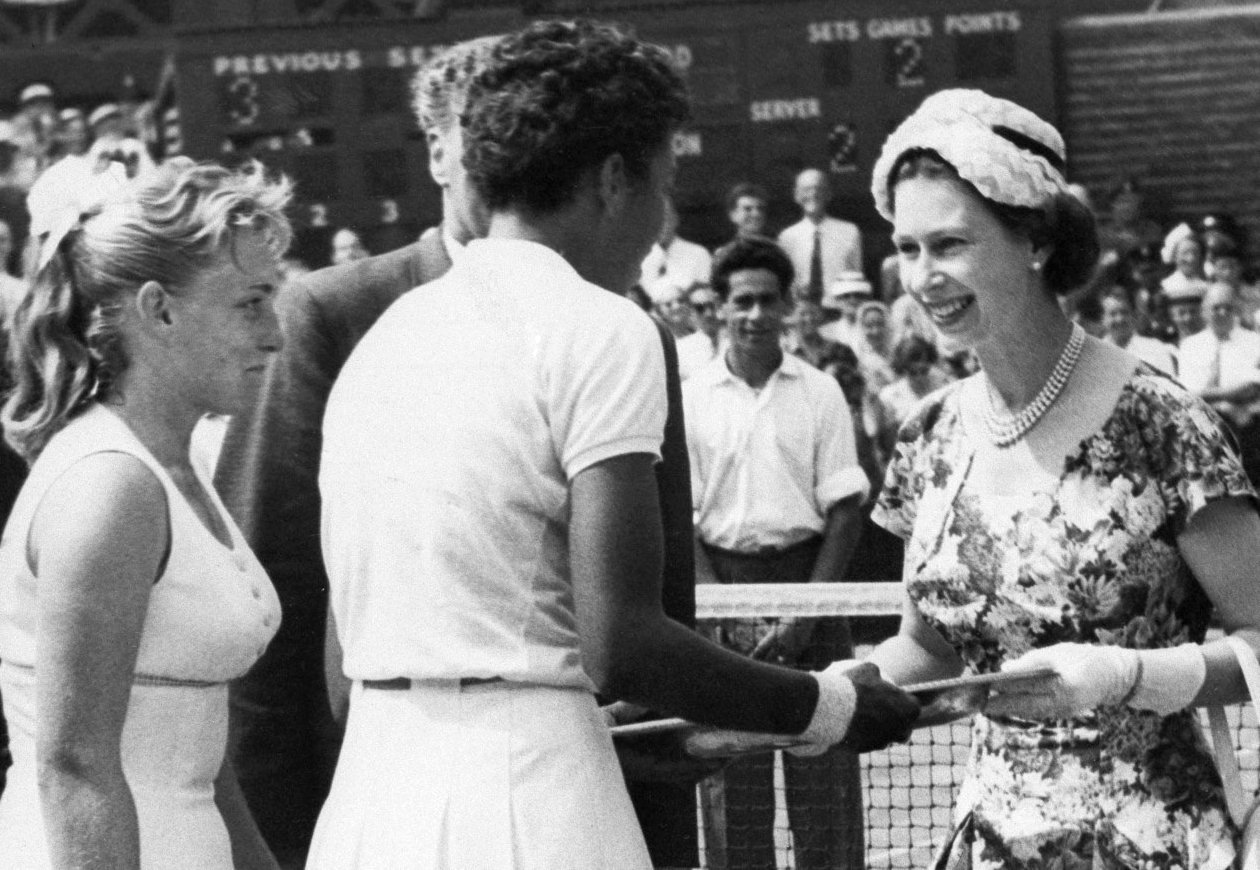
Queen Elizabeth II presents the Wimbledon championship trophy to Althea Gibson as Darlene Hard, at left, looks on (July 6, 1957).

Hard graduated from Pomona College in 1961. She was the first woman inducted into the college's athletic hall of fame in 1974.

== Career ==
She was part of the American Wightman Cup team that won the trophy against Great Britain in 1957, 1959, 1962 and 1963.

In 1964, Hard won the singles title at the South African Championships, defeating Ann Haydon-Jones in the final in straight sets, and soon afterwards turned professional when she became a teaching pro. She later owned two tennis stores.

According to a 2007 published report, she had been working for the University of Southern California since 1981 in the Publications Department.

== Personal life ==
In later life, Hard lived in the Woodland Hills section of Los Angeles. She worked at the University of Southern California in the Publications Dept. for four decades, aiding in the design and fact-checking of the University Yearbook.

Hard was openly bisexual.

Hard died at the age of 85 on December 2, 2021, from complications after a fall. She was survived by her sister, Claire. Hard's brief marriage to Richard Waggoner from 1977 to 1979 ended in divorce, and she had no children.

== Grand Slam finals ==
=== Singles: 7 (3 titles, 4 runners-up) ===
Result	Year	Championship	Surface	Opponent	Score
Loss	1957	Wimbledon	Grass	(United States) Althea Gibson	3–6, 2–6
Loss	1958	U.S. Championships	Grass	(United States) Althea Gibson	6–3, 1–6, 2–6
Loss	1959	Wimbledon	Grass	(Brazil) Maria Bueno	4–6, 3–6
Win	1960	French Championships	Clay	(Mexico) Yola Ramírez	6–3, 6–4
Win	1960	U.S. Championships	Grass	(Brazil) Maria Bueno	6–4, 10–12, 6–4
Win	1961	U.S. Championships	Grass	(United Kingdom) Ann Haydon	6–3, 6–4
Loss	1962	U.S. Championships	Grass	(Australia) Margaret Court	7–9, 4–6

=== Doubles: 18 (13 titles, 5 runners-up) ===
Result	Year	Championship	Surface	Partner	Opponents	Score
Win	1955	French Championships	Clay	(United States) Beverly Baker	(United Kingdom) Shirley Bloomer (United Kingdom) Pat Ward	7–5, 6–8, 13–11
Loss	1956	French Championships	Clay	(United States) Dorothy Head	(United Kingdom) Angela Buxton (United States) Althea Gibson	8–6, 6–8, 1–6
Win	1957	French Championships	Clay	(United Kingdom) Shirley Bloomer	(Mexico) Yola Ramírez (Mexico) Rosie Reyes	7–5, 4–6, 7–5
Win	1957	Wimbledon	Grass	(United States) Althea Gibson	(Australia) Mary Bevis Hawton (Australia) Thelma Coyne Long	6–1, 6–2
Loss	1957	U.S. Championships	Grass	(United States) Althea Gibson	(United States) Louise Brough (United States) Margaret Osborne	2–6, 5–7
Win	1958	U.S. Championships	Grass	(United States) Jeanne Arth	(Brazil) Maria Bueno (United States) Althea Gibson	2–6, 6–3, 6–4
Win	1959	Wimbledon	Grass	(United States) Jeanne Arth	(United States) Beverly Baker (United Kingdom) Christine Truman	2–6, 6–2, 6–3
Win	1959	U.S. Championships	Grass	(United States) Jeanne Arth	(Brazil) Maria Bueno (United States) Sally Moore	6–2, 6–3
Win	1960	French Championships	Clay	(Brazil) Maria Bueno	(United Kingdom) Pat Ward (United Kingdom) Ann Haydon	6–2, 7–5
Win	1960	Wimbledon	Grass	(Brazil) Maria Bueno	(South Africa) Sandra Reynolds (South Africa) Renée Schuurman	6–4, 6–0
Win	1960	U.S. Championships	Grass	(Brazil) Maria Bueno	(United Kingdom) Ann Haydon (United Kingdom) Deidre Catt	6–1, 6–1
Loss	1961	French Championships	Clay	(Brazil) Maria Bueno	(South Africa) Sandra Reynolds (South Africa) Renée Schuurman	default
Win	1961	U.S. Championships	Grass	(Australia) Lesley Turner	(West Germany) Edda Buding (Mexico) Yola Ramírez	6–4, 5–7, 6–0
Loss	1962	Australian Championships	Grass	(Australia) Mary Carter Reitano	(Australia) Robyn Ebbern (Australia) Margaret Smith	4–6, 4–6
Win	1962	U.S. Championships	Grass	(Brazil) Maria Bueno	(United States) Karen Hantze (United States) Billie Jean Moffitt	4–6, 6–3, 6–2
Win	1963	Wimbledon	Grass	(Brazil) Maria Bueno	(Australia) Robyn Ebbern (Australia) Margaret Smith	8–6, 9–7
Loss	1963	U.S. Championships	Grass	(Brazil) Maria Bueno	(Australia) Robyn Ebbern (Australia) Margaret Smith	6–4, 8–10, 3–6
Win	1969	US Open	Grass	(France) Françoise Dürr	(Australia) Margaret Court (United Kingdom) Virginia Wade	0–6, 6–3, 6–4

=== Mixed doubles: 11 (5 titles, 6 runners-up) ===
Result	Year	Championship	Surface	Partner	Opponents	Score
Win	1955	French Championships	Clay	(South Africa) Gordon Forbes	(Australia) Jenny Staley (Chile) Luis Ayala	5–7, 6–1, 6–2
Loss	1956	French Championships	Clay	(Australia) Bob Howe	(Australia) Thelma Coyne Long (Chile) Luis Ayala	6–4, 4–6, 1–6
Loss	1956	U.S. Championships	Grass	(Australia) Lew Hoad	(United States) Margaret Osborne (Australia) Ken Rosewall	7–9, 1–6
Win	1957	Wimbledon	Grass	(Australia) Mervyn Rose	(United States) Althea Gibson (Australia) Neale Fraser	6–4, 7–5
Loss	1957	U.S. Championships	Grass	(Australia) Bob Howe	(United States) Althea Gibson (Denmark) Kurt Nielsen	3–6, 7–9
Win	1959	Wimbledon	Grass	(Australia) Rod Laver	(Brazil) Maria Bueno (Australia) Neale Fraser	6–4, 6–3
Win	1960	Wimbledon	Grass	(Australia) Rod Laver	(Brazil) Maria Bueno (Australia) Bob Howe	13–11, 3–6, 8–6
Win	1961	French Championships	Clay	(Australia) Rod Laver	(Czechoslovakia) Vera Suková (Czechoslovakia) Jirí Javorský	6–0, 2–6, 6–3
Loss	1961	U.S. Championships	Grass	(United States) Dennis Ralston	(Australia) Margaret Smith (Australia) Bob Mark	default
Loss	1962	Australian Championships	Grass	(United Kingdom) Roger Taylor	(Australia) Lesley Turner (Australia) Fred Stolle	3–6, 7–9
Loss	1963	Wimbledon	Grass	(Australia) Bob Hewitt	(Australia) Margaret Smith (Australia) Ken Fletcher	9–11, 4–6

== Grand Slam singles performance timeline ==
Key
W	F	SF	QF	#R	RR	Q#	DNQ	A	NH

(W) winner; (F) finalist; (SF) semifinalist; (QF) quarterfinalist; (#R) rounds 4, 3, 2, 1; (RR) round-robin stage; (Q#) qualification round; (DNQ) did not qualify; (A) absent; (NH) not held; (SR) strike rate (events won / competed); (W–L) win–loss record.

Tournament	1953	1954	1955	1956	1957	1958	1959	1960	1961	1962	1963	1964 – 1968	1969	1970	Career SR
Australian Championships	A	A	A	A	A	A	A	A	A	QF	A	A	A	A	0 / 1
French Championships	A	A	2R	3R	QF	A	A	W	4R	A	2R	A	A	A	1 / 6
Wimbledon	A	A	SF	3R	F	A	F	QF	A	QF	SF	A	A	A	0 / 7
U.S. Championships/US Open	2R	SF	3R	QF	SF	F	SF	W	W	F	QF	A	2R	2R	2 / 13
Strike rate	0 / 1	0 / 1	0 / 3	0 / 3	0 / 3	0 / 1	0 / 2	2 / 3	1 / 2	0 / 3	0 / 3	0 / 0	0 / 1	0 / 1	3 / 27

== See also ==
- Performance timelines for all female tennis players from 1884 to 1977 who reached at least one Grand Slam final
