= 1933 Wightman Cup =

International women's tennis competition

Details
- Edition: 11th

Champion
- Winning nation: United States

The 1933 Wightman Cup was the 11th edition of the annual women's team tennis competition between the United States and Great Britain. It was held at the West Side Tennis Club in Forest Hills, Queens in New York City in the United States.

United States
4
West Side Tennis Club, Forest Hills, New York City, United States
August 1933
Grass

Great Britain
3

			1	2	3
1	(United States) (United Kingdom)	Helen Jacobs; Dorothy Round	6; 4	6; 2
2	(United States) (United Kingdom)	Sarah Palfrey; Margaret Scriven	6; 3	6; 1
3	(United States) (United Kingdom)	Carolin Babcock; Betty Nuthall	6; 1	1; 6	3; 6
4	(United States) (United Kingdom)	Sarah Palfrey; Dorothy Round	4; 6	8; 10
5	(United States) (United Kingdom)	Helen Jacobs; Margaret Scriven	5; 7	6; 2	7; 5
6	(United States) (United Kingdom)	Helen Jacobs / Sarah Palfrey; Dorothy Round / Mary Heeley	6; 4	6; 2
7	(United States) (United Kingdom)	Alice Marble / Marjorie Gladman; Betty Nuthall / Freda James	5; 7	2; 6

== See also ==
- 1933 Davis Cup
