= 1979 Wightman Cup =

Women's tennis competition

Details
- Edition: 51st

Champion
- Winning nation: United States

The 1979 Wightman Cup was the 51st edition of the annual women's team tennis competition between the United States and Great Britain. It was held in West Palm Beach, Florida in the United States.

United States
7
West Palm Beach, Florida, United States
1979
Hard (Outdoors)

Great Britain
0

			1	2	3
1	(United States) (United Kingdom)	Chris Evert-Lloyd; Sue Barker	7; 5	6; 2
2	(United States) (United Kingdom)	Kathy Jordan; Anne Hobbs	6; 4	6; 7	6; 2
3	(United States) (United Kingdom)	Tracy Austin; Virginia Wade	6; 1	6; 4
4	(United States) (United Kingdom)	Tracy Austin / Ann Kiyomura; Jo Durie / Debbie Jevans	6; 3	6; 1
5	(United States) (United Kingdom)	Tracy Austin; Sue Barker	6; 4	6; 2
6	(United States) (United Kingdom)	Chris Evert-Lloyd; Virginia Wade	6; 1	6; 1
7	(United States) (United Kingdom)	Chris Evert-Lloyd / Rosemary Casals; Sue Barker / Virginia Wade	6; 0	6; 1
