= Terry Holladay =

American tennis player

- Country (sports): United States
- Residence: Leucadia, Encinitas, California, U.S.
- Born: November 28, 1955 (age 70) Charlotte, North Carolina, U.S.
- Height: 5 ft 11 in (1.80 m)
- Turned pro: 1974
- Retired: 1988
- Plays: Left-handed (two-handed backhand)
- Prize money: $241,905

Singles
- Career record: 84–186
- Career titles: 0
- Highest ranking: Top 10

Grand Slam singles results
- Australian Open: 1R (1985, 1987)
- French Open: 1R (1985, 1986, 1987)
- Wimbledon: 4R (1977, 1980)
- US Open: 4R (1976)

Doubles
- Career record: 32–38
- Career titles: 2
- Highest ranking: No. 54

Grand Slam mixed doubles results
- Wimbledon: 2R (1975)
- US Open: 2R (1978)

Terry Holladay (born November 28, 1955) is an American former professional tennis player who played between 1974 and 1987, whose tennis career is particularly remembered for her pregnancy and its impact on protected rankings.

== Biography ==
Holladay was born in Charlotte, North Carolina, and grew up in La Jolla, San Diego, California, attending and graduating from La Jolla High School. Following her retirement from tennis, Holladay became a realtor. In 2000, she survived breast cancer. She married Dr. Philip Arthur Higginbottom, with whom she founded the Dina Humanitarian Foundation.

== Tennis career ==
She turned professional in 1974 and regards 1976 as her best year. She represented the United States in the 1976 Wightman Cup, beating Glynis Coles 3–6, 6–1, 6–4 in her only match in this competition. In 1982, she gave birth to a daughter Tasha, and was awarded special entry to six tournaments in 1983 by the WTA introducing a new rule.

She was inducted into the San Diego Tennis Hall of Fame in 2012.

== Career results ==
=== Grand Slam singles tournament timeline ===
Key
W	F	SF	QF	#R	RR	Q#	DNQ	A	NH

(W) winner; (F) finalist; (SF) semifinalist; (QF) quarterfinalist; (#R) rounds 4, 3, 2, 1; (RR) round-robin stage; (Q#) qualification round; (DNQ) did not qualify; (A) absent; (NH) not held; (SR) strike rate (events won / competed); (W–L) win–loss record.

Tournament	1975	1976	1977	1978	1979	1980	1981	1982	1983	1984	1985	1986	1987	Career SR
Australian Open	A	A	A	A	A	A	A	A	A	A	2R	NH	1R	0 / 2
French Open	A	A	A	A	A	A	A	A	A	A	1R	1R	1R	0 / 3
Wimbledon	1R	3R	4R	3R	A	4R	1R	A	A	1R	2R	A	1R	0 / 7
U.S. Open	2R	1R	2R	4R	3R	A	A	A	3R	2R	1R	1R	A	0 / 8
SR	0 / 2	0 / 2	0 / 2	0 / 2	0 / 1	0 / 1	0 / 1	0 / 0	0 / 1	0 / 2	0 / 4	0 / 2	0 / 3	0 / 23

=== Singles finals ===
Result	Date	Tournament	Surface	Opponent	Score
Loss	May 1975	Bournemouth, UK	Clay	(United States) Janet Newberry	7–9, 7–5, 6–3
Loss	Mar 1977	Dallas, Texas, US	Carpet (i)	(United Kingdom) Sue Barker	6–1, 7–6^{(7–4)}
Loss	Sep 1980	Tokyo, Japan	Carpet (i)	(United States) Billie Jean King	7–5, 6–4
Loss	Sep 1984	Salt Lake City, US	Carpet (i)	(South Africa) Yvonne Vermaak	6–3, 3–6, 6–2
Loss	Dec 1984	Port St. Lucie, US	Carpet (i)	(Sweden) Catarina Lindqvist	6–2, 2–6, 6–2

=== Doubles finals ===
Result	Date	Tournament	Surface	Partner	Opponents	Score
Loss	Sep 1984	San Diego, US	Hard	(Poland) Iwona Kuczyńska	(United States) Betsy Nagelsen (United States) Paula Smith	2–6, 4–6
Win	Jun 1985	Birmingham, UK	Grass	(United States) Sharon Walsh	(United States) Elise Burgin (United States) Alycia Moulton	6–4, 5–7, 6–3
Win	Jul 1986	Newport, US	Grass	(United States) Heather Ludloff	(United States) Cynthia MacGregor (United States) Gretchen Magers	6–1, 6–7, 6–3
