= Valerie Scott (tennis) =

English tennis player

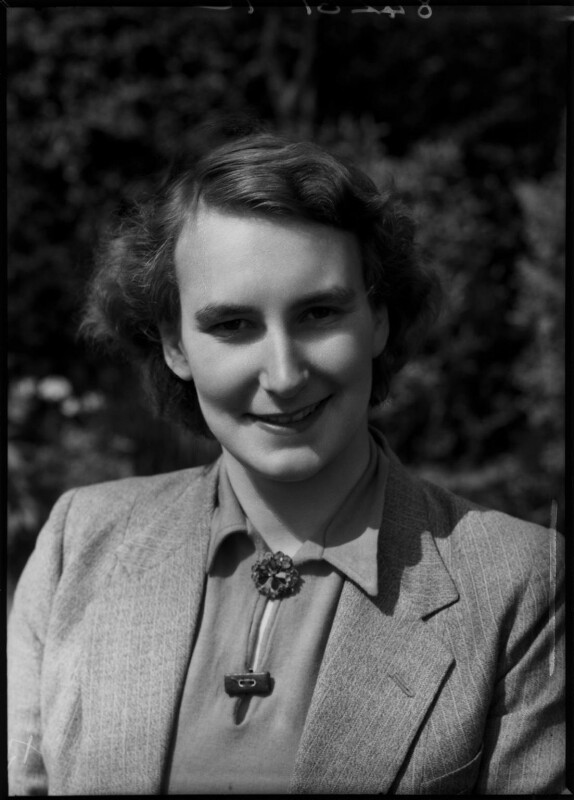
- Scott in 1938
- Full name: Valerie Eveline Scott
- Country (sports): United Kingdom
- Born: 7 January 1918; Bedford, England
- Died: 1 April 2001 (aged 83); Milwaukee, Wisconsin

Singles

Grand Slam singles results
- Wimbledon: 4R (1939)
- US Open: SF (1940)
- Wimbledon Junior: W (1935)

Grand Slam mixed doubles results
- Wimbledon: 4R (1937)

Valerie Eveline Scott (7 January 1918 – 1 April 2001) was an English tennis player.

Scott won the 1935 Junior Wimbledon Championship and competed in the 1936, 1937, 1938 and 1939 Championships, advancing to the fourth round of the 1937 mixed competition and again in the 1939 singles competition. She was part of the British team that competed in the 1939 Wightman Cup.

In 1942, Scott was arrested in Florida, along with Margaret Schuyler Sternbergh, and accused of threatening Frances Lynch, a wealthy woman. The pair had allegedly used threats to induce Lynch to hire Scott as her secretary. The case was dismissed later that year, following Lynch's death.

In 1951, Scott established the River Tennis Club in Milwaukee, Wisconsin. She managed the club and acted as the resident professional until her 1981 retirement. In 1986, in recognition of her contributions to the sport, she was granted a Distinguished Service Award by the United States Professional Tennis Association.
