= Rosie Casals =

American tennis player

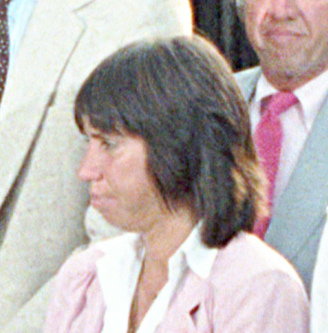
- Casals in 1981
- Full name: Rosemary Casals
- ITF name: Rosie Casals
- Country (sports): United States
- Born: September 16, 1948 (age 77) San Francisco, California, U.S.
- Height: 5 ft 2 1/2 in (1.59 m)
- Turned pro: 1968
- Plays: Right-handed
- Prize money: US$ 1,362,222
- Int. Tennis HoF: 1996 (member page)

Singles
- Career record: 595–325
- Career titles: 11
- Highest ranking: No. 3 (1970)

Grand Slam singles results
- Australian Open: SF (1967)
- French Open: QF (1969, 1970)
- Wimbledon: SF (1967, 1969, 1970, 1972)
- US Open: F (1970, 1971)

Doubles
- Career record: 508–214

Grand Slam doubles results
- Australian Open: F (1969)
- French Open: F (1968, 1970, 1980)
- Wimbledon: W (1967, 1968, 1970, 1971, 1973)
- US Open: W (1967, 1971, 1974, 1982)

Other doubles tournaments
- Tour Finals: W (1971, 1973, 1974)
- Career titles: 3

Grand Slam mixed doubles results
- Australian Open: SF (1969)
- French Open: SF (1969, 1970, 1972)
- Wimbledon: W (1970, 1972)
- US Open: W (1975)

Team competitions
- Fed Cup: W (1970, 1976, 1977, 1978, 1979, 1980, 1981)
- Wightman Cup: W (1967, 1976, 1977, 1979, 1980, 1981, 1982)

Rosemary Casals (born September 16, 1948) is an American former professional tennis player. During a tennis career that spanned more than two decades, she won more than 90 titles and was crucial to many of the changes in women's tennis during the 1960s and 1970s. Casals was inducted into the International Tennis Hall of Fame in 1996.

== Early life ==
Casals was born in 1948 in San Francisco to parents who had immigrated to the United States from El Salvador. One of her paternal great-uncles was the world renowned Spanish cellist Pau Casals, whom she would never meet. Less than a year after Casals was born, her parents decided they could not care for her and her older sister Victoria. Casals's great-uncle and great-aunt, Manuel and Maria Casals, raised them as their own. When the children grew older, Manuel Casals took them to the public tennis courts of San Francisco and taught them how to play the game. He became the only coach Casals had. However, Nick Carter, gave some lessons. Casals attended San Francisco's George Washington High School.

At five-feet-two-inches tall, she was one of the shorter players on the court. Traditionally, tennis was a sport practiced in expensive country clubs. Casals's ethnic heritage and poor background immediately set her apart from most of the other players. "The other kids had nice tennis clothes, nice rackets, nice white shoes, and came in Cadillacs," Casals told a reporter for People. "I felt stigmatized because we were poor."

Later in her career, she became known for her brightly colored outfits, designed for her by Ted Tinling.

== Tennis career ==
Casals was known as a determined player who used any shot available to her to score a point. "I wanted to be someone," Casals was quoted as saying in Alida M. Thacher's Raising a Racket: Rosie Casals. "I knew I was good, and winning tournaments — it's a kind of way of being accepted." By age 16, Casals was the top junior and women's level player in Northern California. At 17, she was ranked eleventh in the U.S. In 1966, she and Billie Jean King, her doubles partner, won the U.S. hard-court and indoor tournaments. In 1967, Casals and King took the doubles crown at Wimbledon and at the United States and South African championships. The two became one of the more successful duos in tennis history. Casals was also a successful individual player, ranking third among U.S. women during this period.

Casals also became involved in World Team Tennis, and she played with the Detroit Loves in 1974, the Los Angeles Strings from 1975 through 1977, the Anaheim Oranges in 1978, and the Oakland Breakers in 1982, before serving as the player-coach of the San Diego Friars in 1983. She later played for the St. Louis Eagles in 1984, the Chicago Fyre in 1985, the Miami Beach Breakers in 1986, and the Fresno Sun-Nets in 1988.

Casals won 112 professional doubles tournaments, the second most in history behind Martina Navratilova. Her last doubles championship was at the 1988 tournament in Oakland, California, where her partner was Navratilova.

Casals played in a total of 685 singles and doubles tournaments during her career.

== Fights for rights of professional and women players ==
With Billie Jean King, Casals challenged the large difference in prize monies awarded to male and female players. Women earned much smaller prizes. In 1970, Casals and other women threatened to boycott the Pacific Southwest Championships if they were not paid higher prize money and not given more media attention. The ruling body of U.S. tennis, the United States Lawn Tennis Association (USLTA), refused to listen to their demands. In response, the women established the 1970 Virginia Slims Invitational. The attention generated by this successful tournament, which was won by Casals, quickly brought about the formation of other women's tournaments and greater prize monies for women.

In 1979, the Supersisters trading card set was produced and distributed; one of the cards featured Casals's name and picture.

== Post-tennis career and personal life ==
Casals underwent knee surgery in 1978 and was forced to change career directions. Since 1981 she has been president of Sportswomen, Inc., a California company she formed to promote a Women's Classic tour for older female players. She also began the Midnight Productions television company. In 1990, she again teamed with Billie Jean King, this time to win the U.S. Open Seniors' women's doubles championship.

== Portrayal in film ==
- Elizabeth Berridge played Casals in the 2001 TV movie When Billie Beat Bobby.
- Natalie Morales plays Casals in the 2017 film Battle of the Sexes.

== Grand Slam finals ==
=== Singles: 2 (2 runner-ups) ===
Result	Year	Championship	Surface	Opponent	Score
Loss	1970	US Open	Grass	(Australia) Margaret Court	2–6, 6–2, 1–6
Loss	1971	US Open	Grass	(United States) Billie Jean King	4–6, 6–7^{(2–5)}

=== Doubles: 21 (9 titles, 12 runner-ups) ===
Result	Year	Championship	Surface	Partner	Opponents	Score
Loss	1966	U.S. Championships	Grass	(United States) Billie Jean King	(Brazil) Maria Bueno (United States) Nancy Richey	3–6, 4–6
Win	1967	Wimbledon	Grass	(United States) Billie Jean King	(Brazil) Maria Bueno (United States) Nancy Richey	9–11, 6–4, 6–2
Win	1967	U.S. Championships	Grass	(United States) Billie Jean King	(United States) Mary-Ann Eisel (United States) Donna Floyd Fales	4–6, 6–3, 6–4
Loss	1968	French Open	Clay	(United States) Billie Jean King	(France) Françoise Dürr (United Kingdom) Ann Haydon-Jones	5–7, 6–4, 4–6
Win	1968	Wimbledon (2)	Grass	(United States) Billie Jean King	(France) Françoise Dürr (United Kingdom) Ann Haydon-Jones	3–6, 6–4, 7–5
Loss	1968	US Open (2)	Grass	(United States) Billie Jean King	(Brazil) Maria Bueno (Australia) Margaret Court	6–4, 7–9, 6–8
Loss	1969	Australian Open	Grass	(United States) Billie Jean King	(Australia) Margaret Court (Australia) Judy Tegart Dalton	4–6, 4–6
Loss	1970	French Open (2)	Clay	(United States) Billie Jean King	(France) Françoise Dürr (France) Gail Lovera	1–6, 6–3, 3–6
Win	1970	Wimbledon (3)	Grass	(United States) Billie Jean King	(France) Françoise Dürr (United Kingdom) Virginia Wade	6–2, 6–3
Loss	1970	US Open (3)	Grass	(United Kingdom) Virginia Wade	(Australia) Margaret Court (Australia) Julie Tegart Dalton	3–6, 4–6
Win	1971	Wimbledon (4)	Grass	(United States) Billie Jean King	(Australia) Margaret Court (Australia) Evonne Goolagong	6–3, 6–2
Win	1971	US Open (2)	Grass	(Australia) Judy Tegart Dalton	(France) Françoise Dürr (France) Gail Lovera	6–3, 6–3
Win	1973	Wimbledon (5)	Grass	(United States) Billie Jean King	(France) Françoise Dürr (Netherlands) Betty Stöve	6–1, 4–6, 7–5
Loss	1973	US Open (4)	Grass	(United States) Billie Jean King	(Australia) Margaret Court (United Kingdom) Virginia Wade	6–3, 3–6, 5–7
Win	1974	US Open (3)	Grass	(United States) Billie Jean King	(France) Françoise Dürr (Netherlands) Betty Stöve	7–6, 6–7, 6–4
Loss	1975	US Open (5)	Clay	(United States) Billie Jean King	(Australia) Margaret Court (United Kingdom) Virginia Wade	5–7, 6–2, 6–7
Loss	1980	French Open (2)	Clay	(Australia) Wendy Turnbull	(United States) Anne Smith (United States) Martina Navratilova	3–6, 4–6
Loss	1980	Wimbledon	Grass	(Australia) Wendy Turnbull	(United States) Kathy Jordan (United States) Anne Smith	6–4, 5–7, 1–6
Loss	1981	US Open (6)	Hard	(Australia) Wendy Turnbull	(United States) Kathy Jordan (United States) Anne Smith	3–6, 3–6
Win	1982	US Open (4)	Hard	(Australia) Wendy Turnbull	(United States) Barbara Potter (United States) Sharon Walsh	6–4, 6–4
Loss	1983	Wimbledon (2)	Grass	(Australia) Wendy Turnbull	(United States) Pam Shriver (United States) Martina Navratilova	2–6, 2–6

=== Mixed doubles: 6 (3 titles, 3 runner-ups) ===
Result	Year	Championship	Surface	Partner	Opponents	Score
Loss	1967	U.S. Championships	Grass	(United States) Stan Smith	(United States) Billie Jean King (Australia) Owen Davidson	3–6, 2–6
Win	1970	Wimbledon	Grass	(Romania) Ilie Năstase	(Soviet Union) Olga Morozova (Soviet Union) Alex Metreveli	6–3, 4–6, 9–7
Win	1972	Wimbledon (2)	Grass	(Romania) Ilie Năstase	(Australia) Evonne Goolagong (Australia) Kim Warwick	6–4, 6–4
Loss	1972	US Open (2)	Grass	(Romania) Ilie Năstase	(Australia) Margaret Court (United States) Marty Riessen	3–6, 5–7
Win	1975	US Open	Clay	(United States) Dick Stockton	(Australia) Fred Stolle (United States) Billie Jean King	6–3, 6–7, 6–3
Loss	1976	Wimbledon	Grass	(United States) Dick Stockton	(France) Françoise Dürr (Australia) Tony Roche	3–6, 6–2, 5–7

== Grand Slam singles tournament timeline ==
Key
W	F	SF	QF	#R	RR	Q#	DNQ	A	NH

(W) winner; (F) finalist; (SF) semifinalist; (QF) quarterfinalist; (#R) rounds 4, 3, 2, 1; (RR) round-robin stage; (Q#) qualification round; (DNQ) did not qualify; (A) absent; (NH) not held; (SR) strike rate (events won / competed); (W–L) win–loss record.

Tournament	1964	1965	1966	1967	1968	1969	1970	1971	1972	1973	1974	1975	1976	1977	1978	1979	1980	1981	1982	1983	1984	1985	Career SR
Australia	A	A	A	SF	QF	QF	A	A	A	A	A	A	A	A / A	A	A	1R	1R	A	A	A	A	0 / 5
France	A	A	A	4R	4R	QF	QF	A	1R	A	A	A	A	A	A	1R	A	2R	A	A	A	A	0 / 7
Wimbledon (UK)	A	A	4R	SF	4R	SF	SF	2R	SF	QF	4R	4R	QF	QF	A	3R	2R	1R	2R	3R	1R	A	0 / 18
United States	3R	1R	SF	4R	3R	SF	F	F	QF	QF	QF	1R	QF	4R	A	1R	1R	4R	2R	3R	2R	2R	0 / 21
SR	0 / 1	0 / 1	0 / 2	0 / 4	0 / 4	0 / 4	0 / 3	0 / 2	0 / 3	0 / 2	0 / 2	0 / 2	0 / 2	0 / 2	0 / 0	0 / 3	0 / 3	0 / 4	0 / 2	0 / 2	0 / 2	0 / 1	0 / 51

Note: The Australian Open was held twice in 1977, in January and December.

Casals was originally seeded 14th for the 1978 Wimbledon Championships, but a knee injury forced her withdrawal before the draw was made

== See also ==
- Performance timelines for all female tennis players since 1978 who reached at least one Grand Slam final
