= 1957 Wightman Cup =

International women's tennis competition

Details
- Edition: 29th

Champion
- Winning nation: United States

The 1957 Wightman Cup was the 29th edition of the annual women's team tennis competition between the United States and Great Britain. It was held in August 1957 in Edgeworth, Pennsylvania in the United States.

United States
6
Edgeworth, Pennsylvania, United States
August 1957
Grass

Great Britain
1

			1	2	3
1	(United States) (United Kingdom)	Althea Gibson; Shirley Bloomer	6; 4	4; 6	6; 2
2	(United States) (United Kingdom)	Dorothy Head Knode; Christine Truman	6; 2	11; 9
3	(United States) (United Kingdom)	Darlene Hard; Ann Haydon	3; 6	6; 3	4; 6
4	(United States) (United Kingdom)	Dorothy Head Knode; Shirley Bloomer	5; 7	6; 1	6; 2
5	(United States) (United Kingdom)	Althea Gibson; Christine Truman	6; 4	6; 2
6	(United States) (United Kingdom)	Althea Gibson / Darlene Hard; Sheila Armstrong / Shirley Bloomer	6; 3	6; 4
7	(United States) (United Kingdom)	Louise Brough / Margaret Osborne duPont; Ann Haydon / Anne Shilcock	6; 4	6; 1
