= 1975 Wightman Cup =

International women's tennis competition

Details
- Edition: 47th

Champion
- Winning nation: Great Britain

The 1975 Wightman Cup was the 47th edition of the annual women's team tennis competition between the United States and Great Britain. It was held at the Public Auditorium in Cleveland, Ohio in the United States.

United States
2
Public Auditorium, Cleveland, Ohio, United States
1975
Hard (Indoors)

Great Britain
5

			1	2	3
1	(United States) (United Kingdom)	Mona Schallau; Virginia Wade	2; 6	2; 6
2	(United States) (United Kingdom)	Chris Evert; Glynis Coles	6; 4	6; 1
3	(United States) (United Kingdom)	Janet Newberry; Sue Barker	4; 6	5; 7
4	(United States) (United Kingdom)	Julie Anthony / Janet Newberry; Ann Haydon-Jones / Virginia Wade	2; 6	3; 6
5	(United States) (United Kingdom)	Chris Evert; Virginia Wade	6; 3	7; 5
6	(United States) (United Kingdom)	Mona Schallau; Glynis Coles	3; 6	6; 7
7	(United States) (United Kingdom)	Chris Evert / Mona Schallau; Sue Barker / Glynis Coles	5; 7	4; 6
