= 1988 Northern California Open – Singles =

Singles
- 1988 Northern California Open
- 1987 Champion: (United States) Elly Hakami

Final
- Champion: (United Kingdom) Sara Gomer
- Runner-up: (United States) Robin White
- Score: 6–4, 7–5

Events
Singles	Doubles
← 1987 ·	Northern California Open	· 1989 →

The 1988 Northern California Open singles was a tennis competition, part of the 1988 Northern California Open organised by the Women's Tennis Association. It was played on outdoor hard courts in Aptos, California in the United States and was part of Tier V of the 1988 WTA Tour. The tournament ran from July 25 through July 31, 1988.

Elly Hakami was the defending champion, but lost in the first round to Jennifer Santrock.

Sara Gomer won in the final 6–4, 7–5 against Robin White.

== Seeds ==
A champion seed is indicated in bold text while text in italics indicates the round in which that seed was eliminated.

1. (United States) Patty Fendick (semifinals)
2. (United States) Stephanie Rehe (semifinals)
3. (United States) Elly Hakami (first round)
4. (United States) Robin White (final)
5. (United States) Gretchen Magers (quarterfinals)
6. (United States) Anne White (quarterfinals)
7. (United Kingdom) **Sara Gomer (champion)**
8. (United Kingdom) Jo Durie (quarterfinals)

== Draw ==
=== Key ===
- Q = Qualifier
- WC = Wild card
- LL = Lucky loser
- Alt = Alternate
- SE = Special exempt
- PR = Protected ranking
- ITF = ITF entry
- JE = Junior exempt
- w/o = Walkover
- r = Retired
- d = Defaulted
- SR = Special ranking

First round
1	(United States) **P Fendick**	1	**6**	**6**
(United States) K Keil	**6**	3	3
(United States) C Benjamin	4	2
(United States) **L Green**	**6**	**6**
(United States) **M Werdel**	**6**	2	**6**
(United States) B Herr	2	**6**	3
(Peru) P Vásquez	**6**	1	6
8	(United Kingdom) **J Durie**	3	**6**	**7**
4	(United States) **R White**	**7**	**6**
(West Germany) C Singer	6	3
(Australia) **M Jaggard**	**6**	3	**6**
(Canada) J Hetherington	1	**6**	4
Q	(United States) **A Ivan**	**7**	**7**
(United States) D Faber	5	5
(United States) A Farley	5	0
6	(United States) **A Smith**	**7**	**6**
7	(United Kingdom) **S Gomer**	**6**	**7**
(United States) T Mochizuki	3	5
(United States) R Reis	**6**	5	3
(South Africa) **K Schimper**	3	**7**	**6**
Q	(United States) **A Grossman**	**6**	**6**
(United States) K Rinaldi	3	0
Q	(United States) **J Santrock**	**6**	**6**
3	(United States) E Hakami	3	4
5	(United States) **G Magers**	**6**	**6**
(Czechoslovakia) A Holíková	2	2
Q	(United States) L Allen	**7**	3	2
(New Zealand) **J Richardson**	5	**6**	**6**
(United States) H Na	4	5
(United States) **C MacGregor**	**6**	**7**
(United States) L Bonder	0	4
2	(United States) **S Rehe**	**6**	**6**

Second round
1	(United States) **P Fendick**	4	**6**	**6**
(United States) L Green	**6**	0	2
(United States) M Werdel	2	2
8	(United Kingdom) **J Durie**	**6**	**6**
4	(United States) **R White**	**6**	**7**
(Australia) M Jaggard	4	5
Q	(United States) A Ivan	2	3
6	(United States) **A Smith**	**6**	**6**
7	(United Kingdom) **S Gomer**	**6**	**6**
(South Africa) K Schimper	1	0
Q	(United States) **A Grossman**	**6**	**7**
Q	(United States) J Santrock	4	5
5	(United States) **G Magers**	**7**	**6**
(New Zealand) J Richardson	6	1
(United States) C MacGregor	6	5
2	(United States) **S Rehe**	**7**	**7**

Quarterfinals
1	(United States) **P Fendick**	**7**	0	**7**
8	(United Kingdom) J Durie	5	**6**	6
4	(United States) **R White**	**6**	**6**
6	(United States) A Smith	4	4
7	(United Kingdom) **S Gomer**	**7**	**6**
Q	(United States) A Grossman	6	2
5	(United States) G Magers	6	1
2	(United States) **S Rehe**	**7**	**6**

Semifinals
1	(United States) P Fendick	3	**6**	2
4	(United States) **R White**	**6**	3	**6**
7	(United Kingdom) **S Gomer**	**6**	**7**
2	(United States) S Rehe	2	6

Final
4	(United States) Robin White	4	5
7	(United Kingdom) **Sara Gomer**	**6**	**7**
