= 1988 Northern California Open – Doubles =

Doubles
- 1988 Northern California Open
- 1987 Champions: (United States) Kathy Jordan (United States) Robin White

Final
- Champions: (South Africa) Lise Gregory (United States) Ronni Reis
- Runners-up: (United States) Patty Fendick (Canada) Jill Hetherington
- Score: 6–3, 6–4

Events
Singles	Doubles
← 1987 ·	Northern California Open	· 1989 →

Kathy Jordan and Robin White were the defending champions but only White competed that year with Anne Smith.

Smith and White lost in the semifinals to Lise Gregory and Ronni Reis.

Gregory and Reis won in the final 6–3, 6–4 against Patty Fendick and Jill Hetherington.

== Seeds ==
Champion seeds are indicated in bold text while text in italics indicates the round in which those seeds were eliminated.

1. (United States) Patty Fendick / (Canada) Jill Hetherington (final)
2. (South Africa) **Lise Gregory** / (United States) **Ronni Reis (champions)**
3. (United States) Anne Smith / (United States) Robin White (semifinals)
4. (United States) Lea Antonoplis / (United States) Beth Herr (first round)

== Draw ==
=== Key ===
- Q = Qualifier
- WC = Wild card
- LL = Lucky loser
- Alt = Alternate
- SE = Special exempt
- PR = Protected ranking
- ITF = ITF entry
- JE = Junior exempt
- w/o = Walkover
- r = Retired
- d = Defaulted
- SR = Special ranking

First round
1	(United States) **P Fendick** (Canada) **J Hetherington**	**6**	**6**
(United States) J Thomas (Brazil) T Zambrzycki	1	1
(United States) **A Grousbeck** (United Kingdom) **V Lake**	**6**	**6**
(United States) A Grossman (Australia) K Staunton	3	2
4	(United States) L Antonoplis (United States) B Herr	6	**6**	1
(United States) **L Allen** (United States) **G Magers**	**7**	3	**6**
(Philippines) J Lozano (United States) T Silveria	1	1
(United States) **C Benjamin** (United States) **H Na**	**6**	**6**
(United States) **E Hakami** (South Africa) **K Schimper**	4	**7**	**7**
(United States) L Bartlett (United States) S Savides	**6**	5	5
(Japan) E Iida (United States) P Smith	1	0
3	(United States) **A Smith** (United States) **R White**	**6**	**6**
(United States) **S Rehe** (West Germany) **C Singer**	**6**	**6**
(South Africa) L Barnard (South Africa) A Coetzer	3	4
(Australia) M Jaggard (New Zealand) J Richardson	0	2
2	(South Africa) **L Gregory** (United States) **R Reis**	**6**	**6**

Quarterfinals
1	(United States) **P Fendick** (Canada) **J Hetherington**	**6**	**6**
(United States) A Grousbeck (United Kingdom) V Lake	3	3
(United States) **L Allen** (United States) **G Magers**	**6**	1	**7**
(United States) C Benjamin (United States) H Na	2	**6**	6
(United States) E Hakami (South Africa) K Schimper	**7**	4	5
3	(United States) **A Smith** (United States) **R White**	5	**6**	**7**
(United States) S Rehe (West Germany) C Singer	4	2
2	(South Africa) **L Gregory** (United States) **R Reis**	**6**	**6**

Semifinals
1	(United States) **P Fendick** (Canada) **J Hetherington**	**6**	**7**
(United States) L Allen (United States) G Magers	4	6
3	(United States) A Smith (United States) R White	**6**	1	1
2	(South Africa) **L Gregory** (United States) **R Reis**	3	**6**	**6**

Final
1	(United States) Patty Fendick (United States) Ronni Reis	3	4
2	(South Africa) **Lise Gregory** (United States) **Ronni Reis**	**6**	**6**
