= 1976 WTA Westchester Invitational =

- Date: August 24–29
- Edition: 5th
- Prize money: $10,000
- Surface: Clay
- Location: Harrison, New York, United States
- Venue: Westchester Country Club

Champions

Singles
- (United States) Beth Norton

Doubles
- (United States) Patricia Bostrom / (United States) Janice Metcalf
- WTA Westchester Invitational

The 1976 WTA Westchester Invitational was a women's tennis tournament that took place on clay courts at the Westchester Country Club in Harrison, Westchester County, New York in the United States. It was part of the 1976 WTA Tour and was held from on August 24 through August 29, 1976. The tournament was organized on short notice by the WTA after 25 players withdrew from the Tennis Week Open after transgender player Renée Richards received a wildcard. Fifth-seeded Beth Norton won the singles title and earned $1,800 first-prize money.

== Finals ==
=== Singles ===
(United States) Beth Norton defeated (United States) Ruta Gerulaitis 1–6, 7–5, 6–3

=== Doubles ===
(United States) Patricia Bostrom / (United States) Janice Metcalf defeated (United States) Laura DuPont / (United States) Valerie Ziegenfuss 6–2, 6–3
