= 1938 Wightman Cup =

International women's tennis competition

Details
- Edition: 16th

Champion
- Winning nation: United States

The 1938 Wightman Cup was the 16th edition of the annual women's team tennis competition between the United States and Great Britain. It was held on 10 and 11 June at the All England Lawn Tennis and Croquet Club in London, United Kingdom.

Great Britain
2
All England Lawn Tennis and Croquet Club, London, England, United Kingdom
10–11 June 1938
Grass

United States
5

			1	2	3
1	(United Kingdom) (United States)	Kay Stammers; Alice Marble	3; 6	7; 5	6; 3
2	(United Kingdom) (United States)	Margaret Scriven; Helen Wills Moody	0; 6	5; 7
3	(United Kingdom) (United States)	Margot Lumb; Sarah Palfrey Fabyan	7; 5	2; 6	3; 6
4	(United Kingdom) (United States)	Margaret Scriven; Alice Marble	3; 6	6; 3	0; 6
5	(United Kingdom) (United States)	Kay Stammers; Helen Wills Moody	2; 6	6; 3	3; 6
6	(United Kingdom) (United States)	Margot Lumb / Freda James; Alice Marble / Sarah Palfrey Fabyan	4; 6	2; 6
7	(United Kingdom) (United States)	Evelyn Dearman / Joan Ingram; Helen Wills Moody / Dorothy Bundy	6; 2	7; 5
