= 1976 Colgate International =

- Date: 14–20 June
- Edition: 3rd
- Category: Colgate Series (AA)
- Draw: 64S / 32D
- Prize money: $88,500
- Surface: Grass / outdoor
- Location: Eastbourne, United Kingdom
- Venue: Devonshire Park

Champions

Singles
- (United States) Chris Evert

Doubles
- (United States) Chris Evert / (United States) Martina Navratilova (Soviet Union) Olga Morozova / (United Kingdom) Virginia Wade
- Eastbourne International

The 1976 Colgate International was a women's tennis tournament played on outdoor grass courts at Devonshire Park in Eastbourne in the United Kingdom. The event was part of the 1976 WTA Tour. It was the third edition of the tournament and was held from 14 June through 20 June 1976. First-seeded Chris Evert won the singles title and earned £9,000 first-prize money.

== Finals ==
=== Singles ===
(United States) Chris Evert defeated (United Kingdom) Virginia Wade 8–6, 6–3

- It was Evert's 7th singles title of the year and the 62nd of her career.

=== Doubles ===
(United States) Chris Evert / (United States) Martina Navratilova led (Soviet Union) Olga Morozova / (United Kingdom) Virginia Wade 6–4, 1–1 divided due to rain

== Prize money ==
Event	W	F	SF	QF	Round of 16	Round of 32	Round of 64
Singles	£9,000	£5,000	£2,500	£1,000	£600	£200	£200
