= 1989 Wightman Cup =

International women's tennis competition

Details
- Edition: 61st

Champion
- Winning nation: United States

The 1989 Wightman Cup was the 61st and final edition of the annual women's international tennis competition between the United States and Great Britain. It was held at The College of William & Mary in Williamsburg, Virginia in the United States and played on indoor hard courts. The Wightman Cup was discontinued on February 20, 1990.

== Notable stories ==
=== Youngest player ever to play in Wightman Cup ===
In this edition of the Cup 13-year-old Jennifer Capriati played the second match against Clare Wood, notching a 6–0, 6–0 victory over the Briton. She became the youngest player to play in the Wightman Cup's history, beating the previous record by two years.

United States
7
The College of William & Mary, Williamsburg, Virginia, United States
1989
Hard (Indoors)

Great Britain
0

			1	2	3
1	(United States) (United Kingdom)	Lori McNeil; Jo Durie	7; 5	6; 1
2	(United States) (United Kingdom)	Jennifer Capriati; Clare Wood	6; 0	6; 0
3	(United States) (United Kingdom)	Mary Joe Fernández; Sara Gomer	6; 1	6; 2
4	(United States) (United Kingdom)	Mary Joe Fernández / Betsy Nagelsen; Sara Gomer / Clare Wood	6; 2	7; 6
5	(United States) (United Kingdom)	Lori McNeil; Sara Gomer	6; 4	6; 2
6	(United States) (United Kingdom)	Mary Joe Fernández; Jo Durie	6; 1	7; 5
7	(United States) (United Kingdom)	Patty Fendick / Lori McNeil; Jo Durie / Anne Hobbs	6; 3	6; 3
