= Sara Gomer =

British tennis player

- Full name: Sara Louise Gomer
- Country (sports): United Kingdom
- Born: 13 May 1964 (age 62) Torquay, Devon, England
- Height: 6 ft 2 in (188 cm)
- Retired: 1992
- Prize money: $332,445

Singles
- Career record: 153–163
- Career titles: 1
- Highest ranking: No. 46 (26 September 1988)

Grand Slam singles results
- Australian Open: 3R (1985)
- French Open: 2R (1987, 1989, 1992)
- Wimbledon: 2R (1985–86, 1988–90)
- US Open: 3R (1991)

Doubles
- Career record: 28–80
- Career titles: 0
- Highest ranking: No. 149 (21 December 1986)

Sara Louise Gomer (born 13 May 1964) is a retired tennis player from Great Britain. A left-hander, she competed for Britain at the 1988 Summer Olympics in Seoul and the 1992 Summer Olympics in Barcelona. She won two singles titles on the ITF Circuit, and reached her highest individual ranking on the WTA Tour on 26 September 1988, when she became number 46 in the world and number 1 in Great Britain. Gomer won one WTA singles title, the 1988 Northern California Open, in Aptos, California, coached by Chris Bradnam. She became the last British WTA title-winner until Heather Watson won the 2012 HP Open.

She played in four editions of the Wightman Cup, playing five singles and four doubles matches, which were all losses, from 1986 to 1989. When she lost in the first round of the 1985 U.S. Open, her opponent Mary Joe Fernández, aged 14 years and 8 days, became the youngest player to win a main draw match at any U.S. Open.

She played in the French Open in 1983, 1985–87, 1989, 1991, and 1992; in the Australian Open in 1983–85, 1987–88, and 1990–1992; and in the US Open in 1983, 1985–89, and 1991–92. She played at the Wimbledon Championships every year from 1981 to 1992.

She reached the quarterfinal of the 1987 Federation Cup and the consolation final of the 1988 Federation Cup.

Gomer retired from competitive tennis in 1992. Soon afterwards she married John Palombo, an IT expert. They have three children. She now only plays tennis occasionally.

== WTA Tour finals ==
=== Singles (1 title) ===
Legend
Grand Slam tournaments (0/0)
WTA Championships (0/0)
Virginia Slims (0/0)
Tier I (0/0)
Tier II (0/0)
Tier III (0/0)
Tier IV & V (1/0)

| Outcome | No. | Date | Tournament | Surface | Opponent | Score |
|---|---|---|---|---|---|---|
| Winner | 1. | 31 July 1988 | Aptos, California | Hard | (United States) Robin White | 6–4, 7–5 |
