= United States Wightman Cup team =

International women's tennis team

United States
- Ties played (W–L): 61 (51-10)
- Titles: 51
- Runners-up: 10

The United States Wightman Cup team was the more successful team in the Wightman Cup tennis competition. The team won 51 titles out of 61 participations.

== History ==
The United States won the inaugural Wightman Cup in 1923. They won 51 out of 61 titles, including a run of nine straight titles between 1931 and 1939 before World War II, another run of twelve straight titles between 1946 and 1957, and a further run of eleven straight titles between 1979 and 1989.

=== Members of the inaugural team ===
- Hazel Hotchkiss Wightman
- Eleanor Goss
- Molla Mallory
- Helen Wills

=== Members of the last team ===
- Jennifer Capriati
- Patty Fendick
- Mary Joe Fernández
- Lori McNeil
- Betsy Nagelsen

== See also ==
- Wightman Cup
- United States Fed Cup team
- United States Davis Cup team
