= Great Britain Wightman Cup team =

International women's tennis team

Great Britain
- Ties played (W–L): 61 (10-51)
- Titles: 10
- Runners-up: 51

The Great Britain Wightman Cup team was the less successful team in the Wightman Cup tennis competition. The team won 10 titles out of 61 participations.

== History ==
Great Britain won their first Wightman Cup in 1924. They won 10 out of 61 titles, only retaining the cup on two occasions; from 1924 to 1925 and from 1974 to 1975. Great Britain won its last Wightman Cup in 1978. In 1989, after eleven straight defeats, the Wightman Cup was wound up.

=== Members of the inaugural team ===
- Geraldine Beamish
- Mabel Clayton
- Phyllis Covell
- Kathleen McKane

=== Members of the last team ===
- Jo Durie
- Sara Gomer
- Anne Hobbs
- Clare Wood

== See also ==
- Wightman Cup
- Great Britain Fed Cup team
- Great Britain Davis Cup team
