= 1984 Virginia Slims of Pennsylvania – Singles =

Singles
- 1984 Virginia Slims of Pennsylvania

Final
- Champion: (Sweden) Catarina Lindqvist
- Runner-up: (United States) Beth Herr
- Score: 6–4, 6–0

Details
- Draw: 32 (4Q)
- Seeds: 8

Events
Singles	Doubles
← 1983 ·	Virginia Slims of Pennsylvania	· 1985 →

Carling Bassett was the defending champion, but did not compete this year.

Qualifier Catarina Lindqvist won the title by defeating Beth Herr 6–4, 6–0 in the final.

== Seeds ==
1. (United States) Beth Herr (final)
2. (United States) Andrea Leand (first round)
3. (United States) Camille Benjamin (semifinals)
4. (Netherlands) Marcella Mesker (first round)
5. (United States) Peanut Louie Harper (first round)
6. (Peru) Laura Gildemeister (quarterfinals)
7. (United States) Terry Phelps (first round)
8. (United States) Kim Sands (second round)

== Draw ==
=== Key ===
- Q = Qualifier
- WC = Wild card
- LL = Lucky loser
- Alt = Alternate
- SE = Special exempt
- PR = Protected ranking
- ITF = ITF entry
- JE = Junior exempt
- w/o = Walkover
- r = Retired
- d = Defaulted
- SR = Special ranking

=== Finals ===
Semifinals
1	(United States) Beth Herr	4	6	6
3	(United States) Camille Benjamin	6	2	2
Q	(United Kingdom) Amanda Brown	3	1
Q	(Sweden) Catarina Lindqvist	6	6

Final
1	(United States) Beth Herr	4	0
Q	(Sweden) Catarina Lindqvist	6	6

=== Top half ===
First round
1	(United States) B Herr	5	6	6
(Sweden) C Jexell	7	2	3
(United States) F Raschiatore	2	4
(United States) C Reynolds	6	6
(United States) K Keil	6	4	6
(Italy) S Simmonds	2	6	4
(United States) S Acker	4	7	6
8	(United States) K Sands	6	6	7
3	(United States) C Benjamin	7	6
(United States) B Gerken	6	3
(France) MC Calleja	6	6
(United States) G Fernández	3	4
Q	(France) N Herreman	4	6
(United States) S Rehe	6	7
(France) P Paradis-Mangon	5	6	6
6	(Peru) L Gildemeister	7	4	7

Second round
1	(United States) B Herr	6	6
(United States) C Reynolds	3	3
(United States) K Keil	6	7
8	(United States) K Sands	4	5
3	(United States) C Benjamin	6	6
(France) MC Calleja	3	3
(United States) S Rehe	7	0	3
6	(Peru) L Gildemeister	6	6	6

Quarterfinals
1	(United States) B Herr	6	7
(United States) K Keil	1	5
3	(United States) C Benjamin	2	6	6
6	(Peru) L Gildemeister	6	2	4

Semifinals
1	(United States) B Herr	4	6	6
3	(United States) C Benjamin	6	2	2

=== Bottom half ===
First round
5	(United States) P Louie Harper	4	5
(United States) P Smith	6	7
(Romania) L Romanov	1	1
(Australia) A Minter	6	6
Q	(United Kingdom) A Brown	7	2	7
(Brazil) C Monteiro	6	6	5
(France) C Vanier	6	6
4	(Netherlands) M Mesker	2	4
7	(United States) T Phelps	2	2
Q	(United States) M Van Nostrand	6	6
(United States) K Latham	5	2
Q	(Sweden) C Lindqvist	7	6
(Czechoslovakia) K Böhmová	7	6
(United States) T Lewis	6	4
(United States) ML Daniels	7	5	7
2	(United States) A Leand	6	7	5

Second round
(United States) P Smith	6	1
(Australia) A Minter	7	6
Q	(United Kingdom) A Brown	6	2	6
(France) C Vanier	2	6	3
Q	(United States) M Van Nostrand	3	6
Q	(Sweden) C Lindqvist	6	7
(Czechoslovakia) K Böhmová	5	3
(United States) ML Daniels	7	6

Quarterfinals
(Australia) A Minter	6	6	6
Q	(United Kingdom) A Brown	0	7	7
Q	(Sweden) C Lindqvist	6	6
(United States) ML Daniels	3	1

Semifinals
Q	(United Kingdom) A Brown	3	1
Q	(Sweden) C Lindqvist	6	6
