= Steve Kennedy (tennis) =

American pickleball instructor and tennis player

- Country (sports): United States
- Born: October 30, 1965 (age 60) Fort Lauderdale, Florida
- Height: 6 ft 0 in (183 cm)
- Plays: Right-handed

Singles
- Career record: 0–1
- Highest ranking: No. 208 (Oct 5, 1987)

Grand Slam singles results
- US Open: 1R (1987)

Steve Kennedy (born October 30, 1965) is an American pickleball instructor and former professional tennis player.

Born in Fort Lauderdale, Kennedy played collegiate tennis for Lander University and was named the 1985 NAIA Rookie of the Year. He had a best ranking in professional tennis of 208 in the world and qualified for the main draw of the 1987 US Open, where he lost his first round match in four sets to Eric Winogradsky.
