= Wayne Hearn =

American tennis player

- Country (sports): United States
- Born: August 5, 1962 (age 63) Charlotte, North Carolina, U.S.
- Height: 6 ft 2 in (188 cm)

Singles
- Career record: 1–1
- Highest ranking: No. 247 (Nov 30, 1987)

Grand Slam singles results
- Wimbledon: Q1 (1988)
- US Open: 2R (1987)

Doubles
- Highest ranking: No. 423 (Nov 30, 1987)

Wayne Hearn (born August 5, 1962) is an American former professional tennis player.

Born in Charlotte, North Carolina, Hearn won the North Carolina state championship in 1980 at South Mecklenburg High School. He played two seasons of collegiate tennis for the University of North Carolina. He won an ACC championship in 1984 at No. 2 singles and was ACC Player of the Year in 1985.

Hearn competed on the professional tour in the late 1980s and had a best world ranking of 247. He qualified for the main draw of the 1987 US Open and upset world number 33 Ulf Stenlund in the first round, then fell in the second round to Jimmy Connors.
