= 1984 Virginia Slims of Pennsylvania =

- Date: January 9–15
- Edition: 2nd
- Category: Ginny Circuit
- Draw: 32S / 16D
- Prize money: $50,000
- Surface: Carpet / indoor
- Location: Hershey, Pennsylvania, U.S.
- Venue: Hershey Racquet Club

Champions

Singles
- (Sweden) Catarina Lindqvist

Doubles
- (Czechoslovakia) Marcela Skuherská (Czechoslovakia) Kateřina Böhmová
← 1983 ·	Virginia Slims of Pennsylvania	· 1985 →

The 1984 Virginia Slims of Pennsylvania, also known as the Ginny of Central Pennsylvania, was a women's tennis tournament played on women's indoor carpet courts at the Hershey Racquet Club in Hershey, Pennsylvania in the United States that was part of the Ginny Tournament Circuit (Note: The 1984 Ginny Tournament Circuit consisted of eight $50,000 events played between February and September, followed by a $100,000 Ginny Championships in January 1985. All tournaments were held in the United States.) of the 1984 Virginia Slims World Championship Series. The tournament was held from January 9 through January 15, 1984. Unseeded Catarina Lindqvist won the singles title.

== Finals ==
=== Singles ===
(Sweden) Catarina Lindqvist defeated (United States) Beth Herr 6–4, 6–0

- It was Lindqvist's 1st singles career title.

=== Doubles ===
(Czechoslovakia) Marcela Skuherská / (Czechoslovakia) Kateřina Böhmová defeated (United States) Ann Henricksson / (United States) Nancy Yeargin 6–1, 6–3

- It was Skuherská's only career title. It was Böhmová's first title of the year and the second of her career.
