= 1987 US Open – Women's doubles =

Women's doubles
- 1987 US Open

Final
- Champions: (United States) Martina Navratilova (United States) Pam Shriver
- Runners-up: (United States) Kathy Jordan (Australia) Elizabeth Smylie
- Score: 5–7, 6–4, 6–2

Details
- Draw: 64
- Seeds: 16

Events
Singles	men	women		boys	girls
Doubles	men	women	mixed	boys	girls
WC Singles	men	women	quad
WC Doubles	men	women	quad
Legends	men	women	mixed
← 1986 ·	US Open	· 1988 →

Martina Navratilova and Pam Shriver were the defending champions and won in the final 5–7, 6–4, 6–2 against Kathy Jordan and Elizabeth Smylie.

== Seeds ==
Champion seeds are indicated in bold text while text in italics indicates the round in which those seeds were eliminated.

1. (United States) **Martina Navratilova** / (United States) **Pam Shriver (champions)**
2. (West Germany) Claudia Kohde-Kilsch / (Czechoslovakia) Helena Suková (quarterfinals)
3. (West Germany) Steffi Graf / (Argentina) Gabriela Sabatini (semifinals)
4. (Czechoslovakia) Hana Mandlíková / (Australia) Wendy Turnbull (third round)
5. (United States) Kathy Jordan / (Australia) Elizabeth Smylie (final)
6. (United States) Zina Garrison / (United States) Lori McNeil (quarterfinals)
7. (United States) Elise Burgin / (United States) Robin White (quarterfinals)
8. (United Kingdom) Anne Hobbs / (United States) Betsy Nagelsen (semifinals)
9. (Argentina) Mercedes Paz / (West Germany) Eva Pfaff (second round)
10. (West Germany) Bettina Bunge / (Peru) Laura Gildemeister (third round)
11. (United States) Chris Evert / (United States) Gigi Fernández (third round)
12. (Sweden) Catarina Lindqvist / (Denmark) Tine Scheuer-Larsen (first round)
13. (South Africa) Rosalyn Fairbank / (United States) Barbara Potter (second round)
14. (United States) Mary-Lou Piatek / (United States) Anne White (third round)
15. (Czechoslovakia) Jana Novotná / (France) Catherine Suire (third round)
16. (United States) Sandy Collins / (France) Catherine Tanvier (first round)

== Draw ==
=== Key ===
- Q = Qualifier
- WC = Wild card
- LL = Lucky loser
- Alt = Alternate
- SE = Special exempt
- PR = Protected ranking
- ITF = ITF entry
- JE = Junior exempt
- w/o = Walkover
- r = Retired
- d = Defaulted
- SR = Special ranking

=== Finals ===
Semifinals
1	(United States) Martina Navratilova (United States) Pam Shriver	w/o
3	(West Germany) Steffi Graf (Argentina) Gabriela Sabatini
5	(United States) Kathy Jordan (Australia) Elizabeth Smylie	6	6
8	(United Kingdom) Anne Hobbs (United States) Betsy Nagelsen	3	4

Final
1	(United States) Martina Navratilova (United States) Pam Shriver	5	6	6
5	(United States) Kathy Jordan (Australia) Elizabeth Smylie	7	4	2

=== Top half ===
==== Section 1 ====
First round
1	(United States) M Navratilova (United States) P Shriver	6	6
(Soviet Union) L Savchenko (Soviet Union) N Zvereva	1	3
(Canada) J Hetherington (United States) C Reynolds	2	2
(Brazil) N Dias (Argentina) A Villagrán	6	6
(United States) J Kaplan (South Africa) D van Rensburg	6	6
(Czechoslovakia) I Budařová (West Germany) C Porwik	3	3
(United States) P Barg (United States) J Russell	1	0
11	(United States) C Evert (United States) G Fernández	6	6
9	(Argentina) M Paz (West Germany) E Pfaff	6	6
(United States) S Hahn (United States) R Reis	4	3
(Australia) D Balestrat (United States) H Na	6	5	6
(United States) P Harper (United States) H Ludloff	3	7	3
(West Germany) I Cueto (Spain) A Sánchez	6	6
(France) I Demongeot (France) N Tauziat	4	2
(Poland) I Kuczyńska (Brazil) P Medrado	5	6	6^{5}
7	(United States) E Burgin (United States) R White	7	4	7^{7}

Second round
1	(United States) M Navratilova (United States) P Shriver	6	6
(Brazil) N Dias (Argentina) A Villagrán	1	2
(United States) J Kaplan (South Africa) D van Rensburg	3	2
11	(United States) C Evert (United States) G Fernández	6	6
9	(Argentina) M Paz (West Germany) E Pfaff	5	4
(Australia) D Fromholtz (United States) H Na	7	6
(West Germany) I Cueto (Spain) A Sánchez	1	1
7	(United States) E Burgin (United States) R White	6	6

Third round
1	(United States) M Navratilova (United States) P Shriver	6	6
11	(United States) C Evert (United States) G Fernández	0	1
(Australia) D Balestrat (United States) H Na	2	2
7	(United States) E Burgin (United States) R White	6	6

Quarterfinals
1	(United States) M Navratilova (United States) P Shriver	6	6
7	(United States) E Burgin (United States) R White	1	3

==== Section 2 ====
First round
3	(West Germany) S Graf (Argentina) G Sabatini	6	6
(Australia) L Field (Australia) E Minter	0	3
(Hong Kong) P Hy (Japan) E Inoue	6^{4}	6	4
(United States) A Henricksson (United States) M Van Nostrand	7^{7}	3	6
(United States) B Bowes (United States) B Gadusek	5	4
(United States) T Phelps (Italy) R Reggi	7	6
(United States) B Gerken (United States) E Hakami	3	6	6
16	(United States) S Collins (France) C Tanvier	6	1	2
14	(United States) M-L Piatek (United States) A White	3	7^{7}	6
(United States) A M Fernandez (New Zealand) J Richardson	6	6^{3}	3
(United States) M J Fernández (Argentina) P Tarabini	7	6
(France) S Amiach (France) N Herreman	5	4
(United States) K Foxworth (United States) K Sands	2	4
(New Zealand) B Cordwell (Australia) A Minter	6	6
(United States) M Gurney (Canada) H Kelesi	1	2
6	(United States) Z Garrison (United States) L McNeil	6	6

Second round
3	(West Germany) S Graf (Argentina) G Sabatini	6	6
(United States) A Henricksson (United States) M Van Nostrand	3	2
(United States) T Phelps (Italy) R Reggi	6	6
(United States) B Gerken (United States) E Hakami	1	2
14	(United States) M-L Piatek (United States) A White	6	6
(United States) M J Fernández (Argentina) P Tarabini	1	4
(New Zealand) B Cordwell (Australia) A Minter	2	7	3
6	(United States) Z Garrison (United States) L McNeil	6	5	6

Third round
3	(West Germany) S Graf (Argentina) G Sabatini	6	6
(United States) T Phelps (Italy) R Reggi	0	3
14	(United States) M-L Piatek (United States) A White	4	4
6	(United States) Z Garrison (United States) L McNeil	6	6

Quarterfinals
3	(West Germany) S Graf (Argentina) G Sabatini	6	5	6
6	(United States) Z Garrison (United States) L McNeil	4	7	4

=== Bottom half ===
==== Section 3 ====
First round
5	(United States) K Jordan (Australia) E Smylie	7	6
(United States) B Herr (United States) A Moulton	5	2
(South Africa) E Reinach (South Africa) M Reinach	7^{7}	6
(United States) T Holladay (United States) P Smith	6^{5}	2
(United States) K Horvath (Netherlands) M Mesker	2	7	2
(Soviet Union) N Bykova (Soviet Union) S Parkhomenko	6	5	6
(Italy) S Cecchini (Socialist Federal Republic of Yugoslavia) S Goleš	6^{2}	3
13	(South Africa) R Fairbank (United States) B Potter	7^{7}	6
12	(Sweden) C Lindqvist (Denmark) T Scheuer-Larsen	2	6	5
(United Kingdom) J Durie (United States) S Walsh-Pete	6	3	7
(United States) G Magers (United States) W White	6	7^{7}
(United States) L Allen (United States) C Benjamin	3	6^{4}
(Czechoslovakia) K Bohmova (Australia) N Provis	4	6	6
(United States) A Frazier (United States) S McCarthy	6	1	1
(Bulgaria) K Maleeva (Bulgaria) Mn Maleeva	4	3
4	(Czechoslovakia) H Mandlíková (Australia) W Turnbull	6	6

Second round
5	(United States) K Jordan (Australia) E Smylie	6	6
(South Africa) E Reinach (South Africa) M Reinach	3	0
(Soviet Union) N Bykova (Soviet Union) S Parkhomenko	7^{7}	6
13	(South Africa) R Fairbank (United States) B Potter	6^{5}	4
(United Kingdom) J Durie (United States) S Walsh-Pete	7^{8}	3	6
(United States) G Magers (United States) W White	6^{6}	6	4
(Czechoslovakia) K Bohmova (Australia) N Provis	6	6^{3}	2
4	(Czechoslovakia) H Mandlíková (Australia) W Turnbull	3	7^{7}	6

Third round
5	(United States) K Jordan (Australia) E Smylie	3	6	6
(Soviet Union) N Bykova (Soviet Union) S Parkhomenko	6	3	1
(United Kingdom) J Durie (United States) S Walsh-Pete	6	7
4	(Czechoslovakia) H Mandlíková (Australia) W Turnbull	2	5

Quarterfinals
5	(United States) K Jordan (Australia) E Smylie	6	6
(United Kingdom) J Durie (United States) S Walsh-Pete	1	4

==== Section 4 ====
First round
8	(United Kingdom) A Hobbs (United States) B Nagelsen	1	6	7^{7}
(United States) P Casale (United States) S Mascarin	6	3	6^{5}
(Argentina) G Mosca (United States) E Raponi-Longo	6	6^{5}	7^{7}
(United States) H Crowe (United States) K Steinmetz	4	7^{7}	6^{5}
(Australia) J Byrne (United States) P Fendick	3	6	6
(South Africa) K Schimper (Japan) M Yanagi	6	2	1
(United States) D-A Hansel (Australia) S Leo	3	3
10	(West Germany) B Bunge (Peru) L Gildemeister	6	6
15	(Czechoslovakia) J Novotná (France) C Suire	6	6
(United Kingdom) J Salmon (Netherlands) M van der Torre	3	3
(Czechoslovakia) R Maršíková (West Germany) S Meier	6	1	6^{4}
(United States) Ca MacGregor (United States) Cy MacGregor	3	6	7^{7}
(United States) L Antonoplis (Brazil) C Monteiro	7^{8}	6
(Argentina) B Fulco (Czechoslovakia) A Holíková	6^{6}	3
(United States) K Adams (United States) D Donnelly	1	1
2	(West Germany) C Kohde-Kilsch (Czechoslovakia) H Suková	6	6

Second round
8	(United Kingdom) A Hobbs (United States) B Nagelsen	6	6
(Argentina) G Mosca (United States) E Raponi-Longo	2	2
(Australia) J Byrne (United States) P Fendick	6	1	1
10	(West Germany) B Bunge (Peru) L Gildemeister	3	6	6
15	(Czechoslovakia) J Novotná (France) C Suire	6	6
(United States) Ca MacGregor (United States) Cy MacGregor	4	0
(United States) L Antonoplis (Brazil) C Monteiro	3	0
2	(West Germany) C Kohde-Kilsch (Czechoslovakia) H Suková	6	6

Third round
8	(United Kingdom) A Hobbs (United States) B Nagelsen	7	4	6
10	(West Germany) B Bunge (Peru) L Gildemeister	5	6	3
15	(Czechoslovakia) J Novotná (France) C Suire	3	3
2	(West Germany) C Kohde-Kilsch (Czechoslovakia) H Suková	6	6

Quarterfinals
8	(United Kingdom) A Hobbs (United States) B Nagelsen	3	6	6
2	(West Germany) C Kohde-Kilsch (Czechoslovakia) H Suková	6	3	4
