= 1984 Virginia Slims of Pennsylvania – Doubles =

Doubles
- 1984 Virginia Slims of Pennsylvania

Final
- Champions: (Czechoslovakia) Kateřina Böhmová (Czechoslovakia) Marcela Skuherská
- Runners-up: (United States) Ann Henricksson (United States) Nancy Yeargin
- Score: 6–1, 6–3

Details
- Draw: 16 (2Q)
- Seeds: 4

Events
Singles	Doubles
← 1983 ·	Virginia Slims of Pennsylvania	· 1985 →

Lea Antonoplis and Barbara Jordan were the defending champions, but lost in the first round to Kateřina Böhmová and Marcela Skuherská.

Böhmová and Skuherská won the title by defeating Ann Henricksson and Nancy Yeargin 6–1, 6–3 in the final.

== Seeds ==
1. (United States) Sherry Acker / (United States) Candy Reynolds (quarterfinals)
2. (United States) Lea Antonoplis / (United States) Barbara Jordan (first round)
3. (United States) Mary Lou Daniels / (United States) Paula Smith (first round)
4. (United States) Gigi Fernández / (United States) Beth Herr (first round)

== Draw ==
=== Key ===
- Q = Qualifier
- WC = Wild card
- LL = Lucky loser
- Alt = Alternate
- SE = Special exempt
- PR = Protected ranking
- ITF = ITF entry
- JE = Junior exempt
- w/o = Walkover
- r = Retired
- d = Defaulted
- SR = Special ranking

=== Draw ===
First round
1	(United States) S Acker (United States) C Reynolds	6	6
Q	(United States) T Lewis (United States) T Mochizuki	3	1
(United States) L McNeil (United States) B Norton	7	7
(Australia) A Minter (United States) F Raschiatore	6	5
4	(United States) G Fernández (United States) B Herr	4	6
(United States) A Henricksson (United States) N Yeargin	6	7
(Sweden) C Jexell (Netherlands) M Mesker	6	6	1
(Peru) L Gildemeister (United States) K Steinmetz	7	4	6
(United States) C Benjamin (France) C Vanier	7	6
Q	(United States) B Gerken (United States) R White	5	2
(United States) P Louie Harper (United States) K Sands	6	6
3	(United States) ML Daniels (United States) P Smith	4	2
(Socialist Federal Republic of Yugoslavia) S Goleš (Romania) L Romanov	0	3
(Argentina) E Raponi Longo (United States) V Nelson-Dunbar	6	6
(Czechoslovakia) K Böhmová (Czechoslovakia) M Skuherská	4	7	6
2	(United States) L Antonoplis (United States) B Jordan	6	6	3

Quarterfinals
1	(United States) S Acker (United States) C Reynolds	6	4	6
(United States) L McNeil (United States) B Norton	2	6	7
(United States) A Henricksson (United States) N Yeargin	6	6
(Peru) L Gildemeister (United States) K Steinmetz	4	3
(United States) C Benjamin (France) C Vanier	3	6	6
(United States) P Louie Harper (United States) K Sands	6	3	4
(Argentina) E Raponi Longo (United States) V Nelson-Dunbar	6	3
(Czechoslovakia) K Böhmová (Czechoslovakia) M Skuherská	7	6

Semifinals
(United States) L McNeil (United States) B Norton	4	4
(United States) A Henricksson (United States) N Yeargin	6	6
(United States) C Benjamin (France) C Vanier	2	6
(Czechoslovakia) K Böhmová (Czechoslovakia) M Skuherská	6	7

Final
(United States) A Henricksson (United States) N Yeargin	1	3
(Czechoslovakia) K Böhmová (Czechoslovakia) M Skuherská	6	6
