= 1983 Virginia Slims of Pennsylvania – Singles =

Singles
- 1983 Virginia Slims of Pennsylvania

Final
- Champion: (Canada) Carling Bassett
- Runner-up: (United States) Sandy Collins
- Score: 2–6, 6–0, 6–4

Details
- Draw: 32 (4 Q )
- Seeds: 8

Events
Singles	Doubles
Virginia Slims of Pennsylvania	· 1984 →

Unseeded Carling Bassett won in the final of the singles event at the 1983 Virginia Slims of Pennsylvania 2–6, 6–0, 6–4 against Sandy Collins.

== Seeds ==
A champion seed is indicated in bold text while text in italics indicates the round in which that seed was eliminated.

1. (United States) Susan Mascarin (second round)
2. (United States) Alycia Moulton (first round)
3. (United States) Kate Latham (first round)
4. (Romania) Lucia Romanov (first round)
5. (United States) Dana Gilbert (first round)
6. (Brazil) Patricia Medrado (first round)
7. (United States) Anne White (semifinals)
8. (United States) Peanut Louie (quarterfinals)

== Draw ==
=== Key ===
- Q = Qualifier
- WC = Wild card
- LL = Lucky loser
- Alt = Alternate
- SE = Special exempt
- PR = Protected ranking
- ITF = ITF entry
- JE = Junior exempt
- w/o = Walkover
- r = Retired
- d = Defaulted
- SR = Special ranking

First round
1	(United States) **S Mascarin**	**3**
(Switzerland) L Drescher	2	r
(United States) **S Collins**	**7**	**6**
Q	(Switzerland) C Jolissaint	6	2
LL	(United States) S Margolin	**6**	1	4
(United States) **B Hallquist**	4	**6**	**6**
Q	(Sweden) **C Jexell**	**6**	**6**
5	(United States) D Gilbert	0	0
4	(Romania) L Romanov	**6**	5	3
(Switzerland) **P Delhees**	4	**7**	**6**
(South Africa) S Rollinson	3	4
Q	(South Africa) **B Mould**	**6**	**6**
LL	(Sweden) **E Ekblom**	4	**6**	**6**
(United States) G Rush	**6**	3	1
(United States) B Nagelsen	1	4
7	(United States) **A White**	**6**	**6**
8	(United States) **P Louie**	**6**	**6**
(South Africa) J Mundel	2	2
LL	(Australia) A Minter	4	4
(Peru) **L Arraya**	**6**	**6**
(Brazil) C Monteiro	**6**	2	2
(Sweden) **C Lindqvist**	2	**6**	**6**
(United States) **J Harrington**	**6**	**6**
3	(United States) K Latham	2	2
6	(Brazil) P Medrado	2	6
(Canada) **C Bassett**	**6**	**7**
(United States) **A M Fernandez**	**6**	5	**6**
Q	(Sweden) L Sandin	4	**7**	4
(United States) **N Yeargin**	3	**6**	**6**
(Czechoslovakia) M Skuherská	**6**	2	4
(United States) **L Antonoplis**	**6**	**7**
2	(United States) A Moulton	4	5

Second round
1	(United States) S Mascarin	2	3
(United States) **S Collins**	**6**	**6**
(United States) B Hallquist	4	3
Q	(Sweden) **C Jexell**	**6**	**6**
(Switzerland) P Delhees	4	1
Q	(South Africa) **B Mould**	**6**	**6**
LL	(Sweden) E Ekblom	3	4
7	(United States) **A White**	**6**	**6**
8	(United States) **P Louie**	**7**	2	**7**
(Peru) L Arraya	6	**6**	5
(Sweden) C Lindqvist	2	2
(United States) **J Harrington**	**6**	**6**
(Canada) **C Bassett**	**6**	**6**
(United States) A-M Fernandez	0	2
(United States) N Yeargin	3	1
(United States) **L Antonoplis**	**6**	**6**

Quarterfinals
(United States) **S Collins**	**6**	**6**
Q	(Sweden) C Jexell	3	2
Q	(South Africa) B Mould	3	4
7	(United States) **A White**	**6**	**6**
8	(United States) P Louie	**6**	6	1
(United States) **J Harrington**	1	**7**	**6**
(Canada) **C Bassett**	**6**	**6**
(United States) L Antonoplis	4	1

Semifinals
(United States) **S Collins**	**7**	**7**
7	(United States) A White	5	5
(United States) J Harrington	1	4
(Canada) **C Bassett**	**6**	**6**

Final
(United States) Sandy Collins	**6**	0	4
(Canada) **Carling Bassett**	2	**6**	**6**
