= 1983 Virginia Slims of Pennsylvania – Doubles =

Doubles
- 1983 Virginia Slims of Pennsylvania

Final
- Champions: (United States) Lea Antonoplis (United States) Barbara Jordan
- Runners-up: (United States) Sherry Acker (United States) Ann Henricksson
- Score: 6–3, 6–4

Events
Singles	Doubles
← 1982 ·	Virginia Slims of Pennsylvania	· 1984 →

Lea Antonoplis and Barbara Jordan were the defending champions and won in the final 6–3, 6–4 against Sherry Acker and Ann Henricksson.

== Seeds ==
Champion seeds are indicated in bold text while text in italics indicates the round in which those seeds were eliminated.

1. (United States) **Lea Antonoplis** / (United States) **Barbara Jordan (champions)**
2. (Brazil) Patricia Medrado / (Brazil) Cláudia Monteiro (first round)
3. (United States) Alycia Moulton / (United States) Betsy Nagelsen (first round)
4. (United States) Susan Mascarin / (United States) Anne White (quarterfinals)

== Draw ==
=== Key ===
- Q = Qualifier
- WC = Wild card
- LL = Lucky loser
- Alt = Alternate
- SE = Special exempt
- PR = Protected ranking
- ITF = ITF entry
- JE = Junior exempt
- w/o = Walkover
- r = Retired
- d = Defaulted
- SR = Special ranking

First round
1	(United States) **L Antonoplis** (United States) **B Jordan**	**7**	1	**6**
(Australia) C O'Neil (Australia) P Whytcross	6	**6**	1
(United States) **K Latham** (Romania) **L Romanov**	**6**	**6**
(France) S Amiach (Spain) C Perea	3	4
3	(United States) A Moulton (United States) B Nagelsen	3	5
(Sweden) **E Ekblom** (Sweden) **L Sandin**	**6**	**7**
(South Africa) **B Mould** (Australia) **E Sayers**	6	**6**	**6**
(Switzerland) P Delhees (United States) N Yeargin	**7**	3	2
(Switzerland) **C Jolissaint** (Czechoslovakia) **M Skuherská**	**7**	**6**
(United States) J Goodling (Australia) B Remilton	6	4
(United States) S Collins (United States) B Lemberg	2	1
4	(United States) **S Mascarin** (United States) **A White**	**6**	**6**
(United States) **S Acker** (United States) **A Henricksson**	4	**6**	**6**
(Australia) S Leo (Australia) A Minter	**6**	1	1
(United States) **A M Fernandez** (United States) **B Hallquist**	6	**6**	**6**
2	(Brazil) P Medrado (Brazil) C Monteiro	**7**	2	4

Quarterfinals
1	(United States) **L Antonoplis** (United States) **B Jordan**	**6**	**6**
(United States) K Latham (Romania) L Romanov	3	2
(Sweden) E Ekblom (Sweden) L Sandin	4	4
(South Africa) **B Mould** (Australia) **E Sayers**	**6**	**6**
(Switzerland) **C Jolissaint** (Czechoslovakia) **M Skuherská**	**7**	**6**
4	(United States) S Mascarin (United States) A White	6	3
(United States) **S Acker** (United States) **A Henricksson**	3	**7**	**7**
(United States) A M Fernandez (United States) B Hallquist	**6**	5	6

Semifinals
1	(United States) **L Antonoplis** (United States) **B Jordan**	**6**	**6**
(South Africa) B Mould (Australia) E Sayers	4	2
(Switzerland) C Jolissaint (Czechoslovakia) M Skuherská	**6**	6	3
(United States) **S Acker** (United States) **A Henricksson**	4	**7**	**6**

Final
1	(United States) **Lea Antonoplis** (United States) **Barbara Jordan**	**6**	**6**
(United States) Sherry Acker (United States) Ann Henricksson	3	4
