= 1987 US Open – Men's singles =

Men's singles
- 1987 US Open

Final
- Champion: (Czechoslovakia) Ivan Lendl
- Runner-up: (Sweden) Mats Wilander
- Score: 6–7^{(7–9)}, 6–0, 7–6^{(7–4)}, 6–4

Details
- Draw: 128
- Seeds: 16

Events
Singles	men	women		boys	girls
Doubles	men	women	mixed	boys	girls
WC Singles	men	women	quad
WC Doubles	men	women	quad
Legends	men	women	mixed
- US Open

Two-time defending champion Ivan Lendl defeated Mats Wilander in the final, 6–7^{(7–9)}, 6–0, 7–6^{(7–4)}, 6–4 to win the men's singles tennis title at the 1987 US Open. It was his third US Open title and sixth major title overall. It was Lendl's third consecutive US Open title, following three consecutive runner-up finishes. Despite the final only going four sets, and one of those sets being 6–0, the match lasted 4 hours and 47 minutes, with Lendl saving multiple set points in the third set.

== Seeds ==
The seeded players are listed below. Ivan Lendl is the champion; others show the round in which they were eliminated.

1. (Czechoslovakia) Ivan Lendl (champion)
2. (Sweden) Stefan Edberg (semifinalist)
3. (Sweden) Mats Wilander (finalist)
4. (West Germany) Boris Becker (fourth round)
5. (Czechoslovakia) Miloslav Mečíř (quarterfinalist)
6. (United States) Jimmy Connors (semifinalist)
7. (Australia) Pat Cash (first round)
8. (United States) John McEnroe (quarterfinalist)
9. (Ecuador) Andrés Gómez (fourth round)
10. (Sweden) Joakim Nyström (second round)
11. (France) Henri Leconte (fourth round)
12. (United States) Tim Mayotte (second round)
13. (United States) Brad Gilbert (quarterfinalist)
14. (Spain) Emilio Sánchez (third round)
15. (Argentina) Martín Jaite (first round)
16. (Sweden) Anders Järryd (fourth round)

== Draw ==
=== Key ===
- Q = Qualifier
- WC = Wild card
- LL = Lucky loser
- r = Retired

=== Final eight ===
Quarterfinals
1	(Czechoslovakia) Ivan Lendl	6	6	6
8	(United States) John McEnroe	3	3	4
13	(United States) Brad Gilbert	6	3	4	0
6	(United States) Jimmy Connors	4	6	6	6
5	(Czechoslovakia) Miloslav Mečíř	3	7	4	6
3	(Sweden) Mats Wilander	6	6	6	7
(India) Ramesh Krishnan	2	2	2
2	(Sweden) Stefan Edberg	6	6	6

Semifinals
1	(Czechoslovakia) Ivan Lendl	6	6	6
6	(United States) Jimmy Connors	4	2	2
3	(Sweden) Mats Wilander	6	3	6	6
2	(Sweden) Stefan Edberg	4	6	3	4

Final
1	(Czechoslovakia) Ivan Lendl	6^{7}	6	7^{7}	6
3	(Sweden) Mats Wilander	7^{9}	0	6^{4}	4

=== Section 1 ===
First round
1	(Czechoslovakia) Lendl	6	6	6
(South Africa) Moir	0	0	0
(France) Fleurian	6	7	6
(Italy) Colombo	0	5	1
(Argentina) Yunis	3	2	2
(United States) Pugh	6	6	6
(West Germany) Osterthun	5	3	2
(South Africa) Muller	7	6	6
(South Africa) Visser	5	6	2	5
(United States) Freeman	7	4	6	7
(Italy) Pistolesi	4	2	3
(Israel) Mansdorf	6	6	6
(United States) Arias	6	7	2	6
(United States) Fleming	7	6	6	7
Q	(Chile) Acuña	3	4	4
16	(Sweden) Järryd	6	6	6

Second round
1	(Czechoslovakia) Lendl	6	6	6
(France) Fleurian	4	2	2
(United States) Pugh	7	6	6
(South Africa) Muller	5	3	4
(United States) Freeman	6	3	2	2
(Israel) Mansdorf	2	6	6	6
(United States) Fleming	3	4	2
16	(Sweden) Järryd	6	6	6

Third round
1	(Czechoslovakia) Lendl	6	6	6
(United States) Pugh	1	1	2
(Israel) Mansdorf	3	2	3
16	(Sweden) Järryd	6	6	6

Fourth round
1	(Czechoslovakia) Lendl	6	7^{7}	6
16	(Sweden) Järryd	2	6^{2}	4

=== Section 2 ===
First round
9	(Ecuador) Gómez	7	6	7
(Netherlands) Schapers	6	4	5
WC	(South Africa) Burrow	3	7	3	2
(Haiti) Agénor	6	6	6	6
(Mexico) Lozano	6	2	4
(Austria) Muster	7	6	6
(Sweden) Pernfors	3	0	r
(Sweden) Bergström	6	3
(Australia) Dyke	6	6	2	6
(United States) Purcell	4	3	6	2
(Socialist Federal Republic of Yugoslavia) Živojinović	6	6	6
(Switzerland) Mezzadri	3	0	4
(United States) Reneberg	6	6	6
(Austria) Antonitsch	3	2	2
(United States) Anger	3	2	2
8	(United States) McEnroe	6	6	6

Second round
9	(Ecuador) Gómez	6	6	4	7^{7}
(Haiti) Agénor	4	2	6	6^{3}
(Austria) Muster	6	6	6	6	6
(Sweden) Bergström	7	2	7	3	4
(Australia) Dyke	6	6	1	2	0
(Socialist Federal Republic of Yugoslavia) Živojinović	2	4	6	6	6
(United States) Reneberg	6^{3}	6	4	2
8	(United States) McEnroe	7^{7}	2	6	6

Third round
9	(Ecuador) Gómez	1	6	6	6	6
(Austria) Muster	6	7	3	3	3
(Socialist Federal Republic of Yugoslavia) Živojinović	4	7	7^{7}	4	3
8	(United States) McEnroe	6	5	6^{3}	6	6

Fourth round
9	(Ecuador) Gómez	4	6^{2}	3
8	(United States) McEnroe	6	7^{7}	6

=== Section 3 ===
First round
4	(West Germany) Becker	4	4	7	6	6
(United States) Wilkison	6	6	5	4	2
(United States) Holmes	5	4	0
(United States) Canter	7	6	6
(France) Tulasne	2	4	1
(United States) Brown	6	6	6
Q	(United Kingdom) Castle	7	1	2	7	6
(United States) Pate	5	6	6	6	4
(United States) Seguso	6	5	3	2
(France) Forget	3	7	6	6
(France) Benhabiles	6	3	6	6
WC	(United States) Parker	3	6	4	4
Q	(United States) Gurfein	6	3	2	2
(United States) Berger	4	6	6	6
(Australia) Doohan	1	2	2
13	(United States) Gilbert	6	6	6

Second round
4	(West Germany) Becker	6	6	7
(United States) Canter	4	2	6
(United States) Brown	6	1	3
Q	(United Kingdom) Castle	7	6	6
(France) Forget	7	4	4	6	6
(France) Benhabiles	6	6	6	3	4
(United States) Berger	6	2	4	3
13	(United States) Gilbert	4	6	6	6

Third round
4	(West Germany) Becker	6	5	6	7
Q	(United Kingdom) Castle	4	7	2	5
(France) Forget	4	7	5	4
13	(United States) Gilbert	6	6	7	6

Fourth round
4	(West Germany) Becker	6	7	6	5	1
13	(United States) Gilbert	2	6	7	7	6

=== Section 4 ===
First round
11	(France) Leconte	6	7	4	6
(United States) Agassi	4	6	6	3
Q	(Italy) Pozzi	6	6	6
Q	(Canada) Sznajder	3	1	2
WC	(United States) Nelson	6	6	6	5	3
(Nigeria) Odizor	2	2	7	7	6
WC	(United States) Chang	6	6	6	6
(Australia) McNamee	3	7	4	4
WC	(United States) Cannon	3	2	2
(United States) Grabb	6	6	6
Q	(The Bahamas) Smith	4	6	6	6
(Czechoslovakia) Vajda	6	2	2	4
Q	(United States) Hearn	4	7	6	6
(Sweden) Stenlund	6	6	2	4
WC	(United States) Rive	1	4	4
6	(United States) Connors	6	6	6

Second round
11	(France) Leconte	6	6	6
Q	(Italy) Pozzi	3	2	3
(Nigeria) Odizor	6	6	6	3	6
WC	(United States) Chang	1	2	7	6	4
(United States) Grabb	6	6	6
Q	(The Bahamas) Smith	0	1	3
Q	(United States) Hearn	3	2	1
6	(United States) Connors	6	6	6

Third round
11	(France) Leconte	6	6	6	6
(Nigeria) Odizor	7	2	1	2
(United States) Grabb	3	2	4
6	(United States) Connors	6	6	6

Fourth round
11	(France) Leconte	7^{7}	4	4	3
6	(United States) Connors	6^{0}	6	6	6

=== Section 5 ===
First round
5	(Czechoslovakia) Mečíř	6	6	7
(Czechoslovakia) Nováček	3	4	6
Q	(United States) Williamson	3	5	4
Q	(Australia) Fitzgerald	6	7	6
(Czechoslovakia) Navrátil	4	6	1	6	7
(United States) De Palmer	6	3	6	2	5
(Switzerland) Hlasek	3	6	2	6	6
(United States) Davis	6	3	6	4	4
Q	(United States) Bourne	7	6	3	2	7
Q	(Soviet Union) Volkov	5	2	6	6	5
(Czechoslovakia) Šrejber	6	7	7	7
(United States) Matuszewski	7	6	5	6
Q	(Australia) Woodforde	6	6	6
(United States) Scanlon	2	4	2
(United States) Giammalva Jr.	1	0	1
12	(United States) Mayotte	6	6	6

Second round
5	(Czechoslovakia) Mečíř	6	6	6
Q	(Australia) Fitzgerald	3	1	0
(Czechoslovakia) Navrátil	5	5	4
(Switzerland) Hlasek	7	7	6
Q	(United States) Bourne	6	6	7	5	3
(Czechoslovakia) Šrejber	7	3	6	7	6
Q	(Australia) Woodforde	7	7	3	2	7
12	(United States) Mayotte	6	6	6	6	6

Third round
5	(Czechoslovakia) Mečíř	6	6	2	6
(Switzerland) Hlasek	4	4	6	4
(Czechoslovakia) Šrejber	2	1	1
Q	(Australia) Woodforde	6	6	6

Fourth round
5	(Czechoslovakia) Mečíř	6	3	6	6
Q	(Australia) Woodforde	4	6	2	2

=== Section 6 ===
First round
14	(Spain) Sánchez	1	6	7	6
(Australia) Masur	6	4	6	3
Q	(United States) Wheaton	5	7	3	4
(United States) Witsken	7	5	6	6
Q	(Australia) Cahill	6	7	6
(United States) Kures	2	5	4
(United States) Duncan	2	6	0
WC	(United States) Flach	6	7	6
(United States) Teltscher	5	3	6	6
(Czechoslovakia) Pimek	7	6	1	7
(France) Winogradsky	6	7	2	7
Q	(United States) Kennedy	4	5	6	6
(Sweden) Carlsson	6	6	6
(United States) Jones	2	1	3
Q	(United States) Ross	1	1	1
3	(Sweden) Wilander	6	6	6

Second round
14	(Spain) Sánchez	6	6	6
(United States) Witsken	1	4	3
Q	(Australia) Cahill	6	4	6	1	6
WC	(United States) Flach	1	6	3	6	7
(Czechoslovakia) Pimek	6	6	6
(France) Winogradsky	4	0	4
(Sweden) Carlsson	2	3	1
3	(Sweden) Wilander	6	6	6

Third round
14	(Spain) Sánchez	7	6	6	5
WC	(United States) Flach	5	7	7	7
(Czechoslovakia) Pimek	2	0	1
3	(Sweden) Wilander	6	6	6

Fourth round
WC	(United States) Flach	3	3	6
3	(Sweden) Wilander	6	6	7

=== Section 7 ===
First round
7	(Australia) Cash	4	6	4	4
(Sweden) Lundgren	6	4	6	6
LL	(United States) Hooper	4	1	4
(Soviet Union) Chesnokov	6	6	6
(Spain) Casal	6	1	7	4	4
(Uruguay) Pérez	1	6	5	6	6
(West Germany) Jelen	6	6	6
(Socialist Federal Republic of Yugoslavia) Orešar	3	2	4
(United States) Testerman	6	3	1
WC	(United States) Leach	7	6	6
(United States) Kriek	6	6	6
(Australia) Drewett	1	2	1
(United States) Annacone	0	5	1
(India) Krishnan	6	7	6
(Spain) Sánchez	6	6	6	3
10	(Sweden) Nyström	7	7	3	6

Second round
(Sweden) Lundgren	2	5	6	0
(Soviet Union) Chesnokov	6	7	2	6
(Uruguay) Pérez	2	6	6	6
(West Germany) Jelen	6	2	4	3
WC	(United States) Leach	3	6	6	3
(United States) Kriek	6	7	3	6
(India) Krishnan	6	7	6
10	(Sweden) Nyström	4	5	2

Third round
(Soviet Union) Chesnokov	6	6	6
(Uruguay) Pérez	1	2	2
(United States) Kriek	3	4	3
(India) Krishnan	6	6	6

Fourth round
(Soviet Union) Chesnokov	4	1	2
(India) Krishnan	6	6	6

=== Section 8 ===
First round
15	(Argentina) Jaite	6	4	2
(Czechoslovakia) Šmid	7	6	6
(Sweden) Högstedt	3	2	6
(Peru) Yzaga	6	6	7
(United States) Donnelly	4	6	7	6	6
(Australia) Limberger	6	7	5	4	4
(Sweden) Svensson	5	6	6	7
(Italy) Canè	7	4	2	6
(West Germany) Saceanu	6	1	5	7	4
(United States) Flur	0	6	7	6	6
(New Zealand) Evernden	6	6	7
(Sweden) Sundström	2	2	6
(United States) Goldie	3	6	7	6	6
(South Africa) Steyn	6	3	5	7	2
(United States) Rostagno	3	6	2
2	(Sweden) Edberg	6	7	6

Second round
(Czechoslovakia) Šmid	3	4	1
(Peru) Yzaga	6	6	6
(United States) Donnelly	4	6	6	2	6
(Sweden) Svensson	6	4	3	6	7
(United States) Flur	6	6	6	4	3
(New Zealand) Evernden	4	7	3	6	6
(United States) Goldie	7	4	2	4
2	(Sweden) Edberg	6	6	6	6

Third round
(Peru) Yzaga	6	4	6	2	2
(Sweden) Svensson	2	6	3	6	6
(New Zealand) Evernden	2	1	4
2	(Sweden) Edberg	6	6	6

Fourth round
(Sweden) Svensson	2	6	3
2	(Sweden) Edberg	6	7	6

Preceded by 1987 Wimbledon Championships – Men's singles	Grand Slam men's singles	Succeeded by 1988 Australian Open – Men's singles
