= 1983 Virginia Slims of Pennsylvania =

Women's tennis tournament

- Date: February 14 – 20
- Edition: 1st
- Category: Ginny Tournament Circuit
- Draw: 32S / 16D
- Prize money: $50,000
- Surface: Carpet / indoor
- Location: Hershey, Pennsylvania, U.S.
- Venue: Hershey Racquet Club

Champions

Singles
- (Canada) Carling Bassett

Doubles
- (United States) Lea Antonoplis / (United States) Barbara Jordan
Virginia Slims of Pennsylvania	· 1984 →

The 1983 Virginia Slims of Pennsylvania, also known as the Ginny of Central Pennsylvania, was a women's tennis tournament played on indoor carpet courts at the Hershey Racquet Club in Hershey, Pennsylvania in the United States that was part of the Ginny Tournament Circuit (Note: The 1983 Ginny Tournament Circuit consisted of eight $50,000 events played between February and September, followed by a $100,000 Ginny Championships in November. All tournaments were held in the United States.) of the 1983 Virginia Slims World Championship Series. It was the inaugural edition of the tournament and was held from February 14 through February 20, 1983. Carling Bassett won the singles title.

== Finals ==
=== Singles ===
(Canada) Carling Bassett defeated (United States) Sandy Collins 2–6, 6–0, 6–4

- It was Bassett's only title of the year and the 1st of her career.

=== Doubles ===
(United States) Lea Antonoplis / (United States) Barbara Jordan defeated (United States) Sherry Acker / (United States) Ann Henricksson 6–3, 6–4

- It was Antonoplis' 2nd title of the year and the 2nd of her career. It was Jordan's 2nd title of the year and the 4th of her career.
