= 1987 US Open – Women's singles =

Women's singles
- 1987 US Open

Final
- Champion: (United States) Martina Navratilova
- Runner-up: (West Germany) Steffi Graf
- Score: 7–6^{(7–4)}, 6–1

Details
- Draw: 128
- Seeds: 16

Events
Singles	men	women		boys	girls
Doubles	men	women	mixed	boys	girls
WC Singles	men	women	quad
WC Doubles	men	women	quad
Legends	men	women	mixed
← 1986 ·	US Open	· 1988 →

Defending champion Martina Navratilova defeated Steffi Graf in the final, 7–6^{(7–4)}, 6–1 to win the women's singles tennis title at the 1987 US Open. It was her fourth US Open singles title and 17th major singles title overall. Navratilova did not lose a set during the tournament.

Six-time champion Chris Evert lost in the quarterfinals to Lori McNeil. This marked the first time Evert lost before the semifinals at the US Open, ending a streak of 17 consecutive semifinals.

This was the first time since the 1980 US Open that neither Navratilova nor Evert were the top seed at a major, and correspondingly the first time Graf was seeded first at a major.

== Seeds ==
The seeded players are listed below. Martina Navratilova is the champion; others show the round in which they were eliminated.

1. (West Germany) Steffi Graf (finalist)
2. (United States) Martina Navratilova (champion)
3. (United States) Chris Evert (quarterfinalist)
4. (Czechoslovakia) Hana Mandlíková (fourth round)
5. (United States) Pam Shriver (quarterfinalist)
6. (Czechoslovakia) Helena Suková (semifinalist)
7. (United States) Zina Garrison (fourth round)
8. (Argentina) Gabriela Sabatini (quarterfinalist)
9. (West Germany) Claudia Kohde-Kilsch (quarterfinalist)
10. (Bulgaria) Manuela Maleeva-Fragnière (fourth round)
11. (United States) Lori McNeil (semifinalist)
12. (West Germany) Bettina Bunge (fourth round)
13. (West Germany) Sylvia Hanika (fourth round)
14. (Sweden) Catarina Lindqvist (fourth round)
15. (United States) Barbara Potter (first round)
16. (Australia) Wendy Turnbull (second round)

== Draw ==
=== Key ===
- Q = Qualifier
- WC = Wild card
- LL = Lucky loser
- r = Retired

=== Final eight ===
Quarterfinals
1	(West Germany) Steffi Graf	6	6
5	(United States) Pam Shriver	4	3
3	(United States) Chris Evert	6	2	4
11	(United States) Lori McNeil	3	6	6
6	(Czechoslovakia) Helena Suková	6	6
9	(West Germany) Claudia Kohde-Kilsch	1	3
8	(Argentina) Gabriela Sabatini	5	3
2	(United States) Martina Navratilova	7	6

Semifinals
1	(West Germany) Steffi Graf	4	6	6
11	(United States) Lori McNeil	6	2	4
6	(Czechoslovakia) Helena Suková	2	2
2	(United States) Martina Navratilova	6	6

Finals
1	(West Germany) Steffi Graf	6^{4}	1
2	(United States) Martina Navratilova	7^{7}	6

=== Earlier rounds ===
==== Section 1 ====
First round
1	(West Germany) Graf	6	6
(Argentina) Fulco	0	3
(Austria) Huber	6	6
Q	(United States) Macgregor	1	4
(Argentina) Tarabini	5	6	6
Q	(Brazil) Medrado	7	1	3
(South Africa) Fairbank	1	6	6
(United States) Gerken	6	4	2
(France) Demongeot	6	6
(Argentina) Pérez Roldán	2	2
(United States) Nagelsen	7^{7}	6
(France) Tanvier	6^{2}	1
(West Germany) Meier	7	6
(United States) Walsh-Pete	5	3
13	(West Germany) Hanika	6	6
(Japan) Okamoto	0	1

Second round
1	(West Germany) Graf	6	6
(Austria) Huber	2	3
(Argentina) Tarabini	6	4	6
(South Africa) Fairbank	2	6	3
(France) Demongeot	6	6
(United States) Nagelsen	4	1
(West Germany) Meier	3	0
13	(West Germany) Hanika	6	6

Third round
1	(West Germany) Graf	6	6
(Argentina) Tarabini	2	0
(France) Demongeot	4	2
13	(West Germany) Hanika	6	6

Fourth round
1	(West Germany) Graf	7	6
13	(West Germany) Hanika	5	2

==== Section 2 ====
First round
16	(Australia) Turnbull	6	6
(United States) Gadusek	2	1
(Czechoslovakia) Novotná	6	7^{7}
(Soviet Union) Parkhomenko	1	6^{1}
Q	(France) Halard	4	6	7
(Japan) Inoue	6	2	5
(Italy) Bonsignori	6	6
(Switzerland) Krapl	2	4
(Italy) Golarsa	7	0	6
(United States) Werdel	5	6	2
(Peru) Gildemeister	6	2	6
(Italy) Garrone	3	6	4
Q	(Poland) Kuczyńska	6	6
WC	(United States) Kim	4	1
5	(United States) Shriver	6	6
(United States) White	3	3

Second round
16	(Australia) Turnbull	2	4
(Czechoslovakia) Novotná	6	6
Q	(France) Halard	6	7^{7}
(Italy) Bonsignori	2	6^{1}
(Italy) Golarsa	7^{7}	6
(Peru) Gildemeister	6^{4}	4
Q	(Poland) Kuczyńska	3	2
5	(United States) Shriver	6	6

Third round
(Czechoslovakia) Novotná	6	6
Q	(France) Halard	4	0
(Italy) Golarsa	1	2
5	(United States) Shriver	6	6

Fourth round
(Czechoslovakia) Novotná	3	6^{4}
5	(United States) Shriver	6	7^{7}

==== Section 3 ====
First round
3	(United States) Evert	6	6
WC	(United States) Sloane	1	0
(Brazil) Dias	6	6
(Spain) Sánchez Vicario	4	2
(Soviet Union) Zvereva	6	6
(France) Paradis	3	3
(Australia) Smylie	6	7
(West Germany) Pfaff	4	5
(United States) M J Fernández	6	6
(Czechoslovakia) Maršíková	3	0
(Soviet Union) Savchenko	6	6
(United States) Horvath	3	4
(France) Tauziat	6	6
(United States) Ludloff	4	2
10	(Bulgaria) M Maleeva-Fragnière	7	6
(United States) Jordan	5	2

Second round
3	(United States) Evert	6	6
(Brazil) Dias	0	1
(Soviet Union) Zvereva	6	6
(Australia) Smylie	3	2
(United States) M J Fernández	6	6
(Soviet Union) Savchenko	1	4
(France) Tauziat	1	3
10	(Bulgaria) M Maleeva-Fragnière	6	6

Third round
3	(United States) Evert	6	6
(Soviet Union) Zvereva	0	2
(United States) M J Fernández	2	6	3
10	(Bulgaria) M Maleeva-Fragnière	6	0	6

Fourth round
3	(United States) Evert	7	6
10	(Bulgaria) M Maleeva-Fragnière	5	4

==== Section 4 ====
First round
11	(United States) McNeil	6	6
Q	(Czechoslovakia) Zrubáková	3	1
(United States) Benjamin	6	7
(United States) Torres	3	5
(Australia) Provis	4	7	6
(West Germany) Porwik	6	5	1
(United States) Keil	6	6
WC	(United States) Herr	3	1
(South Africa) Van Rensburg	6	6
(Argentina) Villagrán	2	0
(Bulgaria) K Maleeva	6	6
WC	(United States) Nelson-Dunbar	1	1
(United States) Phelps	6	6
(United States) Stafford	2	3
7	(United States) Garrison	6	6
(Denmark) Scheuer-Larsen	1	3

Second round
11	(United States) McNeil	6	6
(United States) Benjamin	4	2
(Australia) Provis	6	6
(United States) Keil	4	2
(South Africa) Van Rensburg	2	3
(Bulgaria) K Maleeva	6	6
(United States) Phelps	6^{2}	1
7	(United States) Garrison	7^{7}	6

Third round
11	(United States) McNeil	5	6	7^{7}
(Australia) Provis	7	1	6^{2}
(Bulgaria) K Maleeva	6^{4}	6^{8}
7	(United States) Garrison	7^{7}	7^{10}

Fourth round
11	(United States) McNeil	7^{7}	3	7^{8}
7	(United States) Garrison	6^{0}	6	6^{6}

==== Section 5 ====
First round
6	(Czechoslovakia) Suková	6^{2}	6	6
(United States) Gurney	7^{7}	3	4
(United States) Burgin	7	6
(United Kingdom) Javer	5	4
(West Germany) Cueto	1	7	7
(United States) Magers	6	5	5
(United States) Louie-Harper	6	6
(United States) Spence	4	1
(United Kingdom) Hobbs	6	7
(Australia) Minter	4	5
(United Kingdom) Croft	7	7
(Greece) Kanellopoulou	5	5
(Belgium) Devries	6	6
(United States) Van Nostrand	3	2
(Japan) Kijimuta	7	6
15	(United States) Potter	5	3

Second round
6	(Czechoslovakia) Suková	6	6
(United States) Burgin	3	4
(West Germany) Cueto	6	6
(United States) Louie-Harper	3	2
(United Kingdom) Hobbs	6	7^{7}
(United Kingdom) Croft	2	6^{3}
(Belgium) Devries	3	6	2
(Japan) Kijimuta	6	1	6

Third round
6	(Czechoslovakia) Suková	7^{11}	6
(West Germany) Cueto	6^{9}	1
(United Kingdom) Hobbs	6	2	6
(Japan) Kijimuta	4	6	4

Fourth round
6	(Czechoslovakia) Suková	6	6
(United Kingdom) Hobbs	4	2

==== Section 6 ====
First round
9	(West Germany) Kohde-Kilsch	6	7
(United States) Moulton	2	5
(Canada) Bassett	6	6
(Australia) Balestrat	4	2
(Hong Kong) Hy	4	6	6
(United States) Reis	6	4	2
(Italy) Cecchini	6	6
(United States) White	4	2
Q	(France) Derly	6	2	6
WC	(United States) Arendt	3	6	2
(Italy) Reggi	6	6
(United States) Grossman	4	0
(United Kingdom) Durie	6	2	6
(Australia) Minter	3	6	2
4	(Czechoslovakia) Mandlíková	6	6
(France) Herreman	1	3

Second round
9	(West Germany) Kohde-Kilsch	7^{7}	6
(Canada) Bassett	6^{2}	0
(Hong Kong) Hy	4	7	5
(Italy) Cecchini	6	5	7
Q	(France) Derly	2	6	2
(Italy) Reggi	6	4	6
(United Kingdom) Durie	3	7^{13}	2
4	(Czechoslovakia) Mandlíková	6	6^{11}	6

Third round
9	(West Germany) Kohde-Kilsch	6	6
(Italy) Cecchini	4	3
(Italy) Reggi	3	1
4	(Czechoslovakia) Mandlíková	6	6

Fourth round
9	(West Germany) Kohde-Kilsch	6^{4}	6	6
4	(Czechoslovakia) Mandlíková	7^{7}	4	1

==== Section 7 ====
First round
8	(Argentina) Sabatini	6	6
(United States) Bowes	3	3
(United Kingdom) Gomer	6	6
Q	(West Germany) Probst	3	0
(Argentina) Paz	6	6
(United States) G Fernández	4	2
(United States) Hakami	6	6
(United States) Cioffi	1	1
(South Africa) Schimper	6	6
(United States) Russell	2	3
(United States) Henricksson	7^{9}	6
(Austria) Wiesner	6^{7}	2
(United States) Fendick	6	2	6
(Australia) Field	3	6	0
12	(West Germany) Bunge	6	7
(United States) Piatek	3	5

Second round
8	(Argentina) Sabatini	6	6
(United Kingdom) Gomer	3	1
(Argentina) Paz	2	4
(United States) Hakami	6	6
(South Africa) Schimper	4	7	4
(United States) Henricksson	6	5	6
(United States) Fendick	2	4
12	(West Germany) Bunge	6	6

Third round
8	(Argentina) Sabatini	6	6
(United States) Hakami	1	3
(United States) Henricksson	3	4
12	(West Germany) Bunge	6	6

Fourth round
8	(Argentina) Sabatini	1	6	6
12	(West Germany) Bunge	6	1	1

==== Section 8 ====
First round
14	(Sweden) Lindqvist	6	6
WC	(United States) Frazier	2	2
(Socialist Federal Republic of Yugoslavia) Goleš	7^{7}	6
Q	(Netherlands) Schultz	6^{2}	3
(South Africa) Reinach	6	6
(United States) Na	1	0
(Canada) Kelesi	7^{7}	7
(Soviet Union) Bykova	6^{4}	5
(United States) Casale	7	6
(Czechoslovakia) Budařová	5	2
(United States) Bonder	6	7
WC	(United States) Santrock	4	5
(United States) White	7	7
WC	(United States) Mochizuki	5	5
(United States) Gompert	1	1
2	(United States) Navratilova	6	6

Second round
14	(Sweden) Lindqvist	6	6
(Socialist Federal Republic of Yugoslavia) Goleš	2	0
(South Africa) Reinach	6	1	4
(Canada) Kelesi	4	6	6
(United States) Casale	4	1
(United States) Bonder	6	6
(United States) White	1	3
2	(United States) Navratilova	6	6

Third round
14	(Sweden) Lindqvist	4	7	6
(Canada) Kelesi	6	5	4
(United States) Bonder	2	1
2	(United States) Navratilova	6	6

Fourth round
14	(Sweden) Lindqvist	0	4
2	(United States) Navratilova	6	6

Preceded by 1987 Wimbledon Championships – Women's singles	Grand Slam women's singles	Succeeded by 1988 Australian Open – Women's singles
