= 1987 US Open – Mixed doubles =

Mixed doubles
- 1987 US Open

Final
- Champions: (United States) Martina Navratilova (Spain) Emilio Sánchez
- Runners-up: (United States) Betsy Nagelsen (United States) Paul Annacone
- Score: 6–4, 6–7^{(6–8)}, 7–6^{(14–12)}

Details
- Draw: 32
- Seeds: 8

Events
Singles	men	women		boys	girls
Doubles	men	women	mixed	boys	girls
WC Singles	men	women	quad
WC Doubles	men	women	quad
Legends	men	women	mixed
- US Open

Raffaella Reggi and Sergio Casal were the defending champions but did not turn up in the semifinals to play Martina Navratilova and Emilio Sánchez.

Navratilova and Sánchez won in the final 6–4, 6–7^{(6–8)}, 7–6^{(14–12)} against Betsy Nagelsen and Paul Annacone. With this win, Navratilova became only the 2nd woman in the open era after Billie Jean King to win the 'Triple Crown' i.e. Winning the singles, doubles and mixed doubles title at the same event.

== Seeds ==
Champion seeds are indicated in bold text while text in italics indicates the round in which those seeds were eliminated.

1. (United States) **Martina Navratilova** / (Spain) **Emilio Sánchez (champions)**
2. (United States) Betsy Nagelsen / (United States) Paul Annacone (final)
3. (United States) Kathy Jordan / (United States) Ken Flach (second round)
4. (United States) Elise Burgin / (United States) Blaine Willenborg (second round)
5. (Australia) Elizabeth Smylie / (Australia) John Fitzgerald (second round)
6. (United States) Zina Garrison / (United States) Sherwood Stewart (semifinals)
7. n/a
8. (Denmark) Tine Scheuer-Larsen / (Denmark) Michael Mortensen (first round)

== Draw ==
Key

- Q = Qualifier
- WC = Wild card
- LL = Lucky loser
- Alt = Alternate
- ITF = ITF entry
- PR = Protected ranking
- SR = Special ranking
- SE = Special exempt
- JE = Junior exempt
- JR = Junior Accelerator Programme entrant
- CO = College Accelerator Programme entrant
- NG = Next Gen Accelerator Program entrant
- w/o = Walkover
- r = Retired
- d = Defaulted

=== Final ===
Final
1	(United States) **Martina Navratilova** (Spain) **Emilio Sánchez**	**6**	6^{6}	**7^{14}**
2	(United States) Betsy Nagelsen (United States) Paul Annacone	4	**7^{8}**	6^{12}

=== Top half ===
First round
1	(United States) **M Navratilova** (Spain) **E Sánchez**	**6**	**6**
(United States) R White (United States) R Leach	2	2
(United States) **A White** (United States) **K Jones**	**7**	**6**
(South Africa) R Fairbank (South Africa) C Steyn	5	4
(United States) **A Henricksson** (Netherlands) **M Schapers**	**6**	**6**
(United Kingdom) A Hobbs (United States) M Dickson	1	3
(France) **C Suire** (Iran) **M Bahrami**	**7**	**6**
ALT	(Canada) J Hetherington (United States) R Baxter	5	2
4	(United States) **E Burgin** (United States) **B Willenborg**	**6**	**6**
(Australia) W Turnbull (United Kingdom) J Lloyd	4	4
(United States) H Ludloff (United States) L Scott	6	4
(Italy) **R Reggi** (Spain) **S Casal**	**7**	**6**
(Australia) **J Byrne** (Australia) **K Warwick**	**6**	**6**
(United States) M L Piatek (United States) R Van't Hof	4	4
(United States) S Collins (United States) M Leach	2	1
5	(Australia) **E Smylie** (Australia) **J Fitzgerald**	**6**	**6**

Second round
1	(United States) **M Navratilova** (Spain) **E Sánchez**	**6**	**6**
(United States) A White (United States) K Jones	3	2
(United States) **A Henricksson** (Netherlands) **M Schapers**	**6**	3	**6**
(France) C Suire (Iran) M Bahrami	3	**6**	1
4	(United States) E Burgin (United States) B Willenborg
(Italy) **R Reggi** (Spain) **S Casal**	w/o
(Australia) **J Byrne** (Australia) **K Warwick**	**7**	**7**
5	(Australia) E Smylie (Australia) J Fitzgerald	6	6

Quarterfinals
1	(United States) **M Navratilova** (Spain) **E Sánchez**	2	**6**	**6**
(United States) A Henricksson (Netherlands) M Schapers	**6**	2	2
(Italy) **R Reggi** (Spain) **S Casal**	**6**	**6**
(Australia) J Byrne (Australia) K Warwick	1	3

Semifinals
1	(United States) **M Navratilova** (Spain) **E Sánchez**	w/o
(Italy) R Reggi (Spain) S Casal

=== Bottom half ===
First round
6	(United States) **Z Garrison** (United States) **S Stewart**	**6**	6	**6**
(West Germany) B Bunge (United States) D Stockton	4	**7**	4
(United States) B Bowes (United States) D Ralston	2	0
(Argentina) **M Paz** (Paraguay) **F González**	**6**	**6**
(United States) P Smith (United States) M Purcell	6	1
(United States) **T Phelps** (United States) **J Pugh**	**7**	**6**
(United States) B Herr (United States) T Pawsat	**6**	5	1
3	(United States) **K Jordan** (United States) **K Flach**	4	**7**	**6**
8	(Denmark) T Scheuer-Larsen (Denmark) M Mortensen	6	**7**	4
(Australia) **L Field** (Australia) **M Woodforde**	**7**	5	**6**
(United States) **P Fendick** (United States) **A Kohlberg**	**6**	**6**
(United States) P Louie-Harper (United States) M Riessen	0	2
(United States) **L McNeil** (United States) **D Goldie**	**6**	**7**
(Australia) D Balestrat (Australia) P Doohan	4	5
(United States) A M Fernandez (United States) L Bourne	3	**7**	4
2	(United States) **B Nagelsen** (United States) **P Annacone**	**6**	6	**6**

Second round
6	(United States) **Z Garrison** (United States) **S Stewart**	**7**	**7**
(Argentina) M Paz (Paraguay) F González	5	6
(United States) **T Phelps** (United States) **J Pugh**	4	**6**	**7**
3	(United States) K Jordan (United States) K Flach	**6**	4	5
(Australia) L Field (Australia) M Woodforde	**6**	4	2
(United States) **P Fendick** (United States) **A Kohlberg**	3	**6**	**6**
(United States) L McNeil (United States) D Goldie	4	4
2	(United States) **B Nagelsen** (United States) **P Annacone**	**6**	**6**

Quarterfinals
6	(United States) **Z Garrison** (United States) **S Stewart**	**6**	**6**
(United States) T Phelps (United States) J Pugh	4	3
(United States) P Fendick (United States) A Kohlberg	5	4
2	(United States) **B Nagelsen** (United States) **P Annacone**	**7**	**6**

Semifinals
6	(United States) Z Garrison (United States) S Stewart	4	4
2	(United States) **B Nagelsen** (United States) **P Annacone**	**6**	**6**
