= 1987 US Open – Men's doubles =

Tennis competition

Men's doubles
- 1987 US Open

Final
- Champion: (Sweden) Stefan Edberg (Sweden) Anders Järryd
- Runner-up: (United States) Ken Flach (United States) Robert Seguso
- Score: 7–6^{(7–1)}, 6–2, 4–6, 5–7, 7–6^{(7–2)}

Details
- Draw: 64
- Seeds: 16

Events
Singles	men	women		boys	girls
Doubles	men	women	mixed	boys	girls
WC Singles	men	women	quad
WC Doubles	men	women	quad
Legends	men	women	mixed
← 1986 ·	US Open	· 1988 →

The men's doubles tournament at the 1987 US Open was held from September 1 to September 14, 1987, on the outdoor hard courts at the USTA National Tennis Center in New York City, United States. Stefan Edberg and Anders Järryd won the title, defeating Ken Flach and Robert Seguso in the final.

== Seeds ==
1. (Sweden) Stefan Edberg / (Sweden) Anders Järryd (champions)
2. (United States) Ken Flach / (United States) Robert Seguso (final)
3. (Spain) Sergio Casal / (Spain) Emilio Sánchez (semifinals)
4. (Ecuador) Andrés Gómez / (Socialist Federal Republic of Yugoslavia) Slobodan Živojinović (semifinals)
5. (United States) Gary Donnelly / (United States) Peter Fleming (first round)
6. (Sweden) Joakim Nyström / (Sweden) Mats Wilander (quarterfinals)
7. (Czechoslovakia) Miloslav Mečíř / (Czechoslovakia) Tomáš Šmíd (third round)
8. (United States) Paul Annacone / (United States) Mike De Palmer (quarterfinals)
9. (Australia) Peter Doohan / (Australia) Laurie Warder (second round)
10. (United States) Chip Hooper / (United States) Mike Leach (third round)
11. (United States) Scott Davis / (United States) David Pate (quarterfinals)
12. (United States) Jim Pugh / (United States) Blaine Willenborg (third round)
13. (Iran) Mansour Bahrami / (Uruguay) Diego Pérez (third round)
14. (United States) Rick Leach / (United States) Tim Pawsat (first round)
15. (United States) Andy Kohlberg / (United States) Robert Van't Hof (third round)
16. (West Germany) Eric Jelen / (Czechoslovakia) Jaroslav Navrátil (first round)

== Draw ==
=== Key ===
- Q = Qualifier
- WC = Wild card
- LL = Lucky loser
- Alt = Alternate
- ITF = ITF entry
- PR = Protected ranking
- SR = Special ranking
- SE = Special exempt
- JE = Junior exempt
- JR = Junior Accelerator Programme entrant
- CO = College Accelerator Programme entrant
- NG = Next Gen Accelerator Program entrant
- w/o = Walkover
- r = Retired
- d = Defaulted

=== Finals ===
Quarterfinals
1	(Sweden) Stefan Edberg (Sweden) Anders Järryd	6	6	3	6
(Mexico) Jorge Lozano (United States) Todd Witsken	3	4	6	4
3	(Spain) Sergio Casal (Spain) Emilio Sánchez	6	6	6
11	(United States) Scott Davis (United States) David Pate	2	2	4
6	(Sweden) Joakim Nyström (Sweden) Mats Wilander	3	2	6
4	(Ecuador) Andrés Gómez (Socialist Federal Republic of Yugoslavia) Slobodan Živojinović	6	6	7
8	(United States) Paul Annacone (United States) Mike De Palmer	6	4	6	7	5
2	(United States) Ken Flach (United States) Robert Seguso	3	6	7	6	7

Semifinals
1	(Sweden) Stefan Edberg (Sweden) Anders Järryd	6	6	6
3	(Spain) Sergio Casal (Spain) Emilio Sánchez	4	4	0
4	(Ecuador) Andrés Gómez (Socialist Federal Republic of Yugoslavia) Slobodan Živojinović	3	6	5
2	(United States) Ken Flach (United States) Robert Seguso	6	7	7

Final
1	(Sweden) Stefan Edberg (Sweden) Anders Järryd	7	6	4	5	7
2	(United States) Ken Flach (United States) Robert Seguso	6^{1}	2	6	7	6^{2}

=== Top half ===
==== Section 1 ====
First round
1	(Sweden) S Edberg (Sweden) A Järryd	6	6
(United States) J Tarango (United States) D Wheaton	2	4
(Australia) D Cahill (Australia) M Kratzmann	7	6	3
(India) R Krishnan (Netherlands) M Schapers	6	7	6
(United Kingdom) J Lloyd (Australia) P McNamee	5	3	3
(Italy) P Canè (Italy) S Colombo	3^{r}
(Brazil) N Aerts (United States) T Siegel	6	4	6
16	(West Germany) E Jelen (Czechoslovakia) J Navrátil	1	6	2
9	(Australia) P Doohan (Australia) L Warder	6	7
(South Africa) C Steyn (South Africa) D Visser	4	6
(Mexico) J Lozano (United States) T Witsken	6	7
(South Africa) G Muller (United States) T Nelson	4	5
(United States) N Caswell (United States) L Jensen	6	4	4
(United States) M Flur (United States) D Tarr	3	6	6
(United States) R Baxter (United States) J Rive	2	4
7	(Czechoslovakia) M Mečíř (Czechoslovakia) T Šmíd	6	6

Second round
1	(Sweden) S Edberg (Sweden) A Järryd	6	6
(India) R Krishnan (Netherlands) M Schapers	3	2
(United Kingdom) J Lloyd (Australia) P McNamee	3	6	3
(Brazil) N Aerts (United States) T Siegel	6	3	6
9	(Australia) P Doohan (Australia) L Warder	4	6
(Mexico) J Lozano (United States) T Witsken	6	7
(United States) M Flur (United States) D Tarr	1	6	5
7	(Czechoslovakia) M Mečíř (Czechoslovakia) T Šmíd	6	4	7

Third round
1	(Sweden) S Edberg (Sweden) A Järryd	7	4	6
(Brazil) N Aerts (United States) T Siegel	5	6	1
(Mexico) J Lozano (United States) T Witsken	6	6
7	(Czechoslovakia) M Mečíř (Czechoslovakia) T Šmíd	2	4

Quarterfinals
1	(Sweden) S Edberg (Sweden) A Järryd	6	6	3	6
(Mexico) J Lozano (United States) T Witsken	3	4	6	4

==== Section 2 ====
First round
3	(Spain) S Casal (Spain) E Sánchez	7	7
(Israel) G Bloom (Israel) A Mansdorf	6	5
(United States) G Layendecker (Canada) G Michibata	6	6
(United States) B Gilbert (Switzerland) J Hlasek	4	4
(Canada) G Connell (United States) D Livingston	6	3
(United States) J Letts (Sweden) P Lundgren	7	6
(United States) E Korita (Australia) K Warwick	5	7	6
14	(United States) R Leach (United States) T Pawsat	7	6	4
11	(United States) S Davis (United States) D Pate	5	7	6
(United States) S Denton (United States) S Giammalva	7	6	4
(United States) D Dowlen (United States) M Freeman	7	6
(Paraguay) F González (United States) T Warneke	4	3
(Mexico) L Lavalle (Mexico) A Moreno	6	1	4
(United States) L Bourne (United States) J Klaparda	2	6	6
(United States) B Cox (Switzerland) C Mezzadri	4	6	6
5	(United States) G Donnelly (United States) P Fleming	6	4	4

Second round
3	(Spain) S Casal (Spain) E Sánchez	7	6
(United States) G Layendecker (Canada) G Michibata	6	4
(United States) J Letts (Sweden) P Lundgren	6	2	6
(United States) E Korita (Australia) K Warwick	4	6	7
11	(United States) S Davis (United States) D Pate	6	7	6
(United States) D Dowlen (United States) M Freeman	7	6	4
(United States) L Bourne (United States) J Klaparda	5	2
(United States) B Cox (Switzerland) C Mezzadri	7	6

Third round
3	(Spain) S Casal (Spain) E Sánchez	6	6
(United States) E Korita (Australia) K Warwick	2	2
11	(United States) S Davis (United States) D Pate	6	7
(United States) B Cox (Switzerland) C Mezzadri	3	6

Quarterfinals
3	(Spain) S Casal (Spain) E Sánchez	6	6	6
11	(United States) S Davis (United States) D Pate	2	2	4

=== Bottom half ===
==== Section 3 ====
First round
6	(Sweden) J Nyström (Sweden) M Wilander	6	6
(United States) H Pfister (Sweden) J Svensson	4	4
(United States) A Agassi (United States) M Purcell	3	6	5
(Austria) A Antonitsch (Poland) W Fibak	6	3	7
(Chile) R Acuña (South Africa) M Robertson	6	5	6
(United States) M Anger (United States) G Holmes	4	7	4
(United States) J Grabb (United States) K Jones	3	5
12	(United States) J Pugh (United States) B Willenborg	6	7
13	(Iran) M Bahrami (Uruguay) D Pérez	5	7	6
(Denmark) M Mortensen (United States) T Wilkison	7	6	3
(South Africa) P Aldrich (South Africa) W Green	1	5
(United States) D Goldie (United States) P McEnroe	6	7
(Czechoslovakia) P Složil (Czechoslovakia) M Šrejber	4	2
(Nigeria) N Odizor (United States) B Testerman	6	6
(United States) Ti Gullikson (United States) To Gullikson	6	6
4	(Ecuador) A Gómez (Socialist Federal Republic of Yugoslavia) S Živojinović	7	7

Second round
6	(Sweden) J Nyström (Sweden) M Wilander	7	6
(Austria) A Antonitsch (Poland) W Fibak	6	4
(Chile) R Acuña (South Africa) M Robertson	5	6	6
12	(United States) J Pugh (United States) B Willenborg	7	3	7
13	(Iran) M Bahrami (Uruguay) D Pérez	7	6
(United States) D Goldie (United States) P McEnroe	6	3
(Nigeria) N Odizor (United States) B Testerman	7	6	2
4	(Ecuador) A Gómez (Socialist Federal Republic of Yugoslavia) S Živojinović	6	7	6

Third round
6	(Sweden) J Nyström (Sweden) M Wilander	6	6
12	(United States) J Pugh (United States) B Willenborg	4	4
13	(Iran) M Bahrami (Uruguay) D Pérez	3	6	1
4	(Ecuador) A Gómez (Socialist Federal Republic of Yugoslavia) S Živojinović	6	3	6

Quarterfinals
6	(Sweden) J Nyström (Sweden) M Wilander	3	2	6
3	(Ecuador) A Gómez (Socialist Federal Republic of Yugoslavia) S Živojinović	6	6	7

==== Section 4 ====
First round
8	(United States) P Annacone (United States) M De Palmer	6	7
(Peru) C di laura (Spain) J Sánchez	2	6
(New Zealand) K Evernden (United States) J Kriek	6	6
(United Kingdom) A Castle (United States) P Chamberlin	3	3
(United States) J Berger (United States) J Ross	3	6	6
(United States) B Levine (Australia) D Macpherson	6	3	0
(United States) J Arias (United States) E Teltscher	3	2
10	(United States) C Hooper (United States) M Leach	6	6
15	(United States) A Kohlberg (United States) R Van't Hof	7	6
(United States) M Dickson (United States) R Rudeen	6	2
(Australia) C Limberger (Australia) M Woodforde	1	4
(Brazil) R Acioly (United States) L Scott	6	6
(Australia) B Dyke (Australia) M Fancutt	4	1
(Australia) J Fitzgerald (Australia) W Masur	6	6
(France) G Forget (France) H Leconte	7	3	4
2	(United States) K Flach (United States) R Seguso	5	6	6

Second round
8	(United States) P Annacone (United States) M De Palmer	6	6
(New Zealand) K Evernden (United States) J Kriek	2	1
(United States) J Berger (United States) J Ross	6	2
10	(United States) C Hooper (United States) M Leach	7	6
15	(United States) A Kohlberg (United States) R Van't Hof	7	6
(Brazil) R Acioly (United States) L Scott	6	3
(Australia) J Fitzgerald (Australia) W Masur	4	4
2	(United States) K Flach (United States) R Seguso	6	6

Third round
8	(United States) P Annacone (United States) M De Palmer	6	5	7
10	(United States) C Hooper (United States) M Leach	4	7	6
15	(United States) A Kohlberg (United States) R Van't Hof	2	6
2	(United States) K Flach (United States) R Seguso	6	7

Quarterfinals
8	(United States) P Annacone (United States) M De Palmer	6	4	6	7	5
2	(United States) K Flach (United States) R Seguso	3	6	7	6	7
