= Martina Navratilova =

Czech-American tennis player (born 1956)

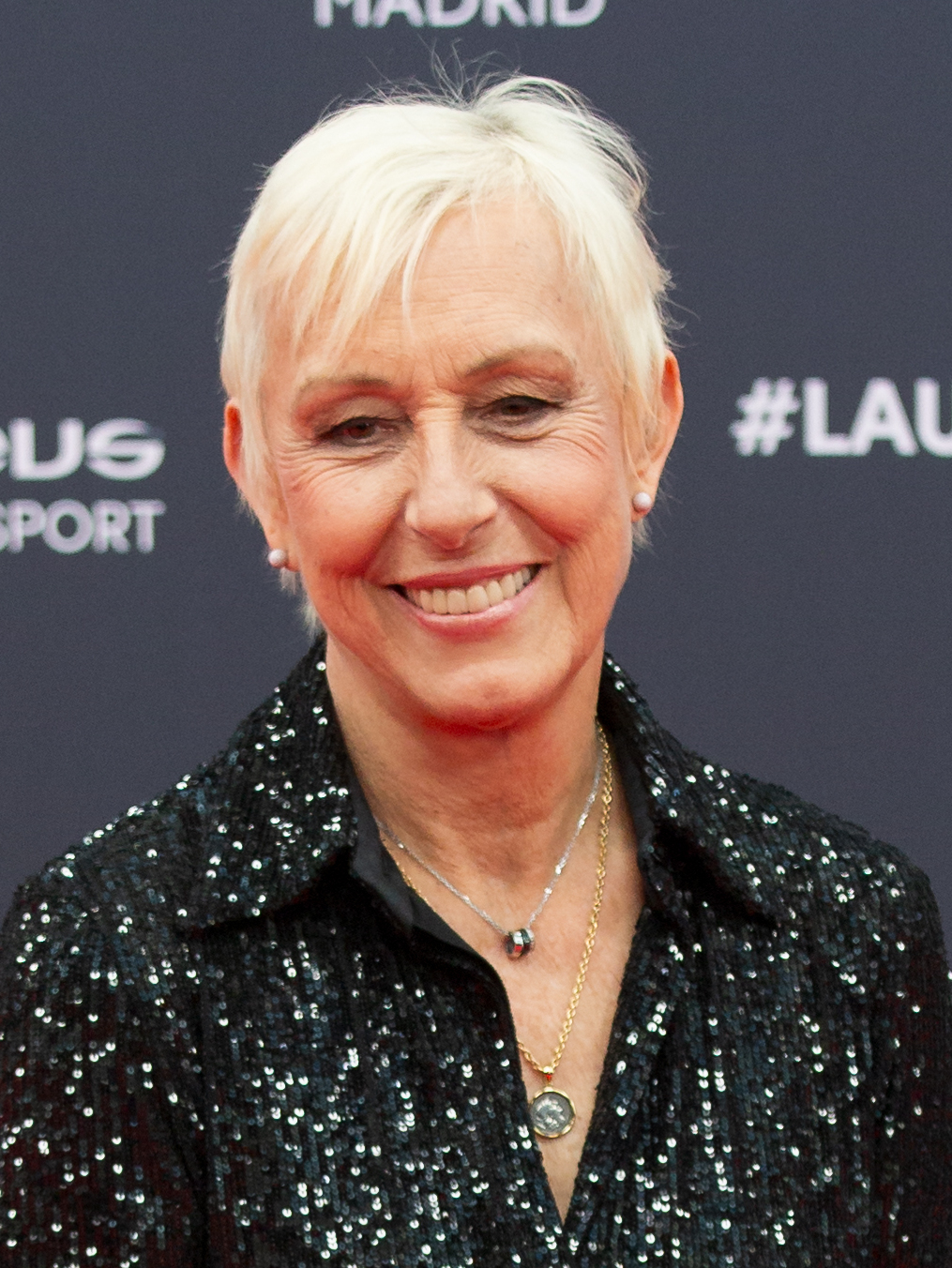
- Navratilova in 2024
- Residence: Miami, Florida, U.S.
- Born: October 18, 1956 (age 70) Prague, Czechoslovakia
- Height: 5 ft 8 in (173 cm)
- Turned pro: 1974
- Retired: 2006
- Plays: Left-handed (one-handed backhand)
- Prize money: US$21,626,089: 26th in all-time rankings
- Int. Tennis HoF: 2000 (member page)

Singles
- Career record: 1442–219 (86.82%)
- Career titles: 167 (Open era record)
- Highest ranking: No. 1 (July 10, 1978)

Grand Slam singles results
- Australian Open: W (1981, 1983, 1985)
- French Open: W (1982, 1984)
- Wimbledon: W (1978, 1979, 1982, 1983, 1984, 1985, 1986, 1987, 1990)
- US Open: W (1983, 1984, 1986, 1987)

Other tournaments
- Tour Finals: W (1978, 1979, 1981, 1983, 1984, 1985, 1986^{Mar}, 1986^{Nov})

Doubles
- Career record: 747–143 (83.93%)
- Career titles: 177 (Open era record)
- Highest ranking: No. 1 (September 10, 1984)

Grand Slam doubles results
- Australian Open: W (1980, 1982, 1983, 1984, 1985, 1987, 1988, 1989)
- French Open: W (1975, 1982, 1984, 1985, 1986, 1987, 1988)
- Wimbledon: W (1976, 1979, 1981, 1982, 1983, 1984, 1986)
- US Open: W (1977, 1978, 1980, 1983, 1984, 1986, 1987, 1989, 1990)

Other doubles tournaments
- Tour Finals: W (1977, 1978, 1980, 1981, 1982, 1983, 1984, 1985, 1986^{Nov}, 1987, 1988, 1989, 1991)
- Olympic Games: QF (2004)

Mixed doubles
- Career titles: 10

Grand Slam mixed doubles results
- Australian Open: W (2003)
- French Open: W (1974, 1985)
- Wimbledon: W (1985, 1993, 1995, 2003)
- US Open: W (1985, 1987, 2006)

Team competitions
- Fed Cup: W (1975, 1982, 1986, 1989)

Coaching career (2014–2015)
- Agnieszka Radwańska (2014–2015)

Martina Navratilova (Czech: Martina Navrátilová, pronounced [ˈmarcɪna ˈnavraːcɪlovaː]; née Šubertová [ˈʃubɛrtovaː]; born October 18, 1956) is a Czech-American former professional tennis player. She was ranked world No. 1 in women's singles for 332 weeks (second-most all time), including as the year-end No. 1 seven times, and was world No. 1 in women's doubles for a record 237 weeks. Navratilova won 167 top-level singles titles and 177 doubles titles (both the Open Era records), including an Open Era record 59 major titles: 18 in singles, an all-time record 31 in women's doubles, and an Open Era record 10 in mixed doubles. Her nine Wimbledon singles titles are an all-time record. Alongside Chris Evert, her greatest rival, Navratilova dominated women's tennis for much of the 1980s.

Navratilova won a record six consecutive singles majors across 1983 and 1984 while simultaneously winning the Grand Slam in doubles. Navratilova claims the best professional season winning percentage, 98.9% in 1983 (going 86–1 for the season), and the longest all-surface winning streak of 74 straight match wins. She reached the Wimbledon singles final 12 times, including for nine consecutive years from 1982 through 1990. Navratilova is one of three tennis players, along with Margaret Court and Doris Hart, to have accomplished a career Grand Slam in singles, doubles, and mixed doubles, called the career "Boxed Set". She won her last major title, the mixed doubles competition at the 2006 US Open, shortly before her 50th birthday, and 32 years after her first major title in 1974.

Originally from Czechoslovakia, Navratilova was stripped of her citizenship when she asked the United States for political asylum in 1975. She became a US citizen in 1981, and in 2008, also acquired Czech citizenship. Navratilova has been openly gay since 1981, and has been an activist on gay rights.

== Early life and background ==
Navratilova was born Martina Šubertová in Prague, Czechoslovakia. Her parents divorced when she was three, and her mother, an accomplished gymnast, tennis player, and ski instructor, moved the family to Řevnice. In 1962, her mother Jana married Miroslav "Mirek" Navrátil, who became her first tennis coach. Martina then took the name of her stepfather (adding the feminine suffix -ová), thus becoming Martina Navrátilová. Her biological father, Miroslav Šubert, was a ski instructor and had died when Martina was still a young girl.

Navratilova has a younger sister, Jana, and an older paternal half-brother. Her grandmother, Agnes Semanska, was a tennis player for the Czechoslovak Federation before the Second World War and had a ranking as high as No. 2 among Czechoslovak women during her amateur career.

When Navratilova was four, she was hitting a tennis ball off a concrete wall and started to play tennis regularly at age seven. In 1972, at the age of 15, she won the Czechoslovakia national tennis championship. In 1973, aged 16, she made her debut on the United States Lawn Tennis Association professional tour but did not turn professional until 1975. Although perhaps most renowned for her mastery of fast low-bouncing grass, her best early showing at majors was on the red clay at the French Open, where she would go on to reach the final six times. In 1973, she made the quarterfinals, where she lost 6–7, 4–6 to Evonne Goolagong. She made the quarterfinals the next year and lost to Helga Masthoff (née Niessen).

== Professional tennis career ==
=== Early career ===
Navratilova won her first professional singles title in Orlando, Florida, in 1974 at the age of 17. Upon arriving in the United States, she lived with former actress Frances Dewey Wormser and her husband Morton Wormser, a tennis enthusiast.

Navratilova was the runner-up at two major singles tournaments in 1975; the Australian Open (won by Goolagong) and the French Open (won by Chris Evert in three sets). After losing to Evert in the semifinals of the US Open in September, the 18-year-old Navratilova went to the offices of the Immigration and Naturalization Service in New York City and informed them that she wished to defect from communist Czechoslovakia. Within a month, she received a green card and in 1981 became a US citizen. Also, in 1975, Navratilova teamed with world number one Evert to win the French Open women's doubles title, Navratilova's first major title outside of mixed doubles. They teamed again in 1976 to win the Wimbledon women's doubles title over Billie Jean King and Bette Stove.

=== 1978 Wimbledon singles champion ===
Navratilova won her first major singles title at Wimbledon in 1978, where she defeated Evert in three sets in the final and captured the world No. 1 ranking for the first time on the WTA computer, a position she held until Evert took it back in January 1979. She successfully defended her Wimbledon title in 1979, again beating Evert in the final, this time in straight sets, and earned the World No. 1 ranking at the end of the year for the first time. Just before Wimbledon in 1979, Navratilova and Evert played possibly the highest scoring women's professional match ever in the Eastbourne final, in which Evert edged Navratilova 7–5, 5–7, 13–11 after facing match points.

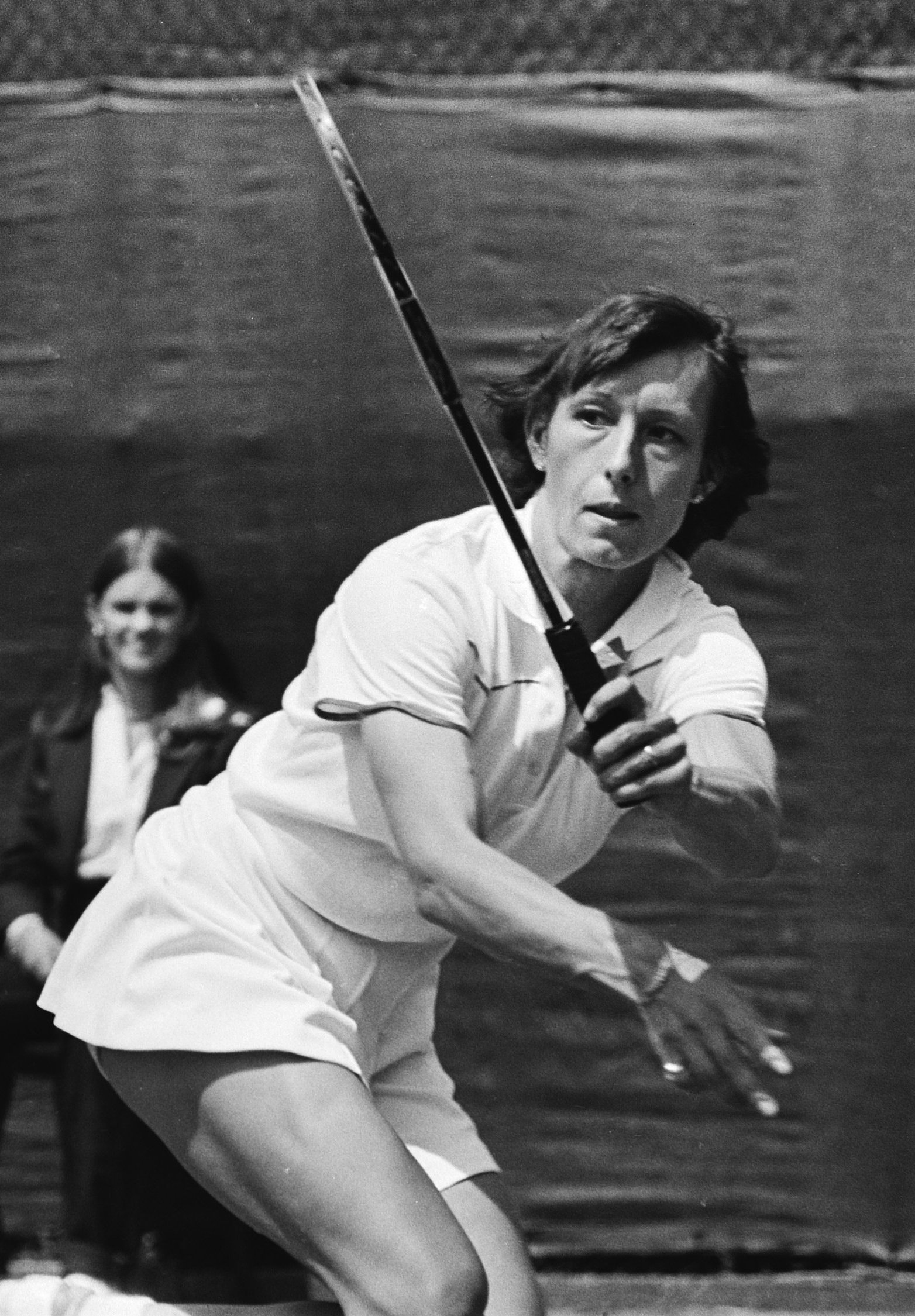
Navratilova in 1980

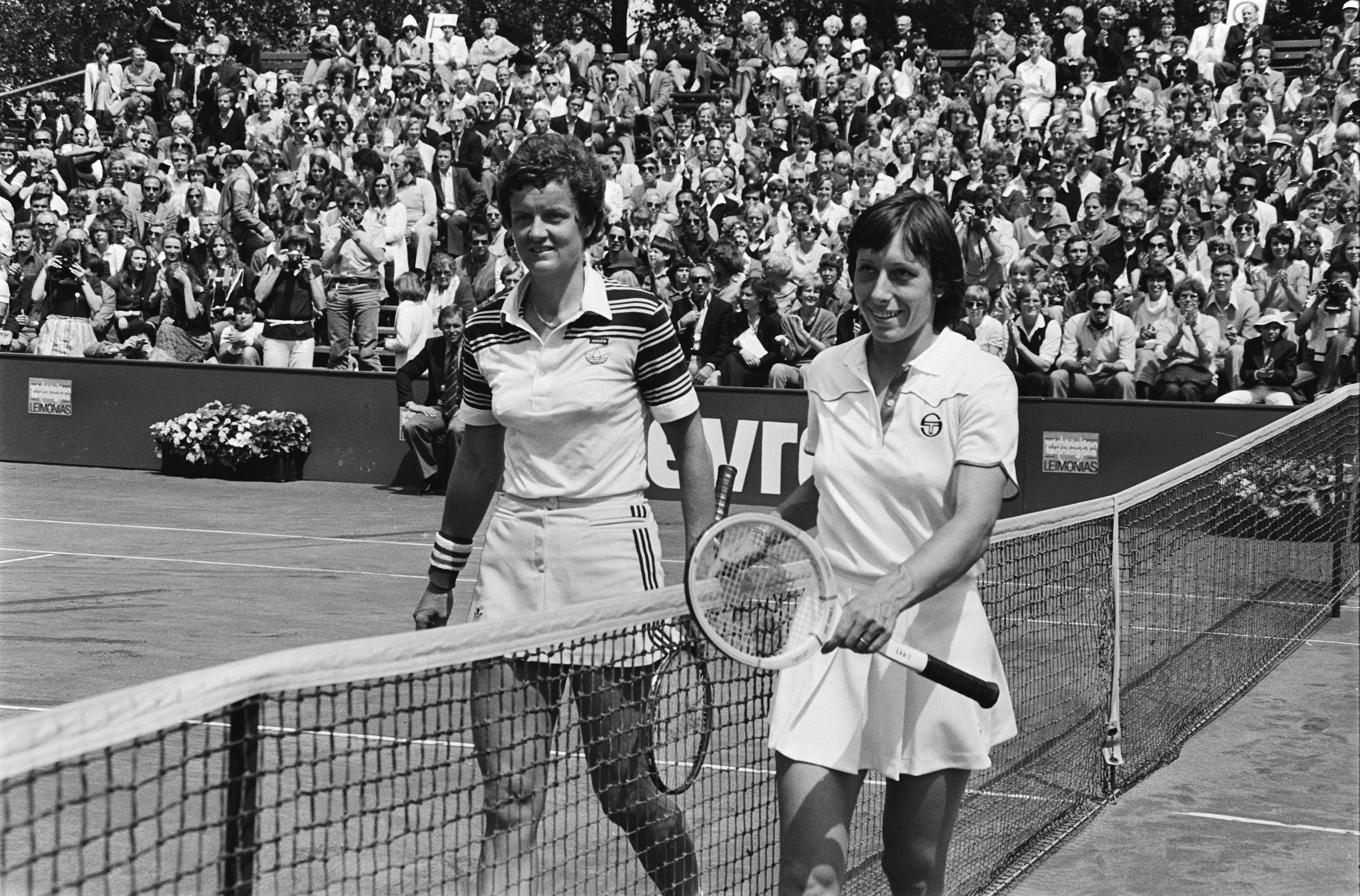
Navratilova and Betty Stöve during a match in 1980

In 1980, Navratilova defeated previous six-time Wimbledon champion Billie Jean King in a two-day epic in the quarterfinals of Wimbledon, with a scoreline of 7–6^{(8–6)}, 1–6, 10–8. In April 1981, Evert defeated Navratilova in the finals of the Women's Tennis Association championships, held on clay at Amelia Island, 6–0, 6–0. It was Navratilova's only professional double bagel loss (one she later avenged with a crushing 6–2, 6–0 defeat of Evert in the finals of the same Amelia Island event in 1984). It was at this point that Navratilova began working with Nancy Lieberman to improve her fitness and toughen her mental approach to better compete with Evert and fulfill her true potential. In 1981, Navratilova won her third major singles title by defeating Evert in the final of the Australian Open. Navratilova also defeated Evert to reach the final of the US Open, where she lost a third set tiebreak to Tracy Austin. Navratilova won both Wimbledon and the French Open in 1982.

=== Dominance ===
After adopting basketball player Nancy Lieberman's exercise plan and using Yonex isometric midsize graphite-fiberglass composite racquets, Navratilova became the most dominant player in women's tennis. After losing in the fourth round of the first major event of 1983, the French Open, she captured the year's three remaining major titles (the Australian Open was held in December at that time). Navratilova's loss at the French Open was her only singles defeat during that year, during which she established an 86–1 record. Her winning percentage was the best ever for a post-1968 professional tennis player. During 1982, 1983, and 1984, Navratilova lost a total of only six singles matches. This included a run of 13 consecutive victories over her closest rival and world-ranked No. 2, Chris Evert. Navratilova's reign from 1982 to 1986 is the most dominant unbroken spell in the professional era.

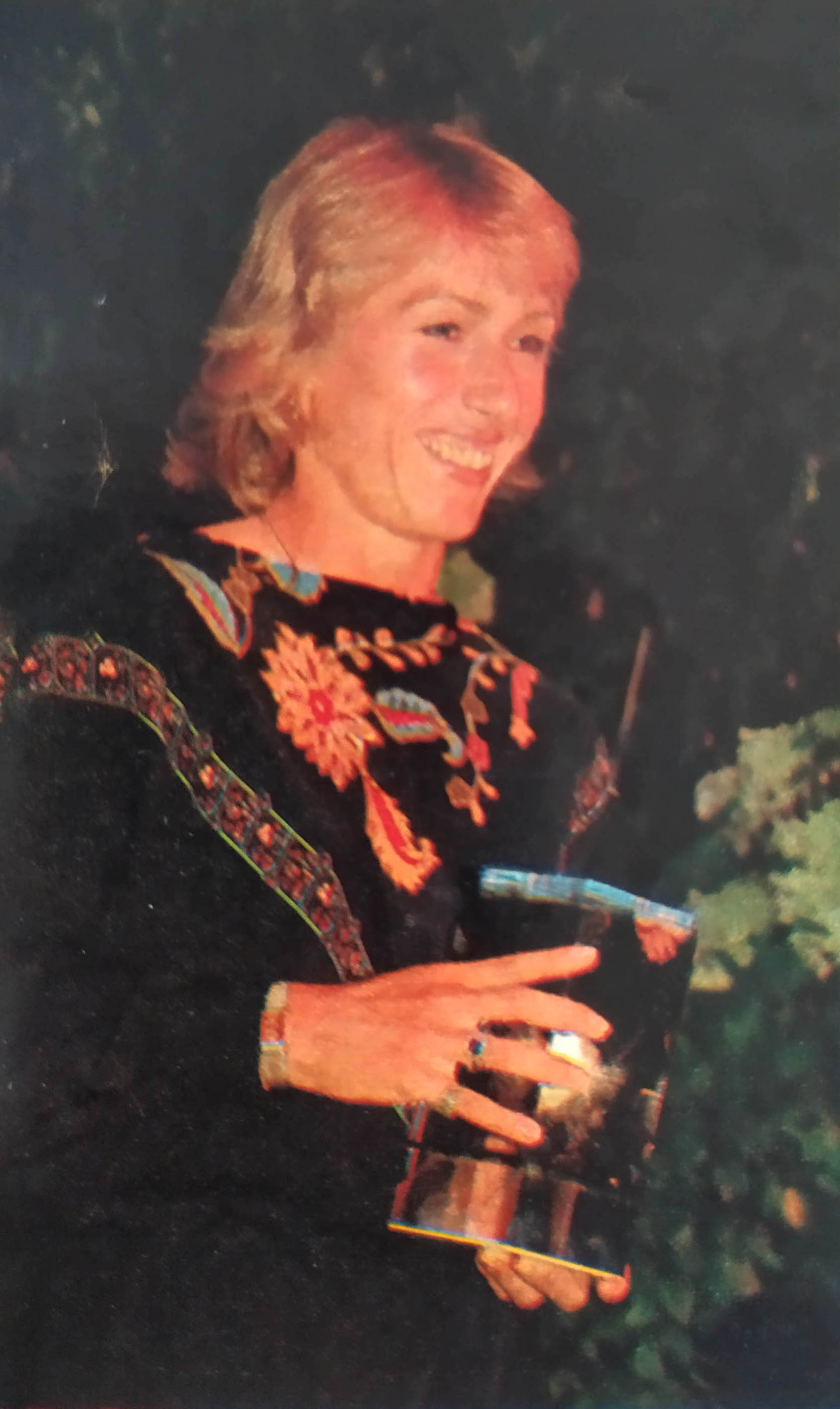
Navratilova in 1984

Navratilova won the 1984 French Open, thus holding all four major singles titles simultaneously. Her accomplishment was declared a "Grand Slam" by Philippe Chatrier, president of the International Tennis Federation, although some tennis observers countered that it was not a true slam because the titles had not been won in a single calendar year. Navratilova extended her major singles tournament winning streak to a record-equalling six following wins at Wimbledon and the US Open. Navratilova's victory meant she became the first player to win majors on clay, grass and hard court on the same year. She entered the 1984 Australian Open with a chance of winning all four titles in the same year. In the semifinals, Helena Suková ended Navratilova's 74-match winning streak (a record for a professional) 1–6, 6–3, 7–5.

A left-hander, Navratilova completed a calendar grand slam in women's doubles in 1984, partnering right-handed Pam Shriver. This was part of a record 109-match winning streak that the pair achieved between 1983 and 1985. (Navratilova was ranked the world No. 1 doubles player for a period of over three years in the 1980s.) From 1985 through 1987, Navratilova reached the women's singles final at all 11 major tournaments held during those three years, winning six of them. From 1982 through 1990, she reached the Wimbledon final nine consecutive times. She reached the US Open final five consecutive times from 1983 through 1987 and appeared in the French Open final five out of six years from 1982 through 1987.

=== Rivalry with Chris Evert ===
In 1985, Navratilova played in what many consider to be perhaps the best woman's match of all time, the French Open final against Chris Evert. Navratilova battled back from 3–6, 2–4 down to 5–5 all in the third set, before Evert hit a winning backhand passing shot on match point to defeat Navratilova 6–3, 6–7^{(4–7)}, 7–5. This was a major turnaround for Evert, who was so outmatched the year earlier in the final that Bud Collins remarked as a TV commentator that the sport needed to create a higher league for Navratilova to compete in. In outdoor matches against Evert, Navratilova led 10–5 on grass and 9–7 on hard courts, while Evert was up 11–3 on clay. On indoor courts, however, Navratilova had a decisive 21–14 lead. At the end of what is widely regarded as the greatest rivalry in women's tennis, Navratilova led Evert 43–37 in total matches, 14–8 in Grand Slams, and 10–4 in Grand Slam finals.

=== Rivalry with Steffi Graf ===
In 1986 at the US Open, in the most anticipated match of the tournament, Navratilova prevailed over 17-year-old German Steffi Graf in the semifinals 6–1, 6–7^{(7–3)}, 7–6^{(10–8)}, saving three match points in an epic spread over two days. She then handily won the final over Helena Suková 6–3, 6–2. Navratilova, with partner Pam Shriver, also won the women's doubles title. Navratilova also defeated Graf in straight sets at the WTA Tour Championship and with an 89–3 record, earned the number-one ranking for the fifth consecutive year.

Graf dominated the first half of the 1987 season including defeating Navratilova in straight sets in the semi-finals of the Miami Open and in the final of the French Open, 6–4, 4–6, 8–6. However, Navratilova defeated Graf in straight sets in the finals of both Wimbledon and the US Open (and at the US Open became only the third player in the Open Era, joining tennis legends Margaret Court and Billie Jean King, to win the women's singles, women's doubles, and mixed doubles at the same event—the rare "Triple Crown"). Navratilova reached all four Grand Slam finals in 1987, winning two of them (she lost the Australian Open to Hana Mandlíková). Graf's two losses to Navratilova were her only losses of the year and with 11 tournament wins over the year versus 4 for Navratilova she was able to obtain year-end world No. 1 ranking ahead of Navratilova at No. 2. Graf eventually broke Navratilova's records of 156 consecutive weeks and 331 total weeks as the world No. 1 singles player but fell 60 short of Navratilova's record of 167 singles titles. Including doubles, Navratilova won almost three times as many titles as Graf with a record doubles/mixed/singles combined total of 344 titles to Graf's 118.

In 1988, Graf won all four major singles titles, beating the 31-year-old Navratilova 5–7, 6–2, 6–1 in the Wimbledon final, their only match of the year, recovering from a set and a break down. Navratilova did not reach the finals of any of the other Grand Slam events but did win nine tournaments enabling her to claim the No. 2 ranking behind Graf.

In 1989, Graf and Navratilova met in the finals of both Wimbledon and the US Open, with Graf winning both encounters 6–1 in the third set. Graf also defeated Navratilova in the finals of the WTA Tour Championships their third and final match of the year. Navratilova, who skipped the French Open that year, did win eight titles and was able to capture the No. 2 ranking behind Graf for the third straight year. Despite the 13 year age difference between the two players, and Graf's comparative lack of investment in doubles and mixed doubles, Navratilova won 9 of the 18 career singles matches with Graf and 5 of the 9 major singles matches with her. At age 34, Navratilova defeated Graf the last time they played in a major in the semifinals of the 1991 US Open 7–6^{(7–2)}, 6–7^{(6–8)}, 6–4, to end their Grand Slam rivalry 5–4 up, although it is noteworthy that all 4 of Graf's Grand Slam victories over Navratilova came in the finals of a Slam. This is reflected in the Grand Slams Finals chart below.

=== Final Grand Slam singles title ===
Navratilova's final Grand Slam singles triumph was in 1990. In the final at Wimbledon, the 33-year-old Navratilova swept Zina Garrison 6–4, 6–1 to claim an all-time-record ninth Wimbledon singles crown. She won four other tournaments that year, although she did not participate in the Australian or French Opens, and finished the year ranked No. 3 in the world, narrowly edged by 16-year-old Monica Seles for the No. 2 spot. In September 1992, the 35-year-old Navratilova played 40-year-old Jimmy Connors in the third Battle of the Sexes tennis match at Caesars Palace in Paradise, Nevada. Connors was allowed only one serve per point, and Navratilova was allowed to hit into half the doubles court. Connors won 7–5, 6–2. She played for the Boston Lobsters in the World TeamTennis pro league through the 2009 season.

Though Wimbledon 1990 was her last major singles title, Navratilova reached two additional major singles finals during the remainder of her career: in 1991, she lost in the US Open final to No. 1 Monica Seles; and, in 1994, at age 37, Navratilova reached the Wimbledon final, where she lost in three sets to Conchita Martínez. In November that year, after losing to Gabriela Sabatini in the first round of the WTA Tour Championships, she retired from full-time competition on the singles tour. She was inducted into the International Tennis Hall of Fame in 2000.

=== Focus on doubles ===
In 2000, Navratilova returned to the tour to mostly play doubles events, while rarely also playing singles. In her first singles performance in eight years, at Eastbourne in 2002, she beat world No. 22, Tatiana Panova, then lost in the next round to Daniela Hantuchová in three sets. In 2003, she won the mixed doubles titles at both the Australian Open and Wimbledon, partnering Leander Paes. This made her the oldest ever major champion (aged 46 years, 8 months). The Australian Open victory made her the third player in history to complete a "boxed set" of major titles by winning the singles, women's doubles, and mixed doubles at all four majors. The Wimbledon win allowed her to equal Billie Jean King's record of 20 Wimbledon titles (in singles, women's doubles, and mixed doubles combined) and extended her overall number of major titles to 58 (second only to Margaret Court, who won 64). Navratilova made a return to singles at the 2004 French Open after an absence of 10 years, but she was defeated by Gisela Dulko in the first round. Shortly afterwards, and despite being criticized for receiving a wildcard, Navratilova won a singles match over Catalina Castaño 6–0 6–1 at the first round of Wimbledon in 2004, aged 47 years and eight months, to make her the oldest player to win a professional singles match in the open era. Navratilova then lost her second round match with the same player who had beaten her at the French Open the previous month, Gisela Dulko, in three sets.

On Thursday, July 6, 2006, Navratilova played her last matches at Wimbledon, with partner Liezel Huber losing a quarterfinal match in women's doubles to fourth seeds and eventual champions Yan Zi and Zheng Jie, and later in the same day with partner Mark Knowles losing in the third round of mixed doubles to eventual champions Andy Ram and Vera Zvonareva. She had said that her last Wimbledon wasn't about breaking her record shared with Billie Jean King of 20 championships. In an interview, Navratilova was quoted as saying, "People keep saying that, but it so wasn't. I just wanted to win one more title here, period."

=== Retirement ===
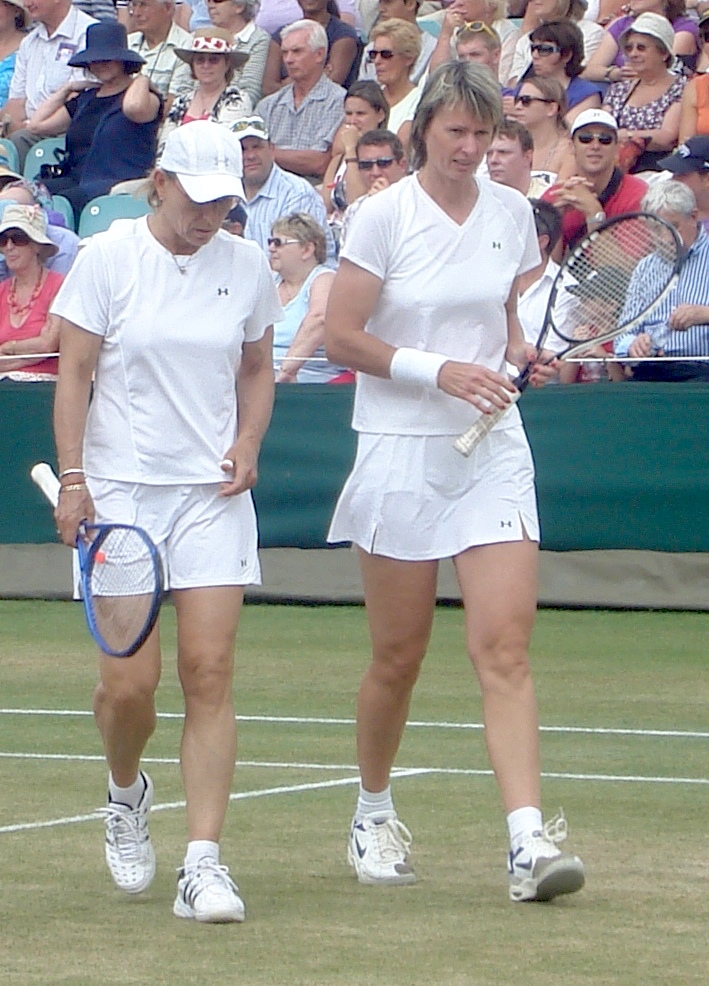
Navratilova and Suková playing doubles, 2009

Navratilova capped her career by winning the mixed doubles title, her 41st major doubles title (31 in women's doubles and 10 in mixed doubles) and 177th overall, at the 2006 US Open with American doubles specialist Bob Bryan. At the time, she was only about a month shy of her 50th birthday and broke her own record as the oldest ever major champion (aged 49 years, 10 months).

Navratilova won 167 top-level singles titles (more than any other player in the open era) and 177 doubles titles. Her last title in women's doubles came on August 21, 2006, at the Tier I Rogers Cup in Montreal, Quebec, where she partnered Nadia Petrova. Navratilova won 18 major singles titles: nine at Wimbledon, four at the US Open, three at the Australian Open, and two at the French Open. Her overall record in 67 major singles events was 306–49 (120–14 at Wimbledon, 89–17 at the US Open, 51–11 at the French Open, and 46–7 at the Australian Open). Some observers argue that the very few singles match she played in her forties should be counted separately in her career statistics. She is the only player to have won at least one tour event for 21 consecutive years and won the singles and doubles at the same event a record 84 times. She was ranked in the world's top 3 in singles for 15 years between 1977 and 1993. Her career singles match win total of 1,442 is the most during the open era.

== Playing style and coaches ==
Navratilova had an attacking serve and volley. Under Renée Richards, she improved her game tactics.

Evert said that "Martina revolutionized the game by her superb athleticism and aggressiveness...She brought athleticism to a whole new level with her training techniques—particularly cross-training, the idea that you could go to the gym or play basketball to get in shape for tennis."

Throughout her long career, Navratilova had many coaches. They included Miroslav Navrátil, George Parma, Věra Suková, Renée Richards (1981–1983), Mike Estep (1983–1986), and Craig Kardon (1988–1994).

== Coaching career ==
In December 2014, it was announced that Navratilova had joined Agnieszka Radwańska's coaching staff. However, in April 2015, after Radwańska struggled in the first half of the season, the pair decided to part ways.

== Personal life ==
Originally from Czechoslovakia, Navratilova was stripped of her citizenship when, in 1975 at age 18, she asked the United States for political asylum and was granted temporary residence. She became a U.S. citizen in 1981. On January 9, 2008, Navratilova reacquired Czech citizenship, thus becoming a dual citizen. She stated she has not renounced her U.S. citizenship nor does she plan to do so, and that claiming Czech nationality was not politically motivated.

In 1985, Navratilova released an autobiography, co-written with The New York Times sports columnist George Vecsey, titled Martina in the U.S. and Being Myself in the rest of the world. She had earlier co-written a tennis instruction book with Mary Carillo in 1982, titled Tennis My Way. She later wrote three mystery novels with Liz Nickles: The Total Zone (1994), Breaking Point (1996), and Killer Instinct (1997). Navratilova's most recent literary effort was a health and fitness book titled Shape Your Self, which came out in 2006. An ESPN Documentary was produced about her rivalry with Chris Evert titled Unmatched. Her rivalry and friendship with Evert is also detailed in the book, The Rivals by Johnette Howard and the children's book Martina and Chrissie by Phil Bildner.

=== Sexuality and relationships ===
In 1981, shortly after becoming a United States citizen, Navratilova gave an interview to New York Daily News sports reporter Steve Goldstein, coming out as bisexual and revealing that she had a sexual relationship with Rita Mae Brown, but asked him not to publish the article until she was ready to come out publicly. However, the New York Daily News published the article on July 30, 1981. Navratilova and Nancy Lieberman, her friend and roommate at the time, gave an interview to Dallas Morning News columnist Skip Bayless, where Navratilova reiterated that she was bisexual and Lieberman identified herself as straight. Navratilova has since reidentified herself as homosexual.

From 1984 to 1991, Navratilova had a long-term relationship with Judy Nelson, whom she met at a tournament in Fort Worth in 1982 (at the time Nelson was married with two children). Their split in 1991 resulted in a televised palimony lawsuit, which was settled out of court. On September 6, 2014, Navratilova proposed to her long-time girlfriend Julia Lemigova, a former Miss USSR, at the US Open. They married in New York on December 15, 2014.

=== Health problems ===
According to The New York Times' Jane E. Brody, in September 1982, an acute attack of toxoplasmosis "contributed to Martina Navratilova's defeat during the US Open tournament", in which No. 1 seed Navratilova unexpectedly lost to No. 7 seed Pam Shriver in the quarterfinal round. By late October, Navratilova had "apparently recovered".

Navratilova began to wear glasses in 1985 and recalled that her vision had begun to deteriorate in 1984. She continued to wear glasses for tennis for many years. Few tennis players wear sunglasses regularly for tennis and Navratilova is one of them. Although she achieved so much prior to using glasses, her glasses have become iconic. Some sports writers have said that they made her seem more vulnerable and human, as with other top athletes who had imperfect health.

On April 7, 2010, Navratilova announced that she was being treated for breast cancer. A routine mammogram in January 2010 revealed that she had a ductal carcinoma in situ in her left breast, which she was informed of on February 24, and in March she had the tumour surgically removed; she received radiation therapy in May.

In December 2010, Navratilova was hospitalized after developing high-altitude pulmonary edema while attempting a climb of Mount Kilimanjaro in Tanzania.

In January 2023, Navratilova was diagnosed with both throat (stage one) and breast cancer. This came after Navratilova discovered a swollen lymph node on her neck, leading her to take medical tests. In March 2023 and after more preventive radiation, she stated that she was cancer-free.

== Activism and opinions ==
Navratilova is involved with various charities that benefit animal rights, underprivileged children, and gay rights. Navratilova serves as the Health and Fitness Ambassador for AARP in an alliance created to help AARP's millions of members lead active, healthy lives. Navratilova has described herself as a vegetarian. In an April 2006 interview, she said she had begun eating fish again because she found it hard to get enough protein while on the road. Navratilova is a Democrat, and has donated more than $25,000 to Democratic campaigns.

=== Gay rights ===
Navratilova participated in a lawsuit against Amendment 2, a successful 1992 ballot proposition in Colorado designed to prevent sexual orientation from being a protected class. In 1993, Navratilova spoke before the March on Washington for Lesbian, Gay and Bi Equal Rights and Liberation. In 2000, she was the recipient of National Equality Award from the Human Rights Campaign.

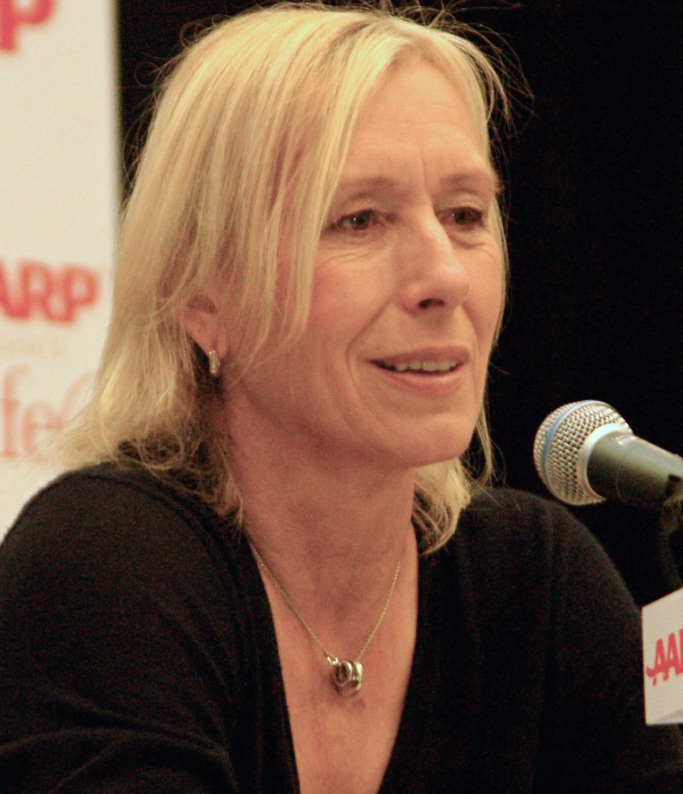
Navratilova in September 2011

Navratilova is a patron of the Lesbian Project, which describes itself as "an organisation dedicated to representing the rights and interests of lesbians in the UK". She said "At a time when lesbian rights in many countries are being eroded I am proud to be a patron of The Lesbian Project, an organisation dedicated to the well-being of UK-based lesbians—a force for good."

=== Anti-communism ===
She is a vocal opponent of communism and was vocal in opposition to the Soviet Bloc power structure that compelled her to flee her native Czechoslovakia. She has denounced the Soviet Union's rule in Czechoslovakia.

Whenever people go into politics and they try to say that communism was a good thing, I say, 'Go ahead and live in a communist country then, if you think it's so great.'

=== Republicans ===
Navratilova was a guest on CNN's Connie Chung Tonight show on July 17, 2002. During the show, Chung quoted a German newspaper which quoted Navratilova as saying:

The most absurd part of my escape from the unjust system is that I have exchanged one system that suppresses free opinion for another. The Republicans in the U.S. manipulate public opinion and sweep controversial issues under the table. It's depressing. Decisions in America are based solely on the question of how much money will come out of it and not on the questions of how much health, morals or environment suffer as a result.

Navratilova said that the remarks referred to what she perceived as a trend of centralization of government power and a loss of personal freedom. In the discussion that followed, Chung stated:

Can I be honest with you? I can tell you that when I read this, I have to tell you that I thought it was un-American, unpatriotic. I wanted to say, go back to Czechoslovakia. You know, if you don't like it here, this a country that gave you so much, gave you the freedom to do what you want.

Navratilova responded,

And I'm giving it back. This is why I speak out. When I see something that I don't like, I'm going to speak out because you can do that here. And again, I feel there are too many things happening that are taking our rights away.

Navratilova was quoted in 2007 as being ashamed of the U.S. under President George W. Bush because, unlike the communist regime in Czechoslovakia which established its dictatorship as a result of the 1948 coup d'état, Bush was democratically elected.

=== Views on transgender people ===
Navratilova is a vocal critic of allowing transgender women to compete in women's sports, describing them as "failed male athletes". She rejects accusations of transphobia, and says she deplores "a growing tendency among transgender activists to denounce anyone who argues against them and to label them all as 'transphobes.'" Following an article on the subject that Navratilova wrote for The Times in February 2019, Athlete Ally, an LGBTQ athlete advocacy group, removed Navratilova from their advisory board, stating her comments "are transphobic [and] based on a false understanding of science and data".

In March 2019, Navratilova apologized for using the term "cheating" when discussing whether transgender athletes should be allowed to compete in women's sport. She also called for "a debate, a conversation that includes everyone and is based, as I have said, not on feeling or emotion but science."

In an April 2019 article for The Washington Post, she opined that the Equality Act, in its current form, "would make it unlawful to differentiate among girls and women in sports on the basis of sex for any purpose".

In June 2019, the BBC broadcast "The Trans Women Athlete Dispute with Martina Navratilova", where she interviewed people including trans women athletes and sports researchers, presenting evidence on both sides of the debate of whether trans women have any advantage in elite sports. Her closing remarks were:

"The way I started this journey, I just wanted to see if there are any big surprises, any misconceptions that I had.

And what I think I have come to realise, the biggest thing for me, is just that the level of difficulty that trans people go through cannot be underestimated. The fight for equality and recognition is just huge. That being said, still, for me, the most important thing in sports...and you have to remember, trans rights and elite sports are two different things, although of course they are connected. What's the right way to set rules so that everybody feels like they have a fighting chance? It feels to me that it is impossible to come to any real conclusions or write any meaningful rules until more research is done.

"But for now, I think we need to include as many transgender athletes as possible within elite sports, while keeping it as level a playing field as possible. Look, society has changed so much. Things evolve, things change and maybe I need to evolve, I need to change. The rules certainly need to evolve. If you don't adapt, you've got problems. And so we'll just keep adapting and try to find a happy way forward."

In August 2020, Navratilova, along with 300+ women, signed a letter to the National Collegiate Athletic Association in support of an Idaho law that bans trans women student athletes from competing in female sports.

In 2021, Navratilova became a leader of the Women's Sports Policy Working Group, formed in response to US President Joe Biden's Executive Order 13988 mandate that offered blanket inclusion for all trans women athletes. The stated goal of the group is "protecting girls and women in competitive sports categories, while, wherever possible, crafting accommodations for trans athletes into sport."

In April 2023, Navratilova supported a boycott of Nike because it had entered into a corporate sponsorship with Dylan Mulvaney, a transgender woman, to advertise a sports bra.

In October 2023, Navratilova criticized US Secretary of the Interior Deb Haaland's interview of environmentalist drag queen Pattie Gonia outside New York's Stonewall National Monument, calling the performer a "pathetic parody of women."

Navratilova has repeatedly condemned the International Olympic Committee for allowing Imane Khelif to box in the 2024 Summer Olympics, on account of Navratilova's belief that Khelif is male, not female.

== Career statistics ==
=== Grand Slam singles finals: 32 (18–14) ===
By winning the 1983 US Open title, Navratilova completed the career Grand Slam, becoming only the seventh woman in history to achieve it.

Result	Year	Championship	Surface	Opponent	Score
Loss	1975	Australian Open	Grass	(Australia) Evonne Goolagong	3–6, 2–6
Loss	1975	French Open	Clay	(United States) Chris Evert	6–2, 2–6, 1–6
Win	1978	Wimbledon	Grass	(United States) Chris Evert	2–6, 6–4, 7–5
Win	1979	Wimbledon (2)	Grass	(United States) Chris Evert	6–4, 6–4
Loss	1981	US Open	Hard	(United States) Tracy Austin	6–1, 6–7^{(4–7)}, 6–7^{(1–7)}
Win	1981	Australian Open	Grass	(United States) Chris Evert	6–7^{(4–7)}, 6–4, 7–5
Win	1982	French Open	Clay	(United States) Andrea Jaeger	7–6^{(8–6)}, 6–1
Win	1982	Wimbledon (3)	Grass	(United States) Chris Evert	6–1, 3–6, 6–2
Loss	1982	Australian Open	Grass	(United States) Chris Evert	3–6, 6–2, 3–6
Win	1983	Wimbledon (4)	Grass	(United States) Andrea Jaeger	6–0, 6–3
Win	1983	US Open	Hard	(United States) Chris Evert	6–1, 6–3
Win	1983	Australian Open (2)	Grass	(United States) Kathy Jordan	6–2, 7–6^{(7–5)}
Win	1984	French Open (2)	Clay	(United States) Chris Evert	6–3, 6–1
Win	1984	Wimbledon (5)	Grass	(United States) Chris Evert	7–6^{(7–5)}, 6–2
Win	1984	US Open (2)	Hard	(United States) Chris Evert	4–6, 6–4, 6–4
Loss	1985	French Open	Clay	(United States) Chris Evert	3–6, 7–6^{(7–4)}, 5–7
Win	1985	Wimbledon (6)	Grass	(United States) Chris Evert	4–6, 6–3, 6–2
Loss	1985	US Open	Hard	(Czechoslovakia) Hana Mandlíková	6–7^{(3–7)}, 6–1, 6–7^{(2–7)}
Win	1985	Australian Open (3)	Grass	(United States) Chris Evert	6–2, 4–6, 6–2
Loss	1986	French Open	Clay	(United States) Chris Evert	6–2, 3–6, 3–6
Win	1986	Wimbledon (7)	Grass	(Czechoslovakia) Hana Mandlíková	7–6^{(7–1)}, 6–3
Win	1986	US Open (3)	Hard	(Czechoslovakia) Helena Suková	6–3, 6–2
Loss	1987	Australian Open	Grass	(Czechoslovakia) Hana Mandlíková	5–7, 6–7^{(1–7)}
Loss	1987	French Open	Clay	(West Germany) Steffi Graf	4–6, 6–4, 6–8
Win	1987	Wimbledon (8)	Grass	(West Germany) Steffi Graf	7–5, 6–3
Win	1987	US Open (4)	Hard	(West Germany) Steffi Graf	7–6^{(7–4)}, 6–1
Loss	1988	Wimbledon	Grass	(West Germany) Steffi Graf	7–5, 2–6, 1–6
Loss	1989	Wimbledon	Grass	(West Germany) Steffi Graf	2–6, 7–6^{(7–1)}, 1–6
Loss	1989	US Open	Hard	(West Germany) Steffi Graf	6–3, 5–7, 1–6
Win	1990	Wimbledon (9)	Grass	(United States) Zina Garrison	6–4, 6–1
Loss	1991	US Open	Hard	(Socialist Federal Republic of Yugoslavia) Monica Seles	6–7^{(1–7)}, 1–6
Loss	1994	Wimbledon	Grass	(Spain) Conchita Martínez	4–6, 6–3, 3–6

=== Performance timelines ===
Key
**W**	F	SF	QF	#R	RR	Q#	DNQ	A	NH

(W) winner; (F) finalist; (SF) semifinalist; (QF) quarterfinalist; (#R) rounds 4, 3, 2, 1; (RR) round-robin stage; (Q#) qualification round; (DNQ) did not qualify; (A) absent; (NH) not held; (SR) strike rate (events won / competed); (W–L) win–loss record.

==== Singles ====
	Czechoslovakia			United States																								
Tournament	1973	1974	1975	1976	1977		1978	1979	1980	1981	1982	1983	1984	1985	1986	1987	1988	1989	1990	1991	1992	1993	1994	1995–2003	2004	SR	W–L	Win %
Australian Open	A	A	F	A	A	A	A	A	SF	**W**	F	**W**	SF	**W**	NH	F	SF	QF	A	A	A	A	A	A	A	3 / 10	46–7	87%
French Open	QF	QF	F	A	A		A	A	A	QF	**W**	4R	**W**	F	F	F	4R	A	A	A	A	A	1R	A	1R	2 / 13	51–11	82%
Wimbledon	3R	1R	QF	SF	QF		**W**	**W**	SF	SF	**W**	**W**	**W**	**W**	**W**	**W**	F	F	**W**	QF	SF	SF	F	A	2R	9 / 23	120–14	90%
US Open	1R	3R	SF	1R	SF		SF	SF	4R	F	QF	**W**	**W**	F	**W**	**W**	QF	F	4R	F	2R	4R	A	A	A	4 / 21	89–17	84%
**Win–loss**	**5–3**	**5–3**	**17–4**	**5–2**	**9–2**		**11–1**	**11–1**	**11–3**	**19–3**	**20–2**	**23–1**	**25–1**	**25–2**	**20–1**	**25–2**	**18–4**	**16–3**	**10–1**	**10–2**	**6–2**	**8–2**	**6–2**	−	**1–2**	**18 / 67**	**306–49**	**86%**

==== Doubles ====
	Czechoslovakia			United States																														
Tournament	1973	1974	1975	1976	1977		1978	1979	1980	1981	1982	1983	1984	1985	1986	1987	1988	1989	1990	1991	1992	1993	1994	1995	1996–99	2000	2001	2002	2003	2004	2005	2006	SR	Win %
Australian Open	A	A	1R	A	A	A	A	A	**W**	F	**W**	**W**	**W**	**W**	NH	**W**	**W**	**W**	A	A	A	A	A	A	A	A	A	A	A	A	A	A	8 / 10	80%
French Open	QF	SF	**W**	A	A		A	A	A	SF	**W**	A	**W**	**W**	**W**	**W**	**W**	A	A	A	A	A	3R	A	A	3R	1R	1R	3R	A	A	A	7 / 15	47%
Wimbledon	1R	1R	QF	**W**	F		QF	**W**	SF	**W**	**W**	**W**	**W**	F	**W**	QF	3R	SF	QF	SF	SF	A	SF	A	A	QF	QF	2R	QF	SF	SF	QF	7 / 28	25%
US Open	1R	QF	SF	A	**W**		**W**	F	**W**	SF	SF	**W**	**W**	F	**W**	**W**	SF	**W**	**W**	3R	SF	A	A	2R	A	3R	QF	3R	F	QF	SF	QF	9 / 27	33%

==== Mixed doubles ====
	Czechoslovakia			United States																									
Tournament	1973	1974	1975	1976	1977		1978	1979	1980–83	1984	1985	1986	1987	1988	1989–92	1993	1994	1995	1996	1997–99	2000	2001	2002	2003	2004	2005	2006	SR	Win %
Australian Open	NH	NH	NH	NH	NH	NH	NH	NH	NH	NH	NH	NH	SF	F	A	A	A	A	A	A	A	A	A	**W**	F	SF	A	1 / 5	20%
French Open	A	**W**	A	A	A		A	A	A	A	**W**	QF	QF	SF	A	A	3R	A	A	A	2R	2R	A	2R	2R	F	SF	2 / 12	17%
Wimbledon	QF	3R	SF	2R	SF		A	A	A	QF	**W**	F	A	QF	A	**W**	A	**W**	QF	A	1R	2R	2R	**W**	3R	QF	3R	4 / 19	21%
US Open	A	2R	A	A	A		A	SF	A	A	**W**	F	**W**	A	A	F	A	QF	A	A	2R	1R	2R	A	SF	QF	**W**	3/13	23%

=== Records ===
- These are Open Era tennis records.
- Records in **bold** indicate peer-less achievements.

Time span	Selected Grand Slam tournament records	Players matched
1974 French Open — 2003 Australian Open	Career Boxed Set^{[a]}	Margaret Court^{[b]}
1974 French Open — 2006 US Open	59 combined titles^{[c]}	**Stands alone**^{[d]}
1974 French Open — 2006 US Open	41 combined doubles titles (same sex & mixed)	**Stands alone**
1975 French Open — 1990 US Open	31 doubles titles (same sex)	**Stands alone**
1975 French Open — 1990 US Open	7+ doubles titles at all four Majors	**Stands alone**
1983 Wimbledon — 1990 Wimbledon	6 titles won without losing a set	Serena Williams
1983 Wimbledon — 1984 US Open	6 consecutive Grand Slams won^{[e]}	Margaret Court
1983 Wimbledon — 1988 Australian Open	18 consecutive singles semifinals^{[f]}	**Stands alone**
1978 Wimbledon — 1990 Wimbledon	Winner of Grand Slam singles titles in three decades	Serena Williams
1974 French Open — 2006 US Open	Winner of Grand Slam titles (singles, doubles and mixed) in four decades	**Stands alone**
1983 Wimbledon — 1983 US Open	2 titles won without losing a set in the same calendar year	Billie Jean King; Steffi Graf; Martina Hingis; Serena Williams; Justine Henin

Grand Slam tournaments	Time span	Records at each Grand Slam tournament	Players matched
French Open	1984–1987	4 consecutive singles finals	Chris Evert; Steffi Graf
Wimbledon	1978–1990	9 singles titles overall	**Stands alone**
Wimbledon	1982–1987	6 consecutive singles titles	**Stands alone**
Wimbledon	1976–1990	7+ titles overall in both singles and doubles	**Stands alone**
Wimbledon	1978–1994	12 singles finals overall	**Stands alone**
Wimbledon	1982–1990	9 consecutive singles finals	**Stands alone**
Wimbledon	1983–1984, 1986, 1990	4 titles won without losing a set	**Stands alone**
Wimbledon	1973–2004	120 match wins overall	**Stands alone**
US Open	1987	Singles, doubles and mixed doubles titles at same Grand Slam event (triple crown)	Margaret Court Billie Jean King

Time span	Other selected records	Players matched
1978–1992	8 WTA Tour Championships titles overall	**Stands alone**
1984, 1985	2 Tour Championships titles without losing a set	Serena Williams
1978–1992	14 Tour Championships finals overall	**Stands alone**
1975–1992	16 Tour Championships semifinals	**Stands alone**
1974–1993	60 Tour Championships match wins	**Stands alone**
1974–1994	21 Tour Championships appearances	**Stands alone**
1974–1985	7 Orlando singles titles	**Stands alone**
1975–1996	5 US Indoors singles titles	**Stands alone**
1975–1990	9 Washington singles titles	**Stands alone**
1978–1993	8 Los Angeles singles titles	**Stands alone**
1978–1992	12 Chicago singles titles	**Stands alone**
1978–1993	11 Eastbourne singles titles	**Stands alone**
1979–1990	9 Dallas singles titles	**Stands alone**
1974–1994	167 singles titles	**Stands alone**
1974–2006	177 doubles titles	**Stands alone**
1974–2006	359 combined titles	**Stands alone**
1973–1994	239 singles finals reached	**Stands alone**
1974–2006	1661 matches played	**Stands alone**
1974–2006	1442 matches won	**Stands alone**
1974–1993	93 career indoor titles	**Stands alone**
1984	13 consecutive titles in 1 season	**Stands alone**
1975–1995	21 consecutive years winning 1+ title	**Stands alone**
1983–1984	23 consecutive finals	**Stands alone**
1974–2006	390 career tournaments played	**Stands alone**
1975–2006	305 grass court match wins	**Stands alone**
1973–1994	512 carpet court match wins	**Stands alone**
1973–1994	605 indoor court match wins	**Stands alone**
1973–1994	755 outdoor court match wins	**Stands alone**
1983	98.9% (86–1) single season match winning percentage	**Stands alone**
1984	74 consecutive matches won	**Stands alone**
1973–1994	89.99% (576–58) carpet court match winning percentage	**Stands alone**
1973–1994	61 singles finals against same player (Chris Evert, 36–25)	Chris Evert
1973–1994	80 matches against same player (Chris Evert, 43–37)	Chris Evert
1982–1986	5 consecutive years ended at No. 1 (singles)	**Stands alone**
1973–1994	18 match wins against No. 1 ranked player	**Stands alone**
1975, 1978–1993	17 years with winning percentage 80%+	Serena Williams
1978–1993	16 consecutive years with winning percentage 80%+	**Stands alone**
1978–1992	12 titles at a single tournament (Chicago)	**Stands alone**
1978–1993	11+ titles at two different tournaments (Chicago, Eastbourne)	**Stands alone**
1975–1993	8+ titles at seven different tournaments	**Stands alone**
1975–1993	14 finals at two different tournaments (Chicago, WTA Finals)	**Stands alone**
1975–1994	11+ finals at seven different tournaments	**Stands alone**

== Awards ==
AP Female Athlete of the Year 1983 and 1984

- ITF World Champion 1979, 1982, 1983, 1984, 1985, 1986.
- WTA Player of the Year 1978, 1979, 1982, 1983, 1984, 1985, 1986.
- BBC Sports Personality of the Year Lifetime Achievement Award 2003
- Czech Sport Legend Award 2006
- BBC's 100 women 2013

== Recognition ==
Navratilova is considered one of the best female tennis players of all time and in 2005, Tennis magazine selected her as the greatest female tennis player for the years 1965 through 2005, directly over Steffi Graf. Billie Jean King, a former World No. 1 player, said in 2006 that Navratilova is "the greatest singles, doubles and mixed doubles player who's ever lived." In 2008, tennis historian and journalist Bud Collins called Navratilova "arguably, the greatest player of all time."

In 2000, she became a member of the Laureus Sports Foundation's Academy.

In 2006, Martina Navratilova was named by Equality Forum as one of their 31 Icons of the LGBT History Month.

Tennis writer Steve Flink, in his book The Greatest Tennis Matches of the Twentieth Century (1999), named her as the second best female player of the 20th century, directly behind Steffi Graf.

In 2009, Navratilova was awarded the International Tennis Federation's (ITF) highest accolade, the Philippe Chatrier Award, for her contributions to tennis both on and off the court.

In June 2011, she was named one of the "30 Legends of Women's Tennis: Past, Present and Future" by Time.

In March 2012, The Tennis Channel named Navratilova as the second greatest female tennis player of all times, behind Steffi Graf, in their list of 100 greatest tennis players of all times.

On August 2, 2013, Navratilova was among the first class of inductees into the National Gay and Lesbian Sports Hall of Fame.

On May 12, 2016, Navratilova was made an honorary fellow of Lucy Cavendish College of the University of Cambridge.

On 28 October 2025, Navratilova was awarded Order of the White Lion, III Class by Czech President Petr Pavel.

== Media ==
In 1983, Martina Navratilova and Vijay Amritraj appeared in the Hart to Hart episode "Love Game" as themselves, as the guests of honor at a charity tennis event. Her role was the more significant; she partnered with the lead male character Jonathan Hart (Robert Wagner) in a mixed doubles match. Though a homage rather than an appearance, in 1992 Navratilova was mentioned by the titular character in episode 14 of the anime Pretty Soldier Sailor Moon. In 1996, Navratilova was featured with American football player Art Monk in an endorsement for PowerBook in an ad series "What's on Your PowerBook?" In 2000 Martina appeared as herself on Will & Grace "Lows in the Mid-Eighties" as one of Karen Walker's (Megan Mullally) paramours in a flashback sequence.'

In September 2001, Martina Navratilova appeared as a contestant on the "Sports Superstars Millionaire" edition of Who Wants to Be a Millionaire. She won $125,000 for Save the Rhino, a UK-based conservation charity.

In November 2008, Martina Navratilova appeared on the UK's ITV series Series 8 of I'm a Celebrity ... Get Me Out of Here!; she finished runner-up to Joe Swash. In February 2012, Navratilova was announced as a cast member on the 14th season of ABC's Dancing with the Stars. She was partnered with Tony Dovolani, but they were the first pair eliminated. Navratilova guest-starred as a dissatisfied Yelp reviewer in episode three of the third season of absurdist comedy Portlandia. In 2019, Navratilova had a recurring role portraying Brigitte, a horse trainer, in the Netflix series, The Politician.

In 2018, it was reported that Glenn Greenwald was developing a feature-length documentary about Navratilova with Reese Witherspoon's production company, Hello Sunshine. Greenwald described Navratilova as his childhood hero and as a social justice pioneer. During an interview at the Salesforce World Tour London 2024 event, Navratilova confirmed that a documentary was currently being filmed with her and Chris Evert, and would be released in 2025.

In 2026, she participated in the Antena 3 television show Mask Singer: Adivina quién canta, under the mask of Mop.

== Bibliography ==
Navratilova has written a number of books on tennis, as well as a few mysteries.

=== Nonfiction ===
No.	Title	Publisher	Date	Genre	Length	ISBN		
1	Tennis My Way	Martina Navratilova	Penguin Books	September 4, 1984	Tennis	Sports:Tennis	215 pp (first edition)	978-0140071832
2	Martina	Martina Navratilova, George Vecsey	Knopf	May 12, 1985	Martina Navratilova	Autobiography	287 pp (Revised edition)	978-0394536408
3	Martina	Martina Navratilova, George Vecsey	Fawcett Publications	May 12, 1986	Martina Navratilova	Autobiography	336 pp (Revised edition)	978-0449209820
3	Martina Navratilova: Being Myself	Martina Navratilova, George Vecsey	HarperCollins	June 26, 1986	Martina Navratilova	Autobiography	336 pp (New Ed edition)	978-0586069226
3	Shape Your Self: My 6-Step Diet and Fitness Plan to Achieve the Best Shape of Your Life	Martina Navratilova	Rodale Books	March 21, 2006	Martina Navratilova	Self-help	256 pp (1st edition)	978-1594862823
4	Crisis : 40 Stories Revealing the Personal, Social, and Religious Pain and Trauma of Growing up Gay in America	Martina Navratilova	Greenleaf Book Group	September 2008	Mindy Drucker, Martina Navratilova	Self-help	370 pp (1st edition)	978-1929774104

=== Fiction ===
No.	Title	Publisher	Date	Genre	Length	ISBN		
1	The Total Zone	Martina Navratilova and Liz Nickles	Villard Books	August 16, 1994	Jordan Myles Mystery	Mystery:Detective	302 pp (1st edition)	978-0679433903
2	Breaking Point	Martina Navratilova and Liz Nickles	Ballantine Books	May 28, 1997	Jordan Myles Mystery	Mystery:Detective	326 pp (Reprint edition)	978-0345388681
3	Killer Instinct	Martina Navratilova	Villard Books	August 19, 1997	Jordan Myles Mystery	Mystery:Detective	290 pp (1st edition)	978-0679433927

== See also ==
- WTA Tour records
- Grand Slam (tennis)
- List of WTA number 1 ranked singles tennis players
- List of WTA number 1 ranked doubles tennis players
- List of female tennis players
- List of tennis tournaments
- List of tennis rivalries
- Tennis records of the Open Era – Women's singles
- All-time tennis records – women's singles
- Graf–Navratilova rivalry
- Evert–Navratilova rivalry
- List of Soviet and Eastern Bloc defectors
- Homosexuality in sports in the United States

== Notes ==
- ^{a} A Career Boxed Set entails winning all 4 Majors in singles, same sex doubles and mixed doubles.
- ^{b} Doris Hart also holds these records; however, she attained these in the pre-Open Era.
- ^{c} "Combined" refers to singles, same sex doubles and mixed doubles titles.
- ^{d} Margaret Court holds 62 titles; however, she attained part of these in the pre-Open Era.
- ^{e} The Australian Open was held in December, so although Navratilova won 6 straight majors from Wimbledon 1983, she did not technically complete the calendar-year Grand Slam.
- ^{f} Chris Evert reached 34 consecutive Grand Slam singles semifinals from the 1971 US Open to the 1983 French Open, but this was attained in non-consecutive Grand Slam tournaments. She skipped 14 Grand Slam tournaments during her streak.

Sporting positions
Preceded by Chris Evert; Chris Evert; Chris Evert; Chris Evert; Tracy Austin; Chris Evert; Chris Evert; Chris Evert; Chris Evert	World No. 1 July 10, 1978 – January 13, 1979; January 28, 1979 – February 24, 1979; April 16, 1979 – June 24, 1979; September 10, 1979 – April 6, 1980; April 21, 1980 – June 30, 1980; May 3, 1982 – May 16, 1982; June 14, 1982 – June 9, 1985; October 14, 1985 – October 27, 1985; November 25, 1985 – August 16, 1987	Succeeded by Chris Evert; Chris Evert; Chris Evert; Tracy Austin; Tracy Austin; Chris Evert; Chris Evert; Chris Evert; Steffi Graf
Awards and achievements
Preceded by Chris Evert; Chris Evert	ITF World Champion; 1979; 1982–1986	Succeeded by Chris Evert; Steffi Graf
Preceded by Jarmila Kratochvílová	United Press International; Athlete of the Year; 1984	Succeeded by Mary Decker Slaney
Preceded by Greg Norman	BBC Overseas Sports Personality of the Year; 1987	Succeeded by Steffi Graf
Preceded by none	Flo Hyman Memorial Award; 1987	Succeeded by Jackie Joyner-Kersee
Preceded by Javier Sotomayor	Prince of Asturias Award for Sports; 1994	Succeeded by Hassiba Boulmerka
