= 1987 US Open (tennis) =

- Date: September 1 – September 14
- Edition: 107th
- Category: Grand Slam (ITF)
- Surface: Hardcourt
- Location: New York City, New York, United States

Champions

Men's singles
- (Czechoslovakia) Ivan Lendl

Women's singles
- (United States) Martina Navratilova

Men's doubles
- (Sweden) Stefan Edberg / (Sweden) Anders Järryd

Women's doubles
- (United States) Martina Navratilova / (United States) Pam Shriver

Mixed doubles
- (United States) Martina Navratilova / (Spain) Emilio Sánchez

Boys' singles
- (United States) David Wheaton

Girls' singles
- (Soviet Union) Natasha Zvereva

Boys' doubles
- (Socialist Federal Republic of Yugoslavia) Goran Ivanišević / (Italy) Diego Nargiso

Girls' doubles
- (United States) Meredith McGrath / (United States) Kimberly Po
- US Open

The 1987 US Open was a tennis tournament played on outdoor hard courts at the USTA National Tennis Center in New York City. It was the 107th edition of the US Open and was held from September 1 to September 14, 1987. As of 2024, it is the last time any player, male or female, has won the Triple Crown as Martina Navratilova won the Women's Singles, Women's Doubles and Mixed Doubles events.

The men's final was played on Monday, September 14, after rain washed out the play on Sunday, September 13.

== Seniors ==
=== Men's singles ===
(Czechoslovakia) Ivan Lendl defeated (Sweden) Mats Wilander 6–7^{(7–9)}, 6–0, 7–6^{(7–4)}, 6–4

- It was Lendl's 6th career Grand Slam title and his 3rd and final US Open title.

=== Women's singles ===
(United States) Martina Navratilova defeated (West Germany) Steffi Graf 7–6^{(7–4)}, 6–1

- It was Navratilova's 46th career Grand Slam title and her 11th US Open title.

=== Men's doubles ===
(Sweden) Stefan Edberg / (Sweden) Anders Järryd defeated (United States) Ken Flach / (United States) Robert Seguso 7–6^{(7–1)}, 6–2, 4–6, 5–7, 7–6^{(7–2)}

- It was Edberg's 4th career Grand Slam title and his 1st US Open title. It was Järryd's 4th career Grand Slam title and his 1st US Open title.

=== Women's doubles ===
(United States) Martina Navratilova / (United States) Pam Shriver defeated (United States) Kathy Jordan / (Australia) Elizabeth Smylie 5–7, 6–4, 6–2

- It was Navratilova's 47th career Grand Slam title and her 12th US Open title. It was Shriver's 18th career Grand Slam title and her 4th US Open title.

=== Mixed doubles ===
(United States) Martina Navratilova / (Spain) Emilio Sánchez defeated (United States) Betsy Nagelsen / (United States) Paul Annacone 6–4, 6–7^{(6–8)}, 7–6^{(14–12)}

- It was Navratilova's 48th career Grand Slam title and her 13th US Open title. It was Sánchez's 2nd career Grand Slam title and his 1st US Open title. Navratilova became only the third player in the Open Era to win the Triple Crown, winning the singles, women's doubles, and mixed doubles events at the same Grand Slam.

== Juniors ==
=== Boys' singles ===
(United States) David Wheaton defeated (Soviet Union) Andrei Cherkasov 7–6, 6–0

=== Girls' singles ===
(Soviet Union) Natasha Zvereva defeated (United States) Sandra Birch 6–0, 6–3

=== Boys' doubles ===
(Socialist Federal Republic of Yugoslavia) Goran Ivanišević / (Italy) Diego Nargiso defeated (India) Zeeshan Ali / (New Zealand) Brett Steven 3–6, 6–4, 6–3

=== Girls' doubles ===
(United States) Meredith McGrath / (United States) Kimberly Po defeated (South Korea) Kim Il-soon / (Chinese Taipei) Wang Shi-ting 6–4, 7–5

== Prize money ==
Event		W	F	SF	QF	4R	3R	2R	1R
Singles	Men	$250,000	$125,000	$62,500	$31,667	$16,167	$9,333	$5,502	$3,353
Singles	Women	$250,000	$125,000	$62,500	$31,667	$16,167	$9,333	$5,502	$3,353

Total prize money for the event was $3,979,294.

Preceded by 1987 Wimbledon Championships	Grand Slams	Succeeded by 1988 Australian Open
