= Kateřina Skronská =

Czechoslovak tennis player

- Full name: Kateřina Böhmová-Skronská
- Country (sports): Czechoslovakia
- Born: 22 January 1958 (age 67)

Singles
- Career record: -
- Highest ranking: No. 239 (16 February 1987)

Grand Slam singles results
- Australian Open: 2R (1985)
- French Open: 2R (1983, 1985)
- Wimbledon: 1R (1983, 84, 85, 86, 87)
- US Open: 2R (1984, 1985)

Doubles
- Career record: -
- Highest ranking: No. 162 (16 February 1987)

Grand Slam doubles results
- Australian Open: 1R (1981, 1985)
- French Open: QF (1985)
- Wimbledon: 2R (1986)
- US Open: 2R (1981, 1987)

Kateřina Skronská (born 22 January 1958) is a former professional tennis player from Czechoslovakia. After her marriage with Czech basketball player Zdeněk Böhm she became known as Kateřina Böhmová-Skronská.

She is the mother of former pro tennis player Kateřina Klapková-Böhmová.
