= 1984 in tennis =

This page covers all the important events in the sport of tennis in 1984. It provides the results of notable tournaments throughout the year on both the men's and the women's tennis circuits, the Davis Cup, and the Federation Cup.

== Australian Open ==
Category	Champion(s)	Finalist(s)	Score
Men's singles	(Sweden) Mats Wilander	(South Africa) Kevin Curren	6–7^{(5–7)}, 6–4, 7–6^{(7–3)}, 6–2 (Note: It was Wilander's 3rd career Grand Slam title and his 2nd Australian Open title.)
Women's singles	(United States) Chris Evert	(Czechoslovakia) Helena Suková	6–7^{(4–7)}, 6–1, 6–3 (Note: It was Evert's 16th career Grand Slam title and her 2nd and last Australian Open title.)
Men's doubles	(Australia) Mark Edmondson (United States) Sherwood Stewart	(Sweden) Joakim Nyström (Sweden) Mats Wilander	6–2, 6–2, 7–5 (Note: It was Edmondson's 5th career Grand Slam title and his 5th and last Australian Open title. It was Stewart's 3rd career Grand Slam title and his 1st Australian Open title.)
Women's doubles	(United States) Martina Navratilova (United States) Pam Shriver	(West Germany) Claudia Kohde-Kilsch (Czechoslovakia) Helena Suková	6–3, 6–4 (Note: It was Navratilova's 30th career Grand Slam title and her 6th Australian Open title. It was Shriver's 10th career Grand Slam title and her 3rd Australian Open title. With this victory Navratilova and Shriver completed the first doubles Grand Slam in a calendar year in the Open Era, a feat not matched until Martina Hingis completed the same Grand Slam with two partners in 1998.)
Mixed doubles	The competition was not held between 1970 and 1986.		

== French Open ==
Category	Champion(s)	Finalist(s)	Score
Men's singles	(Czechoslovakia) Ivan Lendl	(United States) John McEnroe	3–6, 2–6, 6–4, 7–5, 7–5 (Note: It was Lendl's first career Grand Slam title.)
Women's singles	(United States) Martina Navratilova	(United States) Chris Evert	6–3, 6–1 (Note: It was Navratilova's ninth career Grand Slam title, and her second (and last) French Open title.)
Men's doubles	(France) Henri Leconte (France) Yannick Noah	(Czechoslovakia) Pavel Složil (Czechoslovakia) Tomáš Šmíd	6–4, 2–6, 3–6, 6–3, 6–2
Women's doubles	(United States) Martina Navratilova (United States) Pam Shriver	(West Germany) Claudia Kohde-Kilsch (Czechoslovakia) Hana Mandlíková	5–7, 6–3, 6–2
Mixed doubles	(United States) Anne Smith (United States) Dick Stockton	(Australia) Anne Minter (Australia) Laurie Warder	6–2, 6–4

== Wimbledon ==
In all five senior disciplines, the 1983 champions successfully defended their titles.

Category	Champion(s)	Finalist(s)	Score
Men's singles	(United States) John McEnroe	(United States) Jimmy Connors	6–1, 6–1, 6–2 (Note: It was McEnroe's 6th career Grand Slam singles title and his third Wimbledon singles title.)
Women's singles	(United States) Martina Navratilova	(United States) Chris Evert Lloyd	7–6^{(7–5)}, 6–2 (Note: It was Navratilova's 26th career Grand Slam title and her 5th Wimbledon singles title.)
Men's doubles	(United States) Peter Fleming (United States) John McEnroe	(Australia) Pat Cash (Australia) Paul McNamee	6–2, 5–7, 6–2, 3–6, 6–3 (Note: It was Fleming's 7th career Grand Slam title and his fourth and last Wimbledon title. It was McEnroe's 14th career Grand Slam title and his 7th Wimbledon singles or doubles title.)
Women's doubles	(United States) Martina Navratilova (United States) Pam Shriver	(United States) Kathy Jordan (United States) Anne Smith	6–3, 6–4 (Note: It was Navratilova's 27th career Grand Slam title and her 11th Wimbledon title. It was Shriver's 8th career Grand Slam title and her 4th Wimbledon title.)
Mixed doubles	(United Kingdom) John Lloyd (Australia) Wendy Turnbull	(United States) Steve Denton (United States) Kathy Jordan	6–3, 6–3 (Note: It was Lloyd's 3rd and last career Grand Slam title and his 2nd Wimbledon title. It was Turnbull's 9th and last career Grand Slam title and her 3rd Wimbledon title.)

== US Open ==
Category	Champion(s)	Finalist(s)	Score
Men's singles	(United States) John McEnroe	(Czechoslovakia) Ivan Lendl	6–3, 6–4, 6–1 (Note: It was McEnroe's fourth US Open title and the last Grand Slam title.)
Women's singles	(United States) Martina Navratilova	(United States) Chris Evert-Lloyd	4–6, 6–4, 6–4 (Note: It was Navratilova's 18th career Grand Slam title and her 4th US Open title.)
Men's doubles	(Australia) John Fitzgerald (Czechoslovakia) Tomáš Šmíd	(Sweden) Stefan Edberg (Sweden) Anders Järryd	7–6^{(7–5)}, 6–3, 6–3 (Note: It was Fitzgerald's 3rd career Grand Slam title and his 2nd US Open title. It was Šmíd's 1st career Grand Slam title and his only US Open title.)
Women's doubles	(United States) Martina Navratilova (United States) Pam Shriver	(United Kingdom) Anne Hobbs (Australia) Wendy Turnbull	6–2, 6–4 (Note: It was Navratilova's 29th career Grand Slam title and her 7th US Open title. It was Shriver's 9th career Grand Slam title and her 2nd US Open title.)
Mixed doubles	(Bulgaria) Manuela Maleeva (United States) Tom Gullikson	(Australia) Elizabeth Sayers (Australia) John Fitzgerald	2–6, 7–5, 6–4 (Note: It was Maleeva's only career Grand Slam title. It was Gullikson's only career Grand Slam title.)

== Davis Cup ==
First round 24–26 February
Perth, Australia (grass)
Australia	5
Yugoslavia	0
Telford, United Kingdom (indoor carpet)
Italy	3
Great Britain	2
Stuttgart, West Germany (indoor carpet)
Argentina	4
West Germany	1
Bucharest, Romania (indoor carpet)
United States	5
Romania	0
Hradec Králové, Czechoslovakia (indoor carpet)
Denmark	0
Czechoslovakia	5
New Delhi, India (grass)
India	1
France	4
Christchurch, New Zealand (grass)
Paraguay	3
New Zealand	2
Norrköping, Sweden (indoor carpet)
Ecuador	1
Sweden	4

Quarterfinals; 13–15 July
Brisbane, Australia (grass)
Australia	5
Italy	0
Atlanta, GA, United States (indoor carpet)
Argentina	0
United States	5
Hradec Králové, Czechoslovakia (indoor carpet)
Czechoslovakia	3
France	2
Båstad, Sweden (clay)
Paraguay	1
Sweden	4

Semifinals; 28–30 September
Portland, OR, United States (indoor carpet)
Australia	1
United States	4
Båstad, Sweden (clay)
Czechoslovakia	0
Sweden	5

Final; 16–18 December
Gothenburg, Sweden (indoor clay)
United States	1
Sweden	4

== Fed Cup ==
First Round
Czechoslovakia	3
Q	Venezuela	0
Japan	1
Greece	2
France	2
Netherlands	1
Denmark	2
Q	Chile	1
Yugoslavia	3
Q	South Korea	0
Israel	3
Peru	0
Soviet Union	3
Uruguay	0
Bulgaria	3
Great Britain	0
United States	3
Mexico	0
Hungary	1
Switzerland	2
Spain	0
Austria	3
Canada	1
Italy	2
Australia	3
Argentina	0
Q	Colombia	1
Belgium	2
Sweden	2
Brazil	1
China	0
West Germany	3

Second Round
Czechoslovakia	3
Greece	0
France	3
Denmark	0
Yugoslavia	3
Israel	0
Soviet Union	1
Bulgaria	2
United States	2
Switzerland	1
Austria	0
Italy	2
Australia	3
Belgium	0
Sweden	1
West Germany	2

Quarterfinals
Czechoslovakia	3
France	0
Yugoslavia	2
Bulgaria	1
United States	2
Italy	1
Australia	2
West Germany	1

Semifinals
Czechoslovakia	3
Yugoslavia	0
United States	1
Australia	2

Final
Czechoslovakia	2
Australia	1
