= 1987 Rye Brook Open =

- Date: August 24–31
- Edition: 1st
- Category: Grand Prix
- Draw: 32S / 16D
- Prize money: $89,400
- Surface: Hard / outdoor
- Location: Rye Brook, New York, U.S.

Champions

Singles
- (Sweden) Peter Lundgren

Doubles
- (United States) Lloyd Bourne / (United States) Jeff Klaparda
- Rye Brook Open

The 1987 Rye Brook Open was a men's tennis tournament played on outdoor hard courts that was part of the 1987 Nabisco Grand Prix. It was played at Rye Brook, New York in the United States from August 24 through August 31, 1987. Unseeded Peter Lundgren won the singles title.

== Finals ==
=== Singles ===
(Sweden) Peter Lundgren defeated (United States) John Ross 6–7, 7–5, 6–3

- It was Lundgren's 1st singles title of the year and the 2nd of his career.

=== Doubles ===
(United States) Lloyd Bourne / (United States) Jeff Klaparda defeated (Australia) Carl Limberger / (Australia) Mark Woodforde 6–3, 6–3

- It was Bourne's only title of the year and the 1st of his career. It was Klaparda's only title of the year and the 1st of his career.
