= 1987 Rye Brook Open – Singles =

Singles
- 1987 Rye Brook Open

Final
- Champion: (Sweden) Peter Lundgren
- Runner-up: (United States) John Ross
- Score: 6–7, 7–5, 6–3

Details
- Draw: 32
- Seeds: 8

Events
Singles	Doubles
- Rye Brook Open

This was the first edition of the event.

Peter Lundgren won the title, defeating John Ross 6–7, 7–5, 6–3 in the final.

== Seeds ==
1. (France) Tarik Benhabiles (first round)
2. (Soviet Union) Andrei Chesnokov (second round)
3. (India) Ramesh Krishnan (semifinals)
4. (Austria) Thomas Muster (quarterfinals)
5. (Peru) Jaime Yzaga (first round)
6. (United States) Dan Goldie (second round)
7. (United States) Matt Anger (first round)
8. (United States) Jim Pugh (second round)

== Draw ==
Key

- Q = Qualifier
- WC = Wild card
- LL = Lucky loser
- Alt = Alternate
- ITF = ITF entry
- PR = Protected ranking
- SR = Special ranking
- SE = Special exempt
- JE = Junior exempt
- JR = Junior Accelerator Programme entrant
- CO = College Accelerator Programme entrant
- NG = Next Gen Accelerator Program entrant
- w/o = Walkover
- r = Retired
- d = Defaulted

=== Finals ===
Semifinals
(United States) Richard Matuszewski	6	6	5
(United States) John Ross	7	4	7
3	(India) Ramesh Krishnan	2	5
(Sweden) Peter Lundgren	6	7

Final
(United States) John Ross	7	5	3
(Sweden) Peter Lundgren	6	7	6

=== Top half ===
First round
1/WC	(France) T Benhabiles	6	3
(Israel) G Bloom	7	6
Q	(United States) M Flur	6	6
(Austria) A Antonitsch	1	4
(United States) B Pearce	4	4
(United States) R Matuszewski	6	6
WC	(United States) M Chang	1	6	0
8	(United States) J Pugh	6	3	6
4	(Austria) T Muster	3	7	6
(Sweden) C Bergström	6	6	3
(United Kingdom) A Castle	4	4
(Australia) C Limberger	6	6
(South Africa) E Edwards	6	7
(Canada) M Wostenholme	4	5
Q	(United States) J Ross	6	6
5	(Peru) J Yzaga	3	2

Second round
(Israel) G Bloom	6	0
Q	(United States) M Flur	7	6
(United States) R Matuszewski	6	6
8	(United States) J Pugh	4	4
4	(Austria) T Muster	7	6
(Australia) C Limberger	6	2
(South Africa) E Edwards	6	3
Q	(United States) J Ross	7	6

Quarterfinals
Q	(United States) M Flur	5	1
(United States) R Matuszewski	7	6
4	(Austria) T Muster	6	3
Q	(United States) J Ross	7	6

Semifinals
(United States) R Matuszewski	6	6	5
Q	(United States) J Ross	7	4	7

=== Bottom half ===
First round
6	(United States) D Goldie	6	6
(Australia) D Cahill	2	2
(United States) J Klaparda	1	2
(Spain) J Sánchez	6	6
(United States) M Kures	7	6
Q	(United States) R Leach	6	4
(Mexico) F Maciel	2	3
3	(India) R Krishnan	6	6
7	(United States) M Anger	6	6	6
(Mexico) J Lozano	4	7	7
Q	(Socialist Federal Republic of Yugoslavia) M Ostoja	4	5
(United States) M Davis	6	7
(Sweden) P Lundgren	7	6
(United States) L Shiras	6	3
(South Africa) B Moir	5	6	3
2/WC	(Soviet Union) A Chesnokov	7	2	6

Second round
6	(United States) D Goldie	5	6	5
(Spain) J Sánchez	7	3	7
(United States) M Kures	3	6	3
3	(India) R Krishnan	6	3	6
(Mexico) J Lozano	2	4
(United States) M Davis	6	6
(Sweden) P Lundgren	6	7
2/WC	(Soviet Union) A Chesnokov	3	6

Quarterfinals
(Spain) J Sánchez	0	1
3	(India) R Krishnan	6	6
(United States) M Davis	2	3
(Sweden) P Lundgren	6	6

Semifinals
3	(India) R Krishnan	2	5
(Sweden) P Lundgren	6	7
