= 1988 Rye Brook Open – Doubles =

Doubles
- 1988 Rye Brook Open

Final
- Champions: (United Kingdom) Andrew Castle (United States) Tim Wilkison
- Runners-up: (United Kingdom) Jeremy Bates (Denmark) Michael Mortensen
- Score: 4–6, 7–5, 7–6

Details
- Draw: 16
- Seeds: 4

Events
Singles	Doubles
- Rye Brook Open

Lloyd Bourne and Jeff Klaparda were the defending champions, but did not participate this year.

Andrew Castle and Tim Wilkison won the title, defeating Jeremy Bates and Michael Mortensen 4–6, 7–5, 7–6 in the final.

== Seeds ==
1. (United Kingdom) Jeremy Bates / (Denmark) Michael Mortensen (final)
2. (West Germany) Eric Jelen / (West Germany) Patrik Kühnen (quarterfinals)
3. (United Kingdom) Andrew Castle / (United States) Tim Wilkison (champions)
4. (United States) Matt Anger / (Netherlands) Michiel Schapers (semifinals)

== Draw ==
Key

- Q = Qualifier
- WC = Wild card
- LL = Lucky loser
- Alt = Alternate
- ITF = ITF entry
- PR = Protected ranking
- SR = Special ranking
- SE = Special exempt
- JE = Junior exempt
- JR = Junior Accelerator Programme entrant
- CO = College Accelerator Programme entrant
- NG = Next Gen Accelerator Program entrant
- w/o = Walkover
- r = Retired
- d = Defaulted

=== Draw ===
First round
1	(United Kingdom) J Bates (Denmark) M Mortensen	4	6	6
(Soviet Union) A Olhovskiy (Belgium) L Pimek	6	2	3
WC	(United States) J Palmer (United States) P Sampras	6	6	7
(Brazil) R Acioly (United Kingdom) D Felgate	4	7	6
4	(United States) M Anger (Netherlands) M Schapers	6	6
(United States) J Barham (Sweden) R Bergh	4	3
(New Zealand) D Lewis (Australia) S Youl	4	7	6
(Argentina) H de la Peña (Argentina) J Frana	6	5	7
(Italy) O Camporese (Italy) D Nargiso	6	7	7
(India) R Krishnan (United States) J Ross	7	5	5
(Israel) G Bloom (United States) J Levine	1	4
3	(United Kingdom) A Castle (United States) T Wilkison	6	6
(New Zealand) S Guy (United States) B Man-Son-Hing	3	4
(Australia) J Stoltenberg (Australia) T Woodbridge	6	6
(Spain) T Carbonell (Spain) J Sánchez	4	4
2	(West Germany) E Jelen (West Germany) P Kühnen	6	6

Quarterfinals
1	(United Kingdom) J Bates (Denmark) M Mortensen	6	6
WC	(United States) J Palmer (United States) P Sampras	3	2
4	(United States) M Anger (Netherlands) M Schapers	6	6
(Argentina) H de la Peña (Argentina) J Frana	4	4
(Italy) O Camporese (Italy) D Nargiso	6	6	3
3	(United Kingdom) A Castle (United States) T Wilkison	7	1	6
(Australia) J Stoltenberg (Australia) T Woodbridge	6	5	6
2	(West Germany) E Jelen (West Germany) P Kühnen	1	7	4

Semifinals
1	(United Kingdom) J Bates (Denmark) M Mortensen	7	7
4	(United States) M Anger (Netherlands) M Schapers	6	6
3	(United Kingdom) A Castle (United States) T Wilkison	6	6
(Australia) J Stoltenberg (Australia) T Woodbridge	3	3

Final
1	(United Kingdom) J Bates (Denmark) M Mortensen	6	5	6
3	(United Kingdom) A Castle (United States) T Wilkison	4	7	7
