= 1987 Rye Brook Open – Doubles =

Doubles
- 1987 Rye Brook Open

Final
- Champions: (United States) Lloyd Bourne (United States) Jeff Klaparda
- Runners-up: (Australia) Carl Limberger (Australia) Mark Woodforde
- Score: 6–3, 6–3

Details
- Draw: 16
- Seeds: 4

Events
Singles	Doubles
- Rye Brook Open

This was the first edition of the event.

Lloyd Bourne and Jeff Klaparda won the title, defeating Carl Limberger and Mark Woodforde 6–3, 6–3 in the final.

== Seeds ==
1. (United States) Rick Leach / (United States) Tim Pawsat (semifinals)
2. (United States) Andy Kohlberg / (Denmark) Michael Mortensen (quarterfinals)
3. (Australia) Carl Limberger / (Australia) Mark Woodforde (final)
4. (United States) Lloyd Bourne / (United States) Jeff Klaparda (champions)

== Draw ==
Key

- Q = Qualifier
- WC = Wild card
- LL = Lucky loser
- Alt = Alternate
- ITF = ITF entry
- PR = Protected ranking
- SR = Special ranking
- SE = Special exempt
- JE = Junior exempt
- JR = Junior Accelerator Programme entrant
- CO = College Accelerator Programme entrant
- NG = Next Gen Accelerator Program entrant
- w/o = Walkover
- r = Retired
- d = Defaulted

=== Draw ===
First round
1	(United States) R Leach (United States) T Pawsat	6	7
(United States) J Grabb (United States) J Pugh	4	6
(Mexico) J Lozano (United States) T Witsken	5	3
(South Africa) C Campbell (United Kingdom) A Castle	7	6
3	(Australia) C Limberger (Australia) M Woodforde	6	6
(Brazil) R Acioly (Brazil) N Aerts	1	3
(France) T Benhabiles (France) É Winogradsky	7	2	2
(United States) G Layendecker (Canada) G Michibata	6	6	6
(Australia) A Emerson (India) R Krishnan	6	6
(Austria) A Antonitsch (Poland) W Fibak	2	3
(Israel) G Bloom (United States) M Flur	3	1
4	(United States) L Bourne (United States) J Klaparda	6	6
(United States) J Letts (Sweden) P Lundgren	6	4	3
(United States) D Goldie (Mexico) L Lavalle	3	6	6
(United States) M Anger (United States) H Pfister	3	4
2	(United States) A Kohlberg (Denmark) M Mortensen	6	6

Quarterfinals
1	(United States) R Leach (United States) T Pawsat	4	7	7
(South Africa) C Campbell (United Kingdom) A Castle	6	6	6
3	(Australia) C Limberger (Australia) M Woodforde	4	7	7
(United States) G Layendecker (Canada) G Michibata	6	6	6
(Australia) A Emerson (India) R Krishnan	3	4
4	(United States) L Bourne (United States) J Klaparda	6	6
(United States) D Goldie (Mexico) L Lavalle	6	6	6
2	(United States) A Kohlberg (Denmark) M Mortensen	2	7	3

Semifinals
1	(United States) R Leach (United States) T Pawsat	6	6	6
3	(Australia) C Limberger (Australia) M Woodforde	7	4	7
4	(United States) L Bourne (United States) J Klaparda	6	6
(United States) D Goldie (Mexico) L Lavalle	4	1

Final
3	(Australia) C Limberger (Australia) M Woodforde	3	3
4	(United States) L Bourne (United States) J Klaparda	6	6
