= 1984 US Open – Mixed doubles =

Mixed doubles
- 1984 US Open

Final
- Champions: (Bulgaria) Manuela Maleeva (United States) Tom Gullikson
- Runners-up: (Australia) Elizabeth Sayers (Australia) John Fitzgerald
- Score: 2–6, 7–5, 6–4

Details
- Draw: 48
- Seeds: 16

Events
Singles	men	women		boys	girls
Doubles	men	women	mixed	boys	girls
WC Singles	men	women	quad
WC Doubles	men	women	quad
Legends	men	women	mixed
- US Open

Elizabeth Sayers and John Fitzgerald were the defending champions but lost in the final 2–6, 7–5, 6–4 against Manuela Maleeva and Tom Gullikson.

== Seeds ==
1. (Australia) Wendy Turnbull / (United Kingdom) John Lloyd (third round)
2. (Australia) Elizabeth Sayers / (Australia) John Fitzgerald (final)
3. (United States) Kathy Jordan / (United States) Steve Denton (quarterfinals)
4. (United States) Barbara Potter / (United States) Ferdi Taygan (semifinals)
5. (United States) Sharon Walsh / (United States) Tony Giammalva (first round)
6. (United States) Bonnie Gadusek / (Australia) Kim Warwick (first round)
7. (Hungary) Andrea Temesvári / (Switzerland) Heinz Günthardt (third round)
8. (United States) Candy Reynolds / (Australia) Michael Fancutt (quarterfinals)
9. (United States) Betsy Nagelsen / (United States) Butch Walts (third round)
10. (United States) Elise Burgin / (United States) Scott Davis (quarterfinals)
11. (United States) Paula Smith / (United States) Mel Purcell (quarterfinals)
12. (United States) Mary Lou Piatek / (United States) Robert Seguso (third round)
13. (Bulgaria) Manuela Maleeva / (United States) Tom Gullikson (champions)
14. (South Africa) Rosalyn Fairbank / (United Kingdom) Colin Dowdeswell (semifinals)
15. (United States) Wendy White / (United States) Bud Cox (first round)
16. (France) Catherine Tanvier / (Australia) Brad Drewett (second round)

== Draw ==
Key

- Q = Qualifier
- WC = Wild card
- LL = Lucky loser
- Alt = Alternate
- ITF = ITF entry
- PR = Protected ranking
- SR = Special ranking
- SE = Special exempt
- JE = Junior exempt
- JR = Junior Accelerator Programme entrant
- CO = College Accelerator Programme entrant
- NG = Next Gen Accelerator Program entrant
- w/o = Walkover
- r = Retired
- d = Defaulted

=== Finals ===
Quarterfinals
10	(United States) Elise Burgin (United States) Scott Davis	5	2
13	(Bulgaria) Manuela Maleeva (United States) Tom Gullikson	7	6
4	(United States) Barbara Potter (United States) Ferdi Taygan	6	6	6
8	(United States) Candy Reynolds (Australia) Michael Fancutt	4	7	1
14	(South Africa) Rosalyn Fairbank (United Kingdom) Colin Dowdeswell	7	6
3	(United States) Kathy Jordan (United States) Steve Denton	6	3
11	(United States) Paula Smith (United States) Mel Purcell	2	2
2	(Australia) Elizabeth Sayers (Australia) John Fitzgerald	6	6

Semifinals
13	(Bulgaria) Manuela Maleeva (United States) Tom Gullikson	7	7
4	(United States) Barbara Potter (United States) Ferdi Taygan	5	6
14	(South Africa) Rosalyn Fairbank (United Kingdom) Colin Dowdeswell	6	6	6
2	(Australia) Elizabeth Sayers (Australia) John Fitzgerald	3	7	7

Final
13	(Bulgaria) Manuela Maleeva (United States) Tom Gullikson	2	7	6
2	(Australia) Elizabeth Sayers (Australia) John Fitzgerald	6	5	4

=== Top half ===
==== Section 1 ====
First round
(Switzerland) H Strachoňová (Australia) B Dyke	w/o
(United States) S Mascarin (United States) Ti Gullickson
(United States) M Brown (United States) T Gorman	3	2
10	(United States) E Burgin (United States) S Davis	6	6
13	(Bulgaria) M Maleeva (United States) To Gullickson	6	6
(United States) P Casale (Chile) J Fillol	4	4
(West Germany) B Bunge (United States) D Stockton	6	6
5	(United States) S Walsh (United States) T Giammalva	3	4

Second round
1	(Australia) W Turnbull (United Kingdom) J Lloyd	w/o
(Switzerland) H Strachoňová (Australia) B Dyke
(United States) A Holton (United States) A Andrews	3	7	4
10	(United States) E Burgin (United States) S Davis	6	5	6
13	(Bulgaria) M Maleeva (United States) To Gullickson	6	6
(Puerto Rico) G Fernández (Puerto Rico) E Fernandez	3	3
(Romania) L Romanov (Paraguay) F González
(West Germany) B Bunge (United States) D Stockton	w/o

Third round
1	(Australia) W Turnbull (United Kingdom) J Lloyd	4	4
10	(United States) E Burgin (United States) S Davis	6	6
13	(Bulgaria) M Maleeva (United States) To Gullickson	2	6	6
(West Germany) B Bunge (United States) D Stockton	6	4	2

Quarterfinals
10	(United States) E Burgin (United States) S Davis	5	2
13	(Bulgaria) M Maleeva (United States) To Gullickson	7	6

==== Section 2 ====
First round
4	(United States) B Potter (United States) F Taygan	6	6	6
(Argentina) G Sabatini (Romania) I Năstase	3	7	4
(United States) S Foltz (Australia) M Kratzmann	1	7	3
(United States) A Moulton (United States) L Bourne	6	5	6
15	(United States) W White (United States) B Cox	4	1
(United States) B J King (United States) F Buehning	6	6
(West Germany) S Graf (United States) C Pasarell	4	5
(Italy) R Reggi (Chile) B Prajoux	6	7

Second round
4	(United States) B Potter (United States) F Taygan	7	6
(United States) H Crowe (United States) B Willenborg	6	1
(United States) A Moulton (United States) L Bourne	5	4
12	(United States) M L Piatek (United States) R Seguso	7	6
(United States) B J King (United States) F Buehning	6	6
(United States) F Raschiatore (United States) K Flach	2	3
(Italy) R Reggi (Chile) B Prajoux	5	2
8	(United States) C Reynolds (Australia) M Fancutt	7	6

Third round
4	(United States) B Potter (United States) F Taygan	6	6
12	(United States) M L Piatek (United States) R Seguso	1	2
(United States) B J King (United States) F Buehning	6	4
8	(United States) C Reynolds (Australia) M Fancutt	7	6

Quarterfinals
4	(United States) B Potter (United States) F Taygan	6	6	6
8	(United States) C Reynolds (Australia) M Fancutt	4	7	1

=== Bottom half ===
==== Section 3 ====
First round
(South Africa) I Kloss (United States) M Estep	6	6
(Brazil) P Medrado (Brazil) G Barbosa	4	2
(United Kingdom) A Croft (Australia) O Davidson	3	6
(United Kingdom) A Hobbs (United States) M Riessen	6	7
16	(France) C Tanvier (Australia) B Drewett	6	7
(Chile) G Ohaco (Sweden) H Simonsson	2	5
(United States) B Gerken (United States) G Donnelly	w/o
(Canada) J Hetherington (Chile) R Acuña

Second round
7	(Hungary) A Temesvári (Switzerland) H Günthardt	7	6
(South Africa) I Kloss (United States) M Estep	6	4
(United Kingdom) A Hobbs (United States) M Riessen	6	5
14	(South Africa) R Fairbank (United Kingdom) C Dowdeswell	7	7
16	(France) C Tanvier (Australia) B Drewett	1	6	2
(South Africa) Y Vermaak (South Africa) B Levine	6	3	6
(United States) B Gerken (United States) G Donnelly	3	6	4
3	(United States) K Jordan (United States) S Denton	6	3	6

Third round
7	(Hungary) A Temesvári (Switzerland) H Günthardt	6	1	2
14	(South Africa) R Fairbank (United Kingdom) C Dowdeswell	3	6	6
(South Africa) Y Vermaak (South Africa) B Levine	6	1
3	(United States) K Jordan (United States) S Denton	7	6

Quarterfinals
14	(South Africa) R Fairbank (United Kingdom) C Dowdeswell	7	6
3	(United States) K Jordan (United States) S Denton	6	3

==== Section 4 ====
First round
6	(United States) B Gadusek (Australia) K Warwick	6	2	3
(Australia) P Whytcross (Australia) D Graham	4	6	6
(United States) L Spain (United States) J Klaparda	4	4
11	(United States) P Smith (United States) M Purcell	6	6
9	(United States) B Nagelsen (United States) B Walts	6	7
(United States) C Benjamin (United States) R Meyer	3	5
(United States) J Russell (United States) C Strode	0	3
2	(Australia) E Sayers (Australia) J Fitzgerald	6	6

Second round
(Australia) P Whytcross (Australia) D Graham	6	6
(United States) M Torres (United States) D Ralston	4	4
(United States) R Casals (United States) T Waltke	6	2	2
11	(United States) P Smith (United States) M Purcell	3	6	6
9	(United States) B Nagelsen (United States) B Walts	w/o
(Netherlands) B Stöve (United States) S Stewart
(Australia) A Minter (Australia) L Warder	2	2
2	(Australia) E Sayers (Australia) J Fitzgerald	6	6

Third round
(Australia) P Whytcross (Australia) D Graham	6	6	4
11	(United States) P Smith (United States) M Purcell	3	7	6
9	(United States) B Nagelsen (United States) B Walts	0	2
2	(Australia) E Sayers (Australia) J Fitzgerald	6	6

Quarterfinals
11	(United States) P Smith (United States) M Purcell	2	2
2	(Australia) E Sayers (Australia) J Fitzgerald	6	6
