= Jerome Jones (tennis) =

American tennis player

- Country (sports): United States
- Plays: Left-handed

Singles
- Highest ranking: No. 357 (June 17, 1985)

Doubles
- Career record: 1–1
- Highest ranking: No. 177 (July 8, 1985)

Grand Slam doubles results
- US Open: 2R (1984)

Jerome Jones is an American former professional tennis player.

A left-hander from Los Angeles, Jones was an All-American collegiate tennis player for Pepperdine University during the early 1980s. In 1984 he claimed the NCAA Division I doubles championship with Kelly Jones (no relation), beating Rick Leach and Tim Pawsat of USC in the final.

Jones partnered with Kelly Jones at the 1984 US Open and they won their first round match over Ilie Nastase and Adriano Panatta. He reached a best world ranking of 177 in doubles.
