= 1988 Rye Brook Open – Singles =

Singles
- 1988 Rye Brook Open

Final
- Champion: (Czechoslovakia) Milan Šrejber
- Runner-up: (India) Ramesh Krishnan
- Score: 6–2, 7–6

Details
- Draw: 32
- Seeds: 8

Events
Singles	Doubles
- Rye Brook Open

Peter Lundgren was the defending champion, but did not participate this year.

Milan Šrejber won the title, defeating Ramesh Krishnan 6–2, 7–6 in the final.

== Seeds ==
1. (Netherlands) Michiel Schapers (first round)
2. (India) Ramesh Krishnan (final)
3. (West Germany) Eric Jelen (first round)
4. (Czechoslovakia) Milan Šrejber (champion)
5. (Argentina) Horacio de la Peña (semifinals)
6. (Soviet Union) Andrei Olhovskiy (second round)
7. (Sweden) Christian Bergström (first round)
8. (Argentina) Javier Frana (second round)

== Draw ==
Key

- Q = Qualifier
- WC = Wild card
- LL = Lucky loser
- Alt = Alternate
- ITF = ITF entry
- PR = Protected ranking
- SR = Special ranking
- SE = Special exempt
- JE = Junior exempt
- JR = Junior Accelerator Programme entrant
- CO = College Accelerator Programme entrant
- NG = Next Gen Accelerator Program entrant
- w/o = Walkover
- r = Retired
- d = Defaulted

=== Finals ===
Semifinals
(Italy) Diego Nargiso	3	2
4	(Czechoslovakia) Milan Šrejber	6	6
5	(Argentina) Horacio de la Peña	7	3	4
2	(India) Ramesh Krishnan	5	6	6

Final
4	(Czechoslovakia) Milan Šrejber	6	7
2	(India) Ramesh Krishnan	2	6

=== Top half ===
First round
1	(Netherlands) M Schapers	5	6
Q	(United States) P Sampras	7	7
(United Kingdom) J Bates	1	6	7
Q	(New Zealand) S Guy	6	4	6
(Italy) D Nargiso	3
Q	(United States) C Hooper	1^{r}
(United States) L Shiras	3	6	5
8	(Argentina) J Frana	6	3	7
4	(Czechoslovakia) M Šrejber	7	6
(South Africa) G Muller	6	3
(Belgium) L Pimek	7	7
(Sweden) T Svantesson	5	6
(United States) M Davis	4	6
(United States) T Wilkison	6	7
WC	(United States) J Ross	6	4
6/WC	(Soviet Union) A Olhovskiy	7	6

Second round
Q	(United States) P Sampras	7	3	3
(United Kingdom) J Bates	6	6	6
(Italy) D Nargiso	7	4	6
8	(Argentina) J Frana	6	6	2
4	(Czechoslovakia) M Šrejber	6	6
(Belgium) L Pimek	4	1
(United States) T Wilkison	6	6
6/WC	(Soviet Union) A Olhovskiy	1	0

Quarterfinals
(United Kingdom) J Bates	3	6	3
(Italy) D Nargiso	6	2	6
4	(Czechoslovakia) M Šrejber	6	6
(United States) T Wilkison	2	2

Semifinals
(Italy) D Nargiso	3	2
4	(Czechoslovakia) M Šrejber	6	6

=== Bottom half ===
First round
5	(Argentina) H de la Peña	7	7
Q	(Japan) S Matsuoka	6	6
(Belgium) E Masso	6	7
(Spain) T Carbonell	3	5
(Israel) G Bloom	7	6	4
(Spain) J Sánchez	6	7	6
(Australia) S Youl	6	4	6
3	(West Germany) E Jelen	2	6	0
7	(Sweden) C Bergström	6	3	3
(United States) M Kures	2	6	6
(Sweden) N Kroon	4	6
(Australia) J Stoltenberg	6	7
WC	(United States) T Ho	6	3	6
(United States) M Anger	4	6	4
(United Kingdom) A Castle	3	4
2	(India) R Krishnan	6	6

Second round
5	(Argentina) H de la Peña	6	5	6
(Belgium) E Masso	1	7	2
(Spain) J Sánchez	3	3
(Australia) S Youl	6	6
(United States) M Kures	4	6
(Australia) J Stoltenberg	6	7
WC	(United States) T Ho	2	1
2	(India) R Krishnan	6	6

Quarterfinals
5	(Argentina) H de la Peña	6	5	6
(Australia) S Youl	3	7	1
(Australia) J Stoltenberg	1	6
2	(India) R Krishnan	6	7

Semifinals
5	(Argentina) H de la Peña	7	3	4
2	(India) R Krishnan	5	6	6
