= Kevin Moir =

South African tennis player

- Country (sports): South Africa
- Born: 14 October 1961 (age 63); Johannesburg, South Africa
- Height: 1.88 m (6 ft 2 in)
- Turned pro: 1983
- Plays: Right-handed
- College: Auburn University
- Prize money: $44,047

Singles
- Career record: 2–10
- Career titles: 0
- Highest ranking: No. 162 (26 Aug 1985)

Grand Slam singles results
- Wimbledon: 1R (1986)
- US Open: 3R (1984)

Doubles
- Career record: 2-4
- Career titles: 0
- Highest ranking: No. 307 (21 Oct 1985)

Kevin Moir (born 14 October 1961) is a former professional tennis player from South Africa. He is the brother of Barry Moir.

== Career ==
Moir, the South African junior champion in 1980, played collegiate tennis while at Auburn University and was a member of the team that won the Southeastern Conference in 1983. He turned professional at the end of the year.

Playing as a qualifier, Moir managed to reach the third round of the US Open in 1984. He defeated top 100 player Sammy Giammalva, Jr in the opening round and then won in a walkover against countryman Kevin Curren, who withdrew with a sprained ankle before the match. In the third round, Moir met top seed and eventual champion John McEnroe. The American won in straight sets.

He also competed in the main draw of the 1986 Wimbledon Championships but was unable to get past Jay Lapidus in the first round.
