= 1988 Rye Brook Open =

- Date: August 22–28
- Edition: 2nd
- Category: Grand Prix
- Draw: 32S / 16D
- Prize money: $93,400
- Surface: Hard / outdoor
- Location: Rye Brook, New York, U.S.

Champions

Singles
- (Czechoslovakia) Milan Šrejber

Doubles
- (United Kingdom) Andrew Castle / (United States) Tim Wilkison
- Rye Brook Open

The 1988 Rye Brook Open was a men's tennis tournament played on outdoor hard courts that was part of the 1988 Nabisco Grand Prix. It was played at Rye Brook, New York in the United States from August 22 through August 28, 1988. Fourth-seeded Milan Šrejber won the singles title.

== Finals ==
=== Singles ===
(Czechoslovakia) Milan Šrejber defeated (India) Ramesh Krishnan 6–2, 7–6

- It was Šrejber's only singles title of his career.

=== Doubles ===
(United Kingdom) Andrew Castle / (United States) Tim Wilkison defeated (United Kingdom) Jeremy Bates / (Denmark) Michael Mortensen 4–6, 7–5, 7–6

- It was Castle's 2nd title of the year and the 2nd of his career. It was Wilkison's 1st title of the year and the 13th of his career.
