= 1984 US Open – Men's doubles =

Men's doubles
- 1984 US Open

Final
- Champions: (Australia) John Fitzgerald (Czechoslovakia) Tomáš Šmíd
- Runners-up: (Sweden) Stefan Edberg (Sweden) Anders Järryd
- Score: 7–6^{(7–5)}, 6–3, 6–3

Details
- Draw: 64
- Seeds: 16

Events
Singles	men	women		boys	girls
Doubles	men	women	mixed	boys	girls
WC Singles	men	women	quad
WC Doubles	men	women	quad
Legends	men	women	mixed
← 1983 ·	US Open	· 1985 →

Peter Fleming and John McEnroe were the defending champions, but lost in the semifinals to Swedes Stefan Edberg and Anders Järryd.

John Fitzgerald and Tomáš Šmíd won the title defeating Edberg and Järryd in the final.

== Seeds ==
1. (United States) Peter Fleming / (United States) John McEnroe (semifinals)
2. (Australia) Mark Edmondson / (United States) Sherwood Stewart (quarterfinals)
3. (Australia) Pat Cash / (Australia) Paul McNamee (first round)
4. (South Africa) Kevin Curren / (United States) Steve Denton (first round)
5. (United States) Fritz Buehning / (United States) Ferdi Taygan (first round)
6. (Switzerland) Heinz Günthardt / (Hungary) Balázs Taróczy (semifinals)
7. (Australia) John Fitzgerald / (Czechoslovakia) Tomáš Šmíd (champions)
8. (Sweden) Stefan Edberg / (Sweden) Anders Järryd (final)
9. (United States) Ken Flach / (United States) Robert Seguso (second round)
10. (United States) Tim Gullikson / (United States) Tom Gullikson (third round)
11. (Poland) Wojtek Fibak / (United States) Sandy Mayer (third round)
12. (United States) Gary Donnelly / (United States) Butch Walts (third round)
13. n.a.
14. (Australia) Broderick Dyke / (Australia) Wally Masur (second round)
15. (Australia) Brad Drewett / (Australia) Kim Warwick (second round)
16. (United States) Tony Giammalva / (United States) Steve Meister (second round)

== Draw ==
=== Key ===
- Q = Qualifier
- WC = Wild card
- LL = Lucky loser
- Alt = Alternate
- ITF = ITF entry
- PR = Protected ranking
- SR = Special ranking
- SE = Special exempt
- JE = Junior exempt
- JR = Junior Accelerator Programme entrant
- CO = College Accelerator Programme entrant
- NG = Next Gen Accelerator Program entrant
- w/o = Walkover
- r = Retired
- d = Defaulted

=== Finals ===
Quarterfinals
1	(United States) Peter Fleming (United States) John McEnroe	6	6	6
(United Kingdom) John Lloyd (United States) Dick Stockton	1	1	3
(United States) Mike Bauer (Brazil) Cássio Motta	7	3	3	4
8	(Sweden) Stefan Edberg (Sweden) Anders Järryd	5	6	6	6
7	(Australia) John Fitzgerald (Czechoslovakia) Tomáš Šmíd	6	6	7
(United States) Scott Davis (United States) Ben Testerman	1	2	6
6	(Switzerland) Heinz Günthardt (Hungary) Balázs Taróczy	7	4	6	7
2	(Australia) Mark Edmondson (United States) Sherwood Stewart	6	6	3	6

Semifinals
1	(United States) Peter Fleming (United States) John McEnroe	6	6	5	6
8	(Sweden) Stefan Edberg (Sweden) Anders Järryd	3	7	7	7
7	(Australia) John Fitzgerald (Czechoslovakia) Tomáš Šmíd	7	3	6	6
6	(Switzerland) Heinz Günthardt (Hungary) Balázs Taróczy	6	6	1	4

Final
8	(Sweden) Stefan Edberg (Sweden) Anders Järryd	6^{5}	3	3
7	(Australia) John Fitzgerald (Czechoslovakia) Tomáš Šmíd	7^{7}	6	6

=== Top half ===
==== Section 1 ====
First round
1	(United States) P Fleming (United States) J McEnroe	6	6
(Chile) B Prajoux (United States) N Saviano	2	4
(United States) L Stefanki (United States) R Van't Hof	7	1	7
(United States) M De Palmer (United States) S Giammalva Jr.	5	6	5
(United States) A Kohlberg (United States) R Meyer	6	7
(New Zealand) C Lewis (New Zealand) R Simpson	4	6
(United States) L Bourne (United States) M Dickson	2	3
11	(Poland) W Fibak (United States) S Mayer	6	6
15	(Australia) B Drewett (Australia) K Warwick	0	7	6
(United States) L Shiras (United States) C Strode	6	6	2
(Brazil) G Barbosa (Chile) J Fillol	6	6
(Italy) S Colombo (Italy) G Ocleppo	2	3
(United States) P Annacone (United States) J Arias	6	2	6
(United States) B Cox (United States) T Moor	4	6	3
(United Kingdom) J Lloyd (United States) D Stockton	6	7
5	(United States) F Buehning (United States) F Taygan	4	6

Second round
1	(United States) P Fleming (United States) J McEnroe	6	6
(United States) L Stefanki (United States) R Van't Hof	3	3
(United States) A Kohlberg (United States) R Meyer	1	4
11	(Poland) W Fibak (United States) S Mayer	6	6
15	(Australia) B Drewett (Australia) K Warwick	5	7	6
(Brazil) G Barbosa (Chile) J Fillol	7	6	7
(United States) P Annacone (United States) J Arias	6	2
(United Kingdom) J Lloyd (United States) D Stockton	7	6

Third round
1	(United States) P Fleming (United States) J McEnroe	6	7
11	(Poland) W Fibak (United States) S Mayer	1	6
(Brazil) G Barbosa (Chile) J Fillol	6	5	6
(United Kingdom) J Lloyd (United States) D Stockton	3	7	7

Quarterfinals
1	(United States) P Fleming (United States) J McEnroe	6	6	6
(United Kingdom) J Lloyd (United States) D Stockton	1	1	3

==== Section 2 ====
First round
3	(Australia) P Cash (Australia) P McNamee	4	6	3
(Paraguay) F González (United States) M Mitchell	6	4	6
(United States) M Bauer (Brazil) C Motta	7	6
(United Kingdom) C Dowdeswell (Australia) C Miller	6	4
(United States) A Andrews (United States) J Sadri	7	6
(United States) D Cassidy (United States) J Klaparda	6	2
(France) G Forget (France) H Leconte	7	4	3
14	(Australia) B Dyke (Australia) W Masur	6	6	6
10	(United States) Ti Gullikson (United States) To Gullikson	6	7
(United States) L Jensen (United States) P McEnroe	4	6
(Australia) D Graham (Australia) L Warder	6	7
(United States) J Turpin (United States) E Van't Hof	3	5
(United States) E Fromm (United States) E Teltscher	6	6	6
(United States) M Davis (United States) C Dunk	7	4	3
(Ecuador) A Gómez (United States) M Purcell	4	4
8	(Sweden) S Edberg (Sweden) A Järryd	6	6

Second round
(Paraguay) F González (United States) M Mitchell	2	4
(United States) M Bauer (Brazil) C Motta	6	6
(United States) A Andrews (United States) J Sadri	7	6
14	(Australia) B Dyke (Australia) W Masur	6	2
10	(United States) Ti Gullikson (United States) To Gullikson	7	7
(Australia) D Graham (Australia) L Warder	5	6
(United States) E Fromm (United States) E Teltscher	3	6
8	(Sweden) S Edberg (Sweden) A Järryd	6	7

Third round
(United States) M Bauer (Brazil) C Motta	6	6
(United States) A Andrews (United States) J Sadri	2	4
10	(United States) Ti Gullikson (United States) To Gullikson	3	2
8	(Sweden) S Edberg (Sweden) A Järryd	6	6

Quarterfinals
(United States) M Bauer (Brazil) C Motta	7	3	3	4
8	(Sweden) S Edberg (Sweden) A Järryd	6	6	6	6

=== Bottom half ===
==== Section 3 ====
First round
7	(Australia) J Fitzgerald (Czechoslovakia) T Šmíd	6	6
(Finland) L Palin (Sweden) S Simonsson	1	3
(Australia) P Doohan (Australia) M Fancutt	6	6
(New Zealand) M Lewis (New Zealand) D Mustard	3	2
(United States) T Delatte (United States) C Wittus	7	7
(Puerto Rico) E Fernández (United States) D Pate	5	6
(Chile) R Acuña (Chile) Á Fillol	6	6	1
9	(United States) K Flach (United States) R Seguso	4	7	6
16	(United States) T Giammalva (United States) S Meister	6	6
(United States) M Freeman (United States) T Wilkison	4	2
(United States) S Davis (United States) B Testerman	6	6
(United States) B Lutz (United States) S Smith	2	4
(United States) S Brawley (United States) H Sands	3	7	6
(Denmark) M Mortensen (Sweden) H Simonsson	6	6	3
(United States) D Gitlin (United States) P Rennert	6	6	6
4	(South Africa) K Curren (United States) S Denton	3	7	2

Second round
7	(Australia) J Fitzgerald (Czechoslovakia) T Šmíd	6	6
(Australia) P Doohan (Australia) M Fancutt	3	3
(United States) T Delatte (United States) C Wittus	6	4	6
9	(United States) K Flach (United States) R Seguso	2	6	3
16	(United States) T Giammalva (United States) S Meister	6	6
(United States) S Davis (United States) B Testerman	7	7
(United States) S Brawley (United States) H Sands	2	6	3
(United States) D Gitlin (United States) P Rennert	6	3	6

Third round
7	(Australia) J Fitzgerald (Czechoslovakia) T Šmíd	2	6	6
(United States) T Delatte (United States) C Wittus	6	3	4
(United States) S Davis (United States) B Testerman	6	6
(United States) D Gitlin (United States) P Rennert	4	4

Quarterfinals
7	(Australia) J Fitzgerald (Czechoslovakia) T Šmíd	6	6	7
(United States) S Davis (United States) B Testerman	1	2	6

==== Section 4 ====
First round
6	(Switzerland) H Günthardt (Hungary) B Taróczy	6	6
(Sweden) J Nyström (Sweden) M Wilander	3	3
(United States) J Grabb (South Africa) C van Rensburg	2	7	6
(United States) D Saltz (South Africa) D Tarr	6	6	4
(United States) R Harmon (United States) V Winitsky	6	6
(India) A Amritraj (Socialist Federal Republic of Yugoslavia) M Ostoja	3	4
(United States) B Gottfried (United States) B Manson	7	4	7
(United States) M Flur (United States) S McCain	6	6	5
12	(United States) G Donnelly (United States) B Walts	6	3	6
(South Africa) E Edwards (South Africa) D Visser	3	6	4
(United States) J Jones (United States) K Jones	4	7	7
(Romania) I Năstase (Italy) A Panatta	6	6	6
(Israel) S Glickstein (Israel) S Perkiss	6	6
(United States) J Mattke (United States) E Sherbeck	3	3
(Australia) M Kratzmann (United States) B Levine	4	4
2	(Australia) M Edmondson (United States) S Stewart	6	6

Second round
6	(Switzerland) H Günthardt (Hungary) B Taróczy	6	7
(United States) J Grabb (South Africa) C van Rensburg	3	6
(United States) R Harmon (United States) V Winitsky	4	6
(United States) B Gottfried (United States) B Manson	6	7
12	(United States) G Donnelly (United States) B Walts	6	6
(United States) J Jones (United States) K Jones	3	1
(Israel) S Glickstein (Israel) S Perkiss	6	2
2	(Australia) M Edmondson (United States) S Stewart	7	6

Third round
6	(Switzerland) H Günthardt (Hungary) B Taróczy	7	6
(United States) B Gottfried (United States) B Manson	5	3
12	(United States) G Donnelly (United States) B Walts	1	5
2	(Australia) M Edmondson (United States) S Stewart	6	7

Quarterfinals
6	(Switzerland) H Günthardt (Hungary) B Taróczy	7	4	6	7
2	(Australia) M Edmondson (United States) S Stewart	6	6	3	6
