= 1984 US Open – Men's singles =

Men's singles
- 1984 US Open

Final
- Champion: (United States) John McEnroe
- Runner-up: (Czechoslovakia) Ivan Lendl
- Score: 6–3, 6–4, 6–1

Details
- Draw: 128
- Seeds: 16

Events
Singles	men	women		boys	girls
Doubles	men	women	mixed	boys	girls
WC Singles	men	women	quad
WC Doubles	men	women	quad
Legends	men	women	mixed
- US Open

John McEnroe defeated Ivan Lendl in the final, 6–3, 6–4, 6–1 to win the men's singles tennis title at the 1984 US Open. It was his fourth US Open singles title and seventh and last major singles title overall. It was Lendl's third consecutive runner-up finish at the US Open.

Jimmy Connors was the two-time defending champion, but was defeated by McEnroe in the semifinals, in the last match between the pair at a major singles tournament.

== Seeds ==
1. (United States) John McEnroe (champion)
2. (Czechoslovakia) Ivan Lendl (final)
3. (United States) Jimmy Connors (semifinals)
4. (Sweden) Mats Wilander (quarterfinals)
5. (Ecuador) Andrés Gómez (quarterfinals)
6. (United States) Jimmy Arias (second round)
7. (United States) Johan Kriek (third round)
8. (United States) Aaron Krickstein (third round)
9. (Sweden) Henrik Sundström (fourth round)
10. (United States) Eliot Teltscher (third round)
11. (Spain) Juan Aguilera (second round)
12. (United States) Vitas Gerulaitis (fourth round)
13. (Czechoslovakia) Tomáš Šmíd (fourth round)
14. (Sweden) Anders Järryd (fourth round)
15. (Australia) Pat Cash (semifinals)
16. (Sweden) Joakim Nyström (fourth round)

== Draw ==
Key

- Q = Qualifier
- WC = Wild card
- LL = Lucky loser
- Alt = Alternate
- ITF = ITF entry
- PR = Protected ranking
- SR = Special ranking
- SE = Special exempt
- JE = Junior exempt
- JR = Junior Accelerator Programme entrant
- CO = College Accelerator Programme entrant
- NG = Next Gen Accelerator Program entrant
- w/o = Walkover
- r = Retired
- d = Defaulted

=== Finals ===
Quarterfinals
1	(United States) John McEnroe	7	6	6
(United States) Gene Mayer	5	3	4
3	(United States) Jimmy Connors	7	6	6
(United Kingdom) John Lloyd	5	2	0
15	(Australia) Pat Cash	7^{7}	6	2	6
4	(Sweden) Mats Wilander	6^{3}	4	6	3
5	(Ecuador) Andrés Gómez	4	4	1
2	(Czechoslovakia) Ivan Lendl	6	6	6

Semifinals
1	(United States) John McEnroe	6	4	7	4	6
3	(United States) Jimmy Connors	4	6	5	6	3
15	(Australia) Pat Cash	6	3	4	7^{7}	6^{4}
2	(Czechoslovakia) Ivan Lendl	3	6	6	6^{5}	7^{7}

Final
1	(United States) John McEnroe	6	6	6
2	(Czechoslovakia) Ivan Lendl	3	4	1

=== Top half ===
==== Section 1 ====
First round
1	(United States) J McEnroe	6	6	6
(United Kingdom) C Dowdeswell	1	1	1
(Sweden) S Edberg	6	6	6
(United States) L Stefanki	4	3	0
(South Africa) K Curren	7	3	6	6
(United States) M Purcell	6	6	3	2
Q	(South Africa) K Moir	6	6	6
(United States) S Giammalva, Jr.	4	3	3
(United States) M Doyle	6	6	6
(United States) R Tanner	2	2	4
(Australia) W Masur	3	4	6	6	6
(Australia) J Fitzgerald	6	6	1	3	7
(United States) T Wilkison	3	6	6	6
Q	(United States) B Green	6	2	7	7
Q	(West Germany) H Schwaier	6	3	3	6	4
11	(Spain) J Aguilera	4	6	6	4	6

Second round
1	(United States) J McEnroe	6	6	6
(Sweden) S Edberg	1	0	2
(South Africa) K Curren
Q	(South Africa) K Moir	w/o
(United States) M Doyle	7	7	3	3	5
(Australia) J Fitzgerald	6	5	6	6	7
Q	(United States) B Green	6	7	6
11	(Spain) J Aguilera	4	6	3

Third round
1	(United States) J McEnroe	6	6	6
Q	(South Africa) K Moir	3	0	3
(Australia) J Fitzgerald	6	4	3	6
Q	(United States) B Green	4	6	6	7

Fourth round
1	(United States) J McEnroe	6	6	6
Q	(United States) B Green	3	2	2

==== Section 2 ====
First round
13	(Czechoslovakia) T Šmid	1	6	6	7
(United States) R Seguso	6	1	4	5
(New Zealand) R Simpson	1	7	4	5
(Australia) P McNamee	6	5	6	7
(Switzerland) C Mezzadri	6	6	4	2
(Paraguay) F González	4	7	6	6
(United States) T Gullikson	6	6	6
(Peru) P Arraya	1	4	3
WC	(United States) M Leach	1	2	3
(Argentina) G Vilas	6	6	6
WC	(Sweden) M Pernfors	3	4	4
(Italy) S Colombo	6	6	6
(United States) G Mayer	7	6	6
(Socialist Federal Republic of Yugoslavia) M Ostoja	5	3	1
(United States) T Moor	6	4	6	6
6	(United States) J Arias	4	6	7	7

Second round
13	(Czechoslovakia) T Šmid	7	6	6
(Australia) P McNamee	5	3	3
(Paraguay) F González	4	2	5
(United States) T Gullikson	6	6	7
(Argentina) G Vilas	6	6	7
(Italy) S Colombo	3	1	5
(United States) G Mayer	6	6	6
6	(United States) J Arias	4	2	3

Third round
13	(Czechoslovakia) T Šmid	4	6	7	6
(United States) T Gullikson	6	4	6	4
(Argentina) G Vilas	3	1	4
(United States) G Mayer	6	6	6

Fourth round
13	(Czechoslovakia) T Šmid	3	2	3
(United States) G Mayer	6	6	6

==== Section 3 ====
First round
3	(United States) J Connors	6	6	6
(United States) M Mitchell	3	0	2
(United States) B Gottfried	7	6	6
(United States) B Testerman	5	2	3
(France) H Leconte	2	6	6	6
(United States) J Sadri	6	3	4	3
(United States) L Bourne	3	2	4
Q	(Australia) P Doohan	6	6	6
Q	(United States) K Belcher	6	6	6	4	6
(United States) L Shiras	4	7	4	6	3
(United States) S Mayer	7	6	6	7
(Brazil) C Motta	5	7	2	6
(United States) P Annacone	6	4	4	4
(India) R Krishnan	3	6	6	6
(Chile) R Acuña	2	2	0
16	(Sweden) J Nyström	6	6	6

Second round
3	(United States) J Connors	6	6	6
(United States) B Gottfried	3	3	2
(France) H Leconte	7	6	7
Q	(Australia) P Doohan	5	4	5
Q	(United States) K Belcher	3	6	3
(United States) S Mayer	6	7	6
(India) R Krishnan	5	3	6
16	(Sweden) J Nyström	7	6	7

Third round
3	(United States) J Connors	6	6	7^{7}
(France) H Leconte	4	1	6^{2}
(United States) S Mayer	7	7	3	3	0
16	(Sweden) J Nyström	5	5	6	6	6

Fourth round
3	(United States) J Connors	7	6	6
16	(Sweden) J Nyström	6	0	3

==== Section 4 ====
First round
9	(Sweden) H Sundström	7	2	6	6
(Poland) W Fibak	5	6	0	3
(Australia) M Edmondson	4	6	7	2	3
(United States) R Brown	6	4	6	6	6
(Switzerland) J Hlasek	7	3	2	3
(Israel) S Perkiss	6	6	6	6
WC	(United States) L Duncan	4	1	3
(United States) T Giammalva	6	6	6
WC	(United States) P Dupre	2	6	4	6	1
(Czechoslovakia) L Pimek	6	1	6	4	6
(United Kingdom) J Lloyd	6	6	7
(United States) P Fleming	3	4	6
WC	(United States) D Goldie	3	6	1	6
(Hungary) B Taróczy	6	3	6	7
Q	(United States) G Layendecker	6	2	0
7	(United States) J Kriek	7	6	6

Second round
9	(Sweden) H Sundström	6	6	6
(United States) R Brown	1	2	0
(Israel) S Perkiss	6	6	6
(United States) T Giammalva	4	2	4
(Czechoslovakia) L Pimek	2	1	2
(United Kingdom) J Lloyd	6	6	6
(Hungary) B Taróczy	6	6	2	2
7	(United States) J Kriek	4	7	6	6

Third round
9	(Sweden) H Sundström	7	6	5	6
(Israel) S Perkiss	6	4	7	4
(United Kingdom) J Lloyd	2	7	6	6
7	(United States) J Kriek	6	6	2	3

Fourth round
9	(Sweden) H Sundström	6	4	4	2
(United Kingdom) J Lloyd	4	6	6	6

=== Bottom half ===
==== Section 5 ====
First round
8	(United States) A Krickstein	3	2	7	6	4
(United States) B Manson	6	6	6	2	0^{r}
Q	(United States) J Hayes	3	6	6	6
Q	(United States) J Klaparda	6	7	3	7
(France) G Forget	6	3	4	6	6
(United States) G Holmes	2	6	6	3	7
(United States) V Van Patten	4	6	6
(Sweden) T Högstedt	6	7	7
(United States) D Saltz	6	7	4	4	2
Q	(United States) T Nelson	3	6	6	6	6
(Sweden) S Simonsson	4	6	4	7	6
(United States) R Harmon	6	3	6	6	2
Q	(United States) D Pate	4	0	2
(United States) B Gilbert	6	6	6
WC	(Romania) I Năstase	3	5	1
15	(Australia) P Cash	6	7	6

Second round
8	(United States) A Krickstein	6	6	3	7
Q	(United States) J Klaparda	4	3	6	6
(United States) G Holmes	6	6	7
(Sweden) T Högstedt	2	4	6
Q	(United States) T Nelson	6	6	7
(Sweden) S Simonsson	3	1	6
(United States) B Gilbert	3	4	2
15	(Australia) P Cash	6	6	6

Third round
8	(United States) A Krickstein	1	6	2	6
(United States) G Holmes	6	4	6	7
Q	(United States) T Nelson	3	3	2
15	(Australia) P Cash	6	6	6

Fourth round
(United States) G Holmes	6^{5}	3	1
15	(Australia) P Cash	7^{7}	6	6

==== Section 6 ====
First round
10	(United States) E Teltscher	7	6	6	6
(Switzerland) H Günthardt	6	2	7	3
(France) T Tulasne	6	6	4
(United States) M Dickson	7	7	6
Q	(Finland) L Palin	6	4	2	6	6
(United States) R Van't Hof	4	6	6	2	3
(New Zealand) C Lewis	4	3	1
(United States) T Mayotte	6	6	6
(United States) M Davis	4	6	6	6
Q	(United States) J Gurfein	6	2	4	1
(United States) B Scanlon	6	6	6
(United States) B Willenborg	3	1	3
Q	(Sweden) H Simonsson	6	4	4
WC	(United States) M Kures	7	6	6
(Canada) G Michibata	3	4	4
4	(Sweden) M Wilander	6	6	6

Second round
10	(United States) E Teltscher	3	6	2	6	7
(United States) M Dickson	6	4	6	3	6
Q	(Finland) L Palin	4	4	6	1
(United States) T Mayotte	6	6	3	6
(United States) M Davis	4	3	5
(United States) B Scanlon	6	6	7
WC	(United States) M Kures	6	3	4
4	(Sweden) M Wilander	7	6	6

Third round
10	(United States) E Teltscher	4	3	4
(United States) T Mayotte	6	6	6
(United States) B Scanlon	6	5	3
4	(Sweden) M Wilander	7	7	6

Fourth round
(United States) T Mayotte	4	4	6
4	(Sweden) M Wilander	6	6	7

==== Section 7 ====
First round
5	(Ecuador) A Gómez	6	6	6
(Israel) S Glickstein	1	4	2
(Argentina) R Argüello	6	5	5	4
(United States) M Bauer	4	7	7	6
(Uruguay) D Pérez	7	4	2	2
Q	(United States) J Lapidus	6	6	6	6
(United States) V Winitsky	1	4	6	6	7
(United States) M Freeman	6	6	1	1	6
Q	(United States) K Flach	6	6	7	3	6
(West Germany) M Westphal	3	7	5	6	3
(India) V Amritraj	7	6	6
(United States) F Buehning	5	3	4
(Italy) G Ocleppo	6	6	4	4	6
(Chile) P Rebolledo	3	2	6	6	4
(South Africa) D Tarr	3	3	3
12	(United States) V Gerulaitis	6	6	6

Second round
5	(Ecuador) A Gómez	6	4	6	6
(United States) M Bauer	0	6	3	2
Q	(United States) J Lapidus	6	6	6
(United States) V Winitsky	3	3	4
Q	(United States) K Flach	6	7	6
(India) V Amritraj	2	5	1
(Italy) G Ocleppo	1	4	0
12	(United States) V Gerulaitis	6	6	6

Third round
5	(Ecuador) A Gómez	6	7	3	6
Q	(United States) J Lapidus	3	5	6	3
Q	(United States) K Flach	4	2	6	7	1
12	(United States) V Gerulaitis	6	6	4	6	6

Fourth round
5	(Ecuador) A Gómez	6	7	6
12	(United States) V Gerulaitis	4	6	1

==== Section 8 ====
First round
14	(Sweden) A Järryd	6	7	6
(Australia) J Frawley	4	6	4
(United States) T Gullikson	7	6	5	4	2
(South Africa) D Visser	6	2	7	6	6
(United States) C Hooper	3	2	7	4
(United States) S Davis	6	6	5	6
(United States) S Meister	1	6	6	4	4
(Australia) B Drewett	6	3	4	6	6
(United States) J Brown	6	6	6
(United States) D Stockton	4	3	2
Q	(United States) J Canter	4	3	4
(United States) S Denton	6	6	6
(Brazil) G Barbosa	7	1	4	7	3
(South Africa) E Edwards	6	6	6	6	6
(United States) B Teacher	4	4	5
2	(Czechoslovakia) I Lendl	6	6	7

Second round
14	(Sweden) A Järryd	6	6	3	7	6
(South Africa) D Visser	7	3	6	5	3
(United States) S Davis	4	3	2
(Australia) B Drewett	6	6	6
(United States) J Brown	4	6	7	6
(United States) S Denton	6	4	6	3
(South Africa) E Edwards	6	6^{3}	3	1
2	(Czechoslovakia) I Lendl	3	7^{7}	6	6

Third round
14	(Sweden) A Järryd	6	6	6
(Australia) B Drewett	2	3	3
(United States) J Brown	1	2	4
2	(Czechoslovakia) I Lendl	6	6	6

Fourth round
14	(Sweden) A Järryd	2	2	4
2	(Czechoslovakia) I Lendl	6	6	6

Preceded by 1984 Wimbledon Championships – Men's singles	Grand Slam men's singles	Succeeded by 1984 Australian Open – Men's singles
