= 1984 US Open – Women's doubles =

Women's doubles
- 1984 US Open

Final
- Champions: (United States) Martina Navratilova (United States) Pam Shriver
- Runners-up: (United Kingdom) Anne Hobbs (Australia) Wendy Turnbull
- Score: 6–2, 6–4

Details
- Draw: 64
- Seeds: 16

Events
Singles	men	women		boys	girls
Doubles	men	women	mixed	boys	girls
WC Singles	men	women	quad
WC Doubles	men	women	quad
Legends	men	women	mixed
← 1983 ·	US Open	· 1985 →

Defending champions Martina Navratilova and Pam Shriver successfully defended their title, defeating Anne Hobbs and Wendy Turnbull in the final, 6–2, 6–4 to win the women's doubles tennis title at the 1984 US Open. It was the third step in an eventual Grand Slam for the pair.

== Seeds ==
1. (United States) Martina Navratilova / (United States) Pam Shriver (champions)
2. (West Germany) Claudia Kohde-Kilsch / (Czechoslovakia) Hana Mandlíková (third round)
3. (United Kingdom) Jo Durie / (United States) Ann Kiyomura-Hayashi (third round)
4. (United States) Barbara Potter / (United States) Sharon Walsh (quarterfinals)
5. (United Kingdom) Anne Hobbs / (Australia) Wendy Turnbull (final)
6. (South Africa) Rosalyn Fairbank / (United States) Candy Reynolds (semifinals)
7. (United States) Alycia Moulton / (United States) Paula Smith (quarterfinals)
8. (United States) Kathy Jordan / (Australia) Elizabeth Sayers (third round)
9. (United States) Chris Evert-Lloyd / (United States) Billie Jean King (quarterfinals)
10. (Switzerland) Christiane Jolissaint / (Netherlands) Marcella Mesker (semifinals)
11. (United States) Andrea Leand / (United States) Mary-Lou Piatek (first round)
12. (United States) Sandy Collins / (Czechoslovakia) Helena Suková (first round)
13. (United States) Rosemary Casals / (United States) Wendy White (third round)
14. (Socialist Federal Republic of Yugoslavia) Mima Jaušovec / (United Kingdom) Virginia Wade (second round)
15. (United States) Betsy Nagelsen / (United States) Anne White (semifinals)
16. (United States) Elise Burgin / (United States) JoAnne Russell (third round)

== Draw ==
=== Key ===
- Q = Qualifier
- WC = Wild card
- LL = Lucky loser
- Alt = Alternate
- SE = Special exempt
- PR = Protected ranking
- ITF = ITF entry
- JE = Junior exempt
- w/o = Walkover
- r = Retired
- d = Defaulted
- SR = Special ranking

=== Finals ===
Quarterfinals
1	(United States) Martina Navratilova (United States) Pam Shriver	6	6
6	(South Africa) Rosalyn Fairbank (United States) Candy Reynolds	3	4
15	(United States) Betsy Nagelsen (United States) Anne White	7	4	6
9	(United States) Chris Evert-Lloyd (United States) Billie Jean King	6	6	3
5	(United Kingdom) Anne Hobbs (Australia) Wendy Turnbull	6	7	6
4	(United States) Barbara Potter (United States) Sharon Walsh	7	5	4
7	(United States) Alycia Moulton (United States) Paula Smith	2	4
10	(Switzerland) Christiane Jolissaint (Netherlands) Marcella Mesker	6	6

Semifinals
1	(United States) Martina Navratilova (United States) Pam Shriver	6	7
15	(United States) Betsy Nagelsen (United States) Anne White	4	5
5	(United Kingdom) Anne Hobbs (Australia) Wendy Turnbull	6	6
10	(Switzerland) Christiane Jolissaint (Netherlands) Marcella Mesker	4	1

Final
1	(United States) Martina Navratilova (United States) Pam Shriver	6	6
5	(United Kingdom) Anne Hobbs (Australia) Wendy Turnbull	2	4

=== Top half ===
==== Section 1 ====
First round
1	(United States) M Navratilova (United States) P Shriver	6	6
(South Africa) J Mundel (United States) F Raschiatore	2	1
(United States) L Allen (United States) K Shaefer	6	5	6
(United States) P Louie (United States) H Ludloff	2	7	3
(Denmark) T Scheuer-Larsen (France) C Tanvier	6	6
(United States) H Manset (United States) M Schillig	2	1
(Japan) E Inoue (United States) V Nelson	3	4
11	(United States) A Leand (United States) M-L Piatek	6	6
13	(United States) R Casals (United States) W White	6	7
(United States) R Blount (United States) J Newberry	1	6
(United States) T Holladay (Poland) I Kuczyńska	6	5	6
(United States) L Bonder (Italy) R Reggi	3	7	3
(United States) L Antonoplis (South Africa) B Mould	6	6
(Czechoslovakia) Y Brzáková (Austria) P Huber	1	3
(Sweden) C Jexell (United States) J Klitch	5	0
6	(South Africa) R Fairbank (United States) C Reynolds	7	6

Second round
1	(United States) M Navratilova (United States) P Shriver	6	7
(United States) L Allen (United States) K Shaefer	1	6
(Denmark) T Scheuer-Larsen (France) C Tanvier	6	6
11	(United States) A Leand (United States) M-L Piatek	2	2
13	(United States) R Casals (United States) W White	6	6	6
(United States) T Holladay (Poland) I Kuczyńska	3	7	3
(United States) L Antonoplis (South Africa) B Mould	0	6
6	(South Africa) R Fairbank (United States) C Reynolds	6	7

Third round
1	(United States) M Navratilova (United States) P Shriver	6	6
(Denmark) T Scheuer-Larsen (France) C Tanvier	3	3
13	(United States) R Casals (United States) W White	4	2
6	(South Africa) R Fairbank (United States) C Reynolds	6	6

Quarterfinals
1	(United States) M Navratilova (United States) P Shriver	6	6
6	(South Africa) R Fairbank (United States) C Reynolds	3	4

==== Section 2 ====
First round
3	(United Kingdom) J Durie (United States) A Kiyomura-Hayashi	6	7
(United States) K Horvath (Romania) V Ruzici	3	6
(South Africa) I Kloss (United States) P Teeguarden	4	6
(United States) S Mascarin (United States) K Rinaldi	6	7
(United States) H Crowe (United States) K Steinmetz	1	6
(West Germany) S Graf (United States) T Phelps	6	7
(United States) A Holton (United States) K Holton	2	6
15	(United States) B Nagelsen (United States) A White	6	7
9	(United States) C Evert-Lloyd (United States) B J King	3	6	6
(Brazil) C Monteiro (South Africa) Y Vermaak	6	1	0
(United States) P Fendick (Canada) J Hetherington	3	4
(United States) P Barg (United States) B Gerken	6	6
(France) P Paradis (France) C Suire	2	6
(United States) L Gates (United States) C MacGregor	6	7
(United States) P Casale (United States) K Sands	3	3
8	(United States) K Jordan (Australia) E Sayers	6	6

Second round
3	(United Kingdom) J Durie (United States) A Kiyomura-Hayashi	6	6
(United States) S Mascarin (United States) K Rinaldi	2	3
(West Germany) S Graf (United States) T Phelps	2	6	1
15	(United States) B Nagelsen (United States) A White	6	4	6
9	(United States) C Evert-Lloyd (United States) B J King	6	6
(United States) P Barg (United States) B Gerken	2	2
(United States) L Gates (United States) C MacGregor	3	1
8	(United States) K Jordan (Australia) E Sayers	6	6

Third round
3	(United Kingdom) J Durie (United States) A Kiyomura-Hayashi	4	0
15	(United States) B Nagelsen (United States) A White	6	6
9	(United States) C Evert-Lloyd (United States) B J King	6	2	7
8	(United States) K Jordan (Australia) E Sayers	4	6	6

Quarterfinals
15	(United States) B Nagelsen (United States) A White	7	4	6
9	(United States) C Evert-Lloyd (United States) B J King	6	6	3

=== Bottom half ===
==== Section 3 ====
First round
5	(United Kingdom) A Hobbs (Australia) W Turnbull	6	6
(United States) S Foltz (United States) D Spence	3	1
(United States) G Fernández (Australia) S Leo	6	6
(United Kingdom) A Brown (United Kingdom) J Salmon	4	2
(Peru) L Arraya (West Germany) B Bunge	1	4
(Czechoslovakia) I Budařová (Czechoslovakia) M Skuherská	6	6
(Canada) C Bassett (Hungary) A Temesvári	6	2	7
12	(United States) S Collins (Czechoslovakia) H Suková	3	6	6
16	(United States) E Burgin (United States) J Russell	6	6
(United States) C Christian (United States) S Rimes	0	3
(Romania) L Romanov (Netherlands) B Stöve	1	1
(United States) A Henricksson (United States) N Yeargin	6	6
(Australia) A Minter (Australia) E Minter	6	6
(South Africa) R Uys (Peru) P Vásquez	1	4
(United States) C Benjamin (United States) Z Garrison	3	6	1
4	(United States) B Potter (United States) S Walsh	6	2	6

Second round
5	(United Kingdom) A Hobbs (Australia) W Turnbull	6	6
(United States) G Fernández (Australia) S Leo	1	4
(Czechoslovakia) I Budařová (Czechoslovakia) M Skuherská	2	1
(Canada) C Bassett (Hungary) A Temesvári	6	6
16	(United States) E Burgin (United States) J Russell	6	6
(United States) A Henricksson (United States) N Yeargin	3	4
(Australia) A Minter (Australia) E Minter	3	2
4	(United States) B Potter (United States) S Walsh	6	6

Third round
5	(United Kingdom) A Hobbs (Australia) W Turnbull	6	7	6
(Canada) C Bassett (Hungary) A Temesvári	7	5	0
16	(United States) E Burgin (United States) J Russell	1	0	r
4	(United States) B Potter (United States) S Walsh	6	1

Quarterfinals
5	(United Kingdom) A Hobbs (Australia) W Turnbull	6	7	6
4	(United States) B Potter (United States) S Walsh	7	5	4

==== Section 4 ====
First round
7	(United States) A Moulton (United States) P Smith	6	7
(United States) E Raponi-Longo (United States) M Torres	4	5
(United States) S Margolin (United States) B Norton	6	6
(Switzerland) P Jauch-Delhees (West Germany) P Keppeler	4	4
(United States) G Rush (United States) R White	6	6
(Czechoslovakia) K Skronská (France) C Vanier	3	2
(United States) L Bernstein (France) N Herreman	2	4
14	(Socialist Federal Republic of Yugoslavia) M Jaušovec (United Kingdom) V Wade	6	6
10	(Switzerland) C Jolissaint (Netherlands) M Mesker	6	4	7
(Brazil) P Medrado (Australia) B Remilton	1	6	5
(United States) C Copeland (United States) L McNeil	4	6	6
(Socialist Federal Republic of Yugoslavia) S Goleš (Bulgaria) M Maleeva	6	2	3
(United States) A M Fernandez (Australia) P Whytcross	6	1	7
(United Kingdom) S Barker (United Kingdom) A Croft	4	6	5
(New Zealand) B Cordwell (New Zealand) J Richardson	1	2
2	(West Germany) C Kohde-Kilsch (Czechoslovakia) H Mandlíková	6	6

Second round
7	(United States) A Moulton (United States) P Smith	6	6
(United States) S Margolin (United States) B Norton	0	0
(United States) G Rush (United States) R White	7	6
14	(Socialist Federal Republic of Yugoslavia) M Jaušovec (United Kingdom) V Wade	6	2
10	(Switzerland) C Jolissaint (Netherlands) M Mesker	2	7	7
(United States) C Copeland (United States) L McNeil	6	6	5
(United States) A M Fernandez (Australia) P Whytcross	4	0
2	(West Germany) C Kohde-Kilsch (Czechoslovakia) H Mandlíková	6	6

Third round
7	(United States) A Moulton (United States) P Smith	2	6	6
(United States) G Rush (United States) R White	6	4	1
10	(Switzerland) C Jolissaint (Netherlands) M Mesker	6	6	6
2	(West Germany) C Kohde-Kilsch (Czechoslovakia) H Mandlíková	7	3	4

Quarterfinals
7	(United States) A Moulton (United States) P Smith	2	4
10	(Switzerland) C Jolissaint (Netherlands) M Mesker	6	6
