= 1984 US Open – Women's singles =

Women's singles
- 1984 US Open

Final
- Champion: (United States) Martina Navratilova
- Runner-up: (United States) Chris Evert
- Score: 4–6, 6–4, 6–4

Details
- Draw: 128
- Seeds: 16

Events
Singles	men	women		boys	girls
Doubles	men	women	mixed	boys	girls
WC Singles	men	women	quad
WC Doubles	men	women	quad
Legends	men	women	mixed
← 1983 ·	US Open	· 1985 →

Defending champion Martina Navratilova defeated Chris Evert in a rematch of the previous year's final, 4–6, 6–4, 6–4 to win the women's singles tennis title at the 1984 US Open. It was her second US Open singles title and eleventh major singles title overall. The victory marked Navratilova's sixth consecutive major singles title, tying Margaret Court and Maureen Connolly's all-time record. She became the first player to win the Surface Slam (winning majors on clay, grass, and hardcourt in the same year), having won the French Open and Wimbledon Championships. The final is considered one of the best matches in US Open history.

This marked the first major appearance of future champion Gabriela Sabatini; she was defeated in the third round by Helena Suková. Additionally, this was the US Open main drawn debut of future five-time champion Steffi Graf.

== Seeds ==
1. (United States) Martina Navratilova (champion)
2. (United States) Chris Evert (final)
3. (Czechoslovakia) Hana Mandlíková (quarterfinals)
4. (United States) Pam Shriver (quarterfinals)
5. (United States) Kathy Jordan (second round)
6. (Bulgaria) Manuela Maleeva (first round)
7. (United States) Zina Garrison (third round)
8. (West Germany) Claudia Kohde-Kilsch (fourth round)
9. (United States) Lisa Bonder (fourth round)
10. (United Kingdom) Jo Durie (first round)
11. (United States) Kathy Horvath (first round)
12. (United States) Bonnie Gadusek (fourth round)
13. (Australia) Wendy Turnbull (semifinals)
14. (Canada) Carling Bassett (semifinals)
15. (United States) Barbara Potter (fourth round)
16. (Hungary) Andrea Temesvári (third round)

== Draw ==
=== Key ===
- Q = Qualifier
- WC = Wild card
- LL = Lucky loser
- Alt = Alternate
- ITF = ITF entry
- PR = Protected ranking
- SR = Special ranking
- SE = Special exempt
- JE = Junior exempt
- JR = Junior Accelerator Programme entrant
- CO = College Accelerator Programme entrant
- NG = Next Gen Accelerator Program entrant
- w/o = Walkover
- r = Retired
- d = Defaulted

=== Finals ===
Quarterfinals
1	(United States) Martina Navratilova	6	6
(Czechoslovakia) Helena Suková	3	3
4	(United States) Pam Shriver	6	3	3
13	(Australia) Wendy Turnbull	2	6	6
14	(Canada) Carling Bassett	6	6
3	(Czechoslovakia) Hana Mandlíková	4	3
(West Germany) Sylvia Hanika	2	3
2	(United States) Chris Evert	6	6

Semifinals
1	(United States) Martina Navratilova	6	6
13	(Australia) Wendy Turnbull	4	1
14	(Canada) Carling Bassett	2	2
2	(United States) Chris Evert	6	6

Final
1	(United States) Martina Navratilova	4	6	6
2	(United States) Chris Evert	6	4	4

=== Top half ===
==== Section 1 ====
First round
1	(United States) M Navratilova	6	6
(United States) L Antonoplis	4	2
(United States) A Leand	6	6
(United States) B Nagelsen	1	4
LL	(West Germany) M Schropp	3	4
(France) N Herreman	6	6
(Sweden) C Jexell	4	3
(South Africa) J Mundel	6	6
Q	(United States) P Fendick	6	7
(Sweden) C Karlsson	2	5
WC	(United States) K Steinmetz	6	1
(France) M-C Calleja	7	6
(United States) S Collins	6	6
(United Kingdom) A Hobbs	4	2
Q	(United States) S Rehe	4	6	6
15	(United States) B Potter	6	0	7

Second round
1	(United States) M Navratilova	6	6
(United States) A Leand	4	2
(France) N Herreman	6	2
(South Africa) J Mundel	7	6
Q	(United States) P Fendick	6	6
(France) M-C Calleja	3	3
(United States) S Collins	3	6
15	(United States) B Potter	6	7

Third round
1	(United States) M Navratilova	6	6
(South Africa) J Mundel	0	0
Q	(United States) P Fendick	2	6	2
15	(United States) B Potter	6	4	6

Fourth round
1	(United States) M Navratilova	6	6
15	(United States) B Potter	4	4

==== Section 2 ====
First round
9	(United States) L Bonder	6	7
(Peru) P Vásquez	1	5
(United States) D Spence	6	3	7
(United States) A Moulton	4	6	6
(South Africa) R Uys	4	6	6
WC	(United States) T Mochizuki	6	3	2
(South Africa) Y Vermaak	6	6
(France) C Vanier	4	1
(Argentina) G Sabatini	6	3	6
WC	(United States) P Smith	3	6	2
(Peru) L Arraya	2	3
(United States) K Shaefer	6	6
(United States) L Howell	3	6
(Czechoslovakia) H Suková	6	7
(Switzerland) C Jolissaint	0	5
5	(United States) K Jordan	6	7

Second round
9	(United States) L Bonder	5	7	6
(United States) D Spence	7	5	3
(South Africa) R Uys	6	3
(South Africa) Y Vermaak	7	6
(Argentina) G Sabatini	6	6
(United States) K Shaefer	4	1
(Czechoslovakia) H Suková	6	6
5	(United States) K Jordan	3	3

Third round
9	(United States) L Bonder	6	6
(South Africa) Y Vermaak	1	0
(Argentina) G Sabatini	4	4
(Czechoslovakia) H Suková	6	6

Fourth round
9	(United States) L Bonder	6	5	4
(Czechoslovakia) H Suková	4	7	6

==== Section 3 ====
First round
4	(United States) P Shriver	6	6
Q	(United States) B Bowes	0	2
(United States) J Klitch	7	6
(United States) W White	6	2
(United Kingdom) V Wade	6	7
(United States) M-L Piatek	0	6
(United States) M Louie	6	6
WC	(United States) K Sands	4	3
(France) C Suire	1	4
(Romania) V Ruzici	6	6
(United States) J Golder	1	6	6
(United States) L Spain	6	2	2
(United States) M Torres	6	6
(United States) A Kiyomura-Hayashi	0	2
(United States) S Mascarin	7	6
11	(United States) K Horvath	6	0

Second round
4	(United States) P Shriver	6	6
(United States) J Klitch	3	2
(United Kingdom) V Wade	2	6	3
(United States) M Louie	6	3	6
(Romania) V Ruzici	1	6	6
(United States) J Golder	6	2	4
(United States) M Torres	4	6	2
(United States) S Mascarin	6	3	6

Third round
4	(United States) P Shriver	6	7
(United States) M Louie	3	5
(Romania) V Ruzici	2	6	2
(United States) S Mascarin	6	3	6

Fourth round
4	(United States) P Shriver
(United States) S Mascarin	w/o

==== Section 4 ====
First round
13	(Australia) W Turnbull	6	6
(United States) C Reynolds	1	1
Q	(United States) R Reis	7	3	4
(United States) G Kim	6	6	6
(South Africa) B Mould	6	6
(United States) G Rush	4	4
(Puerto Rico) G Fernández	7	6
(Brazil) C Monteiro	5	3
(United States) K Cummings	4	2
(Sweden) C Lindqvist	6	6
(United States) L-A Thompson	5	4
(France) C Tanvier	7	6
(United States) K Rinaldi	6	6
(Netherlands) M Mesker	3	3
(United Kingdom) A Brown	5	3
8	(West Germany) C Kohde-Kilsch	7	6

Second round
13	(Australia) W Turnbull	6	7
(United States) G Kim	1	5
(South Africa) B Mould	7	6
(Puerto Rico) G Fernández	6	4
(Sweden) C Lindqvist	7	6
(France) C Tanvier	5	4
(United States) K Rinaldi	4	2
8	(West Germany) C Kohde-Kilsch	6	6

Third round
13	(Australia) W Turnbull	6	1	6
(South Africa) B Mould	3	6	1
(Sweden) C Lindqvist	6	2	2
8	(West Germany) C Kohde-Kilsch	2	6	6

Fourth round
13	(Australia) W Turnbull	6	6
8	(West Germany) C Kohde-Kilsch	3	1

=== Bottom half ===
==== Section 5 ====
First round
6	(Bulgaria) M Maleeva	1	7	5
Q	(Switzerland) P Jauch-Delhees	6	5	7
(West Germany) P Keppeler	6	7
(United States) K Latham	3	6
(United States) M Gurney	6	6
(United States) T Phelps	3	0
WC	(United States) R Casals	1	6	6
(Australia) S Leo	6	4	4
(Socialist Federal Republic of Yugoslavia) M Jaušovec	6	6
(United States) H Ludloff	2	1
(France) S Amiach	3	5
(United States) A Henricksson	6	7
Q	(United States) B Bramblett	2	2
(France) P Paradis	6	6
(Australia) E Sayers	4	2
14	(Canada) C Bassett	6	6

Second round
Q	(Switzerland) P Jauch-Delhees	6	7
(West Germany) P Keppeler	0	6
(United States) M Gurney	6	6
WC	(United States) R Casals	0	3
(Socialist Federal Republic of Yugoslavia) M Jaušovec	6	7
(United States) A Henricksson	1	6
(France) P Paradis	6	6
14	(Canada) C Bassett	7	7

Third round
Q	(Switzerland) P Jauch-Delhees	7	6
(United States) M Gurney	5	1
(Socialist Federal Republic of Yugoslavia) M Jaušovec	6	0
14	(Canada) C Bassett	7	6

Fourth round
Q	(Switzerland) P Jauch-Delhees	1	1
14	(Canada) C Bassett	6	6

==== Section 6 ====
First round
10	(United Kingdom) J Durie	6	5	4
(Australia) A Minter	2	7	6
(Czechoslovakia) M Skuherská	6	7	6
(United States) J Harrington	7	6	4
(United States) E Raponi-Longo	3	0
(United States) V Nelson	6	6
(Romania) L Romanov	6	4	2
(United States) L McNeil	0	6	6
(United States) A White	6	6	7
(United States) C Benjamin	4	7	6
(Japan) E Inoue	6	6
(United States) P Teeguarden	2	1
(Denmark) T Scheuer-Larsen	6	6
(Argentina) A Villagrán	3	3
(Brazil) P Medrado	1	6	2
3	(Czechoslovakia) H Mandlíková	6	4	6

Second round
(Australia) A Minter	6	6
(Czechoslovakia) M Skuherská	2	1
(United States) V Nelson	7	4	3
(United States) L McNeil	5	6	6
(United States) A White	6	4	7
(Japan) E Inoue	3	6	5
(Denmark) T Scheuer-Larsen	2	0
3	(Czechoslovakia) H Mandlíková	6	6

Third round
(Australia) A Minter	4	6	2
(United States) L McNeil	6	3	6
(United States) A White	1	1
3	(Czechoslovakia) H Mandlíková	6	6

Fourth round
(United States) L McNeil	6	4	2
3	(Czechoslovakia) H Mandlíková	3	6	6

==== Section 7 ====
First round
7	(United States) Z Garrison	6	6
(Socialist Federal Republic of Yugoslavia) S Goleš	2	4
(Italy) R Reggi	6	6
Q	(United States) K Huebner	2	0
(West Germany) S Graf	4	2
(West Germany) S Hanika	6	6
(United Kingdom) S Barker	2	4
(Czechoslovakia) K Skronská	6	6
WC	(United States) S Solomon	4	2
Q	(Sweden) C Anderholm	6	6
(Austria) P Huber	4	6	6
(United States) L Allen	6	1	1
(United States) E Burgin	6	6
(Italy) A-M Cecchini	2	1
(South Africa) R Fairbank	6	6	3
16	(Hungary) A Temesvári	7	2	6

Second round
7	(United States) Z Garrison	3	6	6
(Italy) R Reggi	6	1	0
(West Germany) S Hanika	6	6
(Czechoslovakia) K Skronská	3	2
Q	(Sweden) C Anderholm	5	0
(Austria) P Huber	7	6
(United States) E Burgin	5	4
16	(Hungary) A Temesvári	7	6

Third round
7	(United States) Z Garrison	3	2
(West Germany) S Hanika	6	6
(Austria) P Huber	6	6
16	(Hungary) A Temesvári	1	4

Fourth round
(West Germany) S Hanika	6	7
(Austria) P Huber	4	5

==== Section 8 ====
First round
12	(United States) B Gadusek	6	6
(United Kingdom) A Croft	4	4
WC	(United States) M Schillig	0	0
(United States) P Casale	6	6
(United States) J Russell	3	2
(United States) K Gompert	6	6
(United States) B Gerken	6	6
(United States) R White	3	4
(United States) M Brown	6	3	4
(West Germany) B Bunge	4	6	6
(United States) G Purdy	6	4
(Czechoslovakia) I Budařová	7	6
(United States) T Holladay	6	6
WC	(United States) A Holton	4	3
(United States) S Walsh	0	0
2	(United States) C Evert	6	6

Second round
12	(United States) B Gadusek	2	6	6
(United States) P Casale	6	3	4
(United States) K Gompert	2	1
(United States) B Gerken	6	6
(West Germany) B Bunge	2	7	6
(Czechoslovakia) I Budařová	6	5	1
(United States) T Holladay	1	1
2	(United States) C Evert	6	6

Third round
12	(United States) B Gadusek	6	7
(United States) B Gerken	3	5
(West Germany) B Bunge	1	3
2	(United States) C Evert	6	6

Fourth round
12	(United States) B Gadusek	4	0
2	(United States) C Evert	6	6

== See also ==
- Evert–Navratilova rivalry

Preceded by 1984 Wimbledon Championships – Women's singles	Grand Slam women's singles	Succeeded by 1984 Australian Open – Women's singles
