= Rye Brook Open =

Defunct tennis tournament
- Event name: Rye Brook
- Tour: Grand Prix circuit
- Founded: 1987
- Abolished: 1988
- Editions: 2
- Location: Rye Brook, New York, U.S.
- Surface: Hard / outdoor

The Rye Brook Open was a Grand Prix affiliated men's tennis tournament held in Rye Brook, New York. It was held twice: once in 1987 and once in 1988 and both were held on outdoor hard courts.

== Results ==
=== Singles ===
Year	Champions	Runners-up	Score
1987	(Sweden) Peter Lundgren	(United States) John Ross	6–7, 7–5, 6–3
1988	(Czechoslovakia) Milan Šrejber	(India) Ramesh Krishnan	6–2, 7–6

=== Doubles ===
Year	Champions	Runners-up	Score
1987	(United States) Lloyd Bourne (United States) Jeff Klaparda	(Australia) Carl Limberger (Australia) Mark Woodforde	6–3, 6–2
1988	(United Kingdom) Andrew Castle (United States) Tim Wilkison	(United Kingdom) Jeremy Bates (Denmark) Michael Mortensen	4–6, 7–5, 7–6
