= Carl Limberger =

Australian tennis player

- Country (sports): Australia
- Born: 24 January 1964 (age 62) Wagga Wagga, New South Wales, Australia
- Height: 170 cm (5 ft 7 in)
- Turned pro: 1983
- Plays: Right-handed
- Prize money: $431,503

Singles
- Career record: 34–76
- Career titles: 0
- Highest ranking: No. 71 (11 May 1987)

Doubles
- Career record: 78–113
- Career titles: 1
- Highest ranking: No. 53 (6 July 1987)

Grand Slam doubles results
- Australian Open: 2R (1985, 1988)
- French Open: 2R (1987, 1988, 1992)
- Wimbledon: QF (1987)
- US Open: 2R (1992)

Carl Limberger (born 24 January 1964) is a former professional tennis player from Australia.

Limberger won one doubles title and reached eight doubles finals when on the ATP Circuit. His highest singles ranking was World Number 71 on 11 May 1987. His highest doubles ranking was World Number 53 on 6 July 1987. The right-hander resides in Sydney.

== Career finals ==
=== Doubles: 8 (1 win – 7 losses) ===
Result	W/L	Date	Tournament	Surface	Partner	Opponents	Score
Loss	0–1	Sep 1982	Geneva, Switzerland	Clay	(South Africa) Mike Myburg	(Czechoslovakia) Pavel Složil (Czechoslovakia) Tomáš Šmíd	0–6, 4–6
Loss	0–2	May 1985	Florence, Italy	Clay	(Australia) Bruce Derlin	(Australia) David Graham (Australia) Laurie Warder	1–6, 1–6
Loss	0–3	Jul 1985	Hilversum, Netherlands	Clay	(Australia) Mark Woodforde	(Sweden) Hans Simonsson (Sweden) Stefan Simonsson	3–6, 2–6
Loss	0–4	Jan 1987	Auckland, New Zealand	Hard	(Australia) Mark Woodforde	(United States) Kelly Jones (United States) Brad Pearce	6–7, 6–7
Loss	0–5	Aug 1987	Rye Brook, U.S.	Hard	(Australia) Mark Woodforde	(United States) Lloyd Bourne (United States) Jeff Klaparda	3–6, 2–6
Loss	0–6	Jan 1988	Adelaide, Australia	Hard	(Australia) Mark Woodforde	(Australia) Darren Cahill (Australia) Mark Kratzmann	6–4, 2–6, 5–7
Win	1–6	Oct 1992	Guarujá, Brazil	Hard	(Sweden) Christer Allgårdh	(Uruguay) Diego Pérez (Spain) Francisco Roig	6–4, 6–3
Loss	1–7	Nov 1992	São Paulo, Brazil	Hard	(Sweden) Christer Allgårdh	(Uruguay) Diego Pérez (Spain) Francisco Roig	2–6, 6–7
