= Mark Woodforde =

Australian tennis player

Mark Woodforde OAM
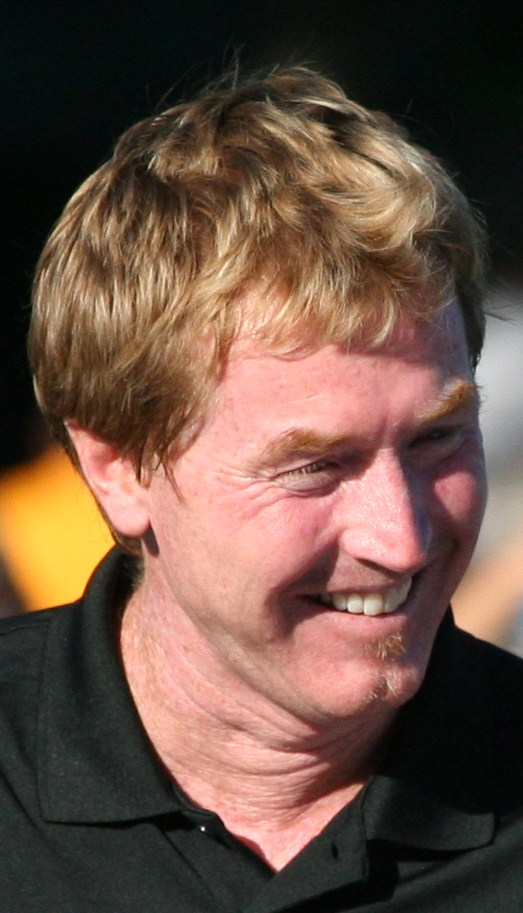
- Full name: Mark Raymond Woodforde
- Country (sports): Australia
- Residence: Rancho Mirage, California, U.S.
- Born: 23 September 1965 (age 60) Adelaide, South Australia, Australia
- Height: 187 cm (6 ft 2 in)
- Turned pro: 1984
- Retired: 2000
- Plays: Left-handed (two-handed backhand)
- Prize money: $8,551,305
- Int. Tennis HoF: 2010 (member page)

Singles
- Career record: 319–312
- Career titles: 4
- Highest ranking: No. 19 (22 April 1996)

Grand Slam singles results
- Australian Open: SF (1996)
- French Open: 4R (1997)
- Wimbledon: 4R (1988, 1990, 1997)
- US Open: 4R (1987, 1988)

Other tournaments
- Grand Slam Cup: QF (1996)

Doubles
- Career record: 647–248
- Career titles: 67
- Highest ranking: No. 1 (16 November 1992)

Grand Slam doubles results
- Australian Open: W (1992, 1997)
- French Open: W (2000)
- Wimbledon: W (1993, 1994, 1995, 1996, 1997, 2000)
- US Open: W (1989, 1995, 1996)

Other doubles tournaments
- Tour Finals: W (1992, 1996)

Mixed doubles
- Career titles: 5

Grand Slam mixed doubles results
- Australian Open: W (1992, 1996)
- French Open: W (1995)
- Wimbledon: W (1993)
- US Open: W (1992)
Medal record
Representing Australia
Olympic Games
Gold medal – first place	1996 Atlanta	Doubles
Silver medal – second place	2000 Sydney	Doubles

Mark Raymond Woodforde, OAM (born 23 September 1965) is a former professional tennis player from Australia. He is best known as one half of "The Woodies", a doubles partnership with Todd Woodbridge.

Woodforde was born in Adelaide, and joined the men's professional tennis ATP Tour in 1984. Woodforde won four singles titles, including his hometown Adelaide tournament twice. His best singles result in a Grand Slam was reaching the semi-final of the Australian Open in 1996, his 38th Grand Slam singles tournament, which remains a record for the longest time taken to reach a maiden semi-final. Woodforde is best known for his doubles success, having won twelve Grand Slam doubles titles in his career – one French Open, two Australian Opens, three US Opens, and a record six Wimbledons. Eleven of these victories came as a member of the Woodies, and he won the 1989 US Open doubles with John McEnroe. He also won five Grand Slam mixed doubles titles – one French Open, two Australian Opens, one US Open, and one Wimbledon; thus making an overall total of 17 Grand Slam doubles titles. He reached the world No. 1 doubles ranking in November 1992.

He enjoyed the greatest success of his career when playing men's doubles with Woodbridge, combining his left-hand baseline play with Woodbridge's swift volleying reflexes at the net. They were the ATP Doubles Team of the Year four times, and all together the Woodies won 61 ATP doubles tournaments (Woodforde won 67 in his career).

Woodforde's other career highlights included a gold medal at the 1996 Atlanta Olympics, and a silver medal at the 2000 Sydney Olympics. Woodforde was awarded the Medal of the Order of the Australia in the 1997 Australia Day Honours "for service to sport as gold medallist at the Atlanta Olympic Games, 1996".

Woodforde played for the Australian Davis Cup Team in three Davis Cup finals, including teaming with Woodbridge to clinch the 1999 win over France in Paris to give Australia its first Davis Cup victory in 13 years.

Woodforde retired from professional tennis in 2000 after a Davis Cup final loss to Spain, and was appointed the coach of Australia's Fed Cup team in 2003. He has since provided commentary for tennis on Fox Sports and ESPN.

In January 2010 on Australia Day, the Woodies were inducted to the Australian Tennis Hall of Fame for their achievements in tennis. As a part of the induction ceremony, their bronzed statues were placed with other great Australian tennis players at Melbourne Park.

In 2014, alongside Woodbridge, the International Tennis Federation (ITF) presented him with its highest accolade, the Philippe Chatrier Award, for his contributions to tennis.

== Grand Slam finals ==
=== Doubles: 16 (12 titles, 4 runners-up) ===
By winning the 2000 French Open, Woodforde completed the career Grand Slam.

Result	Year	Championship	Surface	Partner	Opponents	Score
Win	1989	US Open	Hard	(United States) John McEnroe	(United States) Ken Flach (United States) Robert Seguso	6–4, 4–6, 6–3, 6–3
Win	1992	Australian Open	Hard	(Australia) Todd Woodbridge	(United States) Kelly Jones (United States) Rick Leach	6–4, 6–3, 6–4
Win	1993	Wimbledon	Grass	(Australia) Todd Woodbridge	(Canada) Grant Connell (United States) Patrick Galbraith	7–6, 6–3, 7–6
Win	1994	Wimbledon	Grass	(Australia) Todd Woodbridge	(Canada) Grant Connell (United States) Patrick Galbraith	7–6, 6–3, 6–1
Loss	1994	US Open	Hard	(Australia) Todd Woodbridge	(Netherlands) Jacco Eltingh (Netherlands) Paul Haarhuis	3–6, 6–7^{(6)}
Win	1995	Wimbledon	Grass	(Australia) Todd Woodbridge	(United States) Rick Leach (United States) Scott Melville	7–5, 7–6, 7–6
Win	1995	US Open	Hard	(Australia) Todd Woodbridge	(United States) Alex O'Brien (Australia) Sandon Stolle	6–3, 6–3
Win	1996	Wimbledon	Grass	(Australia) Todd Woodbridge	(Zimbabwe) Byron Black (Canada) Grant Connell	4–6, 6–1, 6–3, 6–2
Win	1996	US Open	Hard	(Australia) Todd Woodbridge	(Netherlands) Jacco Eltingh (Netherlands) Paul Haarhuis	4–6, 7–6, 7–6
Win	1997	Australian Open	Hard	(Australia) Todd Woodbridge	(Canada) Sébastien Lareau (United States) Alex O'Brien	4–6, 7–5, 7–5, 6–3
Loss	1997	French Open	Clay	(Australia) Todd Woodbridge	(Russia) Yevgeny Kafelnikov (Czech Republic) Daniel Vacek	6–7^{(12)}, 6–4, 3–6
Win	1997	Wimbledon	Grass	(Australia) Todd Woodbridge	(Netherlands) Jacco Eltingh (Netherlands) Paul Haarhuis	7–6, 7–6, 5–7, 6–3
Loss	1998	Australian Open	Hard	(Australia) Todd Woodbridge	(Sweden) Jonas Björkman (Netherlands) Jacco Eltingh	2–6, 7–5, 6–2, 4–6, 3–6
Loss	1998	Wimbledon	Grass	(Australia) Todd Woodbridge	(Netherlands) Jacco Eltingh (Netherlands) Paul Haarhuis	6–2, 4–6, 6–7^{(3)}, 7–5, 8–10
Win	2000	French Open	Clay	(Australia) Todd Woodbridge	(Netherlands) Paul Haarhuis (Australia) Sandon Stolle	7–6, 6–4
Win	2000	Wimbledon	Grass	(Australia) Todd Woodbridge	(Netherlands) Paul Haarhuis (Australia) Sandon Stolle	6–3, 6–4, 6–1

=== Mixed doubles: 7 (5 titles, 2 runners-up) ===
Result	Year	Championship	Surface	Partner	Opponents	Score
Win	1992	Australian Open	Hard	(Australia) Nicole Provis	(Spain) Arantxa Sánchez Vicario (Australia) Todd Woodbridge	6–3, 4–6, 11–9
Win	1992	US Open	Hard	(Australia) Nicole Provis	(Czech Republic) Helena Suková (Netherlands) Tom Nijssen	4–6, 6–3, 6–3
Win	1993	Wimbledon	Grass	(United States) Martina Navratilova	(Netherlands) Manon Bollegraf (Netherlands) Tom Nijssen	6–3, 6–4
Loss	1993	US Open	Hard	(United States) Martina Navratilova	(Czech Republic) Helena Suková (Australia) Todd Woodbridge	3–6, 6–7
Win	1995	French Open	Clay	(Latvia) Larisa Savchenko-Neiland	(Canada) Jill Hetherington (South Africa) John-Laffnie de Jager	7–6^{(10–8)}, 7–6^{(7–4)}
Win	1996	Australian Open	Hard	(Latvia) Larisa Savchenko Neiland	(United States) Nicole Arendt (United States) Luke Jensen	4–6, 7–5, 6–0
Loss	1996	Wimbledon	Grass	(Latvia) Larisa Savchenko Neiland	(Czech Republic) Helena Suková (Czech Republic) Cyril Suk	6–1, 3–6, 2–6

== Career finals ==
=== Doubles (67–24) ===
Legend Grand Slam (12) Tennis Masters Cup (2) Olympic Gold (1) ATP Masters Series (14) ATP Championship Series (11) ATP Tour (27)	Titles by surface Hard (36) Clay (9) Grass (10) Carpet (12)

Result	No.	Date	Tournament	Surface	Partner	Opponents	Score
Loss	1.	Jul 1985	Hilversum, Netherlands	Clay	(Australia) Carl Limberger	(Sweden) Stefan Simonsson (Sweden) Hans Simonsson	3–6, 4–6
Loss	2.	Jan 1987	Auckland, New Zealand	Hard	(Australia) Carl Limberger	(United States) Kelly Jones (United States) Brad Pearce	6–7, 6–7
Loss	3.	Jul 1987	Bordeaux, France	Clay	(Australia) Darren Cahill	(Spain) Sergio Casal (Spain) Emilio Sánchez	3–6, 3–6
Loss	4.	Aug 1987	Rye Brook, U.S.	Hard	(Australia) Carl Limberger	(United States) Lloyd Bourne (United States) Jeff Klaparda	3–6, 3–6
Loss	5.	Jan 1988	Adelaide, Australia	Hard	(Australia) Carl Limberger	(Australia) Darren Cahill (Australia) Mark Kratzmann	6–4, 2–6, 5–7
Win	1.	Sep 1988	Los Angeles, U.S.	Hard	(United States) John McEnroe	(Belgium) Libor Pimek (Netherlands) Michiel Schapers	6–4, 6–4
Win	2.	Oct 1988	San Francisco, U.S.	Carpet	(United States) John McEnroe	(United States) Rick Leach (United States) Jim Pugh	6–4, 7–6
Win	3.	May 1989	Monte Carlo, Monaco	Clay	(Czechoslovakia) Tomáš Šmíd	(Italy) Paolo Canè (Italy) Diego Nargiso	1–6, 6–4, 6–2
Win	4.	May 1989	US Open	Hard	(United States) John McEnroe	(United States) Ken Flach (United States) Robert Seguso	6–4, 4–6, 6–3, 6–3
Loss	6.	Oct 1990	Brisbane, Australia	Hard	(United States) Brian Garrow	(Australia) Jason Stoltenberg (Australia) Todd Woodbridge	6–2, 4–6, 4–6
Win	5.	Feb 1991	Brussels, Belgium	Carpet	(Australia) Todd Woodbridge	(Belgium) Libor Pimek (Netherlands) Michiel Schapers	6–3, 6–0
Win	6.	Mar 1991	Copenhagen, Denmark	Carpet	(Australia) Todd Woodbridge	(Iran) Mansour Bahrami (Soviet Union) Andrei Olhovskiy	6–3, 6–1
Win	7.	Jun 1991	London/Queen's Club, England	Grass	(Australia) Todd Woodbridge	(Canada) Grant Connell (Canada) Glenn Michibata	7–6, 6–4
Win	8.	Sep 1991	Brisbane, Australia	Hard	(Australia) Todd Woodbridge	(Australia) John Fitzgerald (Canada) Glenn Michibata	7–6, 6–3
Win	9.	Jan 1992	Australian Open	Hard	(Australia) Todd Woodbridge	(United States) Kelly Jones (United States) Rick Leach	6–4, 6–3, 6–4
Win	10.	Feb 1992	Memphis, U.S.	Hard (i)	(Australia) Todd Woodbridge	(United States) Kevin Curren (South Africa) Gary Muller	7–6, 6–1
Win	11.	Feb 1992	Philadelphia, U.S.	Carpet (i)	(Australia) Todd Woodbridge	(United States) Jim Grabb (United States) Richey Reneberg	6–4, 7–6
Win	12.	Apr 1992	Singapore	Hard	(Australia) Todd Woodbridge	(Canada) Grant Connell (Canada) Glenn Michibata	6–7, 6–2, 6–4
Win	13.	Aug 1992	Cincinnati, U.S.	Hard	(Australia) Todd Woodbridge	(United States) Patrick McEnroe (United States) Jonathan Stark	7–6, 6–4
Win	14.	Oct 1992	Tokyo, Japan	Hard (i)	(Australia) Todd Woodbridge	(United States) Jim Grabb (United States) Richey Reneberg	7–6, 7–6
Win	15.	Nov 1992	Stockholm, Sweden	Carpet (i)	(Australia) Todd Woodbridge	(United States) Steve DeVries (Australia) David Macpherson	6–3, 6–4
Win	16.	Nov 1992	Doubles Championships, Johannesburg	Hard (i)	(Australia) Todd Woodbridge	(Australia) John Fitzgerald (Sweden) Anders Järryd	6–2, 7–6, 5–7, 3–6, 6–3
Win	17.	Jan 1993	Adelaide, Australia	Hard	(Australia) Todd Woodbridge	(Australia) John Fitzgerald (Australia) Laurie Warder	6–4, 7–5
Win	18.	Feb 1993	Memphis, U.S.	Hard (i)	(Australia) Todd Woodbridge	(Netherlands) Jacco Eltingh (Netherlands) Paul Haarhuis	6–4, 4–6, 6–3
Win	19.	Jun 1993	London/Queen's Club, UK	Grass	(Australia) Todd Woodbridge	(United Kingdom) Neil Broad (South Africa) Gary Muller	6–4, 6–7, 6–3
Win	20.	Jul 1993	Wimbledon, UK	Grass	(Australia) Todd Woodbridge	(Canada) Grant Connell (United States) Patrick Galbraith	7–6, 6–3, 7–6
Win	21.	Nov 1993	Stockholm, Sweden	Carpet (i)	(Australia) Todd Woodbridge	(South Africa) Gary Muller (South Africa) Danie Visser	7–6, 5–7, 7–6
Loss	7.	Nov 1993	Doubles Championships, Johannesburg	Hard (i)	(Australia) Todd Woodbridge	(Netherlands) Jacco Eltingh (Netherlands) Paul Haarhuis	6–7, 6–7, 4–6
Win	22.	Feb 1994	Dubai, UAE	Hard	(Australia) Todd Woodbridge	(Australia) Darren Cahill (Australia) John Fitzgerald	6–7, 6–4, 6–2
Win	23.	Apr 1994	Nice, France	Clay	(Spain) Javier Sánchez	(Netherlands) Hendrik Jan Davids (South Africa) Piet Norval	7–5, 6–3
Win	24.	May 1994	Pinehurst, U.S.	Clay	(Australia) Todd Woodbridge	(United States) Jared Palmer (United States) Richey Reneberg	6–2, 3–6, 6–3
Loss	8.	Jun 1994	London/Queen's Club, UK	Grass	(Australia) Todd Woodbridge	(Sweden) Jan Apell (Sweden) Jonas Björkman	7–5, 6–7, 4–6
Win	25.	Jul 1994	Wimbledon, UK	Grass	(Australia) Todd Woodbridge	(Canada) Grant Connell (United States) Patrick Galbraith	7–6, 6–3, 6–1
Win	26.	Aug 1994	Los Angeles, U.S.	Hard	(Australia) John Fitzgerald	(United States) Scott Davis (United States) Brian MacPhie	4–6, 6–2, 6–0
Win	27.	Aug 1994	Indianapolis, U.S.	Hard	(Australia) Todd Woodbridge	(United States) Jim Grabb (United States) Richey Reneberg	6–4, 6–2
Loss	9.	Sep 1994	US Open	Hard	(Australia) Todd Woodbridge	(Netherlands) Jacco Eltingh (Netherlands) Paul Haarhuis	3–6, 6–7
Win	28.	Oct 1994	Stockholm, Sweden	Carpet (i)	(Australia) Todd Woodbridge	(Sweden) Jan Apell (Sweden) Jonas Björkman	6–4, 4–6, 6–3
Loss	10.	Nov 1994	Doubles Championships, Jakarta	Hard (i)	(Australia) Todd Woodbridge	(Sweden) Jan Apell (Sweden) Jonas Björkman	4–6, 6–4, 6–4, 6–7, 6–7
Win	29.	Jan 1995	Sydney, Australia	Hard	(Australia) Todd Woodbridge	(United States) Trevor Kronemann (Australia) David Macpherson	7–6, 6–4
Win	30.	Mar 1995	Miami, U.S.	Hard	(Australia) Todd Woodbridge	(United States) Jim Grabb (United States) Patrick McEnroe	6–4, 3–6, 7–6
Win	31.	May 1995	Pinehurst, U.S.	Clay	(Australia) Todd Woodbridge	(United States) Alex O'Brien (Australia) Sandon Stolle	6–2, 6–4
Win	32	May 1995	Delray Beach, U.S.	Clay	(Australia) Todd Woodbridge	(Spain) Sergio Casal (Spain) Emilio Sánchez	6–3, 6–1
Win	33.	Jul 1995	Wimbledon, UK	Grass	(Australia) Todd Woodbridge	(United States) Rick Leach (United States) Scott Melville	7–5, 7–6, 7–6
Win	34.	Aug 1995	Cincinnati, U.S.	Hard	(Australia) Todd Woodbridge	(The Bahamas) Mark Knowles (Canada) Daniel Nestor	6–4, 6–4
Win	35.	Sep 1995	US Open	Hard	(Australia) Todd Woodbridge	(United States) Alex O'Brien (Australia) Sandon Stolle	6–3, 6–3
Loss	11.	Oct 1995	Vienna, Austria	Carpet	(Australia) Todd Woodbridge	(South Africa) Ellis Ferreira (Netherlands) Jan Siemerink	4–6, 5–7
Win	36.	Jan 1996	Adelaide, Australia	Hard	(Australia) Todd Woodbridge	(Sweden) Jonas Björkman (United States) Tommy Ho	7–5, 7–6
Loss	12.	Feb 1996	Memphis, U.S.	Hard (i)	(Australia) Todd Woodbridge	(The Bahamas) Mark Knowles (Canada) Daniel Nestor	4–6, 5–7
Win	37.	Mar 1996	Philadelphia, U.S.	Carpet (i)	(Australia) Todd Woodbridge	(Zimbabwe) Byron Black (Canada) Grant Connell	7–6, 6–2
Win	38.	Mar 1996	Indian Wells, U.S.	Hard	(Australia) Todd Woodbridge	(United States) Brian MacPhie (Australia) Michael Tebbutt	6–3, 6–4
Win	39.	Apr 1996	Miami Masters, U.S.	Hard	(Australia) Todd Woodbridge	(South Africa) Ellis Ferreira (United States) Patrick Galbraith	6–3, 6–7, 7–6
Win	40.	Apr 1996	Tokyo, Japan	Hard	(Australia) Todd Woodbridge	(The Bahamas) Mark Knowles (United States) Rick Leach	6–2, 6–3
Win	41.	May 1996	Coral Springs, U.S.	Clay	(Australia) Todd Woodbridge	(United States) Ivan Baron (United States) Brett Hansen-Dent	6–3, 6–3
Win	42.	Jun 1996	London/Queen's Club, UK	Grass	(Australia) Todd Woodbridge	(Canada) Sébastien Lareau (United States) Alex O'Brien	6–2, 6–7, 6–3
Win	43.	Jul 1996	Wimbledon, UK	Grass	(Australia) Todd Woodbridge	(Zimbabwe) Byron Black (Canada) Grant Connell	4–6, 6–1, 6–3, 6–2
Win	44.	Jul 1996	Summer Olympics, Atlanta	Hard	(Australia) Todd Woodbridge	(United Kingdom) Neil Broad (United Kingdom) Tim Henman	6–4, 6–4, 6–2
Win	45.	Sep 1996	US Open	Hard	(Australia) Todd Woodbridge	(Netherlands) Jacco Eltingh (Netherlands) Paul Haarhuis	4–6, 7–6, 7–6
Win	46.	Oct 1996	Singapore	Carpet	(Australia) Todd Woodbridge	(Czech Republic) Martin Damm (Russia) Andrei Olhovskiy	7–6, 7–6
Win	47.	Nov 1996	Doubles Championships, Hartford	Carpet	(Australia) Todd Woodbridge	(Canada) Sébastien Lareau (United States) Alex O'Brien	6–4, 5–7, 6–2, 7–6
Loss	13.	Jan 1997	Adelaide, Australia	Hard	(Australia) Todd Woodbridge	(Australia) Patrick Rafter (United States) Bryan Shelton	4–6, 6–1, 3–6
Win	48.	Jan 1997	Australian Open	Hard	(Australia) Todd Woodbridge	(Canada) Sébastien Lareau (United States) Alex O'Brien	4–6, 7–5, 7–5, 6–3
Win	49.	Mar 1997	Miami, U.S.	Hard	(Australia) Todd Woodbridge	(The Bahamas) Mark Knowles (Canada) Daniel Nestor	6–4, 3–6, 6–3
Loss	14.	Jun 1997	French Open	Clay	(Australia) Todd Woodbridge	(Russia) Yevgeny Kafelnikov (Czech Republic) Daniel Vacek	6–7, 6–4, 3–6
Win	50.	Jul 1997	Wimbledon, England	Grass	(Australia) Todd Woodbridge	(Netherlands) Jacco Eltingh (Netherlands) Paul Haarhuis	7–6, 7–6, 5–7, 6–3
Win	51.	Aug 1997	Cincinnati, U.S.	Hard	(Australia) Todd Woodbridge	(Australia) Mark Philippoussis (Australia) Patrick Rafter	6–4, 6–2
Win	52.	Oct 1997	Stuttgart, Germany	Carpet (i)	(Australia) Todd Woodbridge	(United States) Rick Leach (United States) Jonathan Stark	7–6, 7–6
Win	53.	Jan 1998	Sydney, Australia	Hard	(Australia) Todd Woodbridge	(Netherlands) Jacco Eltingh (Canada) Daniel Nestor	6–3, 7–5
Loss	15.	Feb 1998	Australian Open	Hard	(Australia) Todd Woodbridge	(Sweden) Jonas Björkman (Netherlands) Jacco Eltingh	2–6, 7–5, 6–2, 4–6, 3–6
Win	54.	Feb 1998	San Jose, U.S.	Hard (i)	(Australia) Todd Woodbridge	(Brazil) Nelson Aerts (Brazil) André Sá	6–1, 7–5
Win	55.	Feb 1998	Memphis, U.S.	Hard (i)	(Australia) Todd Woodbridge	(South Africa) Ellis Ferreira (Mexico) David Roditi	6–4, 6–2
Loss	16.	Apr 1998	Monte Carlo, Monaco	Clay	(Australia) Todd Woodbridge	(Netherlands) Jacco Eltingh (Netherlands) Paul Haarhuis	4–6, 2–6
Win	56.	May 1998	Munich, Germany	Clay	(Australia) Todd Woodbridge	(Australia) Joshua Eagle (Australia) Andrew Florent	6–0, 6–3
Loss	17.	Jul 1998	Wimbledon, England	Grass	(Australia) Todd Woodbridge	(Netherlands) Jacco Eltingh (Netherlands) Paul Haarhuis	6–2, 4–6, 6–7, 7–5, 8–10
Loss	18.	Oct 1998	Shanghai, China	Carpet (i)	(Australia) Todd Woodbridge	(India) Mahesh Bhupathi (India) Leander Paes	4–6, 7–6, 6–7
Win	57.	Oct 1998	Singapore	Carpet (i)	(Australia) Todd Woodbridge	(India) Mahesh Bhupathi (India) Leander Paes	6–2, 6–3
Win	58.	Feb 1999	San Jose, U.S.	Hard (i)	(Australia) Todd Woodbridge	(North Macedonia) Aleksandar Kitinov (Federal Republic of Yugoslavia) Nenad Zimonjić	7–5, 6–7, 6–4
Win	59.	Feb 1999	Memphis, U.S.	Hard (i)	(Australia) Todd Woodbridge	(Canada) Sébastien Lareau (United States) Alex O'Brien	6–4, 7–5
Loss	19.	May 1999	Atlanta, U.S.	Clay	(Australia) Todd Woodbridge	(United States) Patrick Galbraith (United States) Justin Gimelstob	7–5, 6–7, 3–6
Loss	20.	Jun 1999	London/Queen's Club, UK	Grass	(Australia) Todd Woodbridge	(Canada) Sébastien Lareau (United States) Alex O'Brien	3–6, 6–7
Loss	21.	Aug 1999	Cincinnati, U.S.	Hard	(Australia) Todd Woodbridge	(Zimbabwe) Byron Black (Sweden) Jonas Björkman	3–6, 6–7
Loss	22.	Oct 1999	Shanghai, China	Hard (i)	(Australia) Todd Woodbridge	(Canada) Sébastien Lareau (Canada) Daniel Nestor	5–7, 3–6
Loss	23.	Oct 1999	Singapore	Carpet (i)	(Australia) Todd Woodbridge	(Belarus) Max Mirnyi (Philippines) Eric Taino	3–6, 4–6
Win	60.	Jan 2000	Adelaide, Australia	Hard	(Australia) Todd Woodbridge	(Australia) Lleyton Hewitt (Australia) Sandon Stolle	6–4, 6–2
Win	61.	Jan 2000	Sydney, Australia	Hard	(Australia) Todd Woodbridge	(Australia) Lleyton Hewitt (Australia) Sandon Stolle	7–5, 6–4
Win	62.	Apr 2000	Miami, U.S.	Hard	(Australia) Todd Woodbridge	(Czech Republic) Martin Damm (Slovakia) Dominik Hrbatý	6–4, 6–1
Win	63.	May 2000	Hamburg, Germany	Clay	(Australia) Todd Woodbridge	(Australia) Wayne Arthurs (Australia) Sandon Stolle	6–7, 6–4, 6–3
Win	64.	Jun 2000	French Open, Paris	Clay	(Australia) Todd Woodbridge	(Netherlands) Paul Haarhuis (Australia) Sandon Stolle	7–6, 6–4
Win	65.	Jun 2000	London/Queen's Club, UK	Grass	(Australia) Todd Woodbridge	(United States) Jonathan Stark (Philippines) Eric Taino	7–6, 6–4
Win	66.	Jul 2000	Wimbledon, UK	Grass	(Australia) Todd Woodbridge	(Netherlands) Paul Haarhuis (Australia) Sandon Stolle	6–3, 6–4, 6–1
Win	67.	Aug 2000	Cincinnati, U.S.	Hard	(Australia) Todd Woodbridge	(South Africa) Ellis Ferreira (United States) Rick Leach	7–6, 6–4
Loss	24.	Oct 2000	Summer Olympics, Sydney	Hard	(Australia) Todd Woodbridge	(Canada) Sébastien Lareau (Canada) Daniel Nestor	7–5, 3–6, 4–6, 6–7

=== Singles (4 titles, 5 runner-ups) ===
Result	W/L	Date	Tournament	Surface	Opponent	Score
Win	1–0	Jan 1986	Auckland, New Zealand	Hard	(United States) Bud Schultz	6–4, 6–3, 3–6, 6–4
Win	2–0	Jan 1988	Adelaide, Australia	Hard	(Australia) Wally Masur	6–2, 6–4
Win	3–0	Jan 1989	Adelaide, Australia	Hard	(West Germany) Patrik Kühnen	7–5, 1–6, 7–5
Loss	3–1	Oct 1989	Brisbane, Australia	Hard	(Sweden) Niclas Kroon	6–4, 2–6, 4–6
Loss	3–2	Aug 1992	Los Angeles, U.S.	Hard	(Netherlands) Richard Krajicek	4–6, 6–2, 4–6
Loss	3–3	Nov 1992	Antwerp, Belgium	Carpet (i)	(Netherlands) Richard Krajicek	2–6, 2–6
Win	4–3	Feb 1993	Philadelphia, U.S.	Carpet (i)	(Czech Republic) Ivan Lendl	5–4 ret.
Loss	4–4	Aug 1994	Los Angeles, U.S.	Hard	(Germany) Boris Becker	2–6, 2–6
Loss	4–5	Oct 1998	Singapore	Carpet (i)	(Chile) Marcelo Ríos	4–6, 2–6

== Doubles performance timeline ==
Key
W	F	SF	QF	#R	RR	Q#	DNQ	A	NH

(W) winner; (F) finalist; (SF) semifinalist; (QF) quarterfinalist; (#R) rounds 4, 3, 2, 1; (RR) round-robin stage; (Q#) qualification round; (DNQ) did not qualify; (A) absent; (NH) not held; (SR) strike rate (events won / competed); (W–L) win–loss record.

Tournament	1984	1985	1986	1987	1988	1989	1990	1991	1992	1993	1994	1995	1996	1997	1998	1999	2000	SR	W–L
Grand Slam tournaments
Australian Open	1R	1R	NH	1R	2R	SF	2R	SF	W	1R	QF	3R	1R	W	F	SF	SF	2 / 16	40–14
French Open	A	A	2R	2R	SF	3R	A	3R	3R	SF	QF	1R	SF	F	3R	1R	W	1 / 14	36–13
Wimbledon	A	A	3R	QF	QF	2R	A	QF	SF	W	W	W	W	W	F	QF	W	6 / 14	59–8
US Open	A	A	A	1R	2R	W	1R	SF	SF	3R	F	W	W	1R	3R	QF	2R	3 / 14	39–11
SR	0 / 1	0 / 1	0 / 2	0 / 4	0 / 4	1 / 4	0 / 2	0 / 4	1 / 4	1 / 4	1 / 4	2 / 4	2 / 4	2 / 4	0 / 4	0 / 4	2 / 4	12 / 58	N/A
Win–loss	0–1	0–1	3–2	4–4	9–4	13–3	1–2	13–4	16–3	12–3	16–3	14–2	16–2	17–2	14–4	9–4	17–2	N/A	174–46
Year-end championships
Tennis Masters Cup	A	A	A	A	A	A	A	SF	W	F	F	SF	W	RR	RR	SF	A	2 / 9	25–13
ATP Masters Series
Indian Wells	Not Masters Series Events Before 1990						A	A	QF	A	QF	SF	W	SF	2R	2R	QF	1 / 8	11–7
Miami	Not Masters Series Events Before 1990						A	A	A	A	3R	W	W	W	2R	3R	W	4 / 7	17–3
Monte Carlo	Not Masters Series Events Before 1990						A	2R	A	A	2R	2R	A	A	F	2R	A	0 / 5	5–5
Rome	Not Masters Series Events Before 1990						A	1R	1R	A	A	A	A	1R	1R	A	2R	0 / 5	1–5
Hamburg	Not Masters Series Events Before 1990						A	1R	A	A	A	A	A	A	A	A	W	1 / 2	5–1
Canada	Not Masters Series Events Before 1990						2R	SF	A	A	A	A	QF	A	A	1R	A	0 / 4	5–4
Cincinnati	Not Masters Series Events Before 1990						1R	1R	W	1R	SF	W	QF	W	QF	F	W	4 / 11	25–7
Stuttgart (Stockholm)	Not Masters Series Events Before 1990						A	A	W	W	W	SF	QF	W	QF	SF	1R	4 / 9	20–5
Paris	Not Masters Series Events Before 1990						A	QF	2R	QF	SF	SF	SF	2R	QF	QF	A	0 / 9	10–9
SR	N/A						0 / 2	0 / 6	2 / 5	1 / 3	1 / 6	2 / 6	2 / 6	3 / 6	0 / 7	0 / 7	3 / 6	14 / 60	N/A
Win–loss	N/A						1–2	5–6	9–3	5–2	10–5	13–4	14–4	15–3	6–7	8–7	18–3	N/A	99–46
Year-end ranking	193	141	140	53	18	6	118	11	1	8	3	2	1	2	6	11	1		
