= 1984 US Open (tennis) =

- Date: August 28 – September 9
- Edition: 104th
- Category: Grand Slam (ITF)
- Surface: Hardcourt
- Location: New York City, New York, United States

Champions

Men's singles
- (United States) John McEnroe

Women's singles
- (United States) Martina Navratilova

Men's doubles
- (Australia) John Fitzgerald / (Czechoslovakia) Tomáš Šmíd

Women's doubles
- (United States) Martina Navratilova / (United States) Pam Shriver

Mixed doubles
- (Bulgaria) Manuela Maleeva / (United States) Tom Gullikson

Boys' singles
- (Australia) Mark Kratzmann

Girls' singles
- (Bulgaria) Katerina Maleeva

Boys' doubles
- (Mexico) Leonardo Lavalle / (Romania) Mihnea-Ion Năstase

Girls' doubles
- (Argentina) Mercedes Paz / (Argentina) Gabriela Sabatini
- US Open

The 1984 US Open was a tennis tournament played on outdoor hard courts at the USTA National Tennis Center in New York City in New York in the United States. It was the 104th edition of the US Open and was held from August 28 to September 9, 1984.

== Seniors ==
=== Men's singles ===
(United States) John McEnroe defeated (Czechoslovakia) Ivan Lendl 6–3, 6–4, 6–1

- It was McEnroe's fourth US Open title and the last Grand Slam title.

=== Women's singles ===
(United States) Martina Navratilova defeated (United States) Chris Evert-Lloyd 4–6, 6–4, 6–4

- It was Navratilova's 18th career Grand Slam title and her 4th US Open title.

=== Men's doubles ===
(Australia) John Fitzgerald / (Czechoslovakia) Tomáš Šmíd defeated (Sweden) Stefan Edberg / (Sweden) Anders Järryd 7–6^{(7–5)}, 6–3, 6–3

- It was Fitzgerald's 3rd career Grand Slam title and his 2nd US Open title. It was Šmíd's 1st career Grand Slam title and his only US Open title.

=== Women's doubles ===
(United States) Martina Navratilova / (United States) Pam Shriver defeated (United Kingdom) Anne Hobbs / (Australia) Wendy Turnbull 6–2, 6–4

- It was Navratilova's 29th career Grand Slam title and her 7th US Open title. It was Shriver's 9th career Grand Slam title and her 2nd US Open title.

=== Mixed doubles ===
(Bulgaria) Manuela Maleeva / (United States) Tom Gullikson defeated (Australia) Elizabeth Sayers / (Australia) John Fitzgerald 2–6, 7–5, 6–4

- It was Maleeva's only career Grand Slam title. It was Gullikson's only career Grand Slam title.

== Juniors ==
=== Boys' singles ===
(Australia) Mark Kratzmann defeated (West Germany) Boris Becker 6–3, 7–6

=== Girls' singles ===
(Bulgaria) Katerina Maleeva defeated (United States) Niurka Sodupe 6–1, 6–2

=== Boys' doubles ===
(Mexico) Leonardo Lavalle / (Romania) Mihnea-Ion Năstase defeated (Mexico) Agustín Moreno / (Peru) Jaime Yzaga 7–6, 1–6, 6–1

=== Girls' doubles ===
(Argentina) Mercedes Paz / (Argentina) Gabriela Sabatini defeated (United States) Stephanie London / (United States) Cammy MacGregor 6–4, 3–6, 6–2

== "Super Saturday" ==
September 8, 1984, is generally considered the single greatest day in tennis history. Each of the four matches played at Louis Armstrong Stadium, the tournament's Center Court at the time, went the maximum number of sets. All eight players would win at least one Grand Slam title, seven were eventually inducted into the International Tennis Hall of Fame. From the opening serve of the first contest at 11:07 am (ET) to match point of the final one at 11:16 pm, there were 16 sets, 165 games and 979 points.

The day opened with an over-35 men's singles semifinal match won by Stan Smith over John Newcombe. In the first of two men's singles semifinal contests, Ivan Lendl advanced to his third consecutive US Open final after outlasting Pat Cash 3–6, 6–3, 6–4, 6–7 (5–7), 7–6 (7–4). The last two matches involved rivalries. Martina Navratilova captured the second of her four US Open women's singles championships by defeating Chris Evert 4–6, 6–4, 6–4. The other men's singles semifinal between John McEnroe and Jimmy Connors didn't begin until 7:28 pm. McEnroe survived a nighttime thriller 6–4, 4–6, 7–5, 4–6, 6–3, en route to what would be the last singles Grand Slam title of his career (subsequently adding to his men's doubles titles at the US Open in 1989 and Wimbledon in 1992).

The lengthy day at Center Court was made possible by CBS which was televising the tournament. Not wanting a recurrence of what happened the previous year when three quick contests forced a scramble to fill the remaining allocated time, the network had requested the addition of the Smith-Newcombe match to lead off the program. The broadcast established what was then the longest continuous coverage of a sporting event in American television history.

Tennis fans who were present at Armstrong Stadium to enjoy all the contests that day were able to do so on a single admission. When both Serena and Venus Williams made the tournament finals together for the first time in 2001, organizers switched the women's singles championship match to prime time to attract more television viewers. In the process, they also began charging separate admission for each of the two sessions on the last Saturday of the fortnight.

Preceded by 1984 Wimbledon Championships	Grand Slams	Succeeded by 1984 Australian Open
