= Jeff Klaparda =

American tennis player

- Full name: Jeff Klaparda
- Country (sports): United States
- Born: November 7, 1963 (age 61); Los Angeles, California
- Turned pro: 1986
- Plays: Right-handed

Singles
- Career record: 5–9
- Career titles: 0
- Highest ranking: No. 153 (July 13, 1987)

Grand Slam singles results
- US Open: 2R (1984)

Doubles
- Career record: 15–23
- Career titles: 1
- Highest ranking: No. 59 (August 31, 1987)

Grand Slam doubles results
- Australian Open: 1R (1989)
- Wimbledon: 3R (1987)
- US Open: 2R (1987)
Medal record
Maccabiah Games
Gold medal – first place	1981 Tel Aviv	Mixed doubles

Jeff Klaparda (born November 7, 1963) is a former professional tennis player from the United States.

== Biography ==
Klaparda, who is Jewish, won a gold medal at the 1981 Maccabiah Games in Israel, in the mixed doubles with Andrea Leand.

He went to UCLA in the early 1980s and was an All-American player on the tennis team. In the 1984 NCAA Division I Tennis Championships he was captain of the UCLA side that won the Championship and he also made the semi-finals of the singles. He won the 1984 USTA National Amateur Clay Courts title.

At a Grand Prix tournament in Cleveland in 1984, Klaparda had an upset win over top 20 player Bill Scanlon, before exiting in the semi-finals. Soon after he qualified for the main draw in the 1984 US Open and beat countryman John Hayes in the first round, then lost a four-set second round match to eight seed Aaron Krickstein. It was his only Grand Slam appearances in singles but he competed in several doubles draws with a best performance coming at the 1987 Wimbledon Championships, when he and partner Lloyd Bourne had a win over the sixth seeds Peter Fleming and Gary Donnelly, en route to the third round. It was with Bourne that he won his only Grand Prix title, the doubles at the 1987 Rye Brook Open.

== Grand Prix career finals ==
=== Doubles: 1 (1–0) ===
Result	W/L	Date	Tournament	Surface	Partner	Opponents	Score
Win	1–0	Aug 1987	Rye Brook, U. S.	Hard	(United States) Lloyd Bourne	(Australia) Carl Limberger (Australia) Mark Woodforde	6–3, 6–3

== Challenger titles ==
=== Doubles: (3) ===
No.	Year	Tournament	Surface	Partner	Opponents	Score
1.	1987	Lagos, Nigeria	Hard	(United States) Lloyd Bourne	(France) Loïc Courteau (France) Éric Winogradsky	6–7, 6–2, 7–6
2.	1988	Aptos, U. S.	Hard	(United States) Peter Palandjian	(United States) Ed Nagel (United States) Jeff Tarango	6–3, 6–4
3.	1988	New Haven, U. S.	Hard	(United States) Peter Palandjian	(India) Zeeshan Ali (United Kingdom) Chris Bailey	6–2, 7–5

== See also ==
- List of select Jewish tennis players
