= John Ross (tennis) =

American tennis player

- Country (sports): United States
- Residence: Gainesville, Florida
- Born: February 29, 1964 (age 61); San Diego, California
- Height: 6 ft 1 in (1.85 m)
- Retired: 1991
- Plays: Right-handed
- Prize money: $156,098

Singles
- Career record: 24–49
- Career titles: 0
- Highest ranking: No. 92 (January 4, 1988)

Grand Slam singles results
- Australian Open: 1R (1988)
- French Open: 1R (1988)
- Wimbledon: 2R (1988)
- US Open: 2R (1988)

Doubles
- Career record: 23–46
- Career titles: 0
- Highest ranking: No. 172 (May 2, 1988)

Grand Slam doubles results
- Australian Open: 2R (1988)
- French Open: 1R (1988)
- Wimbledon: 1R (1988)
- US Open: 2R (1981, 1987)

John Ross (born February 29, 1964) is a former professional tennis player from the United States.

== Career ==
Ross was a runner-up in the boys' doubles at the 1982 Wimbledon Championships, where he and partner Rick Leach lost in the final to Pat Cash and John Frawley. He also competed in the boys' singles, reaching the quarter-finals.

He played collegiate tennis at Southern Methodist University and was an All-American in 1984, 1985 and 1986.

His best performance on the Grand Prix tour came in 1987, when he was the singles runner-up, to Peter Lundgren, at Rye Brook. En route he defeated top 100 players Jaime Yzaga and Thomas Muster. Later that year he had a win over world number 19 Slobodan Živojinović in Hong Kong. In 1988, he got within two points of upsetting Stefan Edberg at Forest Hills.

Ross made the second round of the Wimbledon Championships and the US Open in 1988. In the second round of the US Open, he took 12th seed Guillermo Pérez Roldán to five sets.

He retired from professional tennis in 1991, to study at Harvard Business School.

== Grand Prix career finals ==
=== Singles: 1 (0–1) ===
Result	W/L	Date	Tournament	Surface	Opponent	Score
Loss	0–1	Aug 1987	Rye Brook, United States	Hard	(Sweden) Peter Lundgren	7–6, 5–7, 3–6

== Challenger titles ==
=== Doubles: (1) ===
No.	Year	Tournament	Surface	Partner	Opponents	Score
1.	1986	West Palm Beach, United States	Clay	(United States) Derek Tarr	(United States) Ricky Brown (United States) Tim Siegel	4–6, 6–4, 6–4
