= Lloyd Bourne =

American tennis player

- Country (sports): United States
- Born: October 18, 1958 (age 66); Los Angeles, California
- Height: 6 ft 3 in (191 cm)
- Plays: Right-handed
- Prize money: $295,736

Singles
- Career record: 67–91
- Highest ranking: No. 71 (October 25, 1982)

Grand Slam singles results
- Australian Open: 4R (1984)
- French Open: 2R (1982)
- Wimbledon: 3R (1982)
- US Open: 2R (1983, 1985, 1987)

Doubles
- Career record: 63–93
- Career titles: 1
- Highest ranking: No. 42 (September 14, 1987)

Grand Slam doubles results
- Australian Open: QF (1983, 1984)
- French Open: 2R (1982)
- Wimbledon: 3R (1987)
- US Open: QF (1981)

Lloyd Bourne (born October 18, 1958) is a former professional tennis player from the United States. Bourne attended St. Francis High School in La Canada, California, transferring to Blair High in Pasadena as a senior. He played for Stanford in college on its NCAA Championship team in 1981.

During his career, Bourne won one doubles titles. He achieved a career-high singles ranking of world No. 71 in 1982 and a career-high doubles ranking of World No. 42 in 1987.

== Grand Prix Tour finals ==
=== Singles (2 losses) ===
| Result | W/L | Date | Tournament | Surface | Opponent | Score |
|---|---|---|---|---|---|---|
| Loss | 0–1 | 1982 | Adelaide-2, Australia | Grass | (Australia) Rod Frawley | 6–2, 3–6, 2–6 |
| Loss | 0–2 | 1982 | Cap d'Agde WCT, France | Clay | (Czechoslovakia) Tomáš Šmíd | 3–6, 4–6, 7–5, 2–6 |

=== Doubles (1 win, 1 loss) ===
| Result | W/L | Date | Tournament | Surface | Partner | Opponents | Score |
|---|---|---|---|---|---|---|---|
| Loss | 0–1 | 1981 | Bangkok, Thailand | Carpet | (United States) Van Winitsky | (United States) John Austin (United States) Mike Cahill | 3–6, 6–7 |
| Win | 1–1 | 1987 | Rye Brook, U.S. | Hard | (United States) Jeff Klaparda | (Australia) Carl Limberger (Australia) Mark Woodforde | 6–3, 6–3 |
