= 1983 US Open – Women's singles qualifying =

Women's singles qualifying
- 1983 US Open

Events
Singles	men	women		boys	girls
Doubles	men	women	mixed	boys	girls
WC Singles	men	women	quad
WC Doubles	men	women	quad
Legends	men	women	mixed

Qualification
Singles	men	women
- US Open

Players who neither had high enough rankings nor received wild cards to enter the main draw of the annual US Open Tennis Championships participated in a qualifying tournament held over several days before the event.

Barbie Bramblett won her match after being 6–0, 5-0 40-0 down and saved 18 match points in total against Ann Hulbert. Previously in the same year, she saved 20 match points to win another match.

== Seeds ==
1. (Austria) Petra Huber (qualified)
2. (West Germany) Steffi Graf (first round)
3. (United States) Barbie Bramblett (qualified)
4. (United Kingdom) Amanda Brown (first round)
5. (Czechoslovakia) Yvona Brzáková (first round)
6. (Italy) Barbara Rossi (first round)
7. (Australia) Chris O'Neil (second round)
8. (France) Marie-Christine Calleja (qualified)
9. (United States) Felicia Raschiatore (first round)
10. (France) Sophie Amiach (first round)
11. (South Africa) Rene Uys (qualifying competition, lucky loser)
12. (United States) Trey Lewis (first round)
13. (United States) Phyllis Blackwell (qualifying competition, lucky loser)
14. (Australia) Pam Whytcross (first round)
15. (France) Nathalie Herreman (second round)

== Qualifiers ==
1. (Austria) Petra Huber
2. (Soviet Union) Larisa Neiland
3. (United Kingdom) Shelley Walpole
4. (United States) Grace Kim
5. (United Kingdom) Annabel Croft
6. (United States) Barbie Bramblett
7. (France) Marie-Christine Calleja
8. (United States) Laura Bernstein

== Lucky losers ==
1. (United States) Phyllis Blackwell
2. (South Africa) Rene Uys
3. (United States) Jane Forman

== Qualifying draw ==
Key

- Q = Qualifier
- WC = Wild card
- LL = Lucky loser
- Alt = Alternate
- ITF = ITF entry
- PR = Protected ranking
- SR = Special ranking
- SE = Special exempt
- JE = Junior exempt
- JR = Junior Accelerator Programme entrant
- CO = College Accelerator Programme entrant
- NG = Next Gen Accelerator Program entrant
- w/o = Walkover
- r = Retired
- d = Defaulted

=== First qualifier ===
First round
1	(Austria) Petra Huber	1	6	7
(United Kingdom) Elizabeth Jones	6	2	5
(United States) Marianne Werdel	6	6
(Australia) Bernadette Randall	3	2
(West Germany) Myriam Schropp	6	6
(Italy) Lara De Angelis	1	0
(United States) Michaela Washington	3	1
15	(France) Nathalie Herreman	6	6

Second round
1	(Austria) Petra Huber	6	6
(United States) Marianne Werdel	0	3
(West Germany) Myriam Schropp	4	6	7
15	(France) Nathalie Herreman	6	4	6

Qualifying competition
1	(Austria) Petra Huber	6	7
(West Germany) Myriam Schropp	3	6

=== Second qualifier ===
First round
7	(Australia) Chris O'Neil	6	4	6
(United States) Eileen Tell	2	6	1
(United States) Jane Forman	6	2	7
(United States) Kathy O'Brien	4	6	5
(United States) Robin White	3	4
(Soviet Union) Larisa Neiland	6	6
(United Kingdom) Sara Gomer	6	6	6
9	(United States) Felicia Raschiatore	3	7	1

Second round
7	(Australia) Chris O'Neil	4	4
(United States) Jane Forman	6	6
(Soviet Union) Larisa Neiland	6	5	6
(United Kingdom) Sara Gomer	1	7	1

Qualifying competition
(United States) Jane Forman	5	6
(Soviet Union) Larisa Neiland	7	7

=== Third qualifier ===
First round
4	(United Kingdom) Amanda Brown	2	1
(United Kingdom) Shelley Walpole	6	6
(United Kingdom) Rina Einy	6	6
(Poland) Iwona Kuczyńska	2	1
(United States) Maeve Quinlan	6	6
(United States) Heather Crowe	1	0
(Australia) Nerida Gregory	7	7
14	(Australia) Pam Whytcross	6	5

Second round
(United Kingdom) Shelley Walpole	6	6
(United Kingdom) Rina Einy	2	4
(United States) Maeve Quinlan	4	6
(Australia) Nerida Gregory	6	7

Qualifying competition
(United Kingdom) Shelley Walpole	3	6	7
(Australia) Nerida Gregory	6	3	5

=== Fourth qualifier ===
First round
12	(United States) Trey Lewis	3	3
(Sweden) Carina Karlsson	6	6
(United States) Joy Cummings	2	6	2
(United States) Kris Kinney	6	4	6
(United States) June Ferestien	4	6	6
(United States) Linda Gates	6	3	0
(United States) Grace Kim	6	6
6	(Italy) Barbara Rossi	1	4

Second round
(Sweden) Carina Karlsson	7	6
(United States) Kris Kinney	6	4
(United States) June Ferestien	1	1
(United States) Grace Kim	6	6

Qualifying competition
(Sweden) Carina Karlsson	3	2
(United States) Grace Kim	6	6

=== Fifth qualifier ===
First round
5	(Czechoslovakia) Yvona Brzáková	2	3
(United Kingdom) Annabel Croft	6	6
(United States) Helena Konanz	5	5
(United States) Shawn Foltz	7	7
(United States) Jamie Golder	6	6
(United Kingdom) Cathy Drury	3	2
(United States) Stacy Margolin	6	5	5
11	(South Africa) Rene Uys	4	7	7

Second round
(United Kingdom) Annabel Croft	6	6
(United States) Shawn Foltz	1	3
(United States) Jamie Golder	4	4
11	(South Africa) Rene Uys	6	6

Qualifying competition
(United Kingdom) Annabel Croft	7	6
11	(South Africa) Rene Uys	5	2

=== Sixth qualifier ===
First round
13	(United States) Phyllis Blackwell	6	6
(Canada) Angela Walker	3	1
(West Germany) Petra Keppeler	2	7	6
(Canada) Karen Dewis	6	5	1
(United States) Ann Hulbert	1	6	7
(United States) Jennifer Prah	6	2	5
(Japan) Masako Yanagi	4	2
3	(United States) Barbie Bramblett	6	6

Second round
13	(United States) Phyllis Blackwell	6	2	7
(West Germany) Petra Keppeler	3	6	5
(United States) Ann Hulbert	6	5	3
3	(United States) Barbie Bramblett	0	7	6

Qualifying competition
13	(United States) Phyllis Blackwell	3	5
3	(United States) Barbie Bramblett	6	7

=== Seventh qualifier ===
First round
10	(France) Sophie Amiach	4	4
(United States) Susan Rimes	6	6
(United States) Lori McNeil	3	6	6
(United States) Debbie Spence	6	2	4
(Soviet Union) Svetlana Parkhomenko	6	6
(United States) Micki Schillig	0	2
(United States) Lisa Spain	4	3
8	(France) Marie-Christine Calleja	6	6

Second round
(United States) Susan Rimes	3	2
(United States) Lori McNeil	6	6
(Soviet Union) Svetlana Parkhomenko	0	6	2
8	(France) Marie-Christine Calleja	6	2	6

Qualifying competition
(United States) Lori McNeil	2	2
8	(France) Marie-Christine Calleja	6	6

=== Eighth qualifier ===
First round
Alt	(United States) Betsy Heidenberger	6	7	3
(United States) Laura Bernstein	7	5	6
(United Kingdom) Julie Salmon	1	2
(Australia) Brenda Remilton-Ward	6	6
(United States) Cecilia Fernandez-Parker	2	6	4
(China) Hu Na	6	0	6
(United States) Melissa Brown	6	6
2	(West Germany) Steffi Graf	1	2

Second round
(United States) Laura Bernstein	6	6
(Australia) Brenda Remilton-Ward	4	4
(China) Hu Na	3	4
(United States) Melissa Brown	6	6

Qualifying competition
(United States) Laura Bernstein	2	6	6
(United States) Melissa Brown	6	4	1
