= 1983 in tennis =

This page covers all the important events in the sport of tennis in 1983. It provides the results of notable tournaments throughout the year on both the men's and the women's tennis circuits, the Davis Cup, and the Federation Cup.

== Australian Open ==
Category	Champion(s)	Finalist(s)	Score
Men's singles	(Sweden) Mats Wilander	(Czechoslovakia) Ivan Lendl	6–1, 6–4, 6–4 (Note: It was Wilander's 2nd career Grand Slam singles title and his 1st title at the Australian Open.)
Women's singles	(United States) Martina Navratilova	(United States) Kathy Jordan	6–2, 7–6^{(7–5)} (Note: It was Navratilova's 8th career Grand Slam singles title and her 2nd title at the Australian Open.)
Men's doubles	(Australia) Mark Edmondson (Australia) Paul McNamee	(United States) Steve Denton (United States) Sherwood Stewart	6–3, 7–6 (Note: It was Edmondson's 4th career Grand Slam title and his 4th Australian Open title. It was McNamee's 4th and last career Grand Slam title and his 2nd Australian Open title.)
Women's doubles	(United States) Martina Navratilova (United States) Pam Shriver	(United Kingdom) Anne Hobbs (Australia) Wendy Turnbull	6–4, 6–7, 6–2 (Note: It was Navratilova's 23rd career Grand Slam title and her 5th Australian Open title. It was Shriver's 6th career Grand Slam title and her 2nd Australian Open title.)
Mixed doubles	The competition was not held between 1970 and 1986.		

== French Open ==
Category	Champion(s)	Finalist(s)	Score
Men's singles	(France) Yannick Noah	(Sweden) Mats Wilander	6–2, 7–5, 7–6^{(7–3)} (Note: It was Noah's 3rd title of the year, and his 14th overall. It was his 1st (and only) career Grand Slam title.)
Women's singles	(United States) Chris Evert	(Socialist Federal Republic of Yugoslavia) Mima Jaušovec	6–1, 6–2 (Note: It was Evert's 15th career Grand Slam title, and her 5th French Open title.)
Men's doubles	(Sweden) Anders Järryd (Sweden) Hans Simonsson	(Australia) Mark Edmondson (United States) Sherwood Stewart	7–6^{(7–4)}, 6–4, 6–2
Women's doubles	(South Africa) Rosalyn Fairbank (United States) Candy Reynolds	(United States) Kathy Jordan (United States) Anne Smith	5–7, 7–5, 6–2
Mixed doubles	(United States) Barbara Jordan (United States) Eliot Teltscher	(United States) Leslie Allen (United States) Charles Strode	6–2, 6–3

== Wimbledon ==
Category	Champion(s)	Finalist(s)	Score
Men's singles	(United States) John McEnroe	(New Zealand) Chris Lewis	6–2, 6–2, 6–2 (Note: It was McEnroe's 5th career Grand Slam title and his 2nd Wimbledon title.)
Women's singles	(United States) Martina Navratilova	(United States) Andrea Jaeger	6–0, 6–3 (Note: It was Navratilova's 18th career Grand Slam title and her 4th Wimbledon single's title.)
Men's doubles	(United States) Peter Fleming (United States) John McEnroe	(United States) Tim Gullikson (United States) Tom Gullikson	6–4, 6–3, 6–4 (Note: It was Fleming's 5th career Grand Slam title and his 3rd Wimbledon title. It was McEnroe's 11th career Grand Slam title and his 5th Wimbledon title.)
Women's doubles	(United States) Martina Navratilova (United States) Pam Shriver	(United States) Rosie Casals (Australia) Wendy Turnbull	6–2, 6–2 (Note: It was Navratilova's 19th career Grand Slam title and her 9th Wimbledon title. It was Shriver's 4th career Grand Slam title and her 3rd Wimbledon title.)
Mixed doubles	(United Kingdom) John Lloyd (Australia) Wendy Turnbull	(United States) Steve Denton (United States) Billie Jean King	6–7^{(5–7)}, 7–6^{(7–5)}, 7–5 (Note: It was Lloyd's 2nd career Grand Slam title and his 1st Wimbledon title. It was Turnbull's 8th career Grand Slam title and her 2nd Wimbledon title.)

== US Open ==
Category	Champion(s)	Finalist(s)	Score
Men's singles	(United States) Jimmy Connors	(Czechoslovakia) Ivan Lendl	6–3, 6–7^{(2–7)}, 7–5, 6–0 (Note: It was Connors's 8th and last career Grand Slam title, his 5th US Open title and his 100th ATP single title.)
Women's singles	(United States) Martina Navratilova	(United States) Chris Evert	6–1, 6–3 (Note: It was Navratilova's 20th career Grand Slam title and her 1st US Open title.)
Men's doubles	(United States) Peter Fleming (United States) John McEnroe	(United States) Fritz Buehning (United States) Van Winitsky	6–3, 6–4, 6–2 (Note: It was Fleming's 6th career Grand Slam title and his 3rd and last US Open title. It was McEnroe's 12th career Grand Slam title and his 6th US Open title.)
Women's doubles	(United States) Martina Navratilova (United States) Pam Shriver	(South Africa) Rosalyn Fairbank (United States) Candy Reynolds	6–7^{(4–7)}, 6–1, 6–3 (Note: It was Navratilova's 21st career Grand Slam title and her 5th US Open title. It was Shriver's 5th career Grand Slam title and her 1st US Open title.)
Mixed doubles	(Australia) Elizabeth Sayers (Australia) John Fitzgerald	(United States) Barbara Potter (United States) Ferdi Taygan	3–6, 6–3, 6–4 (Note: It was Sayers' 1st career Grand Slam title and her 1st US Open title. It was Fitzgerald's 2nd career Grand Slam title and his 1st US Open title.)

== Davis Cup ==
First round 4–6 March
Moscow, Soviet Union (indoor carpet)
France	4
Soviet Union	1
Asunción, Paraguay (indoor carpet)
Czechoslovakia	2
Paraguay	3
Adelaide, Australia (grass)
Australia	4
Great Britain	1
Timișoara, Romania (indoor hard)
Chile	0
Romania	5
Bjärred, Sweden (indoor carpet)
Indonesia	0
Sweden	5
Christchurch, New Zealand (grass)
Denmark	0
New Zealand	5
Reggio Calabria, Italy (clay)
Ireland	2
Italy	3
Buenos Aires, Argentina (clay)
Argentina	3
United States	2

Quarterfinals; 8–10 July
Marseille, France (clay)
France	3
Paraguay	2
Brisbane, Australia (grass)
Australia	5
Romania	0
Eastbourne, United Kingdom (grass)
Sweden	3
New Zealand	2
Rome, Italy (clay)
Italy	0
Argentina	5

Semifinals; 30 September–2 October
Sydney, Australia (grass)
France	1
Australia	4
Stockholm, Sweden (indoor carpet)
Sweden	4
Argentina	1

Final; 26–28 December
Melbourne, Australia (grass)
Australia	3
Sweden	2

== Federation Cup ==
First Round
United States	3
Q	Norway	0
Sweden	3
Belgium	0
Yugoslavia	2
Q	South Korea	1
Q	China	2
Netherlands	1
France	1
Argentina	2
Q	Zimbabwe	0
Hungary	3
Italy	2
Austria	1
Peru	0
Czechoslovakia	3
Australia	3
Soviet Union	0
Greece	1
Q	Mexico	2
Romania	3
Canada	0
Bulgaria	0
Switzerland	3
Great Britain	3
Luxembourg	0
Q	Israel	1
Brazil	2
Japan	2
Q	Denmark	1
Spain	0
West Germany	3

Second Round
United States	3
Sweden	0
Yugoslavia	3
Q	China	0
Argentina	3
Hungary	0
Italy	1
Czechoslovakia	2
Australia	3
Q	Mexico	0
Romania	1
Switzerland	2
Great Britain	3
Brazil	0
Japan	0
West Germany	3

Quarterfinals
United States	2
Yugoslavia	1
Argentina	0
Czechoslovakia	2
Australia	1
Switzerland	2
Great Britain	1
West Germany	2

Semifinals
United States	0
Czechoslovakia	2
Switzerland	0
West Germany	3

Final
Czechoslovakia	2
West Germany	1
