= 1984 Benson and Hedges Open – Singles =

Singles
- 1984 Benson and Hedges Open

Final
- Champion: (United States) Danny Saltz
- Runner-up: (United States) Chip Hooper
- Score: 4–6, 6–3, 6–4, 6–4

Details
- Draw: 32 (4 Q )
- Seeds: 8

Events
Singles	Doubles
← 1983 ·	ATP Auckland Open	· 1985 →

Danny Saltz defeated Chip Hooper 4–6, 6–3, 6–4, 6–4 to win the 1984 Heineken Open singles competition. John Alexander was the defending champion.

== Seeds ==
A champion seed is indicated in bold text while text in italics indicates the round in which that seed was eliminated.

1. (New Zealand) Chris Lewis (quarterfinals)
2. (United States) Chip Hooper (final)
3. (Australia) Wally Masur (second round)
4. (Australia) John Alexander (quarterfinals)
5. (Australia) Brad Drewett (semifinals)
6. (New Zealand) Russell Simpson (quarterfinals)
7. (United States) Larry Stefanki (semifinals)
8. (United States) Lloyd Bourne (second round)

== Draw ==
=== Key ===
- Q – Qualifier
- WO – Walkover
- NB: The Final was the best of 5 sets while all other rounds were the best of 3 sets.

=== Final ===
Final
Q	(United States) **Danny Saltz**	4	**6**	**6**	**6**
2	(United States) Chip Hooper	**6**	3	4	4

=== Section 1 ===
First round
1	(New Zealand) **C Lewis**	**6**	6	**6**
(Australia) P Doohan	3	**7**	1
(Australia) **J Frawley**	**7**	**6**
(New Zealand) D Mustard	6	2
(France) J Vanier	6	**6**	4
(India) **V Amritraj**	**7**	4	**6**
(United States) M Brunnberg	1	4
5	(Australia) **B Drewett**	**6**	**6**
3	(Australia) **W Masur**	4	**6**	**6**
(New Zealand) B Derlin	**6**	3	3
(United States) J Austin	6	3
Q	(New Zealand) **S Guy**	**7**	**6**
Q	(United States) **D Saltz**	**6**	3	**6**
(United Kingdom) J Smith	1	**6**	4
(United States) R Evett	**6**	1	4
8	(United States) **L Bourne**	3	**6**	**6**

Second round
1	(New Zealand) **C Lewis**	3	**7**	**8**
(Australia) J Frawley	**6**	6	6
(India) V Amritraj	6	**6**	1
5	(Australia) **B Drewett**	**7**	4	**6**
3	(Australia) W Masur	3	6
Q	(New Zealand) **S Guy**	**6**	**7**
Q	(United States) **D Saltz**	**6**	**7**
8	(United States) L Bourne	2	5

Quarterfinals
1	(New Zealand) C Lewis
5	(Australia) **B Drewett**	WO
Q	(New Zealand) S Guy	**6**	5	4
Q	(United States) **D Saltz**	3	**7**	**6**

Semifinals
5	(Australia) B Drewett	6	6
Q	(United States) **D Saltz**	**7**	**7**

=== Section 2 ===
First round
7	(United States) **L Stefanki**	**7**	**6**
(Australia) R Frawley	6	1
(United States) **T Nelson**	**6**	**7**
(Australia) S Youl	3	6
(New Zealand) D Lewis	3	2
(United States) **S Brawley**	**6**	**6**
(United States) L Shiras	6	6
4	(Australia) **J Alexander**	**7**	**7**
6	(New Zealand) **R Simpson**	3	**6**	**6**
(Australia) B Dyke	**6**	3	4
(Australia) **P Johnston**	**6**	**6**
(United Kingdom) J Bates	2	2
Q	(New Zealand) M Lewis	1	**6**	4
Q	(United States) **B Maze**	**6**	1	**6**
(Australia) C Miller	4	6
2	(United States) **C Hooper**	**6**	**7**

Second round
7	(United States) **L Stefanki**	**6**	**6**
(United States) T Nelson	3	4
(United States) S Brawley	**7**	2	4
4	(Australia) **J Alexander**	6	**6**	**6**
6	(New Zealand) **R Simpson**	**7**	4	**6**
(Australia) P Johnston	6	**6**	1
Q	(United States) B Maze	3	3
2	(United States) **C Hooper**	**6**	**6**

Quarterfinals
7	(United States) **L Stefanki**	5	**6**	**6**
4	(Australia) J Alexander	**7**	4	2
6	(New Zealand) R Simpson	2	**6**	4
2	(United States) **C Hooper**	**6**	2	**6**

Semifinals
7	(United States) L Stefanki	4	3
2	(United States) **C Hooper**	**6**	**6**
