= 1982 US Open – Women's singles qualifying =

Women's singles qualifying
- 1982 US Open

Events
Singles	men	women		boys	girls
Doubles	men	women	mixed	boys	girls
WC Singles	men	women	quad
WC Doubles	men	women	quad
Legends	men	women	mixed
← 1981 ·	US Open	· 1983 →

Players who neither had high enough rankings nor received wild cards to enter the main draw of the annual US Open Tennis Championships participated in a qualifying tournament held over several days before the event.

== Seeds ==
1. (South Africa) Elizabeth Gordon (first round)
2. (Peru) Pilar Vásquez (qualifying competition, lucky loser)
3. (United States) Lisa Doherty (second round)
4. (Czechoslovakia) Kateřina Skronská (qualifying competition)
5. (United States) Tina Mochizuki (second round)
6. (United States) Phyllis Blackwell (qualifying competition)
7. (Netherlands) Yvette Flu (first round)
8. (Australia) Elizabeth Smylie (first round)
9. (United States) Susan Rimes (first round)
10. (Spain) Carmen Perea (second round)
11. (United States) Laura Bernstein (qualified)
12. (United States) Joyce Portman (first round)
13. (United States) Heather Ludloff (qualified)
14. (United Kingdom) Annabel Croft (second round)
15. (Australia) Pam Whytcross (qualified)
16. (Canada) Carling Bassett-Seguso (qualifying competition)

== Qualifiers ==
1. (France) Sophie Amiach
2. (United States) Amy Holton
3. (United Kingdom) Kate Brasher
4. (Chile) Germaine Ohaco
5. (United States) Laura Bernstein
6. (United States) Heather Ludloff
7. (United States) Jean Hepner
8. (Australia) Pam Whytcross

== Lucky losers ==
1. (Peru) Pilar Vásquez

== Qualifying draw ==
=== Key ===
- Q = Qualifier
- WC = Wild card
- LL = Lucky loser
- Alt = Alternate
- ITF = ITF entry
- PR = Protected ranking
- SR = Special ranking
- SE = Special exempt
- JE = Junior exempt
- JR = Junior Accelerator Programme entrant
- CO = College Accelerator Programme entrant
- NG = Next Gen Accelerator Program entrant
- w/o = Walkover
- r = Retired
- d = Defaulted

=== First qualifier ===
First round
1	(South Africa) Elizabeth Gordon	6	3	0
(France) Sophie Amiach	3	6	6
(United States) Julie Filkoff	6^{2}	6	6
(New Zealand) Chris Newton	7^{7}	4	1
(United States) Cissie Donigan	3	3
(Australia) Bernadette Randall	6	6
(United States) Shannon Gordon	3	1
16	(Canada) Carling Bassett-Seguso	6	6

Second round
(France) Sophie Amiach	6	6
(United States) Julie Filkoff	2	3
(Australia) Bernadette Randall	1	5
16	(Canada) Carling Bassett-Seguso	6	7

Qualifying competition
(France) Sophie Amiach	6	6
16	(Canada) Carling Bassett-Seguso	4	1

=== Second qualifier ===
First round
7	(Netherlands) Yvette Flu	2	4
(United States) Helena Konanz	6	6
(United States) Jan Blackstad	6	6
(Mexico) Lucila Becerra	4	4
(United States) Lisa Spain	1	3
(United States) Penny Barg	6	6
(United States) Amy Holton	6	6
9	(United States) Susan Rimes	4	1

Second round
(United States) Helena Konanz	6	6
(United States) Jan Blackstad	2	0
(United States) Penny Barg	5	4
(United States) Amy Holton	7	6

Qualifying competition
(United States) Helena Konanz	2	4
(United States) Amy Holton	6	6

=== Third qualifier ===
First round
3	(United States) Lisa Doherty	6	6
(Canada) Kate Glancy	1	0
(United States) Marianne Werdel	6	7^{7}
(United States) Marcie Louie	1	6^{4}
(Canada) Angela Walker	6	4	3
(United Kingdom) Kate Brasher	3	6	6
(United States) Shandra Livingston	1	5
14	(United Kingdom) Annabel Croft	6	7

Second round
3	(United States) Lisa Doherty	5	2
(United States) Marianne Werdel	7	6
(United Kingdom) Kate Brasher	6	0	6
14	(United Kingdom) Annabel Croft	3	6	3

Qualifying competition
(United States) Marianne Werdel	3	6	3
(United Kingdom) Kate Brasher	6	3	6

=== Fourth qualifier ===
First round
12	(United States) Joyce Portman	4	0
(United States) Cricket Manuel	6	6
(Poland) Iwona Kuczyńska	7^{7}	6
(United States) Carol Watson	6^{1}	4
(United States) Shelby Torrance	5	6	3
(Chile) Germaine Ohaco	7	4	6
(Hong Kong) Patricia Hy	3	0^{r}
5	(United States) Tina Mochizuki	6	3

Second round
(United States) Cricket Manuel	4	6	6
(Poland) Iwona Kuczyńska	6	1	0
(Chile) Germaine Ohaco	4	6	6
5	(United States) Tina Mochizuki	6	4	4

Qualifying competition
(United States) Cricket Manuel	4	6	5
(Chile) Germaine Ohaco	6	2	7

=== Fifth qualifier ===
First round
6	(United States) Phyllis Blackwell	6	6
(United States) Jennifer Fuchs	0	3
(United States) Terry Phelps	6	6
(United States) Marsha Bladel	0	4
(United States) Merrilee Keller	0	2
(United Kingdom) Ellinore Lightbody	6	6
(Argentina) Adriana Villagrán	6	5	5
11	(United States) Laura Bernstein	2	7	7

Second round
6	(United States) Phyllis Blackwell	6	6
(United States) Terry Phelps	4	4
(United Kingdom) Ellinore Lightbody	6	3	6^{5}
11	(United States) Laura Bernstein	4	6	7^{7}

Qualifying competition
6	(United States) Phyllis Blackwell	3	4
11	(United States) Laura Bernstein	6	6

=== Sixth qualifier ===
First round
13	(United States) Heather Ludloff	6	6
(Colombia) Elsa Rodríguez	1	4
(Japan) Naoko Sato	6	6
(Jamaica) Joni Van Ryck De Groot	3	4
(Brazil) Gláucia Langela	4	4
(United Kingdom) Amanda Brown	6	6
(Canada) Hélène Pelletier	0	4
4	(Czechoslovakia) Kateřina Skronská	6	6

Second round
13	(United States) Heather Ludloff	5	6	6
(Japan) Naoko Sato	7	4	4
(United Kingdom) Amanda Brown	2	6	3
4	(Czechoslovakia) Kateřina Skronská	6	0	6

Qualifying competition
13	(United States) Heather Ludloff	6	5	6
4	(Czechoslovakia) Kateřina Skronská	4	7	2

=== Seventh qualifier ===
First round
10	(Spain) Carmen Perea	6	7^{7}
(United States) Jane Forman	3	6^{3}
(Italy) Patrizia Murgo	6	7^{7}
(United States) Stephanie Hales	1	6^{3}
(United States) Caryn Copeland	4	2
(United States) Jean Hepner	6	6
(Sweden) Catrin Jexell	6	2	6
8	(Australia) Elizabeth Smylie	2	6	4

Second round
10	(Spain) Carmen Perea	2	1
(Italy) Patrizia Murgo	6	6
(United States) Jean Hepner	6	6
(Sweden) Catrin Jexell	3	2

Qualifying competition
(Italy) Patrizia Murgo	4	3
(United States) Jean Hepner	6	6

=== Eighth qualifier ===
First round
15	(Australia) Pam Whytcross	6	6
(United States) Genevieve Greiwe	1	3
(United States) Cathy Farrell	6	6
(United States) Jackie Joseph	3	3
(United States) Jenni Goodling	1	1
(United States) Lucy Gordon	6	6
(Mexico) Susana Rojas	2	0
2	(Peru) Pilar Vásquez	6	6

Second round
15	(Australia) Pam Whytcross	6	6
(United States) Cathy Farrell	3	2
(United States) Lucy Gordon	2	2
2	(Peru) Pilar Vásquez	6	6

Qualifying competition
15	(Australia) Pam Whytcross	6	6
2	(Peru) Pilar Vásquez	4	3
