= 1983 Benson and Hedges Open – Doubles =

Doubles
- 1983 Benson and Hedges Open

Final
- Champions: (New Zealand) Chris Lewis (New Zealand) Russell Simpson
- Runners-up: (Australia) David Graham (Australia) Laurie Warder
- Score: 7–6, 6–3

Events
Singles	Doubles
- Benson and Hedges Open

Chris Lewis and Russell Simpson defeated David Graham and Laurie Warder to win the 1983 Benson and Hedges Open doubles competition.

== Seeds ==
A champion seed is indicated in bold text while text in italics indicates the round in which that seed was eliminated.

1. (Australia) John Alexander / (Australia) Phil Dent (first round)
2. (United States) Scott McCain / (South Africa) Bernard Mitton (first round)
3. (Australia) Rod Frawley / (New Zealand) Jeff Simpson (semifinals)
4. (Australia) David Graham / (Australia) Laurie Warder (final)

== Draw ==
First round
1	(Australia) J Alexander (Australia) P Dent	6	4
**(United States) R Crowley** **(United States) R Evett**	**7**	**6**
**(United States) M Grant** **(Australia) S Maloney**	**7**	3	**6**
(United States) S Brawley (New Zealand) M Lewis	6	**6**	4
(Australia) C Fancutt (United States) D Siegler	**6**	3	4
4	**(Australia) D Graham** **(Australia) L Warder**	4	**6**	**6**
**(Australia) R Case** **(Australia) B Drewett**	**6**	3	**7**
(Australia) P Johnston (Australia) J McCurdy	3	**6**	5
**(New Zealand) B Derlin** **(New Zealand) D Mustard**	**6**	**6**
(Australia) H Hansson (Brazil) E Oncins	3	4
(United States) Scott Bondurant (United States) Armand Molino	**7**	4	5
3	**(Australia) R Frawley** **(New Zealand) J Simpson**	6	**6**	**7**
**(Australia) B Dyke** **(Australia) G Whitecross**	**6**	**6**
(Australia) J Frawley (New Zealand) D Lewis	4	4
**(New Zealand) C Lewis** **(New Zealand) R Simpson**	**6**	3	**6**
2	(United States) S McCain (South Africa) B Mitton	4	**6**	3

Quarterfinals
**(United States) R Crowley** **(United States) R Evett**	**7**	**6**
(United States) M Grant (Australia) S Maloney	6	3
4	**(Australia) D Graham** **(Australia) L Warder**	**7**	**6**
(Australia) R Case (Australia) B Drewett	5	2
(New Zealand) B Derlin (New Zealand) D Mustard	6	4
3	**(Australia) R Frawley** **(New Zealand) J Simpson**	**7**	**6**
(Australia) B Dyke (Australia) G Whitecross	**7**	6	2
**(New Zealand) C Lewis** **(New Zealand) R Simpson**	6	**7**	**6**

Semifinals
(United States) R Crowley (United States) R Evett	**6**	1	4
4	**(Australia) D Graham** **(Australia) L Warder**	4	**6**	**6**
3	(Australia) R Frawley (New Zealand) J Simpson	6	**6**	3
**(New Zealand) C Lewis** **(New Zealand) R Simpson**	**7**	4	**6**

Final
4	(Australia) D Graham (Australia) L Warder	6	3
**(New Zealand) C Lewis** **(New Zealand) R Simpson**	**7**	**6**
