= 1985 Benson and Hedges Open – Singles =

Singles
- 1985 Benson and Hedges Open

Final
- Champion: (New Zealand) Chris Lewis
- Runner-up: (Australia) Wally Masur
- Score: 7–5, 6–0, 2–6, 6–4

Details
- Draw: 32 (4 Q )
- Seeds: 8

Events
Singles	Doubles
← 1984 ·	ATP Auckland Open	· 1986 →

Chris Lewis defeated Wally Masur 7–5, 6–0, 2–6, 6–4 to win the 1985 Benson and Hedges Open singles competition. Danny Saltz was the defending champion.

== Seeds ==
A champion seed is indicated in bold text while text in italics indicates the round in which that seed was eliminated.

1. (Australia) John Fitzgerald (semifinals)
2. (United Kingdom) John Lloyd (second round)
3. (United States) Leif Shiras (second round)
4. (United States) Dan Cassidy (first round)
5. (Australia) Brad Drewett (quarterfinals)
6. (Australia) Peter Doohan (quarterfinals)
7. (New Zealand) Chris Lewis **(champion)**
8. (Australia) Wally Masur (final)

== Draw ==
=== Key ===
- Q - Qualifier
- NB: The Final was the best of 5 sets while all other rounds were the best of 3 sets.

=== Final ===
Final
8	(Australia) Wally Masur	5	0	**6**	4
7	(New Zealand) **Chris Lewis**	**7**	**6**	2	**6**

=== Section 1 ===
First round
1	(Australia) **J Fitzgerald**	2	**6**	**6**
(United States) K Belcher	**6**	3	4
(United States) M Wooldridge	**6**	4	3
(West Germany) **K Meiler**	2	**6**	**6**
(United States) **H Sands**	3	**6**	**6**
(United States) J Canter	**6**	3	4
Q	(Australia) R Barlow	**6**	2	3
5	(Australia) **B Drewett**	2	**6**	**6**
3	(United States) **L Shiras**	3	**6**	**8**
(New Zealand) D Lewis	**6**	2	6
(New Zealand) M Long	2	1
(New Zealand) **K Evernden**	**6**	**6**
(United Kingdom) J Smith	**7**	0	3
(Australia) **B Dyke**	6	**6**	**6**
(New Zealand) D Mustard	**6**	3	3
8	(Australia) **W Masur**	4	**6**	**6**

Second round
1	(Australia) **J Fitzgerald**	**6**	4	**6**
(West Germany) K Meiler	0	**6**	1
(United States) H Sands	4	4
5	(Australia) **B Drewett**	**6**	**6**
3	(United States) L Shiras	**7**	3	3
(New Zealand) **K Evernden**	6	**6**	**6**
(Australia) B Dyke	4	1
8	(Australia) **W Masur**	**6**	**6**

Quarterfinals
1	(Australia) **J Fitzgerald**	**7**	**7**
5	(Australia) B Drewett	6	5
(New Zealand) K Evernden	4	**6**	7
8	(Australia) **W Masur**	**6**	2	**9**

Semifinals
1	(Australia) J Fitzgerald	**7**	5	5
8	(Australia) **W Masur**	5	**7**	**7**

=== Section 2 ===
First round
6	(Australia) **P Doohan**	**6**	**6**
(New Zealand) B Derlin	2	2
(Australia) **C Miller**	**6**	**6**
Q	(Australia) M Fancutt	2	1
Q	(United States) R Akel	**6**	3	4
(United States) **J Turpin**	4	**6**	**6**
(United States) **D Saltz**	**7**	**6**
4	(United States) D Cassidy	5	3
7	(New Zealand) **C Lewis**	**6**	**6**
(New Zealand) S Guy	4	1
(United States) **S McCain**	**6**	**7**
Q	(United States) C Stansbury	4	5
(United States) **G Layendecker**	2	**6**	**9**
(Australia) P Johnston	**6**	1	7
(South Africa) B Levine	2	2
2	(United Kingdom) **J Lloyd**	**6**	**6**

Second round
6	(Australia) **P Doohan**	**6**	**6**
(Australia) C Miller	3	4
(United States) J Turpin	**6**	4	3
(United States) **D Saltz**	4	**6**	**6**
7	(New Zealand) **C Lewis**	**6**	**6**
(United States) S McCain	1	4
(United States) **G Layendecker**	**6**	**7**
2	(United Kingdom) J Lloyd	4	6

Quarterfinals
6	(Australia) P Doohan	4	**6**	4
(United States) **D Saltz**	**6**	4	**6**
7	(New Zealand) **C Lewis**	**7**	**6**
(United States) G Layendecker	5	3

Semifinals
(United States) D Saltz	6	6
7	(New Zealand) **C Lewis**	**7**	**7**
