= Barbie Bramblett =

American tennis player (born 1964)

- Full name: Barbara Christine Bramblett
- Country (sports): United States
- Born: September 14, 1964 (age 60)
- Plays: Right-handed
- Prize money: $39,649

Singles
- Career record: 8–13

Grand Slam singles results
- French Open: 1R (1983, 1984)
- Wimbledon: 1R (1983, 1984)
- US Open: 1R (1982, 1983, 1984)

Doubles

Grand Slam doubles results
- French Open: 1R (1982, 1983, 1984)
- US Open: 1R (1982)

Grand Slam mixed doubles results
- French Open: 1R (1983)

Barbara Christine Bramblett (born September 14, 1964) is an American former professional tennis player.

== Tennis career ==
Bramblett, a right-handed player from Houston, was an Orange Bowl champion in 1980 and competed on the professional tour from 1982 to 1985. She made several main draw appearances in grand slam tournaments, without registering a win. In WTA tournaments she twice reached quarter-finals, at Tokyo in 1982 and the 1984 Miami Classic.

=== Comebacks ===
Her career is perhaps best remembered for two matches she played in 1983, where she saved a combined 38 match points. At the 1983 US Open she trailed Ann Hulbert during the qualifiers 0–6, 0–5 and 0–40, before saving 18 match points to claim the second set 7–5, then the third 6–3.

Bramblett had made a near identical comeback earlier in the year while trying to qualify for the Virginia Slims of Nashville, saving 20 match points to comeback from 1–6, 0–5 against Kathy Holton, not dropping a further game.
