= 1985 Benson and Hedges Open =

- Date: 7–14 January
- Edition: 18th
- Category: Grand Prix
- Draw: 32S / 16D
- Prize money: $80,000
- Surface: Hard / outdoor
- Location: Auckland, New Zealand

Champions

Singles
- (New Zealand) Chris Lewis

Doubles
- (Australia) John Fitzgerald / (New Zealand) Chris Lewis
← 1984 ·	ATP Auckland Open	· 1986 →

The 1985 Benson and Hedges Open was a men's Grand Prix tennis tournament played on outdoor hard courts in Auckland, New Zealand. It was the 18th edition of the tournament and was held from 7 January to 14 January 1985. Seventh-seeded Chris Lewis won the singles title.

== Finals ==
=== Singles ===
(New Zealand) Chris Lewis defeated (Australia) Wally Masur 7–5, 6–0, 2–6, 6–4

- It was Lewis's second title of the year and the 11th of his career.

=== Doubles ===
(Australia) John Fitzgerald / (New Zealand) Chris Lewis defeated (Australia) Broderick Dyke / (Australia) Wally Masur 7–6, 6–2

- It was Fitzgerald's first title of the year and the 13th of his career. It was Lewis's first title of the year and the 10th of his career.
