= 1983 Benson and Hedges Open – Singles =

Singles
- 1983 Benson and Hedges Open

Final
- Champion: (Australia) John Alexander
- Runner-up: (New Zealand) Russell Simpson
- Score: 6–4, 6–3, 6–3

Details
- Draw: 32 (4 Q )
- Seeds: 8

Events
Singles	Doubles
- ATP Auckland Open

John Alexander defeated Russell Simpson 6–4, 6–3, 6–3 to win the 1983 Benson and Hedges Open singles competition. Tim Wilkison was the champion but did not defend his title.

== Seeds ==
A champion seed is indicated in bold text while text in italics indicates the round in which that seed was eliminated.

1. (Australia) John Alexander **(champion)**
2. (New Zealand) Russell Simpson (final)
3. (New Zealand) Chris Lewis (semifinals)
4. (Australia) Phil Dent (first round)
5. (Australia) Rod Frawley (semifinals)
6. (Australia) Brad Drewett (second round)
7. (South Africa) Bernard Mitton (quarterfinals)
8. (New Zealand) Jeff Simpson (quarterfinals)

== Draw ==
=== Key ===
- Q – Qualifier
- NB: The Final was the best of 5 sets while all other rounds were the best of 3 sets.

=== Final ===
Final
1	(Australia) **John Alexander**	**6**	**6**	**6**
2	(New Zealand) Russell Simpson	4	3	3

=== Section 1 ===
First round
1	(Australia) **J Alexander**	**6**	**6**
(Australia) J Frawley	2	3
(Australia) G Whitecross	4	1
(United Kingdom) **J Lloyd**	**6**	**6**
(United States) **D Siegler**	**7**	2	**6**
(United States) J Turpin	5	**6**	4
(Australia) P Johnston	3	**7**	6
6	(Australia) **B Drewett**	**6**	5	**8**
3	(New Zealand) **C Lewis**	**6**	**6**
(United States) S McCain	3	4
(Australia) **J McCurdy**	**7**	**6**
(New Zealand) D Mustard	6	3
(New Zealand) **D Lewis**	3	**6**	**6**
(United States) R Evett	**6**	4	4
Q	(Australia) R Case	2	**6**	6
7	(South Africa) **B Mitton**	**6**	3	**8**

Second round
1	(Australia) **J Alexander**	**7**	**6**
(United Kingdom) J Lloyd	6	4
(United States) **D Siegler**	6	**6**	**7**
6	(Australia) B Drewett	**7**	4	6
3	(New Zealand) **C Lewis**	**6**	**6**
(Australia) J McCurdy	3	4
(New Zealand) D Lewis	1	1
7	(South Africa) **B Mitton**	**6**	**6**

Quarterfinals
1	(Australia) **J Alexander**	**6**	**6**
(United States) D Siegler	1	4
3	(New Zealand) **C Lewis**	6	**6**	**7**
7	(South Africa) B Mitton	**7**	4	5

Semifinals
1	(Australia) **J Alexander**	**7**	**6**
3	(New Zealand) C Lewis	6	4

=== Section 2 ===
First round
5	(Australia) **R Frawley**	**7**	4	**6**
Q	(United States) M McDonald	6	**6**	1
(New Zealand) Ron Dutton	2	1
(Australia) **D Graham**	**6**	**6**
Q	(United States) Robert Crames	1	4
(United States) **Armand Molino**	**6**	**6**
(Australia) **B Dyke**	**6**	5	**6**
4	(Australia) P Dent	4	**7**	3
8	(New Zealand) **J Simpson**	**6**	**6**
Q	(Australia) Craig Tregonning	4	4
(United States) R Crowley	1	3
(New Zealand) **B Derlin**	**6**	**6**
(New Zealand) M Lewis	1	3
(Australia) **C Fancutt**	**6**	**6**
(Brazil) E Oncins	6	2
2	(New Zealand) **R Simpson**	**7**	**6**

Second round
5	(Australia) **R Frawley**	**6**	**6**
(Australia) D Graham	4	3
(United States) A Molino	4	**7**	3
(Australia) **B Dyke**	**6**	5	**6**
8	(New Zealand) **J Simpson**	4	**6**	**8**
(New Zealand) B Derlin	**6**	3	6
(Australia) C Fancutt	4	4
2	(New Zealand) **R Simpson**	**6**	**6**

Quarterfinals
5	(Australia) **R Frawley**	**6**	**6**
(Australia) B Dyke	2	1
8	(New Zealand) J Simpson	2	4
2	(New Zealand) **R Simpson**	**6**	**6**

Semifinals
5	(Australia) R Frawley	4	**6**	4
2	(New Zealand) **R Simpson**	**6**	3	**6**
