= Kathy O'Brien =

American tennis player

- Country (sports): United States

Singles

Grand Slam singles results
- US Open: Q2 (1978, 1981)

Doubles

Grand Slam doubles results
- US Open: 2R (1983)

Grand Slam mixed doubles results
- US Open: 2R (1983)

Kathy O'Brien is an American former professional tennis player.

O'Brien was a four-time All-American tennis player for the UCLA Bruins, the first in the program's history to achieve such honors. She and Helena Manset were doubles runners-up at the 1982 NCAA Championships.

As a professional player, O'Brien made the second round of the US Open in both women's doubles and mixed doubles. This includes when she partnered Terry Holladay at the 1983 US Open and took a set off top seeds Martina Navratilova and Pam Shriver, who were putting together a record 109-match winning streak.

Now known as Kathy Alex, she and her husband Chris are parents to nine children.
