= Derek Tarr =

American tennis player (born 1959)

- Country (sports): South Africa; United States
- Residence: Birmingham, Alabama, U.S.
- Born: September 15, 1959 (age 66) East London, South Africa
- Height: 6 ft 1 in (1.85 m)
- Plays: Left-handed
- Prize money: $128,284

Singles
- Career record: 18–40
- Career titles: 0
- Highest ranking: No. 87 (September 12, 1983)

Grand Slam singles results
- French Open: 1R (1982, 1983, 1984)
- Wimbledon: 2R (1984)
- US Open: 2R (1983)

Doubles
- Career record: 35–60
- Career titles: 0
- Highest ranking: No. 80 (January 3, 1983)

Grand Slam doubles results
- French Open: QF (1982)
- Wimbledon: 1R (1984)
- US Open: 2R (1987)

Derek John Tarr (born September 15, 1959) is an American former professional tennis player, originally from South Africa.

== Career ==
While at Auburn University, Tarr played tennis in the Southeastern Conference and was the singles champion in 1981. In the same year he became Auburn's first ever All-American and would be selected a further two times.

Tarr twice made the second round of the singles draw in a Grand Slam tournament. He defeated Mike De Palmer at the 1983 US Open and beat Christophe Roger-Vasselin at the 1984 Wimbledon Championships. His best performance on tour came in the 1984 Cincinnati Open, part of the Grand Prix Tennis Championship Series, where he reached the round of 16. He registered upset wins over Tim Mayotte at Queen's in 1982 and Henri Leconte in the 1985 Madrid Tennis Grand Prix event.

He had more success on the doubles circuit, making the quarter-finals of the 1982 French Open, with Brad Guan. Tarr was also a Grand Prix semi-finalist twice, at South Orange Open in 1982 (partnering John James) and in Madrid three years later (partnering Marcos Hocevar). The best win of his doubles career came in 1983 at the Sovran Bank Classic, where he and Jonathan Canter upset top seeds Mark Edmondson and Sherwood Stewart, who had just won the French Open.

Tarr was based in Birmingham, Alabama during his career and became an American citizen on February 28, 1986.

He has been the head coach of the UAB Blazers tennis team since 1989.

== Challenger titles ==
=== Doubles: (3) ===
No.	Year	Tournament	Surface	Partner	Opponents	Score
1.	1982	Buchholz, West Germany	Hard	(United States) Mike Gandolfo	(Czechoslovakia) Jiří Průcha (Sweden) Tenny Svensson	6–4, 6–4
2.	1985	West Palm, United States	Clay	(United States) Erik Van't Hof	(Mexico) Leonardo Lavalle (Peru) Jaime Yzaga	6–2, 6–0
3.	1986	West Palm, United States	Clay	(United States) John Ross	(United States) Ricky Brown (United States) Tim Siegel	4–6, 6–4, 6–4
