= 1983 Benson and Hedges Open =

- Date: 10–16 January
- Edition: 16th
- Category: Grand Prix
- Draw: 32S / 16D
- Prize money: $75,000
- Surface: Hard / outdoor
- Location: Auckland, New Zealand

Champions

Singles
- (Australia) John Alexander

Doubles
- (New Zealand) Chris Lewis / (New Zealand) Russell Simpson
← 1982 ·	ATP Auckland Open	· 1984 →

The 1983 Benson and Hedges Open was a men's Grand Prix tennis tournament held in Auckland, New Zealand. It was the 16th edition of the APT Auckland Open tournament and was held from 10 January to 16 January 1983. First-seeded John Alexander won the singles title.

== Finals ==
=== Singles ===
(Australia) John Alexander defeated (New Zealand) Russell Simpson 6–4, 6–3, 6–3

- It was Alexander's 1st title of the year and the 34th of his career.

=== Doubles ===
(New Zealand) Chris Lewis / (New Zealand) Russell Simpson defeated (Australia) David Graham / (Australia) Laurie Warder 7–6, 6–3

- It was Lewis's 1st title of the year and the 8th of his career. It was Simpson's only title of the year and the 6th of his career.
