= 1983 US Open – Mixed doubles =

Mixed doubles
- 1983 US Open
- 1982 Champions: (United States) Anne Smith (South Africa) Kevin Curren

Final
- Champions: (Australia) Elizabeth Sayers (Australia) John Fitzgerald
- Runners-up: (United States) Barbara Potter (United States) Ferdi Taygan
- Score: 3–6, 6–3, 6–4

Details
- Draw: 32
- Seeds: 8

Events
| Singles | men | women | | boys | girls |
| Doubles | men | women | mixed | boys | girls |
| WC Singles | men | women | quad |
| WC Doubles | men | women | quad |
| Legends | men | women | mixed |
- US Open

Anne Smith and Kevin Curren were the defending champions but did not compete that year.

Elizabeth Sayers and John Fitzgerald won in the final 3–6, 6–3, 6–4 against Barbara Potter and Ferdi Taygan.

== Seeds ==
Champion seeds are indicated in bold text while text in italics indicates the round in which those seeds were eliminated.

1. (United States) Barbara Potter / (United States) Ferdi Taygan (final)
2. (United States) Kathy Jordan / (United States) Eliot Teltscher (second round)
3. (Australia) Wendy Turnbull / (United Kingdom) John Lloyd (semifinals)
4. (United States) Sharon Walsh / (United States) Dick Stockton (quarterfinals)
5. (Brazil) Cláudia Monteiro / (Brazil) Cássio Motta (first round)
6. (United States) Billie Jean King / (United States) Trey Waltke (second round)
7. (United States) JoAnne Russell / (United States) Eric Fromm (quarterfinals)
8. (United States) Rosemary Casals / (United States) Butch Walts (first round)

== Draw ==
Key

- Q = Qualifier
- WC = Wild card
- LL = Lucky loser
- Alt = Alternate
- ITF = ITF entry
- PR = Protected ranking
- SR = Special ranking
- SE = Special exempt
- JE = Junior exempt
- JR = Junior Accelerator Programme entrant
- CO = College Accelerator Programme entrant
- NG = Next Gen Accelerator Program entrant
- w/o = Walkover
- r = Retired
- d = Defaulted

=== Final ===
| Final |
| 1 | (United States) Barbara Potter (United States) Ferdi Taygan | **6** | 3 | 4 |
| | (Australia) **Elizabeth Sayers** (Australia) **John Fitzgerald** | 3 | **6** | **6** |

=== Top half ===
First round
1 | (United States) **B Potter** (United States) **F Taygan** | 6 | **7** | **7**
(United Kingdom) A Croft (Ecuador) A Gómez | **7** | 5 | 6
(South Africa) **R Fairbank** (South Africa) **B Pirow** | **6** | **6**
(United States) S Mascarin (United States) T Delatte | 2 | 4
(United Kingdom) **A Hobbs** (India) **A Amritraj** | 4 | **7** | **7**
(South Africa) Y Vermaak (South Africa) D Visser | **6** | 5 | 6
(United States) **K O'Brien** (United States) **S Meister** | **6** | **6**
8 | (United States) R Casals (United States) B Walts | 4 | 4
3 | (Australia) **W Turnbull** (United Kingdom) **J Lloyd** | **6** | **6**
(West Germany) E Pfaff (United States) D Ralston | 3 | 4
(United States) **A M Fernandez** (United States) **S Brawley** | **6** | **6**
(United States) D Robb (United States) J Osborne | 4 | 2
(United States) L Forood (South Africa) M Myburg | 4 | **6** | 3
(Australia) **D Balestrat** (Australia) **K Warwick** | **6** | 3 | **6**
(United States) P Teeguarden (Australia) F Stolle | 3 | 2
7 | (United States) **J Russell** (United States) **E Fromm** | **6** | **6**

Second round
1 | (United States) **B Potter** (United States) **F Taygan** | **6** | **6**
(South Africa) R Fairbank (South Africa) B Pirow | 2 | 3
(United Kingdom) **A Hobbs** (India) **A Amritraj** | **6** | **7**
(United States) K O'Brien (United States) S Meister | 2 | 5
3 | (Australia) **W Turnbull** (United Kingdom) **J Lloyd** | **7** | **6**
(United States) A M Fernandez (United States) S Brawley | 6 | 3
(Australia) D Balestrat (Australia) K Warwick | 4 | **7** | 3
7 | (United States) **J Russell** (United States) **E Fromm** | **6** | 6 | **6**

Quarterfinals
1 | (United States) **B Potter** (United States) **F Taygan** | **6** | **6**
(United Kingdom) A Hobbs (India) A Amritraj | 4 | 4
3 | (Australia) **W Turnbull** (United Kingdom) **J Lloyd** | **6** | **6**
7 | (United States) J Russell (United States) E Fromm | 3 | 4

Semifinals
1 | (United States) **B Potter** (United States) **F Taygan** | **7** | **6**
3 | (Australia) W Turnbull (United Kingdom) J Lloyd | 6 | 3

=== Bottom half ===
First round
6 | (United States) **B J King** (United States) **T Waltke** | 6 | **6** | **6**
(United States) M-L Piatek (Australia) R Case | **7** | 3 | 3
(United States) **K Shaefer** (Australia) **S Ball** | 6 | **7** | **6**
(United States) L Allen (United States) C Strode | **7** | 5 | 2
(United States) A Moulton (United States) S Davis | **6** | 4 | 6
(United States) **Z Garrison** (United States) **R Harmon** | 2 | **6** | **7**
(Australia) A Minter (Australia) B Dyke | **6** | 2 | 2
4 | (United States) **S Walsh** (United States) **D Stockton** | 3 | **6** | **6**
5 | (Brazil) C Monteiro (Brazil) C Motta | 4 | **7** | 5
(United States) **S Acker** (United States) **D Gitlin** | **6** | 5 | **7**
(United States) C Benjamin (United States) G Donnelly | **6** | 3 | 4
(Australia) **E Minter** (United States) **R Crowley** | 2 | **6** | **6**
(United States) A Kiyomura (Zimbabwe) A Pattison | 2 | 3
(Australia) **E Sayers** (Australia) **J Fitzgerald** | **6** | **6**
(United States) B Herr (United States) G Holmes | 5 | 4
2 | (United States) **K Jordan** (United States) **E Teltscher** | **7** | **6**

Second round
6 | (United States) B J King (United States) T Waltke | 5 | 4
(United States) **K Shaefer** (Australia) **S Ball** | **7** | **6**
(United States) Z Garrison (United States) R Harmon | 6 | 2
4 | (United States) **S Walsh** (United States) **D Stockton** | **7** | **6**
(United States) **S Acker** (United States) **D Gitlin** | **7** | **6**
(Australia) E Minter (United States) R Crowley | 5 | 2
(Australia) **E Sayers** (Australia) **J Fitzgerald** | **6** | **6**
2 | (United States) K Jordan (United States) E Teltscher | 4 | 2

Quarterfinals
(United States) **K Shaefer** (Australia) **S Ball** | **6** | **6**
4 | (United States) S Walsh (United States) D Stockton | 1 | 4
(United States) S Acker (United States) D Gitlin | 5 | 4
(Australia) **E Sayers** (Australia) **J Fitzgerald** | **7** | **6**

Semifinals
(United States) K Shaefer (Australia) S Ball | **6** | 4 | 4
(Australia) **E Sayers** (Australia) **J Fitzgerald** | 1 | **6** | **6**
