= 1986 Benson and Hedges Open – Singles =

Singles
- 1986 Benson and Hedges Open

Final
- Champion: (Czechoslovakia) Miloslav Mečíř
- Runner-up: (Netherlands) Michiel Schapers
- Score: 6–4, 6–3, 3–6, 6–4

Details
- Draw: 32 (4 Q / 3 WC )
- Seeds: 8

Events
Singles	Doubles
- ATP Auckland Open

Miloslav Mečíř defeated Michiel Schapers 6–4, 6–3, 3–6, 6–4 to win singles title at the 1986 Benson and Hedges Open tennis tournament, held in Auckland, New Zealand. Chris Lewis was the defending champion but did not defend his title.

== Seeds ==
A champion seed is indicated in bold text while text in italics indicates the round in which that seed was eliminated.

1. (United States) Bud Schultz (final)
2. (United States) Ben Testerman (second round)
3. (New Zealand) Kelly Evernden (second round)
4. (Netherlands) Michiel Schapers (second round)
5. (Australia) Wally Masur (semifinals)
6. (Australia) Peter Doohan (first round)
7. (Australia) Broderick Dyke (first round)
8. (New Zealand) Russell Simpson (second round)

== Draw ==
Key

- Q = Qualifier
- WC = Wild card
- LL = Lucky loser
- Alt = Alternate
- ITF = ITF entry
- PR = Protected ranking
- SR = Special ranking
- SE = Special exempt
- JE = Junior exempt
- JR = Junior Accelerator Programme entrant
- CO = College Accelerator Programme entrant
- NG = Next Gen Accelerator Program entrant
- w/o = Walkover
- r = Retired
- d = Defaulted
- NB: The Final was the best of 5 sets while all other rounds were the best of 3 sets.

=== Final ===
Final
1	(United States) Bud Schultz	4	3	**6**	4
	(Australia) **Mark Woodforde**	**6**	**6**	3	**6**

=== Section 1 ===
First round
1	(United States) **B Schultz**	**6**	**6**
WC	(New Zealand) S Robinson	0	0
(New Zealand) **S Guy**	4	**6**	**7**
(Australia) P Johnston	**6**	4	5
(Australia) **C Miller**	**6**	**6**
(Argentina) R Saad	3	1
Q	(United Kingdom) J Goodall	5	**6**	2
8	(New Zealand) **R Simpson**	**7**	3	**6**
3	(New Zealand) **K Evernden**	**6**	**7**
(United States) D Saltz	2	5
(United States) **B Dickinson**	4	**6**	**6**
Q	(United States) K Richter	**6**	0	3
(New Zealand) **D Mustard**	**6**	**6**
Q	(New Zealand) M Elley	4	4
(Sweden) P Carlsson	1	0
5	(Australia) **W Masur**	**6**	**6**

Second round
1	(United States) **B Schultz**	**6**	5	**6**
(New Zealand) S Guy	3	**7**	3
(Australia) **C Miller**	**6**	1	**6**
8	(New Zealand) R Simpson	2	**6**	2
3	(New Zealand) K Evernden	6	5
(United States) **B Dickinson**	**7**	**7**
(New Zealand) D Mustard	1	2
5	(Australia) **W Masur**	**6**	**6**

Quarterfinals
1	(United States) **B Schultz**	**7**	**6**
(Australia) C Miller	5	4
(United States) B Dickinson	4	4
5	(Australia) **W Masur**	**6**	**6**

Semifinals
1	(United States) **B Schultz**	**7**	6	**9**
5	(Australia) W Masur	6	**7**	7

=== Section 2 ===
First round
6	(Australia) P Doohan	5	3
(United States) **T Warneke**	**7**	**6**
(United States) R Rudeen	3	**6**	2
WC	(New Zealand) **D Lewis**	**6**	2	**6**
(Australia) **M Woodforde**	**6**	**6**
(West Germany) H Rittersbacher	4	3
(United States) C Stansbury	**6**	4	5
4	(Netherlands) **M Schapers**	4	**6**	**7**
7	(Australia) B Dyke	2	1
(United States) **B Scanlon**	**6**	**6**
(Austria) A Antonitsch	3	2
(New Zealand) **B Derlin**	**6**	**6**
WC	(New Zealand) B Steven	3	6
(Australia) **B Drewett**	**6**	**7**
Q	(Australia) N Borwick	3	**7**	12
2	(United States) **B Testerman**	**6**	6	**14**

Second round
(United States) T Warneke	6	5
WC	(New Zealand) **D Lewis**	**7**	**7**
(Australia) **M Woodforde**	**6**	**4**
4	(Netherlands) M Schapers	4	2	R
(United States) **B Scanlon**	**6**	3	**6**
(New Zealand) B Derlin	2	**6**	3
(Australia) **B Drewett**	**6**	4	**6**
2	(United States) B Testerman	4	**6**	4

Quarterfinals
WC	(New Zealand) D Lewis	2	2
(Australia) **M Woodforde**	**6**	**6**
(United States) **B Scanlon**	**6**	**6**
(Australia) B Drewett	4	2

Semifinals
(Australia) **M Woodforde**	**6**	2	**6**
(United States) B Scanlon	1	**6**	4
