= Cathy Farrell =

American tennis player

- Full name: Cathleen Farrell
- Country (sports): United States
- Born: March 16, 1957 (age 68)

Singles

Grand Slam singles results
- Wimbledon: Q1 (1982)
- US Open: Q2 (1982)

Cathleen Farrell (born March 16, 1957) is an American former professional tennis player.

Farrell grew up in Dunkirk, New York and after finishing high school trained under Finnish tennis coach Rauno Suominen in Buffalo. She began competing on the international tour during the late 1970s and in 1980 featured in the singles main draw of two WTA Tour tournaments. Her career titles include the 1983 Arthur Ashe Tennis Classic held in Flushing Meadows. She is a member of both the Chautauqua Sports Hall of Fame and Buffalo Tennis Hall of Fame.
