= Susana Rojas =

Mexican tennis player

- Country (sports): Mexico
- College: University of Miami

Singles

Grand Slam singles results
- US Open: Q1 (1982)

Susana Rojas is a Mexican former professional tennis player.

Rojas, who comes from Veracruz, represented the Mexico Federation Cup team in a 1977 tie against Italy. She was called up for a dead doubles rubber, which she and Alina Balbiers won over Italy's Évelyne Terras and Manuela Zoni.

In 1981 she had a first round win over Heather Ludloff at the Hong Kong Classic, to reach the second round of a WTA tournament for the only time. She also featured in the main draw at the Borden Classic and Japan Open that year.

Rojas appeared in the qualifying draw for the 1982 US Open.

From 1984 to 1987, Rojas played varsity tennis for the Miami Hurricanes.
