= Mike Gandolfo =

American tennis player

- Full name: Mike Gandolfo
- Country (sports): United States
- Born: October 3, 1958 (age 66); Fort Lauderdale, Florida
- Plays: Left-handed

Singles
- Career record: 6–9
- Career titles: 0
- Highest ranking: No. 203 (January 3, 1983)

Grand Slam singles results
- Australian Open: 2R (1982)
- US Open: 1R (1980, 1983)

Doubles
- Career record: 14–22
- Career titles: 0
- Highest ranking: No. 75 (January 3, 1983)

Grand Slam doubles results
- Australian Open: 3R (1982)
- Wimbledon: 1R (1982)
- US Open: QF (1983)

Mike Gandolfo (born October 3, 1958) is a former professional tennis player from the United States.

== Biography ==
Born in Fort Lauderdale, Gandolfo went to Santa Fe High School. A late comer to the sport, he didn't start taking tennis seriously until the age of 15. He took up a scholarship to Clemson University, where he played number one singles and was MVP of the ACC Tournament, which they won in his senior year in 1980. For his efforts that season, he was also named ITCA Senior Player of the Year and became Clemson's first tennis All-American.

During the early 1980s, he competed professionally and reached as high as 75 in the world in doubles, with three semi-final appearances in Grand Prix tournaments. He also won a Challenger tournament in West Germany in 1982 and competed in main draws of the men's doubles at the Australian Open, US Open and Wimbledon. In the 1983 US Open, he made the quarter-finals of the men's doubles with Gary Donnelly.

As a singles player, he had his best performance at a Grand Prix event in Melbourne in 1982, with wins over John Fitzgerald and Chris Johnstone, before he lost a close quarter-final to Pat Cash, which went to a final set tiebreak. He made the main singles draw of 1982 Australian Open and twice at the US Open.

== Challenger titles ==
=== Doubles: (1) ===
No.	Year	Tournament	Surface	Partner	Opponents	Score
1.	1982	Buchholz, West Germany	Hard	(South Africa) Derek Tarr	(Czechoslovakia) Jiří Průcha (Sweden) Tenny Svensson	6–4, 6–4
