= 1984 Benson and Hedges Open =

- Date: 9–15 January 1984
- Edition: 17th
- Category: Grand Prix
- Draw: 32S / 16D
- Prize money: $75,000
- Surface: Hard / outdoor
- Location: Auckland, New Zealand

Champions

Singles
- (United States) Danny Saltz

Men's doubles
- (South Africa) Brian Levine / (United States) John Van Nostrand
← 1983 ·	ATP Auckland Open	· 1985 →

The 1984 Benson and Hedges Open was a men's Grand Prix tennis tournament held in Auckland, New Zealand and played on outdoor hard courts. It was the 17th edition of the tournament and was held 9–15 January 1984. Unseeded Danny Saltz won the singles title.

== Finals ==
=== Singles ===
(United States) Danny Saltz defeated (United States) Chip Hooper 4–6, 6–3, 6–4, 6–4

- It was Saltz's only title of the year and the 1st of his career.

=== Doubles ===
(South Africa) Brian Levine / (United States) John Van Nostrand defeated (Australia) Brad Drewett / (United States) Chip Hooper 7–5, 6–2
