= 1986 Benson and Hedges Open =

- Date: 6–20 January
- Edition: 19th
- Category: Grand Prix
- Draw: 32S / 16D
- Prize money: $85,000
- Surface: Hard / outdoor
- Location: Auckland, New Zealand

Champions

Singles
- (Australia) Mark Woodforde

Doubles
- (Australia) Broderick Dyke / (Australia) Wally Masur
- ATP Auckland Open

The 1986 Benson and Hedges Open was a men's Grand Prix tennis tournament played on outdoor hard courts in Auckland, New Zealand. It was the 19th edition of the tournament and was held from 6 January to 20 January 1986. Unseeded Mark Woodforde won the singles title.

== Finals ==
=== Singles ===
(Australia) Mark Woodforde defeated (United States) Bud Schultz 6–4, 6–3, 3–6, 6–4

- It was Woodforde's only title of the year and the 1st of his career.

=== Doubles ===
(Australia) Broderick Dyke / (Australia) Wally Masur defeated (United States) Karl Richter / (United States) Rick Rudeen 6–3, 6–4

- It was Dyke's only title of the year and the 4th of his career. It was Masur's 1st title of the year and the 6th of his career.
