= Grace Kim (tennis) =

American tennis player

- Full name: Grace Kim
- Country (sports): United States
- Born: April 16, 1968 (age 58) South Korea
- Prize money: $128,636

Singles
- Highest ranking: No. 78 (August 31, 1987)

Grand Slam singles results
- French Open: 2R (1985)
- Wimbledon: 2R (1984)
- US Open: 3R (1983, 1985)

Grace Kim (born April 16, 1968) is a former professional tennis player from the United States.

== Biography ==
Kim grew up in Ridgewood, New Jersey but was born in South Korea. She twice made the third round of the US Open, the first time in 1983 was as a 15-year old. Turning professional in 1984, she was a quarter-finalist that year at the Canadian Open, which included a win over Kathy Horvath. At the 1985 US Open she reached the third round again by beating Bettina Bunge and Mary-Lou Piatek, before falling to top seed Chris Evert. One of her biggest wins came in 1986 when she defeated Gabriela Sabatini en route to the quarter-finals in Zurich.
