= 1983 US Open – Men's doubles =

Men's doubles
- 1983 US Open

Final
- Champion: (United States) Peter Fleming (United States) John McEnroe
- Runner-up: (United States) Fritz Buehning (United States) Van Winitsky
- Score: 6–3, 6–4, 6–2

Details
- Draw: 64
- Seeds: 16

Events
Singles	men	women		boys	girls
Doubles	men	women	mixed	boys	girls
WC Singles	men	women	quad
WC Doubles	men	women	quad
Legends	men	women	mixed
- US Open

The men's doubles tournament at the 1983 US Open was held from August 30 to September 11, 1983, on the outdoor hard courts at the USTA National Tennis Center in New York City, United States. Peter Fleming and John McEnroe won the title, defeating Fritz Buehning and Van Winitsky in the final.

== Seeds ==
1. (United States) Peter Fleming / (United States) John McEnroe (champions)
2. (United States) Tim Gullikson / (United States) Tom Gullikson (quarterfinals)
3. (United States) Brian Gottfried / (Australia) Paul McNamee (second round)
4. (Sweden) Anders Järryd / (Sweden) Hans Simonsson (second round)
5. (Brazil) Carlos Kirmayr / (Brazil) Cássio Motta (first round)
6. (Switzerland) Heinz Günthardt / (Czechoslovakia) Tomáš Šmíd (first round)
7. (United States) Mark Dickson / (United States) Sherwood Stewart (quarterfinals)
8. (United States) Sandy Mayer / (United States) Ferdi Taygan (third round)
9. (United States) Victor Amaya / (Australia) Kim Warwick (second round)
10. (United States) Fritz Buehning / (United States) Van Winitsky (final)
11. (Uruguay) Eric Fromm / (Israel) Shlomo Glickstein (first round)
12. (United States) Tracy Delatte / (United States) Johan Kriek (first round)
13. (United States) Chip Hooper / (United States) Peter Rennert (first round)
14. (United States) Mike Bauer / (France) Gilles Moretton (first round)
15. (Sweden) Joakim Nyström / (Sweden) Mats Wilander (second round)
16. (United States) Andy Andrews / (United States) John Sadri (semifinals)

== Draw ==
Key

- Q = Qualifier
- WC = Wild card
- LL = Lucky loser
- Alt = Alternate
- ITF = ITF entry
- PR = Protected ranking
- SR = Special ranking
- SE = Special exempt
- JE = Junior exempt
- JR = Junior Accelerator Programme entrant
- CO = College Accelerator Programme entrant
- NG = Next Gen Accelerator Program entrant
- w/o = Walkover
- r = Retired
- d = Defaulted

=== Finals ===
Quarterfinals
1	(United States) Peter Fleming (United States) John McEnroe	7	6	6
(United States) Gary Donnelly (United States) Mike Gandolfo	6	2	2
(Australia) Pat Cash (Australia) John Fitzgerald	6	6	6
(United States) David Dowlen (Nigeria) Nduka Odizor	1	4	4
7	(United States) Mark Dickson (United States) Sherwood Stewart	6	5	3
16	(United States) Andy Andrews (United States) John Sadri	7	7	6
10	(United States) Fritz Buehning (United States) Van Winitsky	2	6	7	7	6
2	(United States) Tim Gullikson (United States) Tom Gullikson	6	7	5	6	3

Semifinals
1	(United States) Peter Fleming (United States) John McEnroe	6	7	7
(Australia) Pat Cash (Australia) John Fitzgerald	4	6	6
16	(United States) Andy Andrews (United States) John Sadri	4	4	4
10	(United States) Fritz Buehning (United States) Van Winitsky	6	6	6

Final
1	(United States) Peter Fleming (United States) John McEnroe	6	6	6
10	(United States) Fritz Buehning (United States) Van Winitsky	3	4	2

=== Top half ===
==== Section 1 ====
First round
1	(United States) P Fleming (United States) J McEnroe	6	6
(United States) F McNair (United States) T Waltke	3	3
(United States) A Kohlberg (United States) D Pate	6	6
(South Africa) B Pirow (New Zealand) J Simpson	3	2
(Brazil) M Hocevar (Brazil) J Soares	5	7	3
(United States) R Seguso (United States) C Strode	7	6	6
(Chile) J Fillol (Italy) C Panatta	4	6
9	(United States) V Amaya (Australia) K Warwick	6	7
15	(Sweden) J Nyström (Sweden) M Wilander	2	6	6
(United States) M Davis (United States) S Smith	6	4	3
(United States) G Donnelly (United States) M Gandolfo	6	7
(United States) J Lapidus (United States) R Meyer	3	6
(United States) M Leach (United States) E Teltscher	6	6
(Sweden) O Malmqvist (Australia) C Miller	3	3
(United States) S Brawley (United States) E Fernandez	6	2	6
5	(Brazil) C Kirmayr (Brazil) C Motta	4	6	3

Second round
1	(United States) P Fleming (United States) J McEnroe	6	6
(United States) A Kohlberg (United States) D Pate	3	2
(United States) R Seguso (United States) C Strode	7	2	6
9	(United States) V Amaya (Australia) K Warwick	6	6	3
15	(Sweden) J Nyström (Sweden) M Wilander	6	3
(United States) G Donnelly (United States) M Gandolfo	7	6
(United States) M Leach (United States) E Teltscher	7	6
(United States) S Brawley (United States) E Fernandez	6	3

Third round
1	(United States) P Fleming (United States) J McEnroe	6	6
(United States) R Seguso (United States) C Strode	2	4
(United States) G Donnelly (United States) M Gandolfo	6	7	7
(United States) M Leach (United States) E Teltscher	7	5	6

Quarterfinals
1	(United States) P Fleming (United States) J McEnroe	7	6	6
(United States) G Donnelly (United States) M Gandolfo	6	2	2

==== Section 2 ====
First round
4	(Sweden) A Järryd (Sweden) H Simonsson	7	6
(United States) M Estep (Australia) C Fancutt	6	4
(Australia) P Cash (Australia) J Fitzgerald	3	6	7
(United States) K Flach (South Africa) D Tarr	6	4	6
(United States) J Mattke (United States) M Vines	6	6	2
(United States) R Harmon (United States) M Purcell	4	7	6
(United States) S Denton (United States) B Scanlon	6	6
13	(United States) C Hooper (United States) P Rennert	2	3
12	(United States) T Delatte (United States) J Kriek	4	6
(Paraguay) F González (United States) M Mitchell	6	7
(South Africa) R Moore (South Africa) T Viljoen	4	6	3
(United States) D Dowlen (Nigeria) N Odizor	6	3	6
(United States) B Csipkay (United States) T Csipkay	4	2
(India) A Amritraj (India) V Amritraj	6	6
(Ecuador) A Gómez (Romania) I Năstase	6	7	4
8	(United States) S Mayer (United States) F Taygan	7	6	6

Second round
4	(Sweden) A Järryd (Sweden) H Simonsson	4	6	1
(Australia) P Cash (Australia) J Fitzgerald	6	4	6
(United States) R Harmon (United States) M Purcell	7	4	6
(United States) S Denton (United States) B Scanlon	6	6	4
(Paraguay) F González (United States) M Mitchell	2	1
(United States) D Dowlen (Nigeria) N Odizor	6	6
(India) A Amritraj (India) V Amritraj	4	4
8	(United States) S Mayer (United States) F Taygan	6	6

Third round
(Australia) P Cash (Australia) J Fitzgerald	6	6
(United States) R Harmon (United States) M Purcell	2	4
(United States) D Dowlen (Nigeria) N Odizor	6	7
8	(United States) S Mayer (United States) F Taygan	4	6

Quarterfinals
(Australia) P Cash (Australia) J Fitzgerald	6	6	6
(United States) D Dowlen (Nigeria) N Odizor	1	4	4

=== Bottom half ===
==== Section 3 ====
First round
7	(United States) M Dickson (United States) S Stewart	6	3	6
(United States) S Krulevitz (Finland) L Palin	3	6	3
(United States) L Stefanki (United States) R Van't Hof	6	7
(Australia) S Ball (United States) J Canter	1	6
(Australia) R Case (Australia) B Drewett	3	4
(United Kingdom) J Lloyd (United States) D Stockton	6	6
(United States) J Benson (United States) J Turpin	6	6
14	(United States) M Bauer (France) G Moretton	4	4
16	(United States) A Andrews (United States) J Sadri	6	6
(United States) K Diller (United States) B Pearce	4	3
(South Africa) E Edwards (South Africa) D Visser	4	6
(South Africa) B Mitton (United States) B Walts	6	7
(Romania) F Segărceanu (Sweden) H Sundström	3	3
(Sweden) S Edberg (Sweden) S Simonsson	6	6
(United States) T Cain (United States) D Gitlin	5	2
3	(United States) B Gottfried (Australia) P McNamee	w/o

Second round
7	(United States) M Dickson (United States) S Stewart	7	6
(United States) L Stefanki (United States) R Van't Hof	6	3
(United Kingdom) J Lloyd (United States) D Stockton	6	6
(United States) J Benson (United States) J Turpin	3	4
16	(United States) A Andrews (United States) J Sadri	6	6
(South Africa) B Mitton (United States) B Walts	4	4
(Sweden) S Edberg (Sweden) S Simonsson	7	4	7
3	(United States) B Gottfried (Australia) P McNamee	6	6	6

Third round
7	(United States) M Dickson (United States) S Stewart	3	7	7
(United Kingdom) J Lloyd (United States) D Stockton	6	6	6
16	(United States) A Andrews (United States) J Sadri	6	6	6
(Sweden) S Edberg (Sweden) S Simonsson	4	7	4

Quarterfinals
7	(United States) M Dickson (United States) S Stewart	6	5	3
16	(United States) A Andrews (United States) J Sadri	7	7	6

==== Section 4 ====
First round
6	(Switzerland) H Günthardt (Czechoslovakia) T Šmíd	4	6	0
(United States) S Meister (United States) C Wittus	6	4	6
(United States) M Brunnberg (South Africa) C Steyn	6	3	6
(United States) S Giammalva (United States) T Giammalva	3	6	7
(United States) N Saviano (United States) E Sherbeck	3	2	3
(United States) R Hightower (United States) S McCain	6	2	6
(United States) G Haynes (United States) B Levine	3	6
10	(United States) F Buehning (United States) V Winitsky	6	7
11	(United States) E Fromm (Israel) S Glickstein	2	6	4
(United States) L Bourne (Australia) B Dyke	6	3	6
(South Africa) M Myburg (South Africa) C van Rensburg	4	6	1
(United States) R Crowley (United States) R Evett	6	3	6
(Australia) J Newcombe (Australia) F Stolle	3	4
(United States) B Manson (Zimbabwe) A Pattison	6	6
(Chile) R Acuña (United States) E Iskersky	7	4	4
2	(United States) Ti Gullikson (United States) To Gullikson	6	6	6

Second round
(United States) S Meister (United States) C Wittus	6	3	2
(United States) S Giammalva (United States) T Giammalva	1	6	6
(United States) R Hightower (United States) S McCain	4	3
10	(United States) F Buehning (United States) V Winitsky	6	6
(United States) L Bourne (Australia) B Dyke	6	3
(United States) R Crowley (United States) R Evett	7	6
(United States) B Manson (Zimbabwe) A Pattison	3	5
2	(United States) Ti Gullikson (United States) To Gullikson	6	7

Third round
(United States) S Giammalva (United States) T Giammalva	6	3	3
10	(United States) F Buehning (United States) V Winitsky	4	6	6
(United States) R Crowley (United States) R Evett	3	5
2	(United States) Ti Gullikson (United States) To Gullikson	6	7

Quarterfinals
10	(United States) F Buehning (United States) V Winitsky	2	6	7	7	6
2	(United States) Ti Gullikson (United States) To Gullikson	6	7	5	6	3
