= Laura Bernstein =

American tennis player

- Full name: Laura Bernstein-Kassirer
- Country (sports): United States
- Born: March 17, 1963 (age 62); Highland Park, Illinois, U.S.
- Prize money: $37,421

Singles
- Highest ranking: No. 177 (December 21, 1986)

Grand Slam singles results
- Australian Open: 1R (1983)
- French Open: 1R (1985)
- Wimbledon: 1R (1983)
- US Open: 2R (1983)

Doubles

Grand Slam doubles results
- French Open: 2R (1984)
- US Open: 1R (1984)

Laura Bernstein-Kassirer (born March 17, 1963) is an American former professional tennis player.

Bernstein grew up in both Chicago and Florida, being introduced to the sport of tennis when she moved to the latter at the age of twelve. She played two years of college tennis for the University of South Carolina, then in 1983 turned professional and competed on tour until 1989.

During her time on tour she featured in the main draw of all four grand slam tournaments and reached a career high singles ranking of 177 on the WTA Tour. Bernstein, who has a WTA Tour win over Mary Joe Fernández to her name, had her best grand slam performance at the 1983 US Open, where she beat Elizabeth Sayers to make the second round.
