= Rand Evett =

American tennis player

- Country (sports): United States
- Born: March 1, 1954 (age 72)
- Plays: Right-handed

Singles
- Career record: 4–13
- Highest ranking: No. 219 (Jan 3, 1983)

Grand Slam singles results
- Australian Open: 1R (1982)
- French Open: Q2 (1975)
- Wimbledon: 1R (1982)

Doubles
- Career record: 12–31
- Highest ranking: No. 83 (Jan 2, 1984)

Grand Slam doubles results
- Australian Open: 1R (1982)
- French Open: 2R (1983)
- Wimbledon: Q1 (1982, 1984, 1985)
- US Open: 3R (1983)

Rand Evett (born March 1, 1954) is an American former professional tennis player.

Evett, the son of a Yale physics instructor, was raised in Tucson, Arizona, where he attended Catalina High School.

During the early 1970s he played collegiate tennis for the University of Arizona and won back to back WAC singles championships in 1972 and 1973. He also earned NCAA All-American honors in 1973 and 1974. In 1974 he and De Armond Briggs won the doubles title at the national amateur grass‐court championships.

On the professional tour, Evett reached a best world ranking of 219, making singles main draw appearances at the Australian Open and Wimbledon. He had a win over world number 33 Shlomo Glickstein in Tel Aviv in 1983. As a doubles player he was ranked in the world's top 100 and reached the round of 16 at the 1983 US Open.

== ATP Challenger finals ==
=== Doubles: 1 (0–1) ===
Result	Date	Tournament	Surface	Partner	Opponents	Score
Loss	Apr 1983	Ashkelon, Israel	Hard	(United States) Rodney Crowley	(Sweden) Stefan Svensson (Netherlands) Huub van Boeckel	4–6, 6–4, 3–6
