= 1983 US Open – Men's singles =

Men's singles
- 1983 US Open

Final
- Champion: (United States) Jimmy Connors
- Runner-up: (Czechoslovakia) Ivan Lendl
- Score: 6–3, 6–7^{(2–7)}, 7–5, 6–0

Details
- Draw: 128
- Seeds: 16

Events
Singles	men	women		boys	girls
Doubles	men	women	mixed	boys	girls
WC Singles	men	women	quad
WC Doubles	men	women	quad
Legends	men	women	mixed
- US Open

Defending champion Jimmy Connors defeated Ivan Lendl in a rematch of the previous year's final, 6–3, 6–7^{(2–7)}, 7–5, 6–0 to win the men's singles tennis title at the 1983 US Open. It was his fifth US Open singles title, eighth and last major singles title overall, and 100th top-level singles title overall.

This edition of the tournament set an Open Era record for the most five-set matches at a singles major, at 35. It was later surpassed by the 2024 Wimbledon Championships.

== Seeds ==
The seeded players are listed below. Jimmy Connors is the champion; others show the round in which they were eliminated.

1. (United States) John McEnroe (fourth round)
2. (Czechoslovakia) Ivan Lendl (finalist)
3. (United States) Jimmy Connors (champion)
4. (France) Yannick Noah (quarterfinalist)
5. (Sweden) Mats Wilander (quarterfinalist)
6. (Argentina) Guillermo Vilas (third round)
7. n/a
8. (Argentina) José Luis Clerc (first round)
9. (United States) Jimmy Arias (semifinalist)
10. (Spain) José Higueras (second round)
11. (United States) Gene Mayer (third round)
12. (United States) Johan Kriek (fourth round)
13. (United States) Steve Denton (third round)
14. (United States) Eliot Teltscher (quarterfinalist)
15. (United States) Vitas Gerulaitis (third round)
16. (United States) Bill Scanlon (semifinalist)

== Draw ==
Key

- Q = Qualifier
- WC = Wild card
- LL = Lucky loser
- Alt = Alternate
- ITF = ITF entry
- PR = Protected ranking
- SR = Special ranking
- SE = Special exempt
- JE = Junior exempt
- JR = Junior Accelerator Programme entrant
- CO = College Accelerator Programme entrant
- NG = Next Gen Accelerator Program entrant
- w/o = Walkover
- r = Retired
- d = Defaulted

=== Finals ===
Quarterfinals
16	(United States) Bill Scanlon	3	6	4	6	7^{7}
(United States) Mark Dickson	6	4	6	3	6^{4}
3	(United States) Jimmy Connors	7^{7}	6	6
14	(United States) Eliot Teltscher	6^{0}	2	2
9	(United States) Jimmy Arias	7^{7}	4	6	1	7
4	(France) Yannick Noah	6^{4}	6	3	6	5
5	(Sweden) Mats Wilander	4	4	6^{4}
2	(Czechoslovakia) Ivan Lendl	6	6	7^{7}

Semifinals
16	(United States) Bill Scanlon	2	3	2
3	(United States) Jimmy Connors	6	6	6
9	(United States) Jimmy Arias	2	6^{3}	1
2	(Czechoslovakia) Ivan Lendl	6	7^{7}	6

Final
3	(United States) Jimmy Connors	6	6^{2}	7	6
2	(Czechoslovakia) Ivan Lendl	3	7^{7}	5	0

=== Section 1 ===
First round
1	(United States) McEnroe	6	5	4	6	6
(United States) Waltke	3	7	6	0	1
(United States) Smith	6	3	5
Q	(United States) Sadri	7	6	7
Q	(Austria) Feigl	6	6	6
(France) Courteau	1	2	2
(France) Roger-Vasselin	0	6	7	4	2
(United States) Van Patten	6	1	5	6	6
(United States) Wittus	1	2	2
(Australia) Cash	6	6	6
(Australia) Fitzgerald	4	7	7	1	4
(Canada) Michibata	6	5	6	6	6
Q	(United States) Andrews	7	6	5	1	4
(New Zealand) Lewis	6	3	7	6	6
(Sweden) Sundström	6	5	2	2
16	(United States) Scanlon	4	7	6	6

Second round
1	(United States) McEnroe	6	6	6
Q	(United States) Sadri	0	1	4
Q	(Austria) Feigl	2	6	6	2	1
(United States) Van Patten	6	2	4	6	6
(Australia) Cash	6	1	7	6
(Canada) Michibata	4	6	6	4
(New Zealand) Lewis	3	3	3
16	(United States) Scanlon	6	6	6

Third round
1	(United States) McEnroe	6	6	6
(United States) Van Patten	1	2	1
(Australia) Cash	5	3	2
16	(United States) Scanlon	7	6	6

Fourth round
1	(United States) McEnroe	6^{2}	6^{2}	6	3
16	(United States) Scanlon	7^{7}	7^{7}	4	6

=== Section 2 ===
First round
10	(Spain) Higueras	6	6	6
(United States) Anger	4	4	2
(United Kingdom) Lloyd	6	3	6	6
(South Africa) Mitton	2	6	2	3
(United States) Moor	7	7	6
(Brazil) Soares	5	6	3
(Chile) Fillol, Sr.	6	2	6	2
(Australia) McNamee	2	6	7	6
(South Africa) Tarr	6	6	4	6
(United States) De Palmer	4	4	6	1
(United States) Mitchell	2	6	1
Q	(South Africa) Visser	6	7	6
(United States) Dickson	6	6	6
(Sweden) Simonsson	2	2	4
(United States) Purcell	6	6	6
Q	(United States) Druz	3	2	1

Second round
10	(Spain) Higueras	3	4	5
(United Kingdom) Lloyd	6	6	7
(United States) Moor	6	3	4	6	7
(Australia) McNamee	4	6	6	3	5
(South Africa) Tarr	6	1	5
Q	(South Africa) Visser	7	6	7
(United States) Dickson	6	6	6
(United States) Purcell	3	2	4

Third round
(United Kingdom) Lloyd	6	5	2	6	6
(United States) Moor	3	7	6	0	1
Q	(South Africa) Visser	3	4	4
(United States) Dickson	6	6	6

Fourth round
(United Kingdom) Lloyd	7	6	0	6
(United States) Dickson	6	7	6	7

=== Section 3 ===
First round
3	(United States) Connors	6	6	3	6
(India) Krishnan	2	4	6	2
(Sweden) Högstedt	6	6	6	7
(Paraguay) González	3	4	7	6
(Czechoslovakia) Šmid	3	6	6	6
(United States) Borowiak	6	1	4	2
(United States) Manson	4	7	7	4	7
(United States) Kleege	6	6	6	6	6
(United States) Fromm	6	7	1	6
(Peru) Arraya	4	6	6	4
(United States) Stockton	3	6	6
(Switzerland) Günthardt	6	7	7
Q	(South Africa) Steyn	6	6	5	6
(United States) Freeman	2	3	7	2
(United States) Doyle	3	3	4
11	(United States) Mayer	6	6	6

Second round
3	(United States) Connors	6	6	6
(Sweden) Högstedt	1	2	3
(Czechoslovakia) Šmid	3	6	5	6	4
(United States) Manson	6	3	7	3	6
(United States) Fromm	2	4	6	4
(Switzerland) Günthardt	6	6	4	6
Q	(South Africa) Steyn	6	1	6	4	2
11	(United States) Mayer	3	6	2	6	6

Third round
3	(United States) Connors	6	6	6
(United States) Manson	0	4	0
(Switzerland) Günthardt	6	6	6
11	(United States) Mayer	1	0	0

Fourth round
3	(United States) Connors	7	6	6
(Switzerland) Günthardt	5	4	1

=== Section 4 ===
First round
14	(United States) Teltscher	6	6	6
(Australia) McCurdy	0	4	4
(United States) Giammalva, Jr.	7	6	6
(United States) Lapidus	5	4	4
Q	(United States) Meister	7	2	6	7
(United States) Winitsky	6	6	3	5
(United States) Giammalva	1	5	6
(Sweden) Järryd	6	7	7
(United States) Holmes	6	6	3	6
(United States) Lutz	3	4	6	0
(Sweden) Simonsson	4	4	6	6	6
(Brazil) Góes	6	6	4	1	4
(United States) Cain	6	7	6
(United States) Bauer	4	5	3
Q	(South Africa) Edwards	2	2	2
6	(Argentina) Vilas	6	6	6

Second round
14	(United States) Teltscher	6	6	5	4	6
(United States) Giammalva, Jr.	2	3	7	6	2
Q	(United States) Meister	4	7	4	7	3
(Sweden) Järryd	6	6	6	5	6
(United States) Holmes	6	6	6
(Sweden) Simonsson	2	1	3
(United States) Cain	7	3	3	6	2
6	(Argentina) Vilas	6	6	6	2	6

Third round
14	(United States) Teltscher	6	6	6	6
(Sweden) Järryd	7	3	2	4
(United States) Holmes	6	6	6
6	(Argentina) Vilas	2	2	3

Fourth round
14	(United States) Teltscher	3	6	6	6
(United States) Holmes	6	1	2	1

=== Section 5 ===
First round
8	(Argentina) Clerc	2	3	6
(United States) Wilkison	6	6	7
(Australia) Warwick	2	6	6	4	6
(United States) Gilbert	6	1	3	6	1
Q	(United States) Davis	5	5	2
(Sweden) Nyström	7	7	6
(United States) Saviano	3	0	6
(Brazil) Kirmayr	6	6	7
(United States) Harmon	4	6	4	6	6
Q	(United States) Austin	6	4	6	2	2
(Italy) Ocleppo	6	7	7
(United States) DuPré	3	6	6
(Italy) Panatta	3	3	2
(United States) Gullikson	6	6	6
Q	(United States) Canter	2	3	6	2
9	(United States) Arias	6	6	0	6

Second round
(United States) Wilkison	3	5	2
(Australia) Warwick	6	7	6
(Sweden) Nyström	6	6	6
(Brazil) Kirmayr	1	3	2
(United States) Harmon	3	2	4
(Italy) Ocleppo	6	6	6
(United States) Gullikson	6	3	6^{1}	6^{7}
9	(United States) Arias	3	6	7^{7}	7^{9}

Third round
(Australia) Warwick	0	3	3
(Sweden) Nyström	6	6	6
(Italy) Ocleppo	6^{6}	1	2
9	(United States) Arias	7^{8}	6	6

Fourth round
(Sweden) Nyström	6	3	6	0	0
9	(United States) Arias	3	6	3	6	6

=== Section 6 ===
First round
15	(United States) Gerulaitis	3	3	6	7	6
(Brazil) Hocevar	6	6	2	5	4
(United States) Buehning	3	6	6	6	2
(United States) Hooper	6	3	7	0	0r
(United States) Gurfein	2	3	6	7	2
(United States) Lipton	6	6	3	5	6
(United States) Krickstein	6	6	3	4	7
(Sweden) Edberg	3	2	6	6	6
(United States) Gullikson	6	3	6	2	4
(Czechoslovakia) Pimek	4	6	2	6	6
(United States) Teacher	3	6	0	4
(United States) Korita	6	4	6	6
Q	(France) Vanier	6	6	6
(United States) Van't Hof	3	1	1
(United States) Davis	1	6	6	4
4	(France) Noah	6	3	7	6

Second round
15	(United States) Gerulaitis	3	6	7	6
(United States) Buehning	6	1	6	2
(United States) Lipton	3	1	2
(United States) Krickstein	6	6	6
(Czechoslovakia) Pimek	4	6	2
(United States) Korita	6	7	6
Q	(France) Vanier	4	4	4
4	(France) Noah	6	6	6

Third round
15	(United States) Gerulaitis	6	6	4	3	4
(United States) Krickstein	3	3	6	6	6
(United States) Korita	7	3	3	4
4	(France) Noah	5	6	6	6

Fourth round
(United States) Krickstein	3	6	3
4	(France) Noah	6	7	6

=== Section 7 ===
First round
5	(Sweden) Wilander	3	6	6	6
(France) Forget	6	1	2	2
(United States) Mayotte	6	6	5	2
(United States) Gottfried	7	2	7	6
Q	(United States) Nelson	4	6	3	2
(Chile) Acuña	6	1	6	6
Q	(United States) Seguso	6	6	7
(United States) Leach	3	4	6
(Ecuador) Gómez	6	6	6
(United States) Gitlin	4	1	2
(France) Moretton	7	6	7
Q	(United States) Pate	6	4	6
(Australia) Drewett	7	4	6	5	6
(France) Tulasne	6	6	4	7	3
Q	(United States) Gandolfo	6	4	4
13	(United States) Denton	7	6	6

Second round
5	(Sweden) Wilander	6	6	7
(United States) Gottfried	3	4	6
(Chile) Acuña	6	6	6
Q	(United States) Seguso	1	3	2
(Ecuador) Gómez	5	3	7	7	6
(France) Moretton	7	6	5	5	3
(Australia) Drewett	2	6	3	4
13	(United States) Denton	6	3	6	6

Third round
5	(Sweden) Wilander	6	7	6
(Chile) Acuña	4	5	1
(Ecuador) Gómez	6	6	6
13	(United States) Denton	3	4	4

Fourth round
5	(Sweden) Wilander	6	6	6
(Ecuador) Gómez	2	1	2

=== Section 8 ===
First round
12	(United States) Kriek	5	7	7	6
(United States) Solomon	7	5	5	4
(Nigeria) Odizor	7	1	1	6	6
(United States) Bourne	6	6	6	4	7
(Brazil) Motta	6	6	3	4	4
(United States) Mayer	4	3	6	6	6
(United States) Tanner	7	7	6
(United States) Brown	6	6	1
(Romania) Năstase	6	4	6	6	6
(United States) Fleming	7	6	2	2	7
(United States) Amaya	6	2	3	1
(United States) Levine	4	6	6	6
(Israel) Glickstein	4	2	7	6	6
(West Germany) Westphal	6	6	6	1	0
(Romania) Segărceanu	2	0	2
2	(Czechoslovakia) Lendl	6	6	6

Second round
12	(United States) Kriek	6	6	3	2	6
(United States) Bourne	4	1	6	6	1
(United States) Mayer	6	4	6	6	6
(United States) Tanner	7	6	2	3	7
(United States) Fleming	5	7	1	6	1
(United States) Levine	7	6	6	2	6
(Israel) Glickstein	1	1	2
2	(Czechoslovakia) Lendl	6	6	6

Third round
12	(United States) Kriek	6	3	7	7	7
(United States) Tanner	7	6	6	6	6
(United States) Levine	2	2	2
2	(Czechoslovakia) Lendl	6	6	6

Fourth round
12	(United States) Kriek	2	4	1
2	(Czechoslovakia) Lendl	6	6	6

Preceded by 1983 Wimbledon Championships – Men's singles	Grand Slam men's singles	Succeeded by 1983 Australian Open – Men's singles
