= 1983 US Open – Women's doubles =

Women's doubles
- 1983 US Open

Final
- Champions: (United States) Martina Navratilova (United States) Pam Shriver
- Runners-up: (South Africa) Rosalyn Fairbank (United States) Candy Reynolds
- Score: 6–7^{(4–7)}, 6–1, 6–3

Details
- Draw: 64
- Seeds: 16

Events
Singles	men	women		boys	girls
Doubles	men	women	mixed	boys	girls
WC Singles	men	women	quad
WC Doubles	men	women	quad
Legends	men	women	mixed
← 1982 ·	US Open	· 1984 →

Rosemary Casals and Wendy Turnbull were the defending champions but lost in the quarterfinals to Mima Jaušovec and Kathy Jordan.

Martina Navratilova and Pam Shriver won in the final 6–7^{(4–7)}, 6–1, 6–3 against Rosalyn Fairbank and Candy Reynolds.

== Seeds ==
Champion seeds are indicated in bold text while text in italics indicates the round in which those seeds were eliminated.

1. (United States) **Martina Navratilova** / (United States) **Pam Shriver (champions)**
2. (South Africa) Rosalyn Fairbank / (United States) Candy Reynolds (final)
3. n/a
4. (United States) Rosemary Casals / (Australia) Wendy Turnbull (quarterfinals)
5. (United States) Billie Jean King / (United States) Sharon Walsh (semifinals)
6. (Socialist Federal Republic of Yugoslavia) Mima Jaušovec / (United States) Kathy Jordan (semifinals)
7. (United Kingdom) Anne Hobbs / (United States) Andrea Jaeger (quarterfinals)
8. (United Kingdom) Jo Durie / (United States) Ann Kiyomura (second round)
9. (United States) Lea Antonoplis / (United States) Barbara Jordan (second round)
10. (United States) Elise Burgin / (United States) JoAnne Russell (quarterfinals)
11. (Czechoslovakia) Hana Mandlíková / (United States) Betsy Nagelsen (second round)
12. (Australia) Dianne Balestrat / (Netherlands) Betty Stöve (first round)
13. (United States) Kathleen Horvath / (South Africa) Yvonne Vermaak (first round)
14. (United States) Anna-Maria Fernandez / (United States) Beth Norton (first round)
15. (Canada) Carling Bassett / (Argentina) Ivanna Madruga-Osses (third round)
16. (United States) Andrea Leand / (United States) Mary-Lou Piatek (second round)

== Draw ==
=== Key ===
- Q = Qualifier
- WC = Wild card
- LL = Lucky loser
- Alt = Alternate
- SE = Special exempt
- PR = Protected ranking
- ITF = ITF entry
- JE = Junior exempt
- w/o = Walkover
- r = Retired
- d = Defaulted
- SR = Special ranking

=== Finals ===
Semifinals
1	(United States) **Martina Navratilova** (United States) **Pam Shriver**	**6**	**6**
6	(Socialist Federal Republic of Yugoslavia) Mima Jaušovec (United States) Kathy Jordan	3	2
5	(United States) Billie Jean King (United States) Sharon Walsh	6	**6**	5
2	(South Africa) **Rosalyn Fairbank** (United States) **Candy Reynolds**	**7**	2	**7**

Final
1	(United States) **Martina Navratilova** (United States) **Pam Shriver**	6^{4}	**6**	**6**
2	(South Africa) Rosalyn Fairbank (United States) Candy Reynolds	**7^{7}**	1	3

=== Top half ===
==== Section 1 ====
First round
1	(United States) **M Navratilova** (United States) **P Shriver**	**6**	**6**
(United States) T Phelps (United States) S Solomon	1	1
(Czechoslovakia) Y Brzáková (Czechoslovakia) K Skronská	2	2
(United States) **T Holladay** (United States) **K O'Brien**	**6**	**6**
(South Korea) **D-H Lee** (Romania) **L Romanov**	**6**	**7**
(United States) J Filkoff (United States) S McInerney	2	5
(Australia) C O'Neil (Australia) P Whytcross	2	5
15	(Canada) **C Bassett** (Argentina) **I Madruga-Osses**	**6**	**7**
9	(United States) **L Antonoplis** (United States) **B Jordan**	**6**	**6**
(United States) P Casale (Italy) R Reggi	3	0
(United States) **S Collins** (United States) **Z Garrison**	**7**	**6**
(United States) L duPont (Bulgaria) M Maleeva	5	3
(South Africa) **I Kloss** (United States) **H Ludloff**	**7**	**6**
(United States) D Gilbert (Hong Kong) P Hy	5	0
(Australia) B Remilton (Japan) N Sato	2	**6**	0
7	(United Kingdom) **A Hobbs** (United States) **A Jaeger**	**6**	4	**6**

Second round
1	(United States) **M Navratilova** (United States) **P Shriver**	**6**	1	**6**
(United States) T Holladay (United States) K O'Brien	1	**6**	2
(South Korea) D-H Lee (Romania) L Romanov	6	3
15	(Canada) **C Bassett** (Argentina) **I Madruga-Osses**	**7**	**6**
9	(United States) L Antonoplis (United States) B Jordan	4	2
(United States) **S Collins** (United States) **Z Garrison**	**6**	**6**
(South Africa) I Kloss (United States) H Ludloff	4	**6**	0
7	(United Kingdom) **A Hobbs** (United States) **A Jaeger**	**6**	2	**6**

Third round
1	(United States) **M Navratilova** (United States) **P Shriver**	**6**	**6**
15	(Canada) C Bassett (Argentina) I Madruga-Osses	2	2
(United States) S Collins (United States) Z Garrison	2	2
7	(United Kingdom) **A Hobbs** (United States) **A Jaeger**	**6**	**6**

Quarterfinals
1	(United States) **M Navratilova** (United States) **P Shriver**	**6**	**6**
7	(United Kingdom) A Hobbs (United States) A Jaeger	3	3

==== Section 2 ====
First round
4	(United States) **R Casals** (Australia) **W Turnbull**	**6**	**6**
(United States) J Goodling (Australia) N Gregory	3	1
(United States) C Benjamin (France) C Vanier	1	4
(Czechoslovakia) **I Budařová** (Czechoslovakia) **M Skuherská**	**6**	**6**
(Italy) S Simmonds (United States) N Yeargin	2	5
(France) **P Paradis** (France) **C Suire**	**6**	**7**
(United States) **Le Allen** (Australia) **E Sayers**	**7**	**6**
14	(United States) A M Fernandez (United States) B Norton	5	2
12	(Australia) D Balestrat (Netherlands) B Stöve	1	**7**	6
(United States) **A Moulton** (United States) **P Smith**	**6**	6	**7**
(Australia) **S Leo** (Brazil) **C Monteiro**	**6**	**6**
(United Kingdom) S Gomer (United Kingdom) J Salmon	2	1
(United States) **K Shaefer** (United States) **P Teeguarden**	**6**	**6**
(United States) H Crowe (United States) F Raschiatore	3	1
(United States) P Barg (United States) B Herr	2	3
6	(Socialist Federal Republic of Yugoslavia) **M Jaušovec** (United States) **K Jordan**	**6**	**6**

Second round
4	(United States) **R Casals** (Australia) **W Turnbull**	**6**	**6**
(Czechoslovakia) I Budařová (Czechoslovakia) M Skuherská	2	1
(France) P Paradis (France) C Suire	5	2
(United States) **Le Allen** (Australia) **E Sayers**	**7**	**6**
(United States) **A Moulton** (United States) **P Smith**	**6**	**7**
(Australia) S Leo (Brazil) C Monteiro	2	6
(United States) K Shaefer (United States) P Teeguarden	6	2
6	(Socialist Federal Republic of Yugoslavia) **M Jaušovec** (United States) **K Jordan**	**7**	**6**

Third round
4	(United States) **R Casals** (Australia) **W Turnbull**	3	**6**	**6**
(United States) Le Allen (Australia) E Sayers	**6**	1	1
(United States) A Moulton (United States) P Smith	3	3
6	(Socialist Federal Republic of Yugoslavia) **M Jaušovec** (United States) **K Jordan**	**6**	**6**

Quarterfinals
4	(United States) R Casals (Australia) W Turnbull	0	3
6	(Socialist Federal Republic of Yugoslavia) **M Jaušovec** (United States) **K Jordan**	**6**	**6**

=== Bottom half ===
==== Section 3 ====
First round
5	(United States) **B J King** (United States) **S Walsh**	**6**	**6**
(Australia) A Minter (Australia) E Minter	1	3
(United States) M Norwood (United States) S Russo	1	2
(Soviet Union) **S Cherneva** (Soviet Union) **L Savchenko**	**6**	**6**
(United States) **Lo Allen** (United States) **G Rush**	**7**	**6**
(Poland) I Kuczyńska (New Zealand) C Newton	5	2
(United States) H Manset (United States) T Mochizuki	3	2
11	(Czechoslovakia) **H Mandlíková** (United States) **B Nagelsen**	**6**	**6**
13	(United States) K Horvath (South Africa) Y Vermaak	**7**	3	3
(Hungary) **A Temesvári** (United Kingdom) **V Wade**	6	**6**	**6**
(United States) L Bonder (United States) K Sands	3	4
(United States) **J Klitch** (West Germany) **R Tomanová**	**6**	**6**
(South Africa) J Mundel (South Africa) R Uys	3	1
(United States) **B Gadusek** (United States) **W White**	**6**	**6**
(United States) **P Fendick** (Canada) **J Hetherington**	**6**	**6**
ALT	(United States) J Harrington (Japan) E Inoue	2	2

Second round
5	(United States) **B J King** (United States) **S Walsh**	**6**	**6**
(Soviet Union) S Cherneva (Soviet Union) L Savchenko	3	3
(United States) **Lo Allen** (United States) **G Rush**	**6**	**6**
11	(Czechoslovakia) H Mandlíková (United States) B Nagelsen	3	3
(Hungary) **A Temesvári** (United Kingdom) **V Wade**	**6**	**6**
(United States) J Klitch (West Germany) R Tomanová	4	2
(United States) **B Gadusek** (United States) **W White**	**6**	6	**6**
(United States) P Fendick (Canada) J Hetherington	1	**7**	4

Third round
5	(United States) **B J King** (United States) **S Walsh**	**6**	**6**
(United States) Lo Allen (United States) G Rush	3	2
(Hungary) A Temesvári (United Kingdom) V Wade	**6**	4	2
(United States) **B Gadusek** (United States) **W White**	2	**6**	**6**

Quarterfinals
5	(United States) **B J King** (United States) **S Walsh**	**6**	**6**
(United States) B Gadusek (United States) W White	1	1

==== Section 4 ====
First round
8	(United Kingdom) **J Durie** (United States) **A Kiyomura**	**6**	**6**
(United States) B Hallquist (United States) A White	4	2
(United States) **S Acker** (United States) **L Forood**	**7**	**6**
(United States) S Mascarin (United States) K Rinaldi	5	1
(Peru) **L Arraya** (Argentina) **E Raponi-Longo**	4	**6**	**6**
(Chile) G Ohaco (Spain) C Perea	**6**	1	2
(United States) V Nelson (Peru) P Vásquez	4	2
10	(United States) **E Burgin** (United States) **J Russell**	**6**	**6**
16	(United States) **A Leand** (United States) **M L Piatek**	**6**	**6**
(United States) B Bruning (United States) B Buckley	0	1
(United States) A Holton (United States) K Holton	2	**7**	5
(Switzerland) **P Delhees** (Brazil) **P Medrado**	**6**	5	**7**
(United States) **J Davis** (United States) **A Henricksson**	**6**	**7**
(Sweden) C Jexell (Sweden) L Sandin	2	6
(United States) L Gordon (United States) S Gordon	3	0
2	(South Africa) **R Fairbank** (United States) **C Reynolds**	**6**	**6**

Second round
8	(United Kingdom) J Durie (United States) A Kiyomura	4	4
(United States) **S Acker** (United States) **L Forood**	**6**	**6**
(Peru) L Arraya (Argentina) E Raponi-Longo	4	4
10	(United States) **E Burgin** (United States) **J Russell**	**6**	**6**
16	(United States) A Leand (United States) M L Piatek	**6**	3	4
(Switzerland) **P Delhees** (Brazil) **P Medrado**	4	**6**	**6**
(United States) J Davis (United States) A Henricksson	2	5
2	(South Africa) **R Fairbank** (United States) **C Reynolds**	**6**	**7**

Third round
(United States) S Acker (United States) L Forood	5	**6**	1
10	(United States) **E Burgin** (United States) **J Russell**	**7**	4	**6**
(Switzerland) P Delhees (Brazil) P Medrado	1	1
2	(South Africa) **R Fairbank** (United States) **C Reynolds**	**6**	**6**

Quarterfinals
10	(United States) E Burgin (United States) J Russell	4	**6**	5
2	(South Africa) **R Fairbank** (United States) **C Reynolds**	**6**	2	**7**
