= Phyllis Blackwell =

American former professional tennis player

- Country (sports): United States
- Born: March 26, 1957 (age 68)
- Prize money: US$ 18,927

Singles

Grand Slam singles results
- US Open: 1R (1983)

Phyllis Blackwell (born 26 March 1957) is an American former professional tennis player.

Blackwell was raised in Mobile, Alabama and played college tennis for the University of Tennessee at Chattanooga, where she is a member of the Hall of Fame.

Her best performance on the WTA Tour was a semi-final appearance at the Borden Classic in Tokyo in 1982.

In 1983 she was eliminated in the third and final US Open qualifying round for the second successive year, but reached the main draw as a lucky loser, replacing an injured Tracy Austin. She was beaten in the first round by Yvonne Vermaak of South Africa, in an evening match on Grandstand Court.
