= Ann Hulbert =

American tennis player (born 1965)

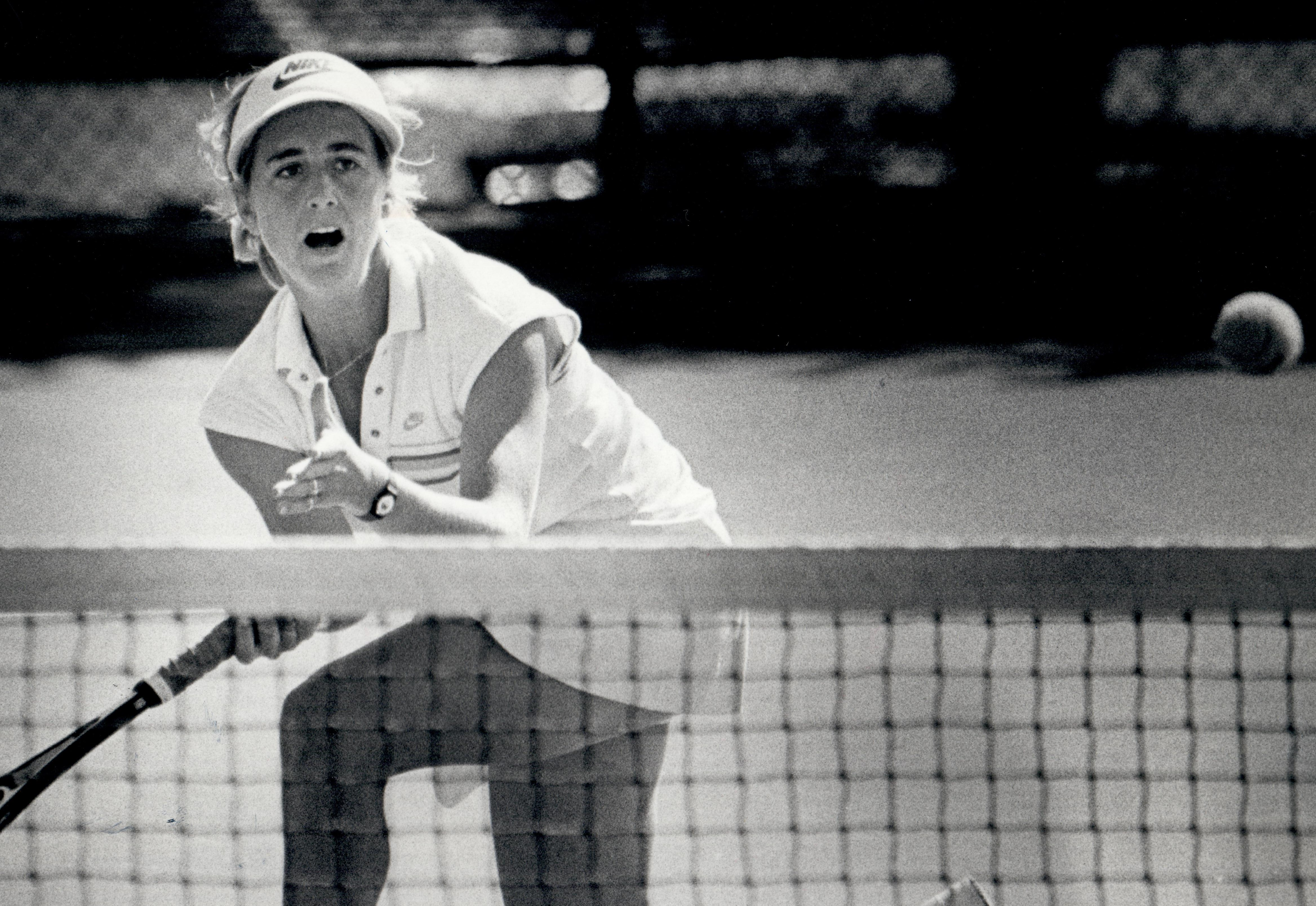
- Ann Hulbert, Trinity U. vs. Northwestern U., March 20, 1986
- Full name: Ann Elizabeth Hulbert
- Born: October 28, 1965 (age 60) Houston, Texas, United States
- Plays: Right-handed

Grand Slam singles results
- Wimbledon: 2R (1985)
- US Open: 2R (1983)
Medal record
Representing United States
Summer Universiade
Bronze medal – third place	1985 Kobe	Women's doubles

Ann Elizabeth Hopper (née Hulbert; born October 28, 1965) is a retired American tennis player. In 1982, she captured the Canadian Junior Open singles championship and reached the doubles finals of the Italian Junior Open and the girls draw at the US Open. In 1983 she won the girls' doubles title at the U.S. Open, and the United States Tennis Association MCB Award for sportsmanship on and off the court. Hulbert was a member of the U.S. Junior Wightman Cup Team in 1982 and 1983 and was a member of the 1984 and 1985 U.S. Junior Federation Cup Teams.

In 1984, Hulbert earned All-American honors in singles and doubles at SMU and reached the semi-finals of the NCAA Div 1 National Championships in singles. In 1986 and 1988, Hulbert earned All-American honors in doubles at Trinity University and in 1986 reached the finals of the NCAA National Championships in doubles with Gretchen Rush. With Rush, she also won the bronze medal at the 1985 World University Games in Kobe, Japan. Hulbert's collegiate career was capped by receiving the Arthur Ashe Award for Leadership and Sportsmanship from the Intercollegiate Tennis Association.

During her years in college Hulbert competed part-time as an amateur on the WTA tour finishing inside the top 200 for the years 1983–1985.
