= Sean Brawley =

American tennis player

- Full name: Sean Brawley
- Country (sports): United States
- Born: October 14, 1960 (age 64); New Orleans, Louisiana
- Plays: Right-handed

Singles
- Career record: 4–7
- Highest ranking: No. 148 (January 2, 1984)

Grand Slam singles results
- US Open: 1R (1982)

Doubles
- Career record: 7–20
- Highest ranking: No. 137 (July 9, 1984)

Grand Slam doubles results
- Australian Open: 1R (1982, 1983)
- French Open: 1R (1984)
- US Open: 2R (1983, 1984)

Sean Brawley (born October 14, 1960) is a former professional tennis player from the United States.

== Biography ==
Brawley was born in New Orleans, moving with his family to Thousand Oaks, California, where he grew up and started playing tennis. He was ranked in the Top Ten in both the Boy's 16's and 18's and won the National Boy's 16's Doubles title with David Siegler. He eventually earned a full scholarship to the University of Southern California, where he achieved All-American status and played co-#1 Singles and Doubles his senior year.

A right-handed player, Brawley achieved a career high ATP Tour world ranking of No. 143 in singles and No. 137 in doubles. In 1982, he qualified and lost in the first round at the US Open to Henrik Sundstrom from Sweden. He played in the main draw of the men's doubles at the three other grand slam events and twice reached the second round of the US Open partnering in 1981 with Ernesto Fernandez and in 1983 with Howard Sands.

He won a Challenger doubles title at Tarragona in 1982 partnering Christo Steyn.

His best year on the Grand Prix circuit came in 1983 when he beat Hans-Peter Kandler and Mike Gandolfo to make the singles quarter-finals at Ferrara, as well as reaching three doubles quarter-finals, in Adelaide, Boston and Toulouse.

In 1993, Brawley met Tim Gallwey, author of The Inner Game of Tennis and other Inner Game books, and was mentored by him for 5 years learning the Inner Game approach to learning, performance and coaching. They worked on numerous projects together for the next 15 years and Brawley helped Gallwey revise TIGOT in 1997. Brawley eventually became the first certified Inner Game coach in the world.

In 1994, Brawley won the USPTA National Singles title.

Brawley is now a high performance coach at Spencer Stuart in Stamford, CT, in their Leadership Advisory practice, working with CEO's and senior leaders to improve their performance in a meaningful way.

He has worked in the past with numerous well-known sports teams as well. When NFL coach Pete Carroll was at USC he hired Brawley as his Coach Advisor and he served as the team's primary mental performance coach for 9 years. He also worked with the New York Yankee Player Development group, the USTA Player Development program, San Diego Padres, Seattle Mariners and numerous college teams.

== Challenger titles ==
=== Doubles: (1) ===
| No. | Year | Tournament | Surface | Partner | Opponents | Score |
|---|---|---|---|---|---|---|
| 1. | 1982 | Tarragona, Spain | Clay | (South Africa) Christo Steyn | (Spain) Francisco Ferrer (Argentina) Martín Jaite | 6–3, 6–0 |
