= Rodney Crowley (tennis) =

American tennis player

- Full name: Thomas Rodney Crowley Jr.
- Country (sports): United States
- Born: September 22, 1958
- Died: May 22, 1991 (aged 32)
- Plays: Ambidextrous

Singles
- Career record: 0–1
- Highest ranking: No. 369 (January 3, 1983)

Doubles
- Career record: 12–23
- Highest ranking: No. 89 (January 2, 1984)

Grand Slam doubles results
- Australian Open: 1R (1982)
- French Open: 2R (1983)
- Wimbledon: 1R (1982)
- US Open: 3R (1983)

Thomas Rodney Crowley Jr. (September 22, 1958 – May 22, 1991) was an American professional tennis player.

Crowley was raised in New Jersey, the son of businessman Thomas Rodney Crowley Sr. His mother, Huguette, was a French national and met Thomas Sr when he was stationed in Algeria during the war.

From 1976 to 1980, Crowley was a collegiate tennis player for the University of Virginia and served a period as team captain. Unusually, he would play his ground stokes right-handed but served with his left hand.

Active on the professional tour during the 1980s, Crowley was most successful as a doubles player, appearing in the main draws of all four grand slam tournaments. He and regular doubles partner Rand Evett made the third round of the 1983 US Open. At the start of the 1984 season he was ranked 89 in the world for doubles.

Crowley died from brain cancer in 1991, at the age of 32. The University of Virginia's T. Rodney Crowley, Jr. Memorial Scholarship Fund was established in his honor and is awarded annually to a fourth year student.

== ATP Challenger finals ==
=== Doubles: 1 (0–1) ===
| Result | Date | Tournament | Surface | Partner | Opponents | Score |
|---|---|---|---|---|---|---|
| Loss | Apr 1983 | Ashkelon, Israel | Hard | (United States) Rand Evett | (Sweden) Stefan Svensson (Netherlands) Huub van Boeckel | 4–6, 6–4, 3–6 |
