= Danny Saltz =

American tennis player

- Country (sports): United States
- Residence: Newport Beach, California
- Born: July 30, 1961 (age 64); Chicago
- Height: 6 ft 4 in (1.93 m)
- Turned pro: 1983
- Plays: Right-handed

Singles
- Career record: 17–20
- Career titles: 1
- Highest ranking: No. 122 (July 16, 1984)

Grand Slam singles results
- Australian Open: 2R (1987)
- US Open: 1R (1981, 1984)

Doubles
- Career record: 13–24
- Career titles: 0
- Highest ranking: No. 128 (August 20, 1984)

Grand Slam doubles results
- Australian Open: 2R (1984)
- US Open: 1R (1984)

Danny Saltz (born July 30, 1961) is a former professional tennis player from the United States.

== Career ==
Saltz played collegiate tennis for the University of California, Los Angeles.

His first Grand Slam appearance was at the 1981 US Open, where he lost in a straight sets loss to Bruce Manson, in a match which lasted just 20 games. He fared better when he returned to the US Open in 1984, claiming the first two sets against Todd Nelson, but he was unable to win the match. The American also lost in the opening round of the 1984 Australian Open, to Eddie Edwards of South Africa. He managed to register a win at the 1987 Australian Open, beating Patrik Kühnen. In the second round he faced world number one Ivan Lendl and lost in four sets.

At Auckland in 1984, Saltz became the eighth player to win a Grand Prix tournament as a qualifier when he defeated Chip Hooper in the Benson and Hedges Open final. With a ranking of no. 390 he was at the time the lowest ranked player to win a Grand Prix tournament. Saltz was a semifinalist at the same event the following year.

== Grand Prix career finals ==
=== Singles: 1 (1–0) ===
Outcome	No.	Date	Tournament	Surface	Opponent	Score
Winner	1.	1984	Auckland, New Zealand	Hard	(United States) Chip Hooper	4–6, 6–3, 6–4, 6–4

== Official links ==
- Player Profile and Stats on ATP Tour
