= 1983 US Open – Women's singles =

Women's singles
- 1983 US Open

Final
- Champion: (United States) Martina Navratilova
- Runner-up: (United States) Chris Evert
- Score: 6–1, 6–3

Details
- Draw: 128
- Seeds: 16

Events
Singles	men	women		boys	girls
Doubles	men	women	mixed	boys	girls
WC Singles	men	women	quad
WC Doubles	men	women	quad
Legends	men	women	mixed
← 1982 ·	US Open	· 1984 →

Martina Navratilova defeated defending champion Chris Evert in the final, 6–1, 6–3 to win the women's singles tennis title at the 1983 US Open. It was her first US Open singles title and seventh major singles title overall, completing the career Grand Slam in singles. Navratilova did not lose a set during the tournament.

== Seeds ==
The seeded players are listed below. Martina Navratilova is the champion; others show the round in which they were eliminated.

1. (United States) Martina Navratilova (champion)
2. (United States) Chris Evert (finalist)
3. (United States) Andrea Jaeger (quarterfinalist)
4. (United States) Tracy Austin (withdrew)
5. (United States) Pam Shriver (semifinalist)
6. (Australia) Wendy Turnbull (third round)
7. (West Germany) Sylvia Hanika (quarterfinalist)
8. (Czechoslovakia) Hana Mandlíková (quarterfinalist)
9. (Hungary) Andrea Temesvári (third round)
10. (United States) Zina Garrison (fourth round)
11. (United States) Barbara Potter (second round)
12. (United States) Kathy Rinaldi (second round)
13. (West Germany) Claudia Kohde-Kilsch (second round)
14. (United Kingdom) Jo Durie (semifinalist)
15. (Romania) Virginia Ruzici (first round)
16. (United States) Kathy Jordan (fourth round)

== Draw ==
=== Key ===
- Q = Qualifier
- WC = Wild card
- LL = Lucky loser
- Alt = Alternate
- ITF = ITF entry
- PR = Protected ranking
- SR = Special ranking
- SE = Special exempt
- JE = Junior exempt
- JR = Junior Accelerator Programme entrant
- CO = College Accelerator Programme entrant
- NG = Next Gen Accelerator Program entrant
- w/o = Walkover
- r = Retired
- d = Defaulted

=== Final eight ===
Quarterfinals
1	(United States) Martina Navratilova	6	6
7	(West Germany) Sylvia Hanika	0	3
3	(United States) Andrea Jaeger	6	3
5	(United States) Pam Shriver	7	6
(Argentina) Ivanna Madruga	2	2
14	(United Kingdom) Jo Durie	6	6
8	(Czechoslovakia) Hana Mandlíková	4	3
2	(United States) Chris Evert	6	6

Semifinals
1	(United States) Martina Navratilova	6	6
5	(United States) Pam Shriver	2	1
14	(United Kingdom) Jo Durie	4	4
2	(United States) Chris Evert	6	6

Finals
1	(United States) Martina Navratilova	6	6
2	(United States) Chris Evert	1	3

=== Earlier rounds ===
==== Section 1 ====
First round
1	(United States) Navratilova	6	6
(Argentina) Raponi-Longo	1	0
(United States) Allen	6	6
(United States) Kuhlman	2	2
(Italy) Reggi	7	5	6
(United States) Bowes	5	7	3
(United States) Gompert	6	3	6
(United States) Sands	4	6	1
(Italy) Simmonds	6	7
(Puerto Rico) Fernández	4	5
(Hong Kong) Hy	6	6
(United States) Fendick	4	4
(Peru) Vásquez	6	6	7
(United States) Jordan	1	7	6
(France) Tanvier	6	6
15	(Romania) Ruzici	3	3

Second round
1	(United States) Navratilova	6	6
(United States) Allen	2	1
(Italy) Reggi	3	1
(United States) Gompert	6	6
(Italy) Simmonds	3	1
(Hong Kong) Hy	6	6
(Peru) Vásquez	6	3	6
(France) Tanvier	3	6	1

Third round
1	(United States) Navratilova	6	6
(United States) Gompert	2	2
(Hong Kong) Hy	4	2
(Peru) Vásquez	6	6

Fourth round
1	(United States) Navratilova	6	6
(Peru) Vásquez	0	1

==== Section 2 ====
First round
9	(Hungary) Temesvári	6	7
(United States) Davis	3	6
(United Kingdom) Wade	6	6
(Switzerland) Jolissaint	3	1
(France) Paradis	6	3	6
(Australia) Balestrat	1	6	1
(Socialist Federal Republic of Yugoslavia) Goleš	3	6	7
(United Kingdom) Hobbs	6	1	5
(United States) Herr	6	6
(Switzerland) Drescher	3	0
Q	(United States) Kim	6	6
(United States) Mochizuki	3	1
(Peru) Arraya	6	6
(Australia) Minter	3	2
7	(West Germany) Hanika	6	5	6
Q	(Soviet Union) Savchenko	2	7	4

Second round
9	(Hungary) Temesvári	6	6
(United Kingdom) Wade	2	3
(France) Paradis	4	6	6
(Socialist Federal Republic of Yugoslavia) Goleš	6	2	1
(United States) Herr	2	7	0
Q	(United States) Kim	6	5	6
(Peru) Arraya	1	3
7	(West Germany) Hanika	6	6

Third round
9	(Hungary) Temesvári	4	0
(France) Paradis	6	6
Q	(United States) Kim	3	0
7	(West Germany) Hanika	6	6

Fourth round
(France) Paradis	4	1
7	(West Germany) Hanika	6	6

==== Section 3 ====
First round
3	(United States) Jaeger	6	6
(United States) Nagelsen	0	2
(United States) Burgin	6	6
(Sweden) Sandin	4	4
(Socialist Federal Republic of Yugoslavia) Jaušovec	6	6	6
(United States) Smith	7	0	2
(United States) Gilbert	6	6
(United States) Mascarin	2	4
(Czechoslovakia) Suková	1	6	6
(West Germany) Pfaff	6	3	4
(United States) Forood	7	1	6
(United States) Ludloff	6	6	2
(United States) Gadusek	7	6
(United States) Holton	6	3
13	(West Germany) Kohde-Kilsch	6	6
Q	(France) Calleja	2	2

Second round
3	(United States) Jaeger	6	6
(United States) Burgin	2	3
(Socialist Federal Republic of Yugoslavia) Jaušovec	6	6
(United States) Gilbert	4	2
(Czechoslovakia) Suková	6	6
(United States) Forood	1	3
(United States) Gadusek	5	6	6
13	(West Germany) Kohde-Kilsch	7	1	2

Third round
3	(United States) Jaeger	6	6	7
(Socialist Federal Republic of Yugoslavia) Jaušovec	2	7	6
(Czechoslovakia) Suková	2	6
(United States) Gadusek	6	7

Fourth round
3	(United States) Jaeger	4	6	6
(United States) Gadusek	6	2	1

==== Section 4 ====
First round
11	(United States) Potter	6	6
(United States) Norton	1	2
(United States) Bonder	6	6
(Czechoslovakia) Tomanová	0	6
(France) Suire	6	1	6
(United States) Latham	1	6	4
(Switzerland) Delhees	6	6
(Australia) Leo	4	4
(United States) Shaefer	6	6	6
Q	(United Kingdom) Croft	3	7	3
(Brazil) Monteiro	6	2	7
(United States) Fernandez	4	6	6
(United States) Hepner	6	6	6
Q	(United States) Bramblett	1	7	3
5	(United States) Shriver	6	6
(United States) duPont	0	3

Second round
11	(United States) Potter	5	7	6
(United States) Bonder	7	6	7
(France) Suire	6	7
(Switzerland) Delhees	3	5
(United States) Shaefer	7	6
(Brazil) Monteiro	5	2
(United States) Hepner	4	3
5	(United States) Shriver	6	6

Third round
(United States) Bonder	6	7
(France) Suire	2	5
(United States) Shaefer	0	6
5	(United States) Shriver	6	7

Fourth round
(United States) Bonder	2	2
5	(United States) Shriver	6	6

==== Section 5 ====
First round
6	(Australia) Turnbull	6	6
(United States) Walsh	3	3
(Czechoslovakia) Skuherská	6	6
(United States) Hallquist	4	3
(United States) Leand	6	6
(Netherlands) Mesker	2	4
(Czechoslovakia) Budařová	6	5	6
(United States) Collins	0	7	4
(United States) Steinmetz	6	6
(Socialist Federal Republic of Yugoslavia) Šašak	0	1
(United States) Teeguarden	4	7	6
(United States) Torres	6	6	3
(Argentina) Madruga	6	6
(Brazil) Medrado	4	2
12	(United States) Rinaldi	4	6	6
(United States) Nelson	6	4	3

Second round
6	(Australia) Turnbull	4	6	6
(Czechoslovakia) Skuherská	6	3	3
(United States) Leand	4	6	6
(Czechoslovakia) Budařová	6	3	4
(United States) Steinmetz	0	3
(United States) Teeguarden	6	6
(Argentina) Madruga	6	6
12	(United States) Rinaldi	4	3

Third round
6	(Australia) Turnbull	5	6	2
(United States) Leand	7	4	6
(United States) Teeguarden	6	1	1
(Argentina) Madruga	4	6	6

Fourth round
(United States) Leand	1	3
(Argentina) Madruga	6	6

==== Section 6 ====
First round
14	(United Kingdom) Durie	6	6
(South Africa) Fairbank	1	3
(Japan) Inoue	7	6
(Czechoslovakia) Skronská	5	2
Q	(United States) Bernstein	6	2	6
(Australia) Sayers	3	6	3
(United States) Phelps	7	6
(South Africa) Mundel	5	1
(United States) Casals	6	7
(France) Vanier	2	5
(United States) Harrington	1	6	7
(United States) Gerken	6	4	5
(United States) White	7	4	6
(Romania) Romanov	5	6	0
(South Africa) Vermaak	6	6
LL	(United States) Blackwell	4	1

Second round
14	(United Kingdom) Durie	7	6
(Japan) Inoue	5	3
Q	(United States) Bernstein	3	4
(United States) Phelps	6	6
(United States) Casals	6	6
(United States) Harrington	1	3
(United States) White	2	6	6
(South Africa) Vermaak	6	1	4

Third round
14	(United Kingdom) Durie	6	3	6
(United States) Phelps	4	6	2
(United States) Casals	2	5
(United States) White	6	7

Fourth round
14	(United Kingdom) Durie	6	6
(United States) White	3	0

==== Section 7 ====
First round
8	(Czechoslovakia) Mandlíková	6	6
(United States) Yeargin	0	3
(United States) Horvath	6	6
Q	(Austria) Huber	0	3
(United States) Cummings	6	7
(South Korea) Lee	1	6
(United States) Piatek	6	6
(United States) Acker	4	4
(Canada) Bassett	5	6	6
(United States) Antonoplis	7	1	3
(United States) Kiyomura	4	7	6
LL	(South Africa) Uys	6	6	1
(United States) Solomon	3	6	6
(United States) Casale	6	3	3
10	(United States) Garrison	7	6
(United States) Thompson	5	1

Second round
8	(Czechoslovakia) Mandlíková	7	7
(United States) Horvath	5	6
(United States) Cummings	7	0	6
(United States) Piatek	6	6	2
(Canada) Bassett	6	6
(United States) Kiyomura	3	1
(United States) Solomon	6	0	3
10	(United States) Garrison	4	6	6

Third round
8	(Czechoslovakia) Mandlíková	6	6
(United States) Cummings	0	1
(Canada) Bassett	4	3
10	(United States) Garrison	6	6

Fourth round
8	(Czechoslovakia) Mandlíková	6	7
10	(United States) Garrison	3	5

==== Section 8 ====
First round
16	(United States) Jordan	6	7
(United States) Benjamin	0	5
(United States) Louie	6	6
(United States) White	4	4
(United States) Russell	6	4	6
(Sweden) Jexell	4	6	4
(United States) Holladay	4	6	6
(United States) Henricksson	6	2	4
(United States) Rush	6	6	6
(United States) Klitch	3	7	3
(Bulgaria) Maleeva	6	6
(United States) Allen	4	1
(United States) Moulton	6	6
LL	(United States) Forman	4	1
2	(United States) Evert	6	6
Q	(United Kingdom) Walpole	1	0

Second round
16	(United States) Jordan	6	6
(United States) Louie	1	1
(United States) Russell	6	1
(United States) Holladay	7	6
(United States) Rush	3	0
(Bulgaria) Maleeva	6	6
(United States) Moulton	2	2
2	(United States) Evert	6	6

Third round
16	(United States) Jordan	6	3	6
(United States) Holladay	4	6	3
(Bulgaria) Maleeva	4	0
2	(United States) Evert	6	6

Fourth round
16	(United States) Jordan	3	6
2	(United States) Evert	6	7

== See also ==
- Evert–Navratilova rivalry

Preceded by 1983 Wimbledon Championships – Women's singles	Grand Slam women's singles	Succeeded by 1983 Australian Open – Women's singles
