= 1983 US Open (tennis) =

- Date: August 30 – September 11
- Edition: 103rd
- Category: Grand Slam (ITF)
- Surface: Hardcourt
- Location: New York City, New York, United States

Champions

Men's singles
- (United States) Jimmy Connors

Women's singles
- (United States) Martina Navratilova

Men's doubles
- (United States) Peter Fleming / (United States) John McEnroe

Women's doubles
- (United States) Martina Navratilova / (United States) Pam Shriver

Mixed doubles
- (Australia) Elizabeth Sayers / (Australia) John Fitzgerald

Boys' singles
- (Sweden) Stefan Edberg

Girls' singles
- (Australia) Elizabeth Minter

Boys' doubles
- (Australia) Mark Kratzmann / (Australia) Simon Youl

Girls' doubles
- (United States) Ann Hulbert / (Australia) Bernadette Randall
- US Open

The 1983 US Open was a tennis tournament played on outdoor hard courts at the USTA National Tennis Center in New York City in New York in the United States. It was the 103rd edition of the US Open and was held from August 30 to September 11, 1983.

The event was marred by the death of linesman Dick Wertheim from blunt cranial trauma after an errant serve by Stefan Edberg struck his groin, causing him to fall and hit his head.

== Seniors ==
=== Men's singles ===
(United States) Jimmy Connors defeated (Czechoslovakia) Ivan Lendl 6–3, 6–7^{(2–7)}, 7–5, 6–0

- It was Connors's 8th and last career Grand Slam title, his 5th US Open title and his 100th ATP single title.

=== Women's singles ===
(United States) Martina Navratilova defeated (United States) Chris Evert 6–1, 6–3

- It was Navratilova's 20th career Grand Slam title and her 1st US Open title.

=== Men's doubles ===
(United States) Peter Fleming / (United States) John McEnroe defeated (United States) Fritz Buehning / (United States) Van Winitsky 6–3, 6–4, 6–2

- It was Fleming's 6th career Grand Slam title and his 3rd and last US Open title. It was McEnroe's 12th career Grand Slam title and his 6th US Open title.

=== Women's doubles ===
(United States) Martina Navratilova / (United States) Pam Shriver defeated (South Africa) Rosalyn Fairbank / (United States) Candy Reynolds 6–7^{(4–7)}, 6–1, 6–3

- It was Navratilova's 21st career Grand Slam title and her 5th US Open title. It was Shriver's 5th career Grand Slam title and her 1st US Open title.

=== Mixed doubles ===
(Australia) Elizabeth Sayers / (Australia) John Fitzgerald defeated (United States) Barbara Potter / (United States) Ferdi Taygan 3–6, 6–3, 6–4

- It was Sayers' 1st career Grand Slam title and her 1st US Open title. It was Fitzgerald's 2nd career Grand Slam title and his 1st US Open title.

== Juniors ==
=== Boys' singles ===
(Sweden) Stefan Edberg defeated (Australia) Simon Youl 6–2, 6–4

=== Girls' singles ===
(Australia) Elizabeth Minter defeated (United States) Marianne Werdel 6–3, 7–5

=== Boys' doubles ===
(Australia) Mark Kratzmann / (Australia) Simon Youl defeated (United States) Patrick McEnroe / (United States) Brad Pearce 6–1, 7–6

=== Girls' doubles ===
(United States) Ann Hulbert / (Australia) Bernadette Randall defeated (Soviet Union) Natasha Reva / (Soviet Union) Larisa Savchenko 6–4, 6–2

| Preceded by 1983 Wimbledon Championships | Grand Slams | Succeeded by 1983 Australian Open |
