= 1983 Borden Classic – Doubles =

Doubles
- 1983 Borden Classic

Final
- Champions: (Australia) Chris O'Neil (Australia) Pam Whytcross
- Runners-up: (Australia) Brenda Remilton (Japan) Naoko Sato
- Score: 5–7, 7–6, 6–3

Details
- Draw: 16
- Seeds: 4

Events
Singles	Doubles
← 1982 ·	Borden Classic	· 1984 →

Brenda Remilton and Naoko Sato were the defending champions, but lost in the final to Chris O'Neil and Pam Whytcross. The score was 5–7, 7–6, 6–3.

== Seeds ==
1. (United States) Lisa Bonder / (United States) Susan Mascarin (first round)
2. (United States) Amy Holton / (United States) Kathy Holton (quarterfinals)
3. (United States) Julie Harrington / (Japan) Etsuko Inoue (semifinals)
4. (Australia) Brenda Remilton / (Japan) Naoko Sato (final)

== Draw ==
=== Key ===
- Q = Qualifier
- WC = Wild card
- LL = Lucky loser
- Alt = Alternate
- ITF = ITF entry
- PR = Protected ranking
- SR = Special ranking
- SE = Special exempt
- JE = Junior exempt
- JR = Junior Accelerator Programme entrant
- CO = College Accelerator Programme entrant
- NG = Next Gen Accelerator Program entrant
- w/o = Walkover
- r = Retired
- d = Defaulted

=== Draw ===
First round
1	(United States) L Bonder (United States) S Mascarin	4	2
(West Germany) A Betzner (West Germany) M Schropp	6	6
(United States) H Manset (United States) M Schillig	6	7
(Peru) L Arraya (United States) R Reis	4	5
4	(Australia) B Remilton (Japan) N Sato	6	6
(United States) Mary-Ann Colville (United States) Carol Watson	0	3
(United States) J Goodling (Chile) G Ohaco	3	1
(United States) P Barg (United States) H Crowe	6	6
(Japan) A Kijimuta (Japan) M Yanagi	6	6
(Netherlands) N Schutte (Switzerland) H Strachoňová	3	0
(United States) T Mochizuki (United States) K O'Brien	3	2
(Australia) C O'Neil (Australia) P Whytcross	6	6
3	(United States) J Harrington (Japan) E Inoue	6	6
(United States) C Copeland-Wilson (United States) S Solomon	4	0
(United States) D Gilbert (United States) S Margolin	6	1	3
2	(United States) A Holton (United States) Kathy Holton	3	6	6

Quarterfinals
(West Germany) A Betzner (West Germany) M Schropp	6	7
(United States) H Manset (United States) M Schillig	4	5
4	(Australia) B Remilton (Japan) N Sato	7	6
(United States) P Barg (United States) H Crowe	6	2
(Japan) A Kijimuta (Japan) M Yanagi	2	2
(Australia) C O'Neil (Australia) P Whytcross	6	6
3	(United States) J Harrington (Japan) E Inoue	4	7	6
2	(United States) A Holton (United States) K Holton	6	5	1

Semifinals
(West Germany) A Betzner (West Germany) M Schropp	1	1
4	(Australia) B Remilton (Japan) N Sato	6	6
(Australia) C O'Neil (Australia) P Whytcross	6	6
3	(United States) J Harrington (Japan) E Inoue	1	4

Final
4	(Australia) B Remilton (Japan) N Sato	7	6	3
(Australia) C O'Neil (Australia) P Whytcross	5	7	6
