= 1983 Borden Classic – Singles =

Singles
- 1983 Borden Classic

Final
- Champion: (United States) Lisa Bonder
- Runner-up: (Peru) Laura Arraya
- Score: 6–1, 6–3

Details
- Draw: 32 (4Q)
- Seeds: 8

Events
Singles	Doubles
← 1982 ·	Borden Classic	· 1984 →

Lisa Bonder successfully defended her title by defeating Laura Arraya 6–1, 6–3 in the final.

== Seeds ==
1. (United States) Lisa Bonder (champion)
2. (Peru) Laura Arraya (final)
3. (United States) Susan Mascarin (first round)
4. (Japan) Etsuko Inoue (semifinals)
5. (United States) Julie Harrington (second round)
6. (United States) Shelley Solomon (quarterfinals)
7. (United States) Amy Holton (second round)
8. (United States) Dana Gilbert (second round)

== Draw ==
=== Key ===
- Q = Qualifier
- WC = Wild card
- LL = Lucky loser
- Alt = Alternate
- ITF = ITF entry
- PR = Protected ranking
- SR = Special ranking
- SE = Special exempt
- JE = Junior exempt
- JR = Junior Accelerator Programme entrant
- CO = College Accelerator Programme entrant
- NG = Next Gen Accelerator Program entrant
- w/o = Walkover
- r = Retired
- d = Defaulted

=== Finals ===
Semifinals
1	(United States) Lisa Bonder	6	6
4	(Japan) Etsuko Inoue	2	3
(United States) Micki Schillig	4	5
2	(Peru) Laura Arraya	6	7

Final
1	(United States) Lisa Bonder	6	6
2	(Peru) Laura Arraya	1	3

=== Top half ===
First round
1	(United States) L Bonder	6	6
(Switzerland) H Strachoňová	3	1
(Netherlands) N Schutte	3	6	6
(United States) K O'Brien	6	3	2
(United States) S Margolin	6	6
(Australia) C O'Neil	3	2
(Japan) S Yonezawa	2	3
6	(United States) S Solomon	6	6
4	(Japan) E Inoue	6	6
(United States) H Manset	4	4
Q	(Japan) E Okagawa	3	2
Q	(United States) R Reis	6	6
(Australia) A Gulley	6	2	3
(Japan) K Okamoto	3	6	6
(United States) J Goodling	2	6	6
8	(United States) D Gilbert	6	3	7

Second round
1	(United States) L Bonder	7	6
(Netherlands) N Schutte	5	4
(United States) S Margolin	4	6	2
6	(United States) S Solomon	6	3	6
4	(Japan) E Inoue	6	6
Q	(United States) R Reis	3	0
(Japan) K Okamoto	6	2	6
8	(United States) D Gilbert	3	6	1

Quarterfinals
1	(United States) L Bonder	6	6
6	(United States) S Solomon	0	0
4	(Japan) E Inoue	4	6	6
(Japan) K Okamoto	6	2	0

Semifinals
1	(United States) L Bonder	6	6
4	(Japan) E Inoue	2	3

=== Bottom half ===
First round
5	(United States) J Harrington	6	0	6
(Australia) B Remilton	3	6	4
(United States) M Schillig	6	6
(West Germany) A Betzner	2	3
(West Germany) M Schropp	4	6	3
(Australia) P Whytcross	6	3	6
(Japan) M Yanagi	7	7
3	(United States) S Mascarin	5	6
7	(United States) A Holton	6	6
(West Germany) C Lechner	2	3
(United States) T Mochizuki	7	6	6
Q	(United States) Kathy Holton	5	7	3
(Japan) A Kijimuta	1	7	4
(Japan) N Sato	6	5	4
Q	(United States) P Barg	3	7	1
2	(Peru) L Arraya	6	6	6

Second round
5	(United States) J Harrington	3	6	6
(United States) M Schillig	6	3	7
(Australia) P Whytcross	6	4	4
(Japan) M Yanagi	2	6	6
7	(United States) A Holton	2	1
(United States) T Mochizuki	6	6
(Japan) A Kijimuta	5	3
2	(Peru) L Arraya	7	6

Quarterfinals
(United States) M Schillig	7	6
(Japan) M Yanagi	6	0
(United States) T Mochizuki	6	5	1
2	(Peru) L Arraya	3	7	6

Semifinals
(United States) M Schillig	4	5
2	(Peru) L Arraya	6	7
