= 1984 Borden Classic – Doubles =

Doubles
- 1984 Borden Classic

Final
- Champions: (Argentina) Mercedes Paz (United States) Ronni Reis
- Runners-up: (Argentina) Emilse Raponi Longo (Argentina) Adriana Villagrán
- Score: 6–4, 7–5

Details
- Draw: 16
- Seeds: 4

Events
Singles	Doubles
- Borden Classic

Chris O'Neil and Pam Whytcross were the defending champions, but O'Neil did not compete this year. Whytcross teamed up with Candy Reynolds and lost in the quarterfinals to Helena Manset and Micki Schillig.

Mercedes Paz and Ronni Reis won the title by defeating Emilse Raponi Longo and Adriana Villagrán 6–4, 7–5 in the final.

== Seeds ==
1. (United States) Candy Reynolds / (Australia) Pam Whytcross (quarterfinals)
2. (United States) Beth Herr / (Japan) Naoko Sato (first round)
3. (United States) Lisa Bonder / (Argentina) Gabriela Sabatini (first round)
4. (Argentina) Emilse Raponi Longo / (Argentina) Adriana Villagrán (final)

== Draw ==
Key

- Q = Qualifier
- WC = Wild card
- LL = Lucky loser
- Alt = Alternate
- ITF = ITF entry
- PR = Protected ranking
- SR = Special ranking
- SE = Special exempt
- JE = Junior exempt
- JR = Junior Accelerator Programme entrant
- CO = College Accelerator Programme entrant
- NG = Next Gen Accelerator Program entrant
- w/o = Walkover
- r = Retired
- d = Defaulted

=== Draw ===
First round
1	(United States) C Reynolds (Australia) P Whytcross	6	6
(United States) K McDonald (United States) D Rubin	4	1
(Canada) K Dewis (United States) S Solomon	1	2
(United States) H Manset (United States) M Schillig	6	6
4	(Argentina) E Raponi Longo (Argentina) A Villagrán	6	7
(New Zealand) B Perry (Japan) M Yanagi	3	6
(United States) B Bramblett (Japan) E Okagawa	4	2
(Australia) N Gregory (United States) T Mochizuki	6	6
(Argentina) M Paz (United States) R Reis	6	6
(United States) Lisa Barg (United States) J Forman	3	3
(Australia) A Gulley (Australia) A Tobin-Dingwall	6	6
3	(United States) L Bonder (Argentina) G Sabatini	1	3
(United States) S Foltz (United States) K Keil	6	1	6
(United States) A Holton (Chile) G Ohaco	4	6	3
(Switzerland) L Drescher (Japan) E Inoue	7	0	6
2	(United States) B Herr (Japan) N Sato	5	6	1

Quarterfinals
1	(United States) C Reynolds (Australia) P Whytcross	2	6	3
(United States) H Manset (United States) M Schillig	6	4	6
4	(Argentina) E Raponi Longo (Argentina) A Villagrán	6	7
(Australia) N Gregory (United States) T Mochizuki	4	5
(Argentina) M Paz (United States) R Reis	6	7
(Australia) A Gulley (Australia) A Tobin-Dingwall	4	6
(United States) S Foltz (United States) K Keil	5	2
(Switzerland) L Drescher (Japan) E Inoue	7	6

Semifinals
(United States) H Manset (United States) M Schillig	6^{5}	7	5
4	(Argentina) E Raponi Longo (Argentina) A Villagrán	7^{7}	5	7
(Argentina) M Paz (United States) R Reis	6	7
(Switzerland) L Drescher (Japan) E Inoue	4	5

Final
4	(Argentina) E Raponi Longo (Argentina) A Villagrán	4	5
(Argentina) M Paz (United States) R Reis	6	7
