= 1984 Borden Classic – Singles =

Singles
- 1984 Borden Classic

Final
- Champion: (Japan) Etsuko Inoue
- Runner-up: (United States) Beth Herr
- Score: 6–0, 6–0

Details
- Draw: 32 (4Q)
- Seeds: 8

Events
Singles	Doubles
- Borden Classic

Lisa Bonder was the two-time defending champion, but lost in the semifinals to Etsuko Inoue.

Inoue won the title by defeating Beth Herr 6–0, 6–0 in the final.

== Seeds ==
1. (United States) Lisa Bonder (semifinals)
2. (United States) Beth Herr (final)
3. (Japan) Etsuko Inoue (champion)
4. (Argentina) Adriana Villagrán (quarterfinals)
5. (United States) Shelley Solomon (first round)
6. (Argentina) Emilse Raponi Longo (second round)
7. (Switzerland) Lilian Drescher (first round)
8. (United States) Amy Holton (first round)

== Draw ==
Key

- Q = Qualifier
- WC = Wild card
- LL = Lucky loser
- Alt = Alternate
- ITF = ITF entry
- PR = Protected ranking
- SR = Special ranking
- SE = Special exempt
- JE = Junior exempt
- JR = Junior Accelerator Programme entrant
- CO = College Accelerator Programme entrant
- NG = Next Gen Accelerator Program entrant
- w/o = Walkover
- r = Retired
- d = Defaulted

=== Finals ===
Semifinals
1	(United States) Lisa Bonder	6	1	3
3	(Japan) Etsuko Inoue	1	6	6
(Japan) Masako Yanagi	6	3	2
2	(United States) Beth Herr	3	6	6

Final
3	(Japan) Etsuko Inoue	6	6
2	(United States) Beth Herr	0	0

=== Top half ===
First round
1	(United States) L Bonder	6	6
(United States) B Bramblett	1	3
(West Germany) H Eisterlehner	3	6	3
(Greece) A Kanellopoulou	6	2	6
(United States) C Reynolds	6	6
(United States) R Reis	2	1
(West Germany) M Schropp	6	6
5	(United States) S Solomon	3	2
3	(Japan) E Inoue	6	2	6
(Japan) K Okamoto	2	6	4
(United States) M Van Nostrand	6	6
(Japan) M Mizokuchi	1	3
(United States) T Mochizuki	6	4	6
Q	(Hungary) C Bartos	2	6	7
(United States) S Foltz	7	6
7	(Switzerland) L Drescher	5	4

Second round
1	(United States) L Bonder	6	6
(Greece) A Kanellopoulou	0	0
(United States) C Reynolds	6	6
(West Germany) M Schropp	1	3
3	(Japan) E Inoue	7	6
(United States) M Van Nostrand	6	3
Q	(Hungary) C Bartos	4	3
(United States) S Foltz	6	6

Quarterfinals
1	(United States) L Bonder	5	6	6
(United States) C Reynolds	7	4	4
3	(Japan) E Inoue	6	6
(United States) S Foltz	0	1

Semifinals
1	(United States) L Bonder	6	1	3
3	(Japan) E Inoue	1	6	6

=== Bottom half ===
First round
6	(Argentina) E Raponi Longo	6	6
(Australia) P Whytcross	1	3
(Japan) M Yanagi	6	6
Q	(Argentina) G Sabatini	3	3
Q	(United States) J Forman	2	6	6
(Japan) E Okagawa	6	3	7
(Switzerland) K Stampfli	2	3
4	(Argentina) A Villagrán	6	6
8	(United States) A Holton	4	6	0
(United States) K Keil	6	2	6
(United States) LA Thompson	0	4
(United States) M Quinlan	6	6
(Australia) A Tobin-Dingwall	5	2
Q	(Canada) K Dewis	7	6
(United States) M Schillig	6	3	1
2	(United States) B Herr	4	6	6

Second round
6	(Argentina) E Raponi Longo	7	4	3
(Japan) M Yanagi	5	6	6
(Japan) E Okagawa	4	6	3
4	(Argentina) A Villagrán	6	4	6
(United States) K Keil	4	1
(United States) M Quinlan	6	6
Q	(Canada) K Dewis	1	6	1
2	(United States) B Herr	6	4	6

Quarterfinals
(Japan) M Yanagi	4	6	6
4	(Argentina) A Villagrán	6	3	3
(United States) M Quinlan	5	6	2
2	(United States) B Herr	7	4	6

Semifinals
(Japan) M Yanagi	6	3	2
2	(United States) B Herr	3	6	6
