= Winged lion =

Mythological creature

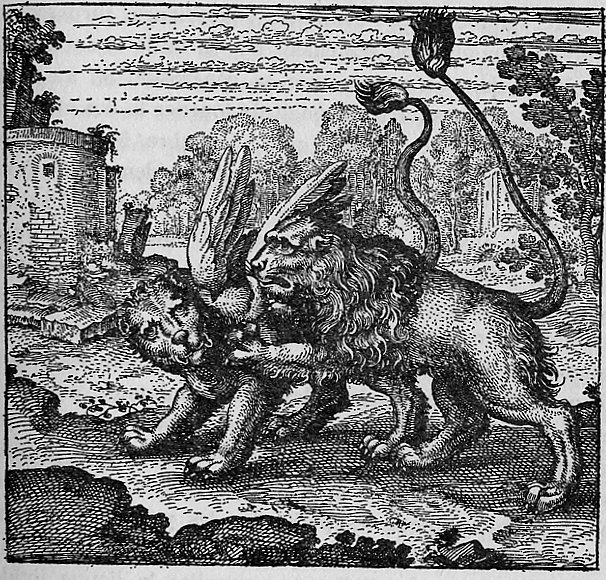
A lion and a winged lion from the emblem book, Atalanta Fugiens, by Michael Maier, first published in 1617

The winged lion is a mythological creature that resembles a lion with bird-like wings.

== Mythical adaptations ==
The winged lion is found in various forms especially in ancient and medieval civilizations.

There were different mythological adaptions for the winged lion:

- On the beautiful ridges of that mountain flying-lion are inhibiting and they will be winching sharks, fish and elephant seals to their lairs. - from The Ramayana IIT translation.
- Lamassu in Mesopotamian mythology was depicted as a winged lion. It was often also depicted with a bull's body instead of a lion's body.
- The griffin in classical mythology was depicted as a lion-eagle creature. Griffin-like creatures were depicted in Egyptian and Persian mythology.
- The first beast in the first vision of the biblical prophet Daniel resembled a winged lion.
- The winged lion was the heraldic symbol of Mark the Evangelist.
- The goetic demon Vapula was depicted as a winged lion.

== Emblems ==
Lion of St. Mark seen on the Venetian Coat of Arms

The emblems of the winged lions were featured in different countries:

- The emblem of the Republic of Venice as the heraldic symbol of St. Mark the Evangelist, the patron saint of the Republic.
  - The Lion of Venice is an ancient bronze sculpture of a winged lion that is located in the Piazzetta di San Marco, Venice.
  - The flag of the short-lived Septinsular Republic, derived from the above (Ionian Islands under Venetian rule), has a winged lion on it.
  - The logo of the Italian company Assicurazioni Generali which has a winged lion on it was derived from the above.
  - The winged Golden Lion is the highest prize of Venice Film Festival.
- The emblem of the North Atlantic Treaty Organization (NATO) Allied Joint Force Command Naples headquarters, in Italy, is a winged lion holding a sword and scroll on which is written PAX - Latin for 'peace'.
- The emblem of the Chinese city of Nanjing is Bixie, a winged lion that wards off evils.

== Gallery ==
Flag of the Septinsular Republic

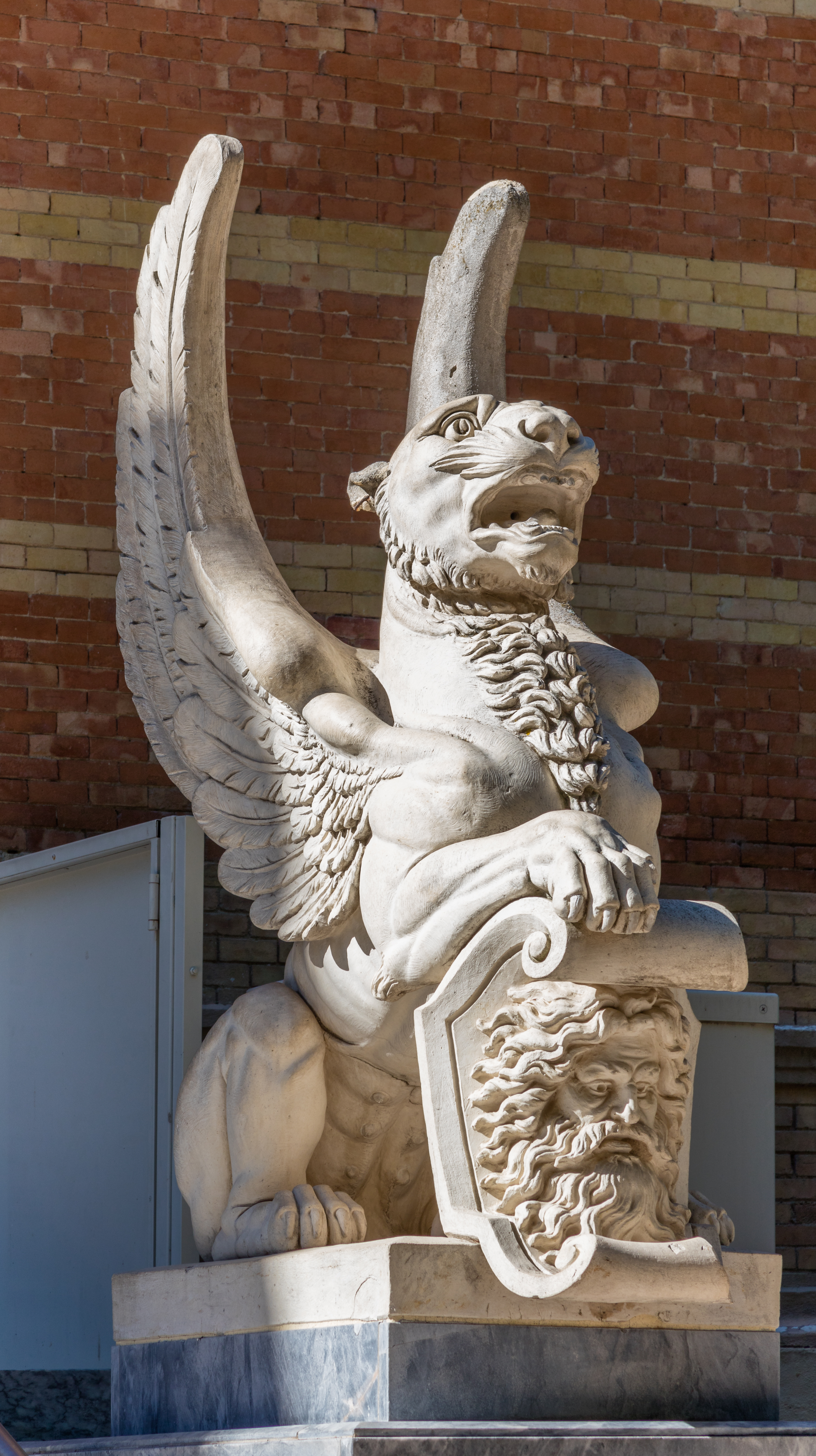
Palacio de Velázquez, Madrid

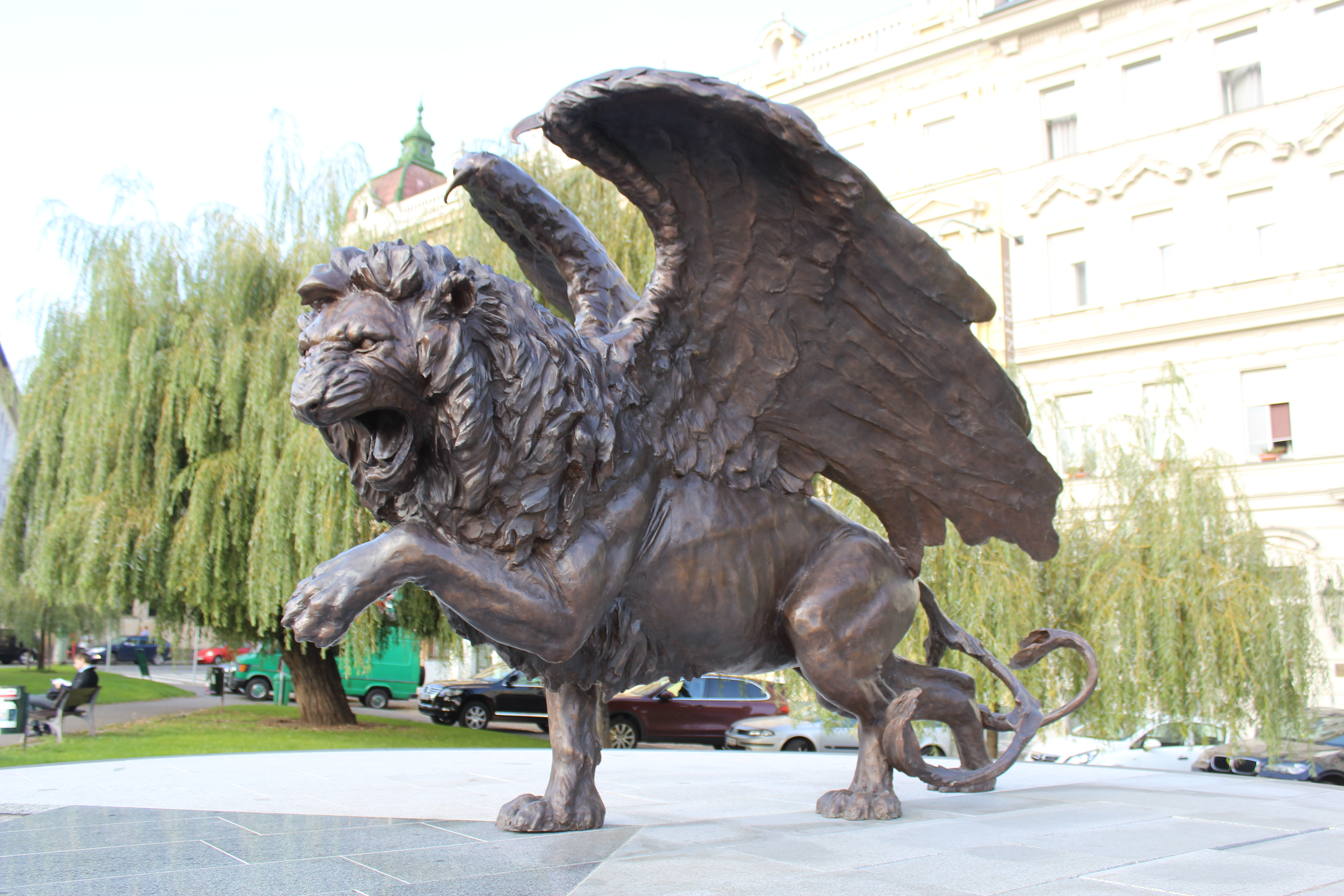
Winged Lion Memorial, Prague, 2014

Coat of arms of Giessen

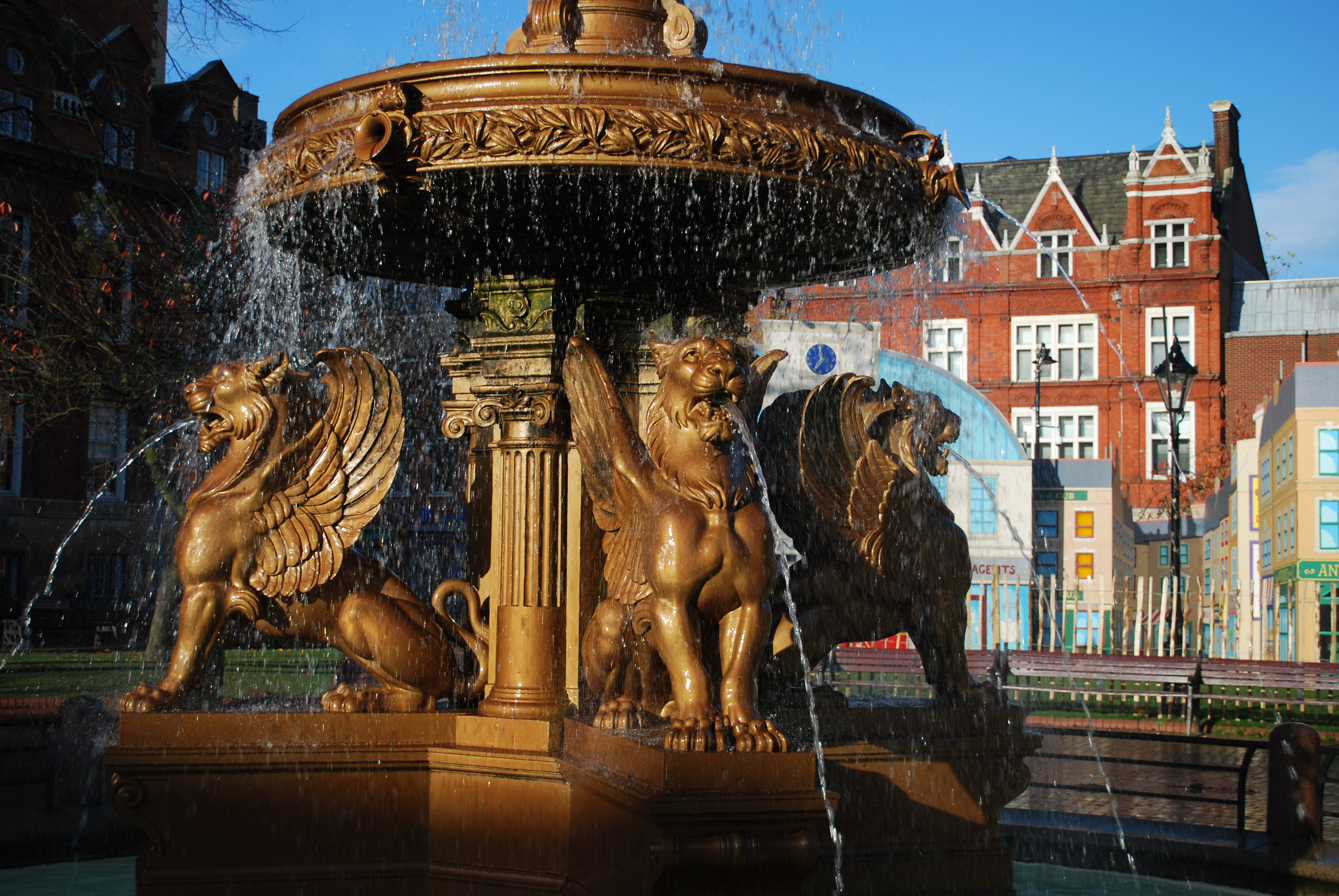
Leicester Town Square Fountain

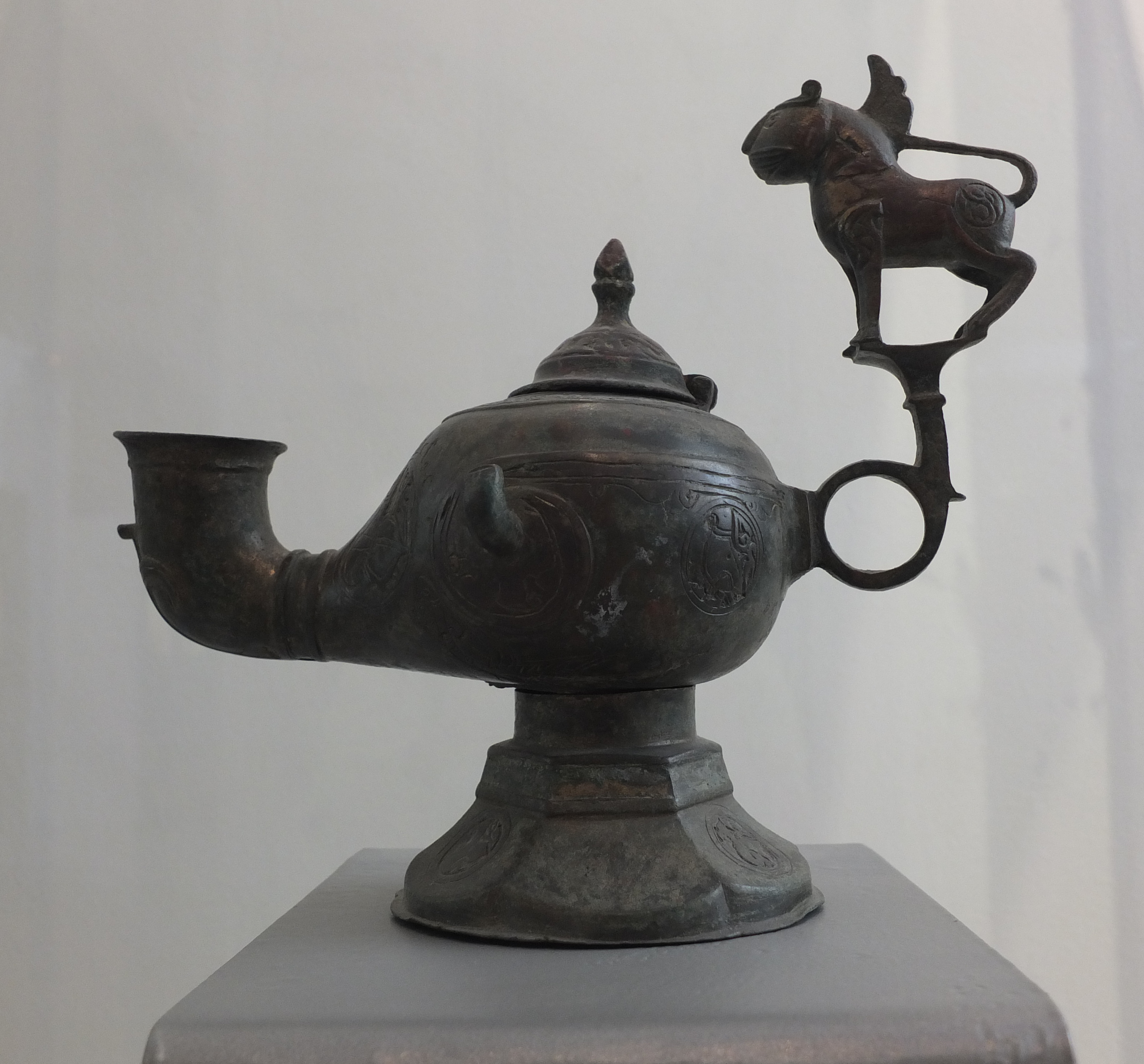
12th-century oil lamp from Khorasan

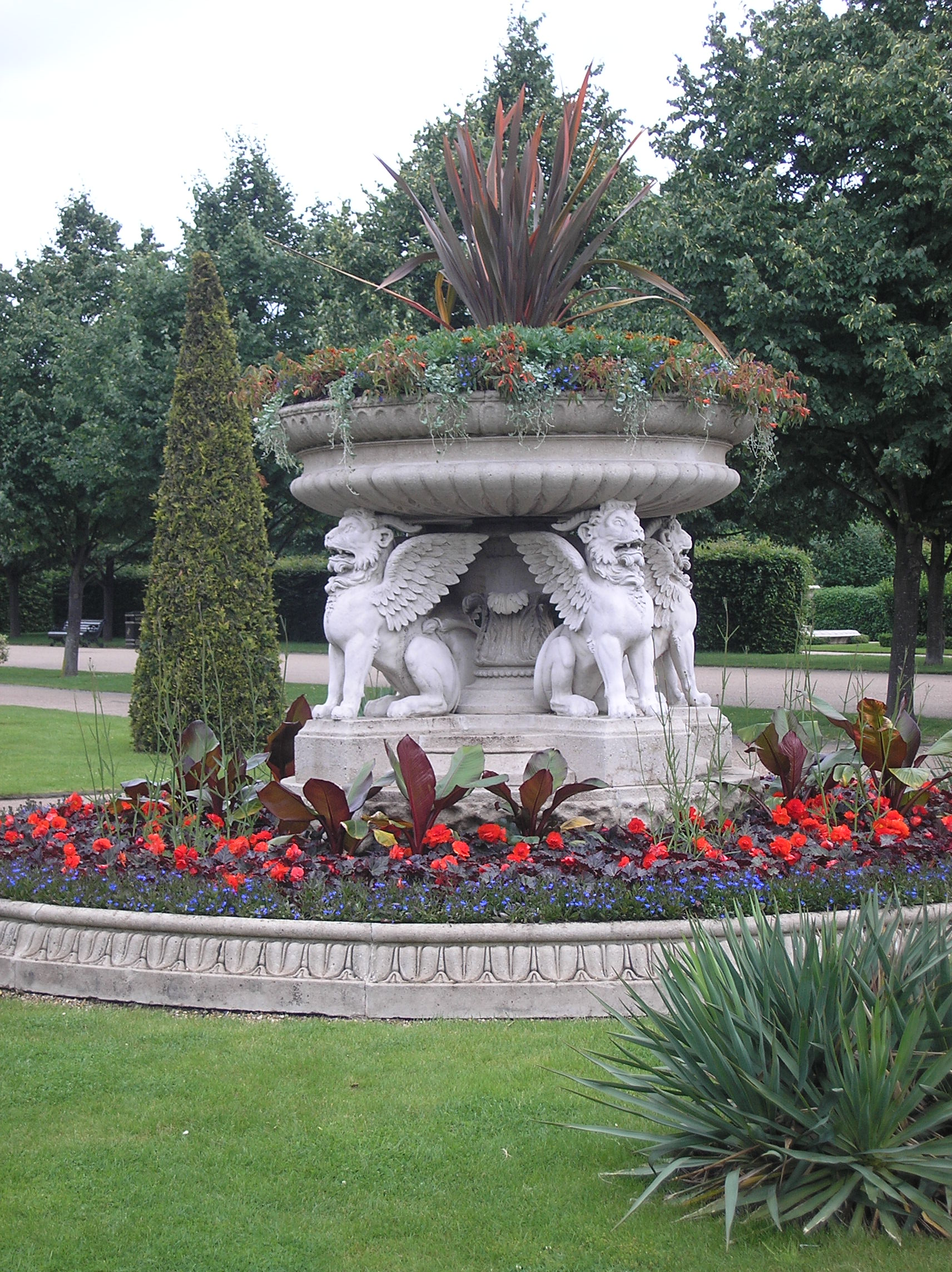
Regent's Park, London

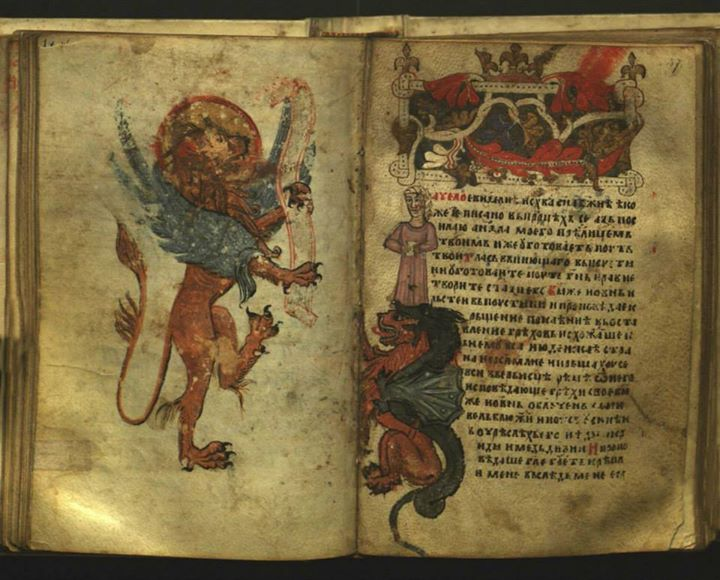
a page from the Nikolje gospels depicting a winged dragon

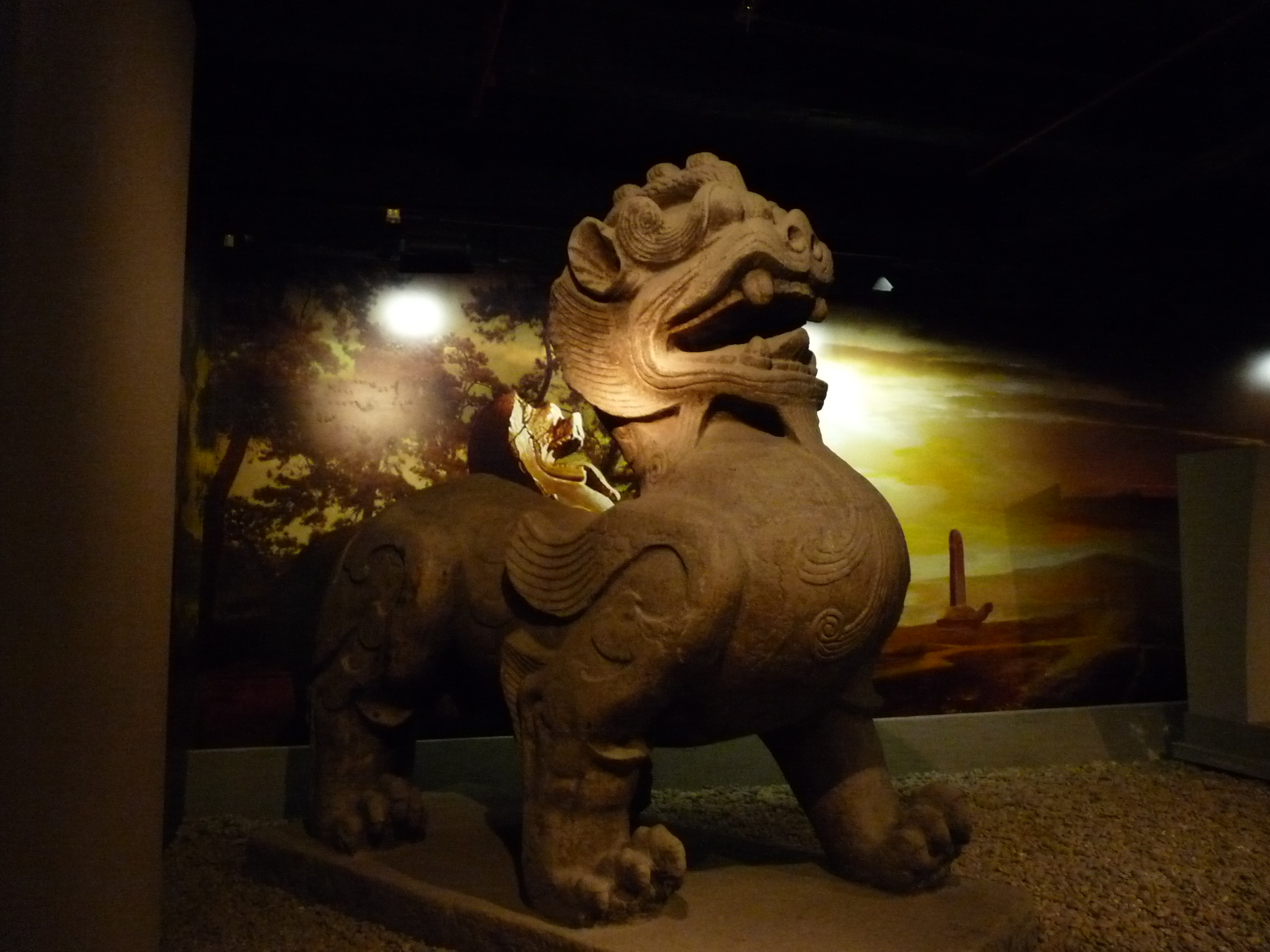
Bixie, Emblem of Nanjing, China

== See also ==
- Aq Bars
- Chimera
- Griffin
- Lamassu
- Manticore
- Merlion
- Nemean lion
- Sea-lion
- Sphinx
- Winged cat
- Lion depictions in art
