= 1983 Borden Classic =

- Date: 10–16 October
- Edition: 5th
- Draw: 32S / 16D
- Prize money: $75,000
- Surface: Hard / outdoor
- Location: Tokyo, Japan

Champions

Singles
- (United States) Lisa Bonder

Doubles
- (Australia) Chris O'Neil / (Australia) Pam Whytcross
← 1982 ·	Borden Classic	· 1984 →

The 1983 Borden Classic was a women's tennis tournament played on outdoor hardcourts in Tokyo, Japan. It was part of the 1983 Virginia Slims World Championship Series. It was the fifth edition of the tournament and was held from 10 October through 16 October 1983. Top-seeded Lisa Bonder won her second consecutive singles title at the event.

== Finals ==
=== Singles ===
(United States) Lisa Bonder defeated (Peru) Laura Arraya 6–1, 6–3

- It was Bonder's 2nd singles title of the year and the 4th and last of her career.

=== Doubles ===
(Australia) Chris O'Neil / (Australia) Pam Whytcross defeated (Australia) Brenda Remilton / (Japan) Naoko Sato 5–7, 7–6, 6–3
