= Gregory S. Martin =

United States Air Force general

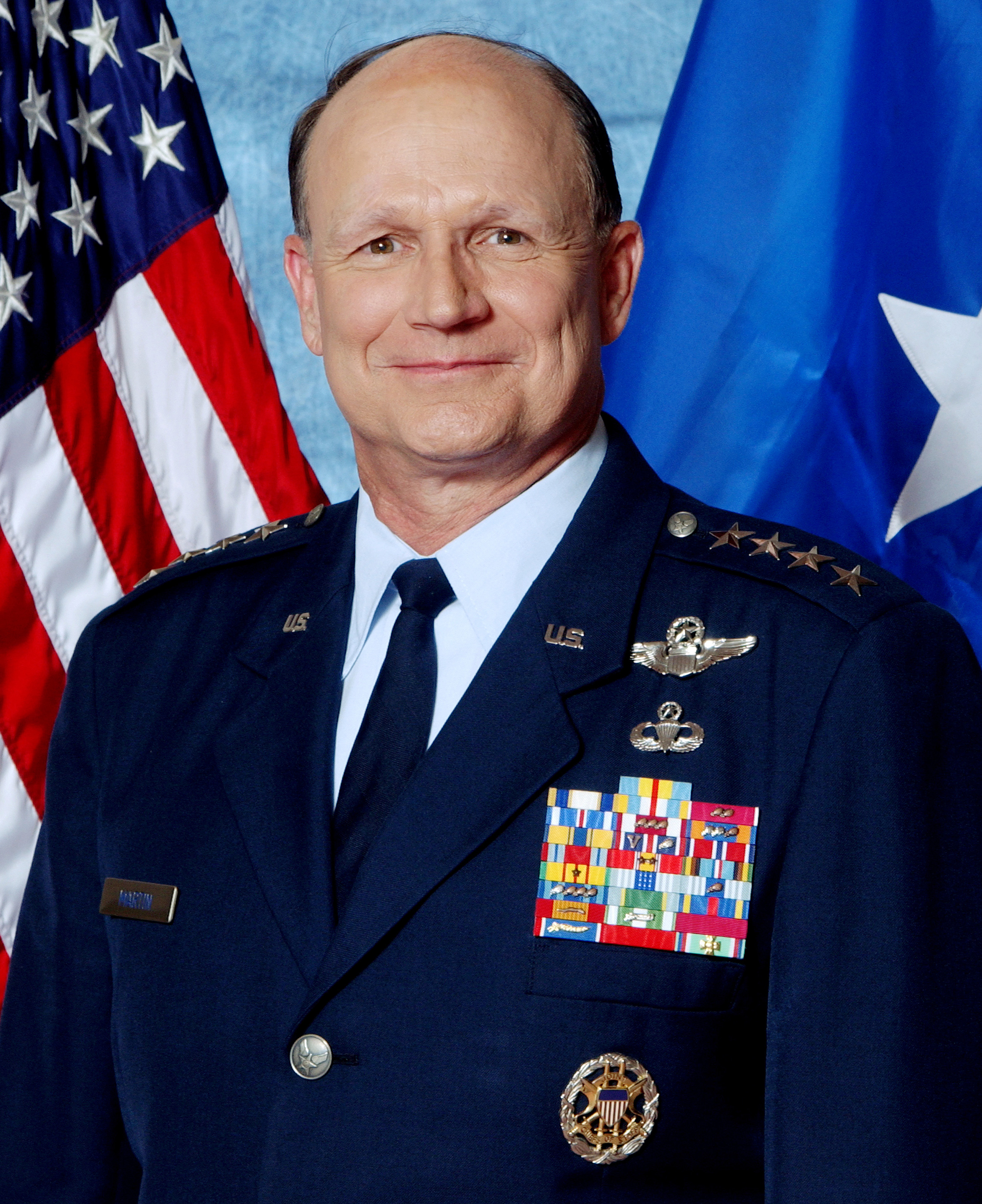
- General Gregory S. Martin
- Born: April 24, 1948 (age 78); Fort Myer, Virginia, U.S.
- Military career
- Allegiance: United States of America
- Branch: United States Air Force
- Service years: 1970-2005
- Rank: General
- Nickname: Speedy
- Commands: Air Force Materiel Command; U.S. Air Forces in Europe; 1st Fighter Wing
- Conflicts: Vietnam War
- Awards: Legion of Merit (3); Distinguished Flying Cross; Air Medal (12); Légion d'honneur

General Gregory Stuart Martin (born April 24, 1948) is a retired U.S. Air Force general and Commander, Air Force Materiel Command at Wright-Patterson Air Force Base, Ohio. Martin was a command pilot with more than 4,600 flying hours in various aircraft, including the F-4, F-15, C-20 and C-21. Upon retirement in 2005, Martin took a position consulting for Northrop Grumman and also served on an Air Force panel studying stealth aircraft technology, among other Pentagon and private industry roles.

== Military career ==
Martin was born in Fort Myer, Virginia in 1948, and graduated from the Landon School, Bethesda, Maryland, in 1966. After graduating from the United States Air Force Academy in 1970, where he was a 1969 National Collegiate Parachuting champion, he went on to fly 161 combat missions in South East Asia, and then went on to train other pilots. In 1977, he received master's degree in business management from Central Michigan University. With this experience, he was tapped to command the 67th Tactical Fighter Squadron, then the 479th Tactical Fighter Training Wing, then the 33rd and 1st Fighter Wings. While earning several awards and decorations, among them the Distinguished Service Medal, he went on to serve as Vice Director of the Joint Staff's Force Structure and Resources Directorate, Director of Operational Requirements for the U.S. Air Force, and Principal Deputy to the Assistant Secretary of the Air Force for Acquisition. Before finally commanding Air Materiel Command, Martin served as the Commander of U.S. Air Forces in Europe and Allied Air Forces Northern Europe.

In 2004, Martin was nominated to succeed Admiral Thomas B. Fargo as combatant commander of U.S. Pacific Command, the first non-Navy nominee for this prestigious post. However, he suffered collateral damage from the Darleen Druyun procurement scandal. During his October 6 confirmation hearing for the Pacific Command post before the Senate Armed Services Committee, Senator John McCain asked how Druyun's deceit had gone unnoticed. Martin, who had worked closely with Druyun in 1998-99 while he held the position of Principal Deputy in acquisition said in response "I'm not an expert in contracting," and "I saw nothing that she was doing that was inappropriate or in any way illegal, and if I had, I would have immediately raised a Red Flag!." McCain replied, "Now I question whether you have the quality to command". McCain called the Boeing deal "a national disgrace", and vowed to hold Martin's nomination in the Senate Armed Services Committee "until we get all of the e-mails and all of the answers." Committee Chairman John W. Warner supported McCain, and Martin withdrew his name the same day and returned to his duties as the Commander of the Air Force Materiel Command until his scheduled retirement in August 2005. Seven months later, Senator McCain completed his review of the e-mails and there were no indications that General Martin had any knowledge of Druyun's improprieties. Prior to this setback, Martin had been considered the likely successor to Air Force Chief of Staff John P. Jumper.

== Post-military career ==
Martin retired from the Air Force on September 1, 2005. He is currently a chair of the National Academies Air Force Studies Board, has served as an unaligned advisor to John Edwards' presidential campaign, is on the advisory board of a consultancy firm The Four Star Group, is board member and retired chairman of the Durango Group, and has served in other Pentagon capacities and been a consultant to "many defense sector firms."

In 2010, the Boston Globe reported on the Northrop Grumman approach to Martin at his retirement in 2005 and the call "a few weeks later [from] the National Academies Air Force Studies Board, asking him to join a top-secret Air Force panel studying the future of stealth aircraft technology." Northrop Grumman is the manufacturer of the B-2 stealth bomber. Martin accepted the job offer and agreed to the Air Force Studies Board request. The article examined the claim that such dual retirement roles for Martin and other generals and admirals is "ethical and beneficial for America's defense." Martin asserted that for this study, the National Academies reached out to all of the major US Aerospace Defense companies to ensure that the study included not only Defense and Academic specialists, but that the latest development experts with regard to propulsion and aerodynamic to contribute to this landmark study. Seth Bonder, a fellow Pentagon panel member from the National Academy of Engineering, though, had not been made aware of the general's industry role during the two-year study and "said disclosure of potential conflicts would be desirable." To clarify the National Academies process, it should be known that all study committee members must disclose their financial and business arrangements openly and verbally to the study committee members and in writing to the National Research Council (a sub element to the National Academies) before being allowed to participate in a study. General Martin's disclosures were completed and accepted without objection.

== Education ==
- 1970 Bachelor of Science degree, U.S. Air Force Academy, Colorado Springs, Colorado
- 1974 Squadron Officer School, Maxwell AFB, Alabama
- 1977 Master's degree in business management, Central Michigan University
- 1978 Air Command and Staff College, by correspondence
- 1979 National Security Management, by correspondence
- 1986 National War College, Fort Lesley J. McNair, Washington, D.C.
- 1987 Seminar XXI - Foreign Political and International Relations, Massachusetts Institute of Technology
- 1991 Advanced Management Program, Duke University, Durham, North Carolina

== Assignments ==
- August 1970 - August 1971, student, undergraduate pilot training, Laredo AFB, Texas
- August 1971 - May 1972, student, F-4 replacement training, George AFB, California
- May 1972 - October 1972, F-4 aircraft commander, 388th Tactical Fighter Wing, Korat Royal Thai Air Force Base, Thailand
- October 1972 - June 1973, F-4 flight leader, 421st Tactical Fighter Squadron, Udon Royal Thai AFB, Thailand
- June 1973 - June 1976, F-4 instructor pilot, 49th Tactical Fighter Wing, Holloman AFB, New Mexico
- June 1976 - July 1977, assignment officer, Air Staff Training Program, Headquarters U.S. Air Force, Washington, D.C.
- July 1977 - August 1978, aide to the Air Force Chief of Staff, Headquarters U.S. Air Force, Washington, D.C.
- August 1978 - October 1981, F-15 instructor pilot and flight commander, 461st Tactical Fighter Training Squadron, Luke AFB, Arizona
- October 1981 - August 1985, Chief of Wing Training, 12th Tactical Fighter Squadron, later, operations officer, later, Commander, 67th Tactical Fighter Squadron, Kadena Air Base, Japan
- August 1985 - June 1986, student, National War College, Fort Lesley J. McNair, Washington, D.C.
- June 1986 - July 1988, Chief, Continental U.S. Bases and Units Division, later, Chief of Tactical Programs for the Air Staff's Directorate of Programs and Resources, Headquarters U.S. Air Force, Washington, D.C.
- July 1988 - July 1989, Vice Commander, 49th Tactical Fighter Wing, Holloman AFB, New Mexico
- July 1989 - August 1990, executive officer to the Commander, later, Assistant Deputy Chief of Staff for Plans, Headquarters Tactical Air Command, Langley AFB, Virginia
- August 1990 - August 1991, Commander, 479th Tactical Training Wing, Holloman AFB, New Mexico
- August 1991 - June 1993, Commander, 33rd Fighter Wing, Eglin AFB, Florida
- June 1993 - May 1995, Commander, 1st Fighter Wing, Langley AFB, Virginia
- May 1995 - July 1996, deputy director, later, Vice Director, Force Structure and Resources, the Joint Staff, Washington, D.C.
- July 1996 - January 1997, Director of Operational Requirements, Deputy Chief of Staff for Plans and Operations, Headquarters U.S. Air Force, Washington, D.C.
- January 1997 - July 1998, Director of Operational Requirements, Deputy Chief of Staff for Air and Space Operations, Headquarters U.S. Air Force, Washington, D.C.
- July 1998 - January 2000, Principal Deputy, Office of the Assistant Secretary of the Air Force for Acquisition, Washington, D.C.
- January 2000 - March 2000, Commander, U.S. Air Forces in Europe; Commander, Allied Air Forces Central Europe; and Air Force Component Commander, U.S. European Command, Ramstein Air Base, Germany
- March 2000 - August 2003, Commander, U.S. Air Forces in Europe and Allied Air Forces Northern Europe, Ramstein AB, Germany
- August 2003 - August 2005, Commander, Air Force Materiel Command, Wright-Patterson AFB, Ohio

== Flight information ==
- Rating: Command pilot, master parachutist
- Flight hours: More than 4,600
- Aircraft flown: F-4, F-15, C-20 and C-21

== Awards and decorations ==
| US Air Force Command Pilot Badge |
| Master Parachutist Badge |
| Joint Chiefs of Staff Badge |

| Defense Distinguished Service Medal |
| Air Force Distinguished Service Medal |
| Defense Superior Service Medal |
| Legion of Merit with two bronze oak leaf clusters |
| Distinguished Flying Cross |
| Meritorious Service Medal with three oak leaf clusters |
| Air Medal with two silver and one bronze oak leaf clusters |
| Air Force Commendation Medal |
| Air Force Outstanding Unit Award with Valor device and silver oak leaf cluster |
| Air Force Organizational Excellence Award |
| Combat Readiness Medal |
| National Defense Service Medal with two bronze service stars |
| Armed Forces Expeditionary Medal |
| Vietnam Service Medal with service star |
| Air Force Overseas Short Tour Service Ribbon |
| Air Force Overseas Long Tour Service Ribbon with oak leaf cluster |
| Air Force Longevity Service Award with silver and three bronze oak leaf clusters |
| Small Arms Expert Marksmanship Ribbon |
| Air Force Training Ribbon |
| Vietnam Gallantry Cross with palm |
| Order of Valour, Knight (Cameroon) |
| Medal of Merit in Gold (Netherlands) |
| Légion d'honneur, Knight (France) |
| Cross of Merit of the Minister of Defence of the Czech Republic, 1st Class |
| Vietnam Gallantry Cross Unit Citation |
| NATO Meritorious Service Medal |
| Vietnam Campaign Medal |

== Other achievements ==
- 1969 National Collegiate Parachuting Champion
- 2002 Honorary Doctorate, University of Maryland
- 2003 Air Force Order of the Sword, U.S. Air Forces in Europe

== Effective dates of promotion ==
- Second Lieutenant June 3, 1970
- First Lieutenant December 3, 1971
- Captain December 3, 1973
- Major September 1, 1979
- Lieutenant Colonel December 1, 1982
- Colonel December 1, 1986
- Brigadier General July 1, 1993
- Major General July 1, 1996
- Lieutenant General July 27, 1998
- General June 1, 2000

== See also ==
- List of commanders of USAFE
