= Euan Edworthy =

Euan Edworthy MBE
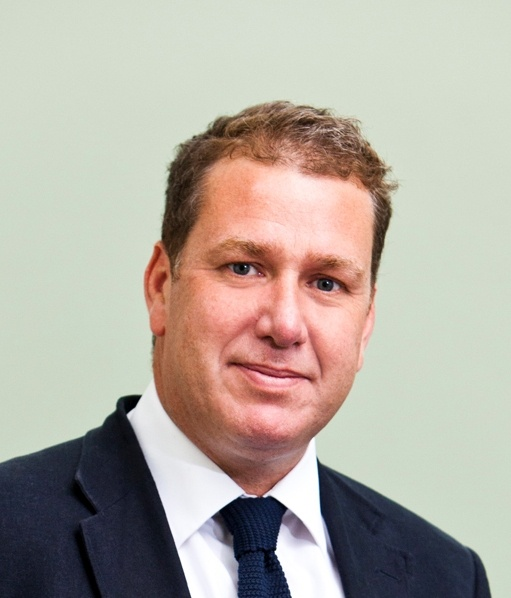
- Euan Edworthy in 2012
- Born: 31 October 1968 (age 57); Salisbury, Wiltshire, United Kingdom
- Education: Ampleforth College
- Alma mater: University of Wales
- Occupations: Public relations consultant, philanthropist
- Known for: Fundraising for Winged Lion Memorial and Speakers' Corners
- Children: Nicholas Edworthy
- Honours: Cross of Merit of the Minister of Defence of the Czech Republic

Euan Edworthy MBE (born 31 October 1968) is a British public relations (PR) consultant and philanthropist based in Prague, Czech Republic.

== Early life ==
Edworthy was born in Salisbury, England, on 31 October 1968. He was educated at Ampleforth College and graduated from the University of Wales, Cardiff, in 1991 with a degree in Politics and History.

== Career ==
He began his PR career at London-based PR company Good Relations, in the property planning and development department. In 1993, he became a consultant for Rowland Company in Hong Kong, before moving to Prague in 1994 as an advisor to the Czech government on foreign investment. In 1995, he established Best Communications.

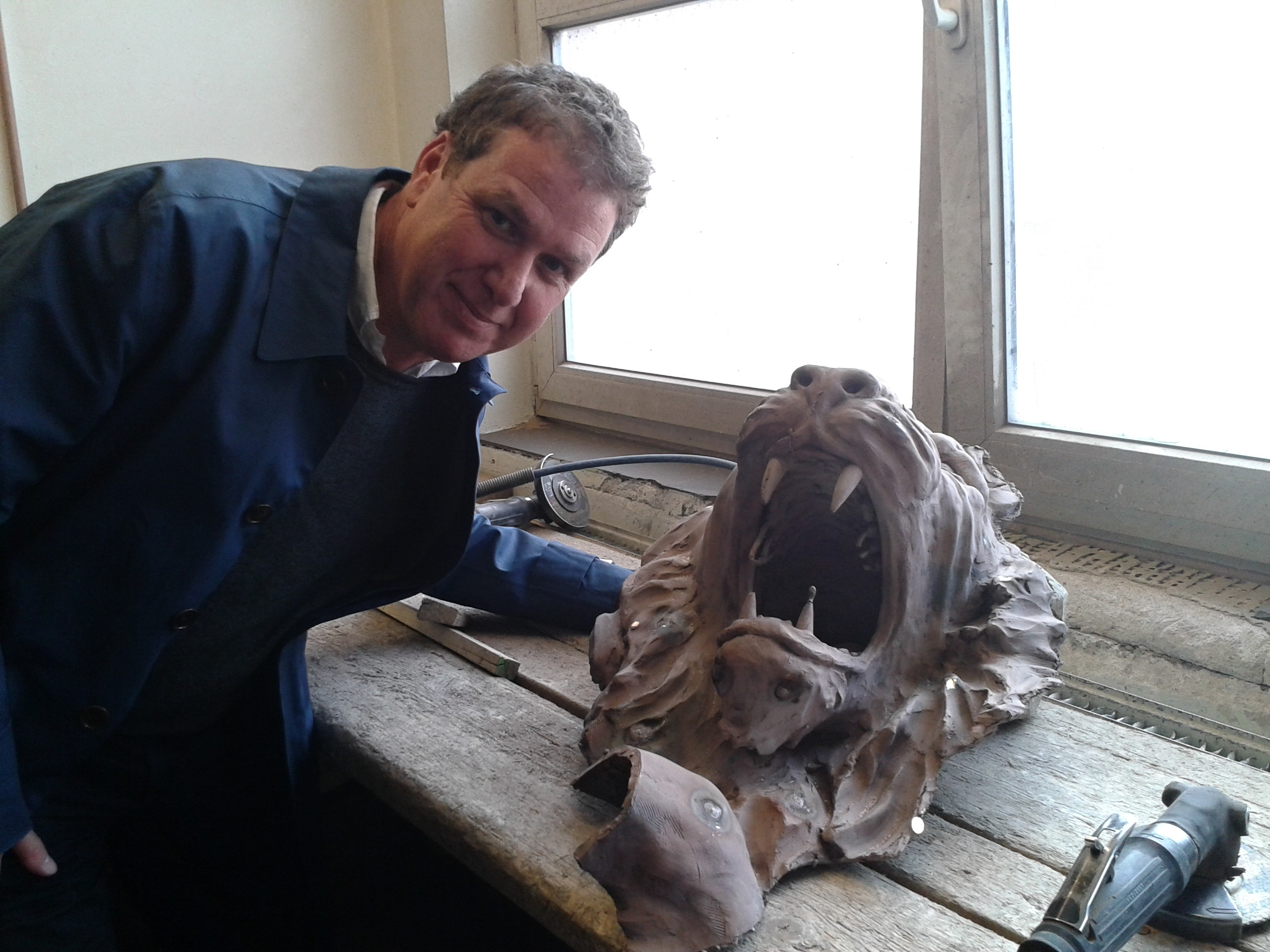
Edworthy with a Winged Lion mask in Horní Kalná, 2014

== Charitable work ==
During his three decades in Prague, Edworthy has been involved in a number of charitable enterprises.

In 2004, he launched a Speakers' Corner on Prague's Palackého náměstí, where demonstrations can be held without a permit, the first such site in continental Europe. In 2007, he established the Speakers' Corner Trust, a registered charity which promotes freedom of expression, public debate and active citizenship in the UK and emerging democracies such as the Czech Republic. This trust also worked for the 2009 creation of the Speakers' Corner in Nottingham, England.

In 2014, Edworthy realised a project, backed by the British expatriate community in Prague, to build a public memorial dedicated to honouring the Czechoslovak pilots who served in the Royal Air Force (RAF) during World War II. After four months, he had raised £100,000 to fund the project. Edworthy said his father had served in the Royal Air Force, and often told him about the Czechoslovak pilots' bravery. The Winged Lion Memorial (sculpted by British sculptor Colin Spofforth) was unveiled at a ceremony on 17 June 2014, attended by surviving veterans, relatives of the airmen, as well as representatives of the Czech, Slovak and British governments, including British Member of Parliament Nicholas Soames and Air Chief Marshal Stuart Peach.

More money has since been raised to build a plaque on the plinth of the Winged Lion, listing the names of all 2,507 Czechoslovak airmen who served in the RAF during World War II, with their full ranks and crosses next to the names of those who died in action.

Edworthy was a trustee of the Anglo-Czech Education Fund for eight years, and helped establish the Czech Children of Courage Award and Prague's Red Nose Day Campaign.

== Awards and honours ==
Edworthy was appointed Member of the Order of the British Empire (MBE) in the 2020 Birthday Honours for services to UK-Czech Republic relations, under the diplomatic service list.

In recognition of his work honouring the memory of the Czechoslovak RAF pilots, on 11 November 2019 he received the Cross of Merit of the Minister of Defence of the Czech Republic. The Cross of Merit is awarded to citizens of foreign nations who have worked in cooperation with the Ministry of Defence of the Czech Republic and engaged in activities in support of the Armed Forces of the Czech Republic.

== Personal life ==
Edworthy lives in Prague and is married.
