= 1978 Rio de la Plata Championships =

Tennis tournament

- Date: 30 October – 5 November
- Category: Colgate Series (A)
- Draw: 32S / 16D
- Prize money: $35,000
- Surface: Clay / outdoor
- Location: Buenos Aires, Argentina

Champions

Singles
- (United States) Caroline Stoll

Doubles
- (France) Françoise Dürr / (United States) Valerie Ziegenfuss
← 1977 ·	Rio de la Plata Championships	· 1979 →

The 1978 Rio de la Plata Championships, also known as the River Plate Championships, was a women's singles tennis tournament played on outdoor clay courts in Buenos Aires in Argentina. The event was part of the A (Note: Tournaments with prize money for the women of at least $35,000.) category of the 1978 Colgate Series. The tournament was held from 30 October through 5 November 1978. Third-seeded Caroline Stoll won the singles title and earned $6,000 first-prize money.

== Winners ==
=== Singles ===
(United States) Caroline Stoll defeated (Argentina) Emilse Raponi 6–3, 6–2

- It was Stoll's 1st title of the year and the 1st of her career.

=== Doubles ===
(France) Françoise Dürr / (United States) Valerie Ziegenfuss defeated (United States) Laura DuPont / (Czechoslovakia) Regina Maršíková 1–6, 6–4, 6–3

== Prize money ==
Event	W	F	SF	QF	Round of 16	Round of 32
Singles	$6,000	$3,000	$1,800	$900	$600	$325
