= Winged Lion Memorial =

Sculpture in Prague, Czech Republic

- Památník Okřídleného lva (Czech)
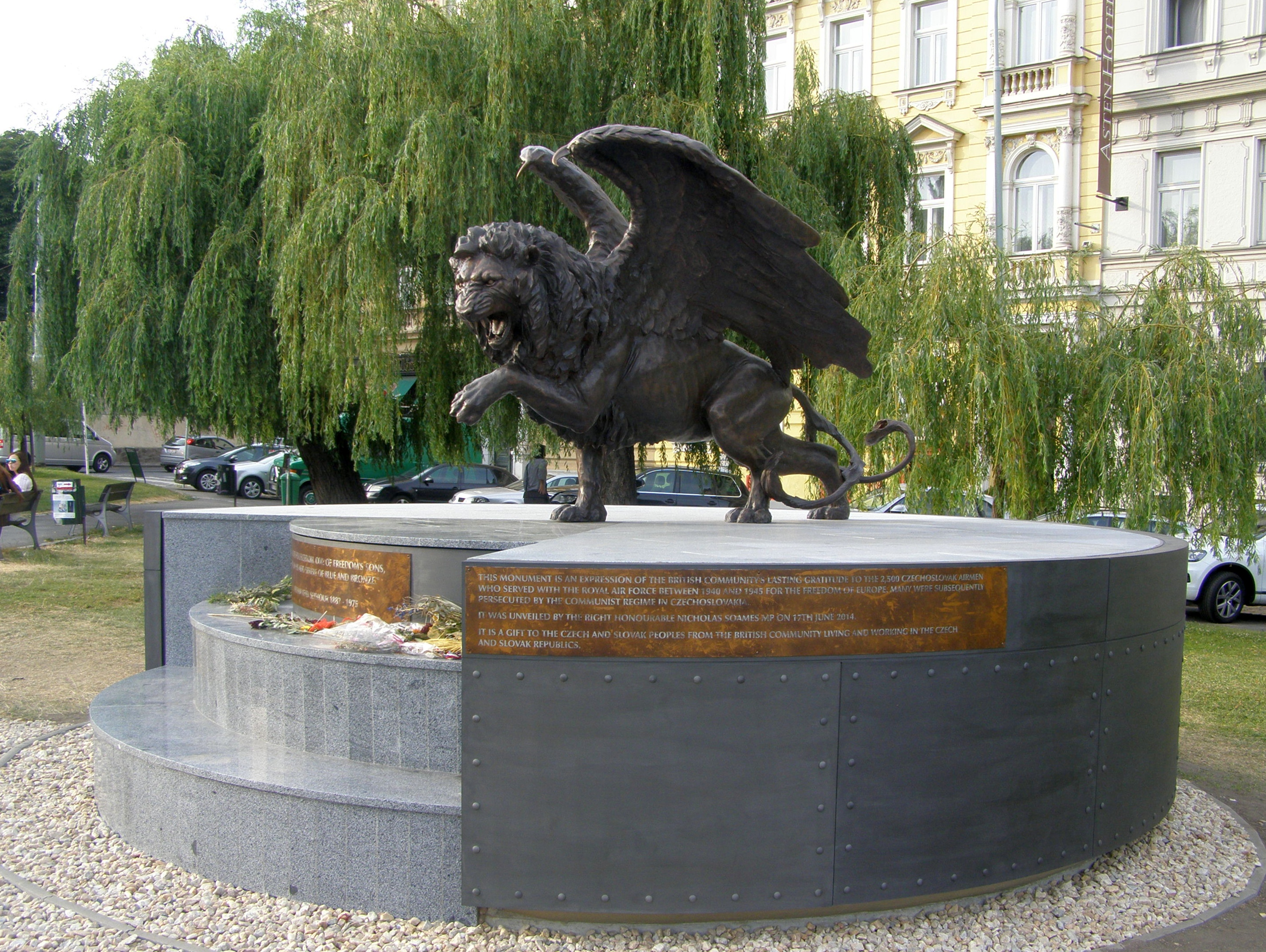
- Winged Lion Memorial, Prague

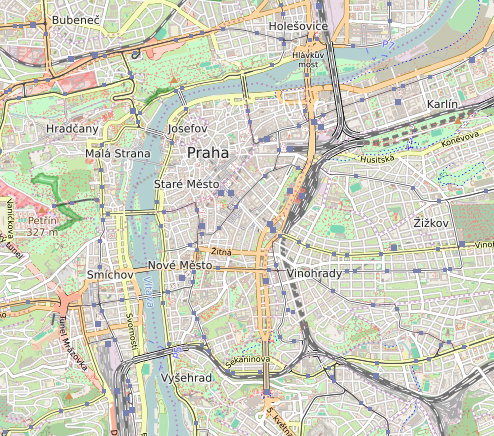
- Location in Prague
- Location: Prague, Czech Republic; 50°05′27″N 14°24′37″E

The Winged Lion Memorial (Czech: Památník Okřídleného lva) was unveiled on 17 June 2014 at Klárov in Prague by the British Member of Parliament, Rt Hon Sir Nicholas Soames MP, grandson of Sir Winston Churchill. It is dedicated to the Czechoslovak airmen who served in the Royal Air Force (RAF) during World War II and who achieved acclaim for their contribution to the Battle of Britain.

== Description ==
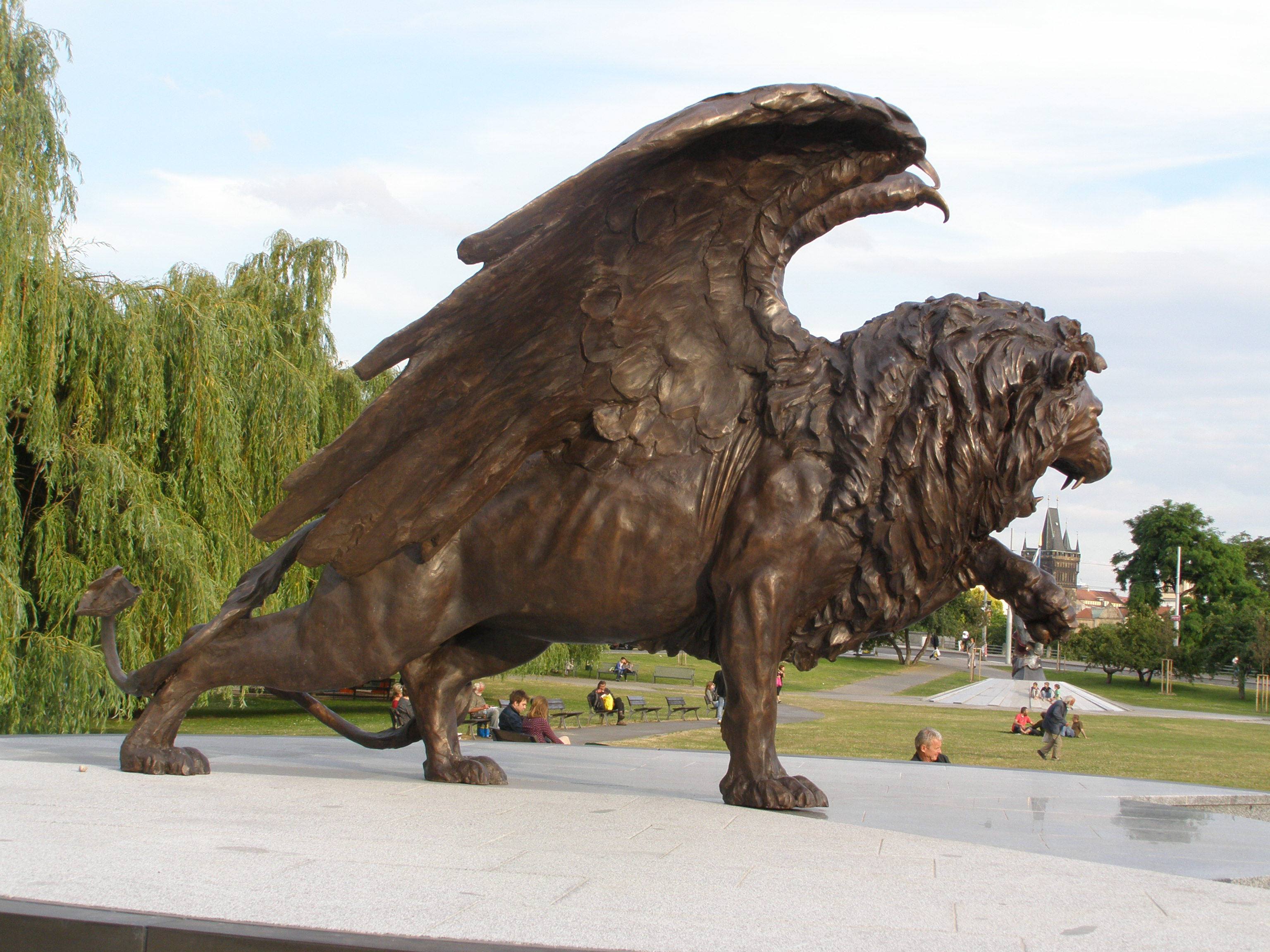
Winged Lion Memorial, left side

The two metre high Winged Lion is the work of the contemporary British sculptor Colin Spofforth. The Lion was cast in bronze at the artistic foundry in Horní Kalná, Hradec Králové Region. The Lion is placed on a concrete plinth covered by Czech granite. When viewed from above, the circular pedestal resembles the insignia of the Czech Air Force. The plinth riveted side coverings replicate the fuselage surface of aircraft of the day and since 2018 bear the names of all the Czechoslovaks who served with the Royal Air Force during the second world war. In 2019 the site was extended with benches, information panels and paving around the plinth.

Inscribed on the monument in both Czech and English is: This monument is an expression of the British Community’s lasting gratitude to the 2,500 Czechoslovak airmen who served with the Royal Air Force between 1940 and 1945 for the freedom of Europe.

Also there is a quotation from British poet William Kean Seymour (1887-1975): "He fights for freedom, one of freedom's sons, lone in his aery sphere of blue and bronze."

It was unveiled by the right honourable Sir Nicholas Soames MP on 17 June 2014 as a gift to the Czech and Slovak peoples from the British community living and working in Czechia and Slovakia.

== History ==
During World War II, some 2507 Czech and Slovak men and women served in the British Royal Air Force. About a fifth of them did not survive the war. Not all of them were pilots. In addition to the well-known men in blue, there was the ground crew. Other men worked in administrative positions such as liaison officers in the Royal Air Force or in the training units. Among the RAF pilots there were also airmen from many other countries. Czechoslovaks, like their Polish comrades, earned a great reputation in the RAF.

After February 1948, the Czechoslovaks who had served in the RAF and had repatriated to Czechoslovakia after 15 August 1945, often with wives and children, were subsequently persecuted by the communist regime.

The installation of the monument met with the criticism of Prague's conservationists, who protested against its location. The protest was not upheld.

== Funding and unveiling ==
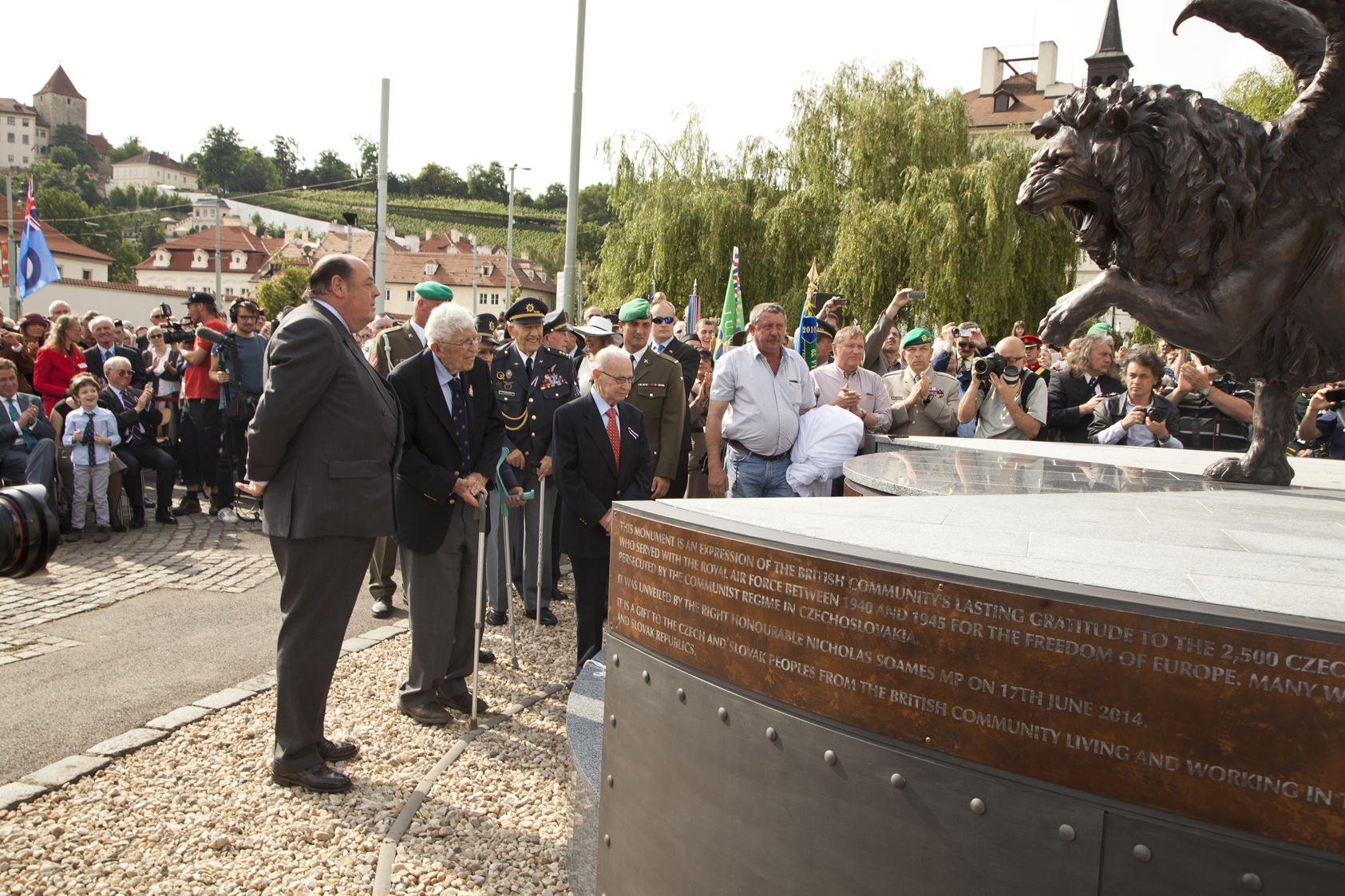
Unveiling of the memorial

About 99% of the funds raised (about three million Czech crowns) was donated by the British community in Czechia and Slovakia. Donations from Czech citizens, businesses and individuals were also received. The origins of the monument are credited to Mr. Euan Edworthy, who has lived in the Czech Republic for many years and whose father served in the Royal Air Force and Colonel Andrew Shepherd, UK Defence Attaché.

The unveiling ceremony at Klárov was accompanied by music performed by the Royal Air Force College band and by the Pipes and Drums of the Queen's Royal Hussars. The event was attended by nine former Czechoslovak RAF members. Before the unveiling, Sir Nicholas Soames (the grandson of Sir Winston Churchill) gave a speech; he referred to the memorial as a symbol of the courage of the 2,500 Czechoslovak airmen and reminded the famous phrase of his grandfather, Churchill, who, speaking of the pilots who took part in the Battle of Britain, proclaimed that "never was so much owed by so many to so few." Immediately following unveiling of the memorial a legendary aircraft Spitfire, in the livery of Squadron Leader Otto Smik DFC, made a flypast over Prague.

== See also ==
- List of public art in Prague
