= Awards and decorations of the Armed Forces of the Czech Republic =

Military awards and decorations of the Czech Republic are issued by the minister of defence of the Czech Republic to members of the Armed forces of the Czech Republic serving under its command, civil employees of the Ministry and foreign soldiers who co-operated with/under Czech command. Members of the Armed forces of the Czech Republic are eligible for State decorations of the Czech Republic. These decorations are awarded by the President of the Czech Republic.

This list contains military decorations which are awarded in the name of the minister of defence and the chief of the general staff.

== Awards by the Minister of Defence ==
- State Defence Cross of the Minister of Defence of the Czech Republic
- Golden Linden Decoration the Ministry of Defence of the Czech Republic
- Cross of Merit of the Minister of Defence of the Czech Republic
- Medal for Injury
- Medal For Service Abroad
- Medal of Armed Forces of the Czech Republic

== Awards by the Chief of General Staff ==
- Badge of Honour of King Ottokar II, Iron and Golden King
- Badge of Honour of Staff Captain Václav Morávek
