= 1983 Head Cup =

- Date: 18–24 July
- Edition: 16th
- Surface: Clay
- Location: Kitzbuhel, Austria

Champions

Singles
- (France) Pascale Paradis

Doubles
- (Australia) Chris Newton / (Australia) Pam Whytcross
- WTA Austrian Open

The 1983 Head Cup was a women's tennis tournament played on outdoor clay courts in Kitzbuhel, Austria that was a non-tour event, i.e. not part of the 1983 Virginia Slims World Championship Series. The tournament was held from 18 July through 24 July 1983. Pascale Paradis won the singles title.

== Finals ==
=== Singles ===
(France) Pascale Paradis defeated (Austria) Petra Huber 3–6, 6–3, 6–2

- It was Paradis' 1st singles career title.

=== Doubles ===
(Australia) Chris Newton / (Australia) Pam Whytcross defeated (France) Nathalie Herreman / (France) Pascale Paradis 2–6, 6–4, 7–6

- It was Newton's only career title. It was Whytcross' 1st career title.
