= Norberto Longo =

Argentine-American sportscaster (1941–2003)

- Born: Norberto Longo; February 15, 1942; Buenos Aires, Argentina
- Died: April 19, 2003 (aged 61); Miami, Florida, U.S.
- Occupations: Television Journalist, Television personality, Sports anchor
- Years active: 1962–2003
- Spouse: Emilse Raponi (1980–2003)

Norberto Longo (February 15, 1942 - April 19, 2003) was a Spanish-language sportscaster in the United States. Born in Buenos Aires, Argentina, Norberto Longo primarily provided Spanish-language commentary of soccer matches. A lifelong boxing fan, he hosted the weekly Boxeo Estelar television show on Univision, commenting live on fights featuring Julio César Chávez, Roberto Durán and Wilfredo Gómez, among others.

== Professional career ==
Norberto Longo was the lead sports analyst for Spanish International Network/Univision from 1984 to 1999. He was the former reporting partner of Andrés Cantor for almost a decade on Univision and later with Telemundo 1999 to 2003.

== Death ==
Longo died on April 19, 2003, of a heart attack at the age of 61.
