= 1982 Borden Classic =

- Date: 11–17 October
- Edition: 4th
- Category: Toyota Series (Category 2)
- Draw: 32S / 16D
- Prize money: $75,000
- Surface: Hard / outdoor
- Location: Tokyo, Japan

Champions

Singles
- (United States) Lisa Bonder

Doubles
- (Australia) Brenda Remilton / (Japan) Naoko Sato
| ← 1981 · | Borden Classic | · 1983 → |

The 1982 Borden Classic was a women's tennis tournament played on outdoor hardcourts in Tokyo, Japan. The event was part of the Category 2 (Note: Tournaments with prize money for the women of at least $75,000.) of the 1982 Toyota Series. It was the fourth edition of the tournament and was held from 11 October through 17 October 1982. Fourth-seeded Lisa Bonder won the singles title.

== Finals ==
=== Singles ===
(United States) Lisa Bonder defeated (United States) Shelley Solomon 2–6, 6–0, 6–3

- It was Bonder's 2nd and last singles title of the year and the 2nd of her career.

=== Doubles ===
(Australia) Brenda Remilton / (Japan) Naoko Sato defeated (United States) Laura duPont / (United States) Barbara Jordan 2–6, 6–3, 6–3

- It was Remilton's only doubles title of her career. It was Sato's only doubles title of her career.
