= Cross of Merit of the Minister of Defence of the Czech Republic =

Cross of Merit of the Minister of Defence of the Czech Republic Záslužný kříž ministra obrany České republiky
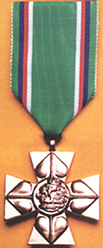
- Decoration in First Class
- Type: Three class military decoration
- Awarded for: heroism, successful leadership during battle, meritorious service in combat activities, outstanding performance in the command of troops during peacetime, meritorious performance of service or work duties, excellent representation of the Armed Forces of the Czech Republic, or for other significant acts of merit performed in support of the Defence department.
- Country: Czech Republic
- Presented by: Minister of Defence
- Eligibility: Citizens of the Czech Republic, as well as foreign nationals
- Status: Currently awarded
- Established: 16 December 1996
- Ribbon bar of the first class Ribbon bar of the second class Ribbon bar of the third class

Precedence
- Next (higher): Medal of Merit
- Next (lower): State Defence Cross of the Minister of Defence of the Czech Republic

The Cross of Merit of the Minister of Defence of the Czech Republic (Czech: Záslužný kříž ministra obrany České republiky) was established on 16 December 1996. The military decoration is presented in three classes, and was the highest award bestowed by the Minister of Defence until October 2008.

== Criteria ==
The decoration may be presented to soldiers of the Armed Forces of the Czech Republic as well as civilian employees. The cross is presented to recognize heroism, leadership during combat, and for noteworthy service in combat activities. The cross may also awarded for commanding troops during peacetime, exceptionally performing service or assigned duties, serving as a meritorious example of the Armed Forces of the Czech Republic, and for other notable acts of merit performed supporting the Defence department.

The Minister may also present the cross to citizens of foreign nations. The conditions for the award are for notably serving in cooperation with the Defence department, supporting combat readiness in the Czech military, and for activities in support of the Armed Forces of the Czech Republic.

== Appearance ==
The decoration is a straight armed cross pattée 40 mm wide, with linden leaves pointing out superimposed on each arm of the cross. In the center is a circular medallion 15 mm in diameter. The obverse of the medallion depicts the head of a lion, as found on the Czech coat of arms. On the reverse side the medallion contains a Spanish shield divided in half. In the upper field is the upper half of the crowned Czech lion, in the lower field are two crossed swords.

The cross is made of gold colored metal for the first class, the second class is in silver colored metal, and the third class is bronze in appearance. The cross is suspended from a light green ribbon 38 mm wide. The ribbon has thin stripes of green, blue, red and white at one edge and white, red, blue, and green on the other.

The ribbon bars of the various classes are differentiated by a miniature of the cross attached to the ribbon in the appropriate colored metal.

== Notable recipients ==
- Marshall Billingslea
- Wesley Clark
- Euan Edworthy
- Karl Eikenberry
- Štefan Füle
- Jana Hybášková
- Margareta of Romania
- Gregory S. Martin
- Michael I of Romania
- Petr Pavel
- David Petraeus
- Vlastimil Picek
- Nicholas Winton
