= Karen Dewis =

Canadian tennis player

- Country (sports): Canada
- Born: 19 September 1962 (age 62)
- Plays: Right-handed
- Prize money: $16,024

Singles
- Career record: 13–16
- Highest ranking: No. 169 (December 24, 1984)

Grand Slam singles results
- Wimbledon: Q3 (1980)
- US Open: Q2 (1985)
Medal record
Summer Universiade
Gold medal – first place	1983 Edmonton	Women's doubles

Karen Dewis (born 19 September 1962) is a Canadian former professional tennis player.

== Tennis career ==
Dewis featured on the WTA Tour in the 1980s. She reached the final qualifying round at the 1980 Wimbledon Championships and won her first round match at the 1984 Borden Classic.

Between 1980 and 1984 she appeared in a total of six ties for the Canada Federation Cup team. Her only singles win came against Mexico's Alejandra Vallejo, in addition to doubles wins over Yugoslavia and Chile.

A varsity tennis player for the UCLA Bruins, Dewis was a gold medalist for Canada at the 1983 World University Games in Edmonton, partnering Jill Hetherington.

== See also ==
- List of Canada Fed Cup team representatives
