= Emilse Longo =

Argentine tennis player

- Full name: Emilse Raponi Longo
- Country (sports): Argentina; United States
- Born: December 19, 1957 (age 68)
- Prize money: $90,434

Singles
- Career record: 33–55
- Highest ranking: No. 165 (January 4, 1988)

Grand Slam singles results
- French Open: 2R (1979, 1985)
- Wimbledon: 1R (1979)
- US Open: 1R (1979, 1983, 1984, 1985)

Doubles
- Career record: 32–46
- Highest ranking: No. 74 (April 25, 1988)

Grand Slam doubles results
- French Open: 2R (1988)
- US Open: 2R (1983, 1987)

Emilse Raponi Longo (born December 19, 1957) is a former professional tennis player from Argentina.

== Biography ==
=== Tennis career ===
Longo began competing on the professional tour in 1978, as Emilse Raponi. She had early success at her home tournament, the 1978 River Plate Championships, making it through to a WTA Tour final in her first season. En route she upset top seed Regina Maršíková, but was unable to get past Caroline Stoll in the final.

In 1979 she made her debut for Argentina's Fed Cup team and went on to feature in a total of 11 ties for her native country.

From 1980 to 1982 she appeared in only one WTA Tour tournament, but returned to the circuit in 1983. At the 1983 US Open she came up against top seed Martina Navratilova in the opening round and was comfortably beaten. She was a member of the Argentinian side which reached the quarter-finals of the 1983 Fed Cup.

Her best performances in doubles came in 1984 when she partnered with Adriana Villagrán-Reami to finish runner-up in back to back WTA tournaments in Tokyo, the 1984 Borden Classic and 1984 Japan Open Tennis Championships.

She made her last Fed Cup appearances for Argentina in 1984 and partnered in doubles with Gabriela Sabatini in that year's campaign.

=== Personal life ===
In the early 1980s she married American-based Spanish language sportscaster Norberto Longo and according to ITF records began representing the United States later in her career. They remained married until his death in 2003.

== WTA Tour finals ==
=== Singles (0-1) ===
Result	W/L	Date	Tournament	Tier	Surface	Opponent	Score
Loss	0–1	Nov 1978	Buenos Aires, Argentina	$35,000	Clay	(United States) Caroline Stoll	3–6, 2–6

=== Doubles (0-2) ===
Result	W/L	Date	Tournament	Tier	Surface	Partner	Opponents	Score
Loss	0–1	Oct 1984	Borden Classic, Tokyo, Japan	$50,000	Hard	(Argentina) Adriana Villagrán-Reami	(Argentina) Mercedes Paz (United States) Ronni Reis	4–6, 5–7
Loss	0–2	Oct 1984	Japan Open, Tokyo, Japan	$50,000	Hard	(Argentina) Adriana Villagrán-Reami	(United States) Betsy Nagelsen (United States) Candy Reynolds	3–6, 2–6
