= Seth Bonder =

American engineer

- Born: 14 July 1932; Bronx, New York, U.S.
- Died: 29 October 2011 (aged 79); Ann Arbor, Michigan, U.S.
- Spouse(s): Julie and Merrill
- Children: Lisa and Eric
- Parent(s): Al and Minnie Bonder
- Scientific career
- Education: Univ. of Maryland (B.S.); Ohio State University (PhD)
- Thesis: A generalized Lanchester model to predict weapon performance in dynamic combat (1965)
- Military career
- Allegiance: United States of America
- Branch: United States Air Force
- Service years: 1952-1956
- Rank: Captain

Seth Bonder was an American engineer who made substantial contributions in Operations Research for the US military, first as a pilot during the Korean War in the US Air Force and later as a consultant through Vector Research, Inc., a company he founded and later served as its CEO. Amongst his numerous honors includes being named a member of the National Academy of Engineering.

== Early life ==
Seth was born on 14 July 1932 in South Bronx of New York City to Al and Minnie Bonder, his parents who emigrated from Russia and worked in the garment district. In the South Bronx streets, Seth became an accomplished pool, billiards, and basketball player. He graduated from Morris High School, a few years before former United States Secretary of State Colin Powell, who also graduated from there. After high school, he attended the City College of New York, but dropped out in the wake of its 1951 point shaving scandal where its players were caught shaving points during the games. He then went on to driving a truck in the city before enlisting into the U.S. Air Force, later serving for five years as a pilot and leaving in 1956.

== Career ==
After leaving the military, Seth enrolled into the University of Maryland, where he later earned a BS in Mechanical Engineering in 1960. Afterwards, he attended graduate school at Ohio State University as its first Systems Fellow, where he received his PhD in Industrial Engineering (Operations Research) in 1965.

From 1965 to 1972, Dr. Bonder served as a professor in the Department of Industrial Engineering at the University of Michigan. In 1972, he founded the Vector Research, Inc. (VRI), a firm he served for more than 32 year as CEO. VRI grew to employ over 400 professionals in Michigan, Texas, and Washington DC, later merging with other firms into the Altarum Institute.

Seth Bonder was honored in 1986 when the Military Operations Research Society (MORS) awarded him its Vance R. Wanner Memorial Award in 1986, honored again in 1994 when MORS named him a Fellow member, which was the same organization he served as its President. He later was elected to membership in the National Academy of Engineering (NAE) in 2000. He was elected to the 2002 class of Fellows of the Institute for Operations Research and the Management Sciences.

As part of his philanthropic contributions to his profession beginning in 2002, he established the Seth Bonder Scholarship for Applied Operations Research in Military Applications. The Military Applications Society (MAS) of the Institute for Operations Research and the Management Sciences (INFORMS) awards this scholarship each year.

== Personal life ==
Professional tennis player Lisa Bonder, his daughter from his first marriage to Julie, was married for only one month in 1999 to billionaire Kirk Kerkorian, which resulted in a high-profile child support lawsuit.
