= Horní Kalná =

- Municipality
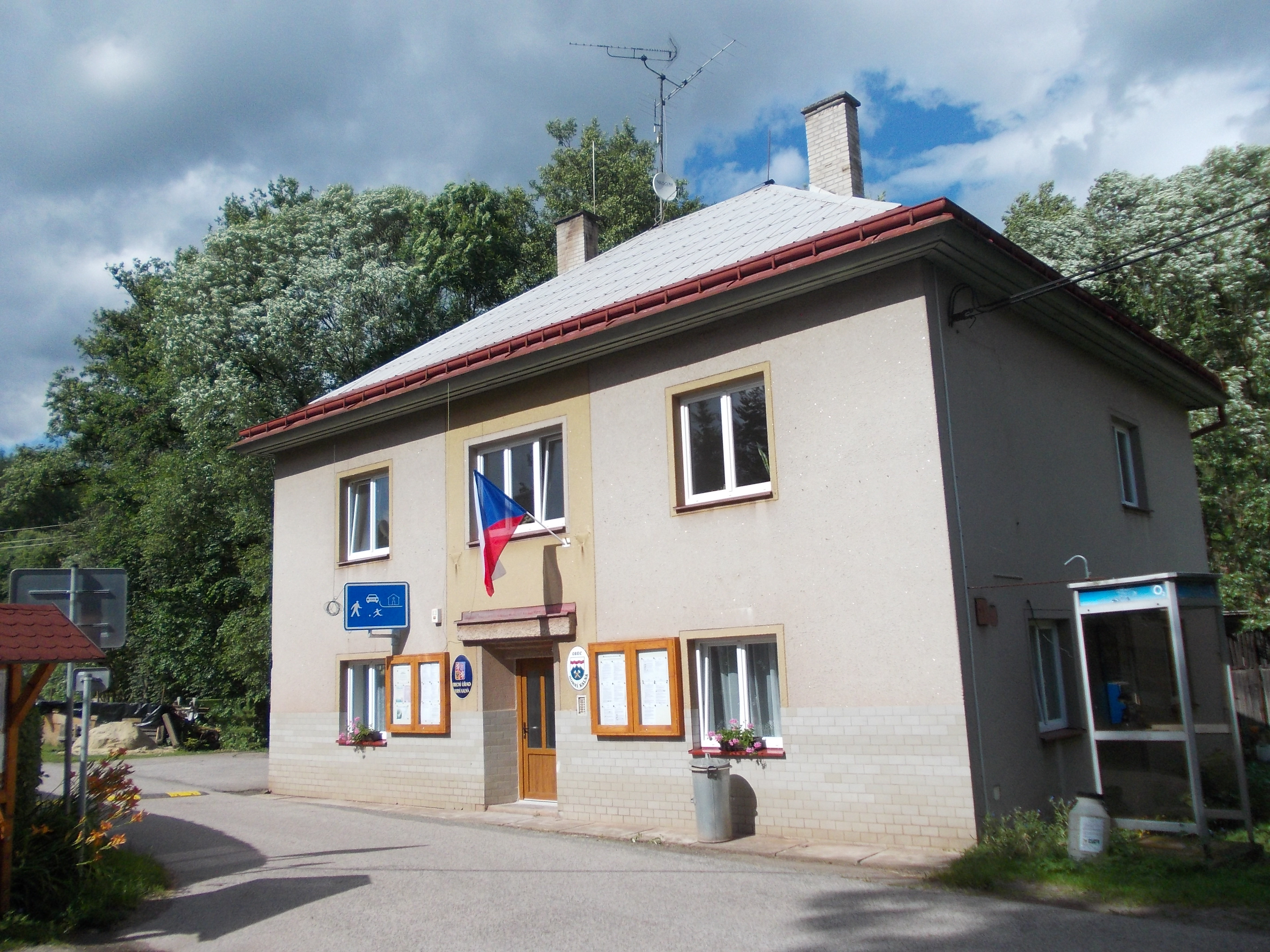
- Municipal office

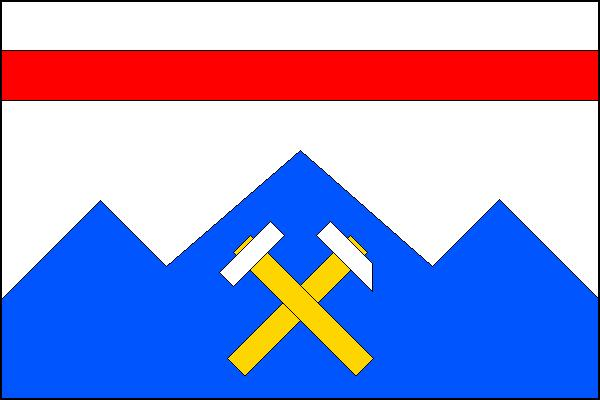
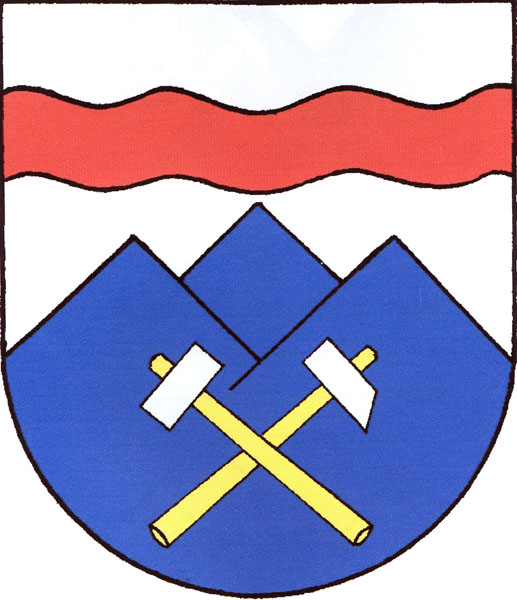
- Flag Coat of arms

- Location in the Czech Republic
- Coordinates: 50°34′8″N 15°36′47″E
- Country: Czech Republic
- Region: Hradec Králové
- District: Trutnov
- First mentioned: 1369

Area
  - Total: 8.92 km^{2} (3.44 sq mi)
- Elevation: 396 m (1,299 ft)

Population (2026-01-01)
  - Total: 370
  - Density: 41/km^{2} (110/sq mi)
- Time zone: UTC+1 (CET)
  - Summer (DST): UTC+2 (CEST)
- Postal code: 543 71
- Website: www.hornikalna.cz

Horní Kalná (German: Ober Kalna) is a municipality and village in Trutnov District in the Hradec Králové Region of the Czech Republic. It has about 400 inhabitants.

== Demographics ==
Historical population
Year	Pop.	±%
1869	1,018	—
1880	1,024	+0.6%
1890	958	−6.4%
1900	973	+1.6%
1910	924	−5.0%
1921	823	−10.9%
1930	780	−5.2%
1950	470	−39.7%
1961	452	−3.8%
1970	406	−10.2%
1980	366	−9.9%
1991	331	−9.6%
2001	323	−2.4%
2011	342	+5.9%
2021	356	+4.1%
Source: Censuses

== Notable people ==
- Petr Čepek (1940–1994), actor; lived here in 1988–1994
