= Pam Whytcross =

Australian tennis player

- Country (sports): Australia
- Born: 25 November 1953 (age 72)
- Turned pro: 1970
- Retired: 1986
- Prize money: US$ 126,973

Singles
- Career record: 6–31
- Career titles: 0
- Highest ranking: No. 75 (1978)

Grand Slam singles results
- Australian Open: 2R (1977 Jan)
- French Open: 3R (1977)
- Wimbledon: 2R (1978)
- US Open: 2R (1977)

Doubles
- Career record: 23–40
- Career titles: 3
- Highest ranking: Top 30 (1983)

Grand Slam doubles results
- Australian Open: F (1978)
- French Open: QF (1977, 1978, 1980)
- Wimbledon: 3R(1977, 1980)
- US Open: 3R (1976, 1977, 1978)

Pam Whytcross (born 25 November 1953) is a former professional tennis player and current tennis official from Australia. Playing internationally from 1973 to 1996, Whytcross won 3 WTA doubles titles and was runner-up with Naoko Satō at the 1978 Australian Open. In singles, she achieved her best Grand Slam result at Roland Garros in 1977, where she reached the third round. Whytcross reached a career-high singles ranking of 75 and ranked among the Top 30 in doubles.

== Career ==
Whytcross began competing in tournaments in 1970 and was also one of the original members of the WTA, which was formed in 1973. She reached her first WTA doubles final in Sydney in January 1974 but had to wait four years before reaching her second at Mahwah, New Jersey in 1978 with partner Barbara Potter.. Also in 1978, she achieved her best Grand Slam result, advancing to the final of the Australian Open in 1978 with partner Naoko Satō, where they lost to Betsy Nagelsen and Renáta Tomanová.

Whytcross subsequently won three WTA doubles titles in 1983, taking titles at the Head Cup in Kitzbühel, Austria in July 1983(with Chris Newton), and in successive weeks in October at two tournaments in Tokyo: the Japan Open and the Borden Classic, (both with Chris O'Neil) and qualified for the year-ending WTA Doubles championships in that year.

Whytcross reached at least the second round at all four Grand Slam singles tournaments with her best result being achieved at 1977, where she advanced to the third round (last 16) before losing to eventual champion Mima Jausovec.

In 1982, Whytcross reached the mixed doubles semifinals (with Chris Johnstone) at 1982 Wimbledon.

At the lower level satellite circuit, Whytcross won a number of singles titles including the Irish Open in 1979 & 1980 and the New Zealand Open in 1979 and 1981

She retired in 1986 at the age of 33.

== Post-tennis career ==
After retiring from playing, Whytcross began a career in officiating with the Women's Tennis Association Women's Tennis Association (WTA), a position she has held for over 35 years. She also was involved with mentoring Australian player Jelena Dokić as part of the Women's Tennis Association (WTA) mentoring scheme. She was appointed Technical Operations Manager for Tennis at the 2000 Summer Olympics and Competition Manager for the 2000 Summer Paralympics

In December 2024 in recognition of her outstanding tennis career, Whytcross was awarded the Spirit of Tennis Award by Tennis Australia. The award recognises an individual who personifies leadership, sportsmanship and goodwill while making a major contribution to the stature of tennis.

== Grand Slam finals ==
=== Doubles: 1 (0–1) ===
Result	Year	Championship	Surface	Partner	Opponents	Score
Loss	1978	Australian Open	Hard	(Japan) Naoko Satō	(United States) Betsy Nagelsen (Czechoslovakia) Renáta Tomanová	5–7, 2–6

== WTA finals ==
=== Doubles (3 wins, 3 losses) ===
Result	W/L	Date	Tournament	Location	Surface	Partner	Opponents	Score
Loss	0–1	Jan 1974	New South Wales Open	Sydney, Australia	Hard	(Australia) Janet Fallis	(United States) Ann Kiyomura (Japan) Kazuko Sawamatsu	3–6, 3–6
Loss	0–2	Aug 1978	Bergen County Classic	Mahwah, U.S.	Hard	(United States) Barbara Potter	(South Africa) Ilana Kloss (South Africa) Marise Kruger	1–6, 3–6
Loss	0–3	Dec 1978	Australian Open	Melbourne, Australia	Hard	(Japan) Naoko Satō	(United States) Betsy Nagelsen (Czechoslovakia) Renáta Tomanová	5–7, 2–6
Win	1–3	Jul 1983	Head Cup	Kitzbühel, Austria	Clay	(New Zealand) Chris Newton	(France) Nathalie Herreman (France) Pascale Paradis	2–6, 6–4, 7–6
Win	2–3	Oct 1983	Borden Classic	Tokyo, Japan	Hard	(Australia) Chris O'Neil	(Australia) Brenda Remilton (Japan) Naoko Satō	5–7, 7–6, 6–3
Win	3–3	Oct 1983	Japan Open	Tokyo, Japan	Hard	(New Zealand) Chris O'Neil	(United States) Helena Manset (United States) Micki Schillig	6–3, 7–5
