= 1984 Borden Classic =

- Date: 1–7 October
- Edition: 6th
- Draw: 32S / 16D
- Prize money: $50,000
- Surface: Hard / outdoor
- Location: Tokyo, Japan

Champions

Singles
- (Japan) Etsuko Inoue

Doubles
- (Argentina) Mercedes Paz / (United States) Ronni Reis
- Borden Classic

The 1984 Borden Classic was a women's tennis tournament played on outdoor hardcourts in Tokyo, Japan that was part of the 1984 Virginia Slims World Championship Series. It was the sixth and last edition of the tournament and was held from 1 October through 7 October 1984. Third-seeded Etsuko Inoue won the singles title.

== Finals ==
=== Singles ===
(Japan) Etsuko Inoue defeated (United States) Beth Herr 6–0, 6–0

- It was Inoue's first title of the year and the 2nd of her career.

=== Doubles ===
(Argentina) Mercedes Paz / (United States) Ronni Reis defeated (Argentina) Emilse Raponi Longo / (Argentina) Adriana Villagrán 6–4, 7–5

- It was Paz's 1st career title, and it was Reis's 1st career title.
