= Naoko Sato =

Japanese tennis player (born 1955)

- Country (sports): Japan
- Born: 2 January 1955 (age 70) Tokyo, Japan
- Prize money: $55,987

Singles
- Career record: 19–42
- Career titles: 0
- Highest ranking: No. 214 (4 July 1983)

Grand Slam singles results
- Australian Open: QF (1977)
- French Open: 2R (1981)
- Wimbledon: 2R (1976)
- US Open: 1R (1981)

Doubles
- Career record: 47–49
- Career titles: 1
- Highest ranking: No. 120 (1 February 1988)

Grand Slam doubles results
- Australian Open: F (1978)
- French Open: QF (1981, 1984)
- Wimbledon: 3R (1981)
- US Open: 2R (1976, 1978)

Grand Slam mixed doubles results
- Wimbledon: 2R (1981, 1985)

Naoko Sato (佐藤 直子, Satō Naoko; born 2 January 1955) is a retired Japanese professional tennis player.

== Career ==
Naoko Sato best results came in the doubles. She reached final of 1978 Australian Open with Pam Whytcross which they lost to Betsy Nagelsen and Renáta Tomanová in straight sets.

== Grand Slam finals ==
=== Doubles: 1 (0–1) ===
Result	Year	Championship	Surface	Partner	Opponents	Score
Loss	1978	Australian Open	Hard	(Australia) Pam Whytcross	(United States) Betsy Nagelsen (Czechoslovakia) Renáta Tomanová	5–7, 2–6

== WTA Tour finals ==
=== Doubles (1–3) ===
Result	W/L	Date	Tournament	Surface	Partner	Opponents	Score
Loss	0–1	Dec 1978	Australian Open, Melbourne	Hard	(Australia) Pam Whytcross	(United States) Betsy Nagelsen (Czechoslovakia) Renáta Tomanová	5–7, 2–6
Win	1–1	Oct 1982	Borden Classic, Tokyo, Japan	Hard	(Australia) Brenda Remilton	(United States) Laura duPont (United States) Barbara Jordan	2–6, 6–3, 6–3
Loss	1–2	Oct 1982	Japan Open, Tokyo, Japan	Hard	(Australia) Brenda Remilton	(United States) Laura duPont (United States) Barbara Jordan	2–6, 7–6, 1–6
Loss	1–3	Oct 1983	Borden Classic, Tokyo, Japan	Hard	(Australia) Brenda Remilton	(Australia) Chris O'Neil (Australia) Pam Whytcross	7–5, 6–7, 3–6
