= Etsuko Inoue =

Japanese tennis player (born 1964)

- Country (sports): Japan
- Born: 18 October 1964 (age 62) Nakano-ku, Tokyo, Japan
- Height: 164 cm (5 ft 5 in)
- Plays: right handed
- Prize money: US$ 292,859

Singles
- Career record: 95–105
- Career titles: 2
- Highest ranking: No. 26 (14 March 1988)

Grand Slam singles results
- Australian Open: 3R (1988)
- French Open: 2R (1983, 1984)
- Wimbledon: 3R (1988)
- US Open: 2R (1983, 1984)

Other tournaments
- Olympic Games: 1R (1984, 1988)

Doubles
- Career record: 20–36
- Highest ranking: No. 34 (2 February 1987)

Grand Slam doubles results
- Australian Open: SF (1987)
- French Open: 2R (1985)
- Wimbledon: 1R (1984, 1987)
- US Open: 1R (1983, 1984, 1985, 1987)

Other doubles tournaments
- Olympic Games: QF (1988)
Medal record
Representing Japan
Women's tennis
Asian Games
Gold medal – first place	1982 New Delhi	Singles
Silver medal – second place	1982 New Delhi	Mixed Doubles
Bronze medal – third place	1982 New Delhi	Doubles
Bronze medal – third place	1982 New Delhi	Team

Etsuko Inoue (井上 悦子, Inoue Etsuko; born October 18, 1964) is a retired tennis player from Japan.

Inoue twice represented her native country at the Summer Olympics: in 1984 (Los Angeles, California) and 1988 (Seoul, South Korea). In 1982, she became the first winner of the women's tennis competition at the Asian Games.

She married Kejiro Kaneshiro in 1993.

== WTA Tour finals ==
=== Singles (2–0) ===
Result	Date	Tournament	Surface	Opponent	Score
Win	Oct 1983	Japan Open, Tokyo	Hard	(United States) Shelley Solomon	7–5, 6–1
Win	Oct 1984	Borden Classic, Tokyo	Hard	(United States) Beth Herr	6–0, 6–0
