= Micki Schillig =

American tennis player

- Full name: Micki Schillig Feldmann
- Country (sports): United States
- Born: November 29, 1960 (age 65)
- Prize money: $39,527

Singles
- Career record: 19–32

Grand Slam singles results
- Wimbledon: 1R (1983)
- US Open: 2R (1982)

Grand Slam doubles results
- US Open: 1R (1984)

Micki Schillig Feldmann (born 29 November 1960) is an American former professional tennis player.

== Biography ==
Schillig comes from Cedar Rapids, Iowa and was a three-time state high school singles champion, before going on to play for San Diego State University (SDSU). During her time at SDSU she was an All-American on three occasions and as a junior in 1982 finished runner-up to Alycia Moulton in the inaugural NCAA singles championship.

From 1983 to 1986 she competed on the professional tour, appearing in the main draws of Wimbledon and the US Open. Schillig's only grand slam win came earlier while she was still an amateur, at the 1982 US Open, where she upset highly ranked opponent Leslie Allen in the first round. Her best performance on the WTA Tour was a semi-final run at the 1983 Borden Classic in Tokyo.

Following her retirement from professional tennis she made the move to coaching and from 1987 to 1995 was head coach of women's tennis at the University of Iowa. She was the Big Ten Coach of the Year in 1990.
