= Lisa Bonder =

American tennis player (born 1965)

- Country (sports): United States
- Born: October 16, 1965 (age 61) Columbus, Ohio, U.S.
- Turned pro: June 21, 1982
- Plays: Right-handed (two-handed backhand)
- Prize money: $510,938

Singles
- Career record: 139–126
- Career titles: 4
- Highest ranking: No. 9 (August 20, 1984)

Grand Slam singles results
- Australian Open: 2R (1985)
- French Open: QF (1984)
- Wimbledon: 4R (1984)
- US Open: 4R (1983, 1984)

Doubles
- Career record: 30–70
- Career titles: 0
- Highest ranking: No. 158 (December 21, 1986)

Lisa Bonder (born October 16, 1965), also known as Lisa Bonder-Kreiss or Lisa Bonder-Kerkorian, is an American former professional tennis player. During her career, she won four singles titles on the WTA circuit and reached a highest ranking of No. 9 in August 1984.

== Career ==
Bonder played on the WTA tour from 1981 to 1991 and won four titles before retiring, the first in 1982 in Hamburg, West Germany, and then three tournaments in Tokyo from 1982 to 1983. She reached the fourth round of the US Open in 1983 and 1984 and at Wimbledon in 1984. She also reached a quarterfinal at Roland Garros in 1984. Notable career victories include wins over Chris Evert, Mary Joe Fernandez, and Andrea Jaeger. Bonder reached a career high ranking of no. 9 and retired with a 139–126 win–loss record.

== Personal life ==
=== Parents ===
Born in Columbus, Ohio to Seth and Julia Bonder, who later divorced, she was raised in Saline, Michigan. Her father Seth, an American engineer who founded Vector Research, Inc., was born in the Bronx, New York to Russian emigrants who worked in the garment district.

=== Change of name and son ===
She married Tom Kreiss on 10 January 1988, and changed her surname to Bonder-Kreiss. She and Kreiss have a son named Taylor Jennings Kreiss. She divorced Kreiss to marry billionaire Kirk Kerkorian in 1999 whom she divorced within one month.

=== Daughter ===
Bonder was involved in a high-profile child support lawsuit with Kirk Kerkorian, her husband for 28 days. Kerkorian, 48 years her senior, suspected that Steve Bing, Bonder's ex-boyfriend, was the father of her daughter. Kerkorian hired Anthony Pellicano, "private eye to the stars", during the dispute. Pellicano took used dental floss from Bing's discarded waste to obtain DNA paternity testing, succeeding in confirming that Bing was the father. Pellicano also wiretapped Bonder's phone calls. Pellicano subsequently was convicted on various charges, including wiretapping and racketeering, involving this case and many other cases, and he received a 15-year prison sentence. One of Kerkorian's attorneys was convicted of racketeering for hiring Pellicano to tap Bonder's phone and received a three-year prison sentence, later confirmed on appeal.

== WTA Career finals ==
=== Singles: 5 (4–1) ===
Legend Grand Slam tournaments (0–0) WTA Tour Championships (0–0) Virginia Slims (4–1)	Finals by surface Hard (2–0) Grass (0–0) Clay (1–1) Carpet (1–0)

Result	W/L	Date	Tournament	Surface	Opponent	Score
Win	1–0	Jul 1982	Hamburg, West Germany	Clay	(Czechoslovakia) Renáta Tomanová	6–3, 6–2
Win	2–0	Oct 1982	Tokyo, Japan	Hard	(United States) Shelley Solomon	2–6, 6–0, 6–3
Win	3–0	Sep 1983	Tokyo, Japan	Carpet (i)	(United States) Andrea Jaeger	6–2, 5–7, 6–1
Win	4–0	Oct 1983	Tokyo, Japan	Hard	(Peru) Laura Arraya	6–1, 6–3
Loss	4–1	Aug 1984	Indianapolis, US	Clay	(Bulgaria) Manuela Maleeva	4–6, 3–6

=== Doubles: 1 (0–1) ===
Legend Grand Slam tournaments (0–0) WTA Tour Championships (0–0) Virginia Slims (0–0)	Finals by surface Hard (0–1) Grass (0–0) Clay (0–0) Carpet (0–0)

Result	W/L	Date	Tournament	Surface	Partner	Opponents	Score
Loss	0–1	Nov 1985	Tampa, US	Hard	(Peru) Laura Gildemeister	(Canada) Carling Bassett (Argentina) Gabriela Sabatini	0–6, 0–6

== Grand Slam singles performance timeline ==
Key
W	F	SF	QF	#R	RR	Q#	DNQ	A	NH

(W) winner; (F) finalist; (SF) semifinalist; (QF) quarterfinalist; (#R) rounds 4, 3, 2, 1; (RR) round-robin stage; (Q#) qualification round; (DNQ) did not qualify; (A) absent; (NH) not held; (SR) strike rate (events won / competed); (W–L) win–loss record.

Tournament	1981	1982	1983	1984	1985	1986	1987	1988	1989	1990	1991	Career SR
Australian Open	A	A	A	A	2R	NH	A	A	A	A	A	0 / 1
French Open	A	3R	3R	QF	2R	3R	2R	1R	A	A	A	0 / 7
Wimbledon	A	1R	4R	3R	1R	2R	1R	A	A	A	1R	0 / 7
US Open	1R	2R	4R	4R	2R	3R	3R	1R	A	A	1R	0 / 9
SR	0 / 1	0 / 3	0 / 3	0 / 3	0 / 4	0 / 3	0 / 3	0 / 2	0 / 0	0 / 0	0 / 2	0 / 24
Year-end ranking	122	41	34	16	36	55	49	126	300	303	110	
