= 1983 Virginia Slims World Championship Series =

Women's tennis circuit

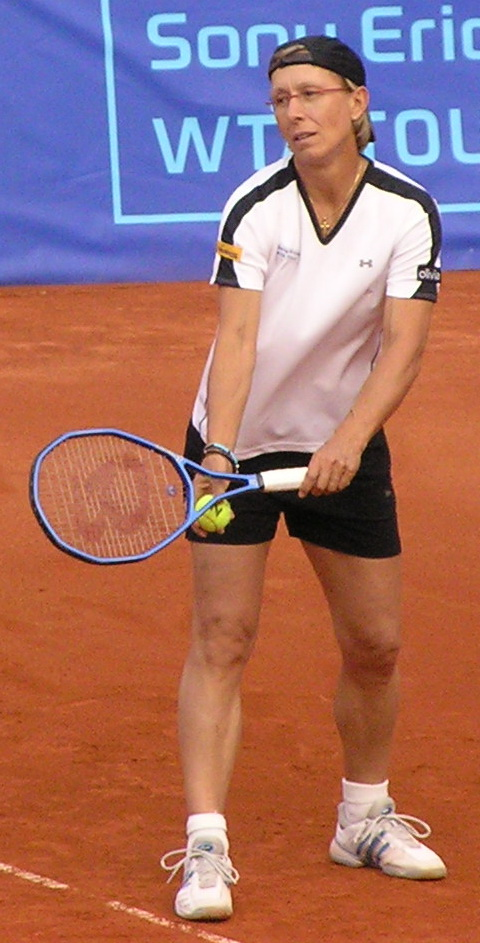
- Martina Navratilova finished the year as world No. 1 for the fourth time in her career. She won 18 singles tournaments during the season, including three majors at the Wimbledon Championships, the US Open, and the Australian Open, as well as the Virginia Slims Championships.

Details
- Duration: 3 January 1983 – 4 March 1984
- Edition: 11th
- Tournaments: 64
- Categories: Grand Slam (4); WTA Championships (2); Category 4 (5); Category 3 (23); Category 2 (8); Category 1+ (14); Category 1 (3)

Achievements (singles)
- Most titles: (United States) Martina Navratilova (18)
- Most finals: (United States) Martina Navratilova (19)
- Prize money leader: (United States) Martina Navratilova ($1,456,030)
- Points leader: (United States) Martina Navratilova (19.606)

Awards
- Player of the year: (United States) Martina Navratilova
- Doubles team of the year: (United States) Martina Navratilova; (United States) Pam Shriver
- Most improved player of the year: (Hungary) Andrea Temesvári
- Newcomer of the year: (Canada) Carling Bassett

The 1983 Virginia Slims World Championship Series was the 11th season since the foundation of the Women's Tennis Association. It commenced on January 3, 1983, and concluded on March 4, 1984, after 64 events.

The Virginia Slims World Championship Series was the elite tour for professional women's tennis organised by the Women's Tennis Association (WTA). It was the first unified global women's circuit in the Open Era and featured tournaments that had previously been part of the Toyota Series and the Avon Series. The circuit consisted of 48 tournaments in nine countries, including the four Grand Slam tournaments, and culminated in the season-ending Virginia Slims Championships played in February 1984. ITF tournaments were not part of the tour, although they awarded points for the WTA World Ranking.

Martina Navratilova was the most successful player in both singles and doubles across the season. She won three of the four Grand Slam tournaments in singles, with Chris Evert-Lloyd winning the French Open. In doubles, Navratilova again won all the Grand Slams apart from the French Open, which was collected by Rosalyn Fairbank and Candy Reynolds; Pam Shriver was her partner in all the Grand Slam events. Navratilova won a total of 29 titles in the course of the year and only suffered one defeat in singles, against Kathy Horvath at the French Open. This led to her beginning and ending the year as the WTA number 1. Shriver was her closest challenger with 16 titles, including 14 in doubles events. Players from the United States won 74 of the 125 titles awarded in singles, doubles and mixed doubles; players from Brazil, Canada, Japan, New Zealand, Netherlands and Switzerland each won a solitary title.

== Tour changes ==
Avon, who had been the sponsors of the January to March U.S. winter circuit of the WTA Tour since 1978, announced in 1982 that they would be trimming back their sponsorship of the tour. Toyota, who sponsored the international tour for the remaining nine months of the season, also withdrew their support. The 1983 season saw Virginia Slims returning to sponsor a unified worldwide tour after an absence of four years. The company sponsored events between 1970 and 1978 but withdrew their support following disagreements with the organisers of the WTA Tour, the Women's Tennis Association. However the company decided to associate themselves with the women's tennis circuit again in 1983. The tour was therefore known as the Virginia Slims World Championship Series, with 18 events including the US Open held in the United States and a further 12 events in six other countries incorporated under the Virginia Slims brand in a merged season.

== Season summary ==
=== Singles ===
World number-one singles player Martina Navratilova, who had won 90 out of 93 matches the previous year, began the 1983 season in great form, winning successive titles in Washington and Houston, defeating Sylvia Hanika in the final on both occasions. The third best player in the world, Andrea Jaeger, won the tournament at Marco Island in Florida; Chris Evert-Lloyd, the world number two, took the title at Palm Beach, also in Florida.

== Schedule ==
The table below shows the 1983 Virginia Slims World Championship Series schedule.

Key

Grand Slam tournaments
Year-end championships
Category 4 events
Category 3 events
Category 2 events
Category 1+ and 1 events
Team events

=== January ===
Week	Tournament	Champions	Runners-up	Semifinalists	Quarterfinalists
3 Jan	Virginia Slims of Washington; Washington, United States; Category 3 Carpet (i) – $150,000 – 32S/16D; Singles – Doubles	(United States) Martina Navratilova; 6–1, 6–1	(West Germany) Sylvia Hanika	(United States) Mary Lou Piatek (United States) Andrea Jaeger	(Czechoslovakia) Helena Suková (United States) Barbara Potter: (Czechoslovakia) Hana Mandlíková; (United States) JoAnne Russell
3 Jan	Virginia Slims of Washington; Washington, United States; Category 3 Carpet (i) – $150,000 – 32S/16D; Singles – Doubles	(United States) Martina Navratilova; (United States) Pam Shriver; 4–6, 7–5, 6–3	(United States) Kathy Jordan; (United States) Anne Smith	(United States) Mary Lou Piatek (United States) Andrea Jaeger	(Czechoslovakia) Helena Suková (United States) Barbara Potter: (Czechoslovakia) Hana Mandlíková; (United States) JoAnne Russell
10 Jan	Virginia Slims of Houston; Houston, United States; Category 3 Carpet (i) – $150,000 – 32S/16D/32Q; Singles – Doubles	(United States) Martina Navratilova; 6–3, 7–6^{(7–5)}	(West Germany) Sylvia Hanika	(United States) Tracy Austin (West Germany) Eva Pfaff	(West Germany) Bettina Bunge (United States) Anne Smith: (United States) Pam Shriver; (United States) Zina Garrison
10 Jan	Virginia Slims of Houston; Houston, United States; Category 3 Carpet (i) – $150,000 – 32S/16D/32Q; Singles – Doubles	(United States) Martina Navratilova; (United States) Pam Shriver; 6–4, 6–3	(United Kingdom) Jo Durie; (United States) Barbara Potter	(United States) Tracy Austin (West Germany) Eva Pfaff	(West Germany) Bettina Bunge (United States) Anne Smith: (United States) Pam Shriver; (United States) Zina Garrison
24 Jan	Avon Cup; Marco Island, United States; Category 2 Clay – $100,000 – 56S/28D; Singles – Doubles	(United States) Andrea Jaeger; 6–1, 6–3	(Czechoslovakia) Hana Mandlíková	(Hungary) Andrea Temesvári (United States) Michelle Casati	(Australia) Dianne Balestrat (Romania) Virginia Ruzici: (United States) Zina Garrison; (United States) Kathy Rinaldi
24 Jan	Avon Cup; Marco Island, United States; Category 2 Clay – $100,000 – 56S/28D; Singles – Doubles	(United States) Andrea Jaeger; (United States) Mary Lou Piatek; 7–5, 6–4	(United States) Rosie Casals; (Australia) Wendy Turnbull	(Hungary) Andrea Temesvári (United States) Michelle Casati	(Australia) Dianne Balestrat (Romania) Virginia Ruzici: (United States) Zina Garrison; (United States) Kathy Rinaldi
31 Jan	Murjani Cup; Palm Beach Gardens, United States; Category 3 Clay – $150,000 – 56S/32D; Singles – Doubles	(United States) Chris Evert-Lloyd; 6–3, 6–3	(United States) Andrea Jaeger	(Australia) Wendy Turnbull (Czechoslovakia) Hana Mandlíková	(Hungary) Andrea Temesvári (Czechoslovakia) Iva Budařová: (South Africa) Rosalyn Fairbank; (United States) Zina Garrison
31 Jan	Murjani Cup; Palm Beach Gardens, United States; Category 3 Clay – $150,000 – 56S/32D; Singles – Doubles	(United States) Barbara Potter; (United States) Sharon Walsh; 6–4, 4–6, 6–2	(United States) Kathy Jordan; (United States) Paula Smith	(Australia) Wendy Turnbull (Czechoslovakia) Hana Mandlíková	(Hungary) Andrea Temesvári (Czechoslovakia) Iva Budařová: (South Africa) Rosalyn Fairbank; (United States) Zina Garrison

=== February ===
Week	Tournament	Champions	Runners-up	Semifinalists	Quarterfinalists
7 Feb	Virginia Slims of Indianapolis; Indianapolis, United States; Ginny Circuit – Category 1+ Hard (i) – $50,000 – 32S/16D/64Q; Singles – Doubles	(United Kingdom) Anne Hobbs; 6–4, 6–7, 6–4	(United States) Ginny Purdy	(South Africa) Yvonne Vermaak (Czechoslovakia) Iva Budařová	(United States) Candy Reynolds (Switzerland) Christiane Jolissaint: (Sweden) Catarina Lindqvist; (United States) Peanut Louie
7 Feb	Virginia Slims of Indianapolis; Indianapolis, United States; Ginny Circuit – Category 1+ Hard (i) – $50,000 – 32S/16D/64Q; Singles – Doubles	(United States) Lea Antonoplis; (United States) Barbara Jordan; 5–7, 6–4, 7–5	(South Africa) Rosalyn Fairbank; (United States) Candy Reynolds	(South Africa) Yvonne Vermaak (Czechoslovakia) Iva Budařová	(United States) Candy Reynolds (Switzerland) Christiane Jolissaint: (Sweden) Catarina Lindqvist; (United States) Peanut Louie
14 Feb	Virginia Slims of Chicago; Chicago, United States; Category 3 Carpet (i) – $150,000 – 32S/16D; Singles – Doubles	(United States) Martina Navratilova; 6–3, 6–2	(United States) Andrea Jaeger	(United States) Pam Shriver (United States) Tracy Austin	(Netherlands) Marcella Mesker (West Germany) Bettina Bunge (Australia) Wendy Turnbull (West Germany) Eva Pfaff
14 Feb	Virginia Slims of Chicago; Chicago, United States; Category 3 Carpet (i) – $150,000 – 32S/16D; Singles – Doubles	(United States) Martina Navratilova; (United States) Pam Shriver; 6–1, 6–2	(United States) Kathy Jordan; (United States) Anne Smith	(United States) Pam Shriver (United States) Tracy Austin	(Netherlands) Marcella Mesker (West Germany) Bettina Bunge (Australia) Wendy Turnbull (West Germany) Eva Pfaff
14 Feb	Virginia Slims of Pennsylvania; Hershey, United States; Ginny Circuit – Category 1+ Carpet (i) – $50,000 – 32S/16D; Singles – Doubles	(Canada) Carling Bassett; 2–6, 6–0, 6–4	(United States) Sandy Collins	(United States) Anne White (United States) Julie Harrington	(Sweden) Catrin Jexell (South Africa) Beverly Mould (United States) Peanut Louie (United States) Lea Antonoplis
14 Feb	Virginia Slims of Pennsylvania; Hershey, United States; Ginny Circuit – Category 1+ Carpet (i) – $50,000 – 32S/16D; Singles – Doubles	(South Africa) Beverly Mould; (Australia) Elizabeth Sayers; 7–6, 4–6, 7–5	(South Africa) Rosalyn Fairbank; (Australia) Susan Leo	(United States) Anne White (United States) Julie Harrington	(Sweden) Catrin Jexell (South Africa) Beverly Mould (United States) Peanut Louie (United States) Lea Antonoplis
21 Feb	Ridgewood Open; Ridgewood, United States; Ginny Circuit – Category 1+ Carpet (i) – $50,000 – 32S/16D; Singles – Doubles	(United States) Alycia Moulton; 6–4, 6–2	(Sweden) Catrin Jexell	(Peru) Laura Arraya (Netherlands) Marcella Mesker	(France) Corinne Vanier (Australia) Susan Leo (Sweden) Lena Sandin (Switzerland) Petra Delhees
21 Feb	Ridgewood Open; Ridgewood, United States; Ginny Circuit – Category 1+ Carpet (i) – $50,000 – 32S/16D; Singles – Doubles	(United States) Lea Antonoplis; (United States) Barbara Jordan; 6–3, 6–4	(United States) Sherry Acker; (United States) Ann Henricksson	(Peru) Laura Arraya (Netherlands) Marcella Mesker	(France) Corinne Vanier (Australia) Susan Leo (Sweden) Lena Sandin (Switzerland) Petra Delhees
21 Feb	Virginia Slims of California; Oakland, United States; Category 3 Carpet (i) – $150,000 – 32S/16D; Singles – Doubles	(West Germany) Bettina Bunge; 6–3, 6–3	(West Germany) Sylvia Hanika	(Hungary) Andrea Temesvári (Australia) Wendy Turnbull	(United States) Tracy Austin (West Germany) Claudia Kohde-Kilsch (United States) Anne Smith (United States) Pam Shriver
21 Feb	Virginia Slims of California; Oakland, United States; Category 3 Carpet (i) – $150,000 – 32S/16D; Singles – Doubles	(West Germany) Claudia Kohde-Kilsch; (West Germany) Eva Pfaff; 6–4, 4–6, 6–4	(United States) Rosemary Casals; (Australia) Wendy Turnbull	(Hungary) Andrea Temesvári (Australia) Wendy Turnbull	(United States) Tracy Austin (West Germany) Claudia Kohde-Kilsch (United States) Anne Smith (United States) Pam Shriver
28 Feb	Congoleum Classic; Palm Springs, United States; Category 1 Hard – $50,000 – 32S/16D; Singles – Doubles	(South Africa) Yvonne Vermaak; 6–3, 7–5	(Canada) Carling Bassett	(United States) Kathy Jordan (United States) Michelle Torres	(Czechoslovakia) Hana Mandlíková (United States) Kathy Rinaldi (United States) Wendy White (West Germany) Sylvia Hanika
28 Feb	Congoleum Classic; Palm Springs, United States; Category 1 Hard – $50,000 – 32S/16D; Singles – Doubles	(United States) Kathy Jordan; (United States) Ann Kiyomura; 6–2, 6–4	(Australia) Dianne Fromholtz; (Netherlands) Betty Stöve	(United States) Kathy Jordan (United States) Michelle Torres	(Czechoslovakia) Hana Mandlíková (United States) Kathy Rinaldi (United States) Wendy White (West Germany) Sylvia Hanika
28 Feb	Virginia Slims of Nashville; Nashville, United States; Ginny Circuit – Category 1+ Carpet (i) – $50,000 – 32S/16D; Singles – Doubles	(United States) Kathleen Horvath; 6–4, 6–3	(Czechoslovakia) Marcela Skuherská	(United States) Sherry Acker (Hong Kong) Patricia Hy	(Czechoslovakia) Iva Budařová (United States) Vicki Nelson Dunbar: (United States) Kim Sands; (United States) Jenny Klitch
28 Feb	Virginia Slims of Nashville; Nashville, United States; Ginny Circuit – Category 1+ Carpet (i) – $50,000 – 32S/16D; Singles – Doubles	(South Africa) Rosalyn Fairbank; (United States) Candy Reynolds; 6–4, 7–6	(United States) Alycia Moulton; (United States) Paula Smith	(United States) Sherry Acker (Hong Kong) Patricia Hy	(Czechoslovakia) Iva Budařová (United States) Vicki Nelson Dunbar: (United States) Kim Sands; (United States) Jenny Klitch

=== March ===
Week	Tournament	Champions	Runners-up	Semifinalists	Quarterfinalists
7 Mar	Virginia Slims of Dallas; Dallas, United States; Category 3 Carpet (i) – $150,000 – 32S/16D; Singles – Doubles	(United States) Martina Navratilova; 6–4, 6–0	(United States) Chris Evert-Lloyd	(West Germany) Bettina Bunge (United States) Pam Shriver	(Czechoslovakia) Hana Mandlíková (Australia) Wendy Turnbull: (United Kingdom) Jo Durie; (West Germany) Sylvia Hanika
7 Mar	Virginia Slims of Dallas; Dallas, United States; Category 3 Carpet (i) – $150,000 – 32S/16D; Singles – Doubles	(United States) Martina Navratilova; (United States) Pam Shriver; 6–3, 6–2	(United States) Rosie Casals; (Australia) Wendy Turnbull	(West Germany) Bettina Bunge (United States) Pam Shriver	(Czechoslovakia) Hana Mandlíková (Australia) Wendy Turnbull: (United Kingdom) Jo Durie; (West Germany) Sylvia Hanika
7 Mar	Pittsburgh Open; Pittsburgh, United States; Ginny Circuit – Category 1+ Carpet (i) – $50,000 – 32S/16D; Singles – Doubles	(United States) Ginny Purdy; 6–2, 7–5	(Brazil) Cláudia Monteiro	(United States) Betsy Nagelsen (United States) Amy Holton	(Peru) Pilar Vásquez (United States) Gretchen Magers (United States) Beth Norton (United States) Candy Reynolds
7 Mar	Pittsburgh Open; Pittsburgh, United States; Ginny Circuit – Category 1+ Carpet (i) – $50,000 – 32S/16D; Singles – Doubles	(United States) Candy Reynolds; (United States) Paula Smith; 6–3, 6–2	(Poland) Iwona Kuczyńska; (United States) Trey Lewis	(United States) Betsy Nagelsen (United States) Amy Holton	(Peru) Pilar Vásquez (United States) Gretchen Magers (United States) Beth Norton (United States) Candy Reynolds
14 Mar	Virginia Slims of Boston; Boston, United States; Category 3 Carpet (i) – $150,000 – 32S/16D; Singles – Doubles	(Australia) Wendy Turnbull; 4–6, 3–6, 6–4	(West Germany) Sylvia Hanika	(United States) Billie Jean King (United States) Tracy Austin	(United States) Kathleen Horvath (United States) Wendy White: (United States) Barbara Potter; (United States) Betsy Nagelsen
14 Mar	Virginia Slims of Boston; Boston, United States; Category 3 Carpet (i) – $150,000 – 32S/16D; Singles – Doubles	(United Kingdom) Jo Durie; (United States) Ann Kiyomura; 6–1, 6–2	(United States) Kathy Jordan; (United States) Anne Smith	(United States) Billie Jean King (United States) Tracy Austin	(United States) Kathleen Horvath (United States) Wendy White: (United States) Barbara Potter; (United States) Betsy Nagelsen
21 Mar	Virginia Slims Championships; New York City, United States; Carpet (i) – $350,000 – 16S/6D; Singles – Doubles	(United States) Martina Navratilova; 6–2, 6–0	(United States) Chris Evert-Lloyd	(United States) Billie Jean King (West Germany) Sylvia Hanika	(United States) Pam Shriver (United States) Tracy Austin: (United States) Barbara Potter; (West Germany) Bettina Bunge
21 Mar	Virginia Slims Championships; New York City, United States; Carpet (i) – $350,000 – 16S/6D; Singles – Doubles	(United States) Martina Navratilova; (United States) Pam Shriver; 7–5, 6–2	(West Germany) Claudia Kohde-Kilsch; (West Germany) Eva Pfaff	(United States) Billie Jean King (West Germany) Sylvia Hanika	(United States) Pam Shriver (United States) Tracy Austin: (United States) Barbara Potter; (West Germany) Bettina Bunge
28 Mar	Bridgestone Doubles Championships; Tokyo, Japan; Carpet (i) – $150,000 – 8D; Doubles	(United States) Billie Jean King (United States) Sharon Walsh; 6–1, 6–1	(United States) Kathy Jordan (United States) Anne Smith	(United States) Kiyomura / (United States) Smith (United States) Allen / (Socialist Federal Republic of Yugoslavia) Jaušovec	(United States) Antonoplis / (United States) Jordan (United Kingdom) Hobbs / (Australia) Leo (Brazil) Medrado / (Brazil) Monteiro (United States) Casals / (Australia) Turnbull

=== April ===
Week	Tournament	Champions	Runners-up	Semifinalists	Quarterfinalists
4 Apr	Family Circle Cup; Hilton Head Island, United States; Category 4 Clay – $200,000 – 56S/32D; Singles – Doubles	(United States) Martina Navratilova; 5–7, 6–1, 6–0	(United States) Tracy Austin	(West Germany) Bettina Bunge (United States) Andrea Jaeger	(Hungary) Andrea Temesvári (West Germany) Sylvia Hanika: (Bulgaria) Manuela Maleeva; (Romania) Virginia Ruzici
4 Apr	Family Circle Cup; Hilton Head Island, United States; Category 4 Clay – $200,000 – 56S/32D; Singles – Doubles	(United States) Martina Navratilova; (United States) Candy Reynolds; 7–5, 6–2	(West Germany) Andrea Jaeger; (United States) Paula Smith	(West Germany) Bettina Bunge (United States) Andrea Jaeger	(Hungary) Andrea Temesvári (West Germany) Sylvia Hanika: (Bulgaria) Manuela Maleeva; (Romania) Virginia Ruzici
11 Apr	Murjani WTA Championships; Amelia Island, United States; Category 4 Clay – $250,000 – 56S/32D; Singles – Doubles	(United States) Chris Evert-Lloyd; 6–3, 2–6, 7–5	(Canada) Carling Bassett	(Czechoslovakia) Hana Mandlíková (United States) Kathy Rinaldi	(West Germany) Sylvia Hanika (United States) Michelle Casati: (West Germany) Bettina Bunge; (Italy) Raffaella Reggi
11 Apr	Murjani WTA Championships; Amelia Island, United States; Category 4 Clay – $250,000 – 56S/32D; Singles – Doubles	(South Africa) Rosalyn Fairbank; (United States) Candy Reynolds; 6–4, 6–2	(Czechoslovakia) Hana Mandlíková; (Romania) Virginia Ruzici	(Czechoslovakia) Hana Mandlíková (United States) Kathy Rinaldi	(West Germany) Sylvia Hanika (United States) Michelle Casati: (West Germany) Bettina Bunge; (Italy) Raffaella Reggi
18 Apr	United Airlines Tournament of Champions; Orlando, United States; Category 4 Clay – $200,000 – 22S/8D; Singles – Doubles	(United States) Martina Navratilova; 6–1, 7–5	(United States) Andrea Jaeger	(Czechoslovakia) Hana Mandlíková (Australia) Wendy Turnbull	(South Africa) Yvonne Vermaak (United States) Billie Jean King: (United States) Barbara Potter; (Romania) Virginia Ruzici
18 Apr	United Airlines Tournament of Champions; Orlando, United States; Category 4 Clay – $200,000 – 22S/8D; Singles – Doubles	(United States) Billie Jean King; (United States) Anne Smith; 6–3, 1–6, 7–6^{(11–9)}	(United States) Martina Navratilova; (United States) Pam Shriver	(Czechoslovakia) Hana Mandlíková (Australia) Wendy Turnbull	(South Africa) Yvonne Vermaak (United States) Billie Jean King: (United States) Barbara Potter; (Romania) Virginia Ruzici
25 Apr	Virginia Slims of Atlanta; Atlanta, United States; Category 3 Hard – $150,000 – 32S/16D; Singles – Doubles	(United States) Pam Shriver; 6–2, 6–0	(United States) Kathy Jordan	(United States) Anne White (Australia) Wendy Turnbull	(United States) Lele Forood (United States) Kim Steinmetz: (United States) Anne Smith; (United States) Andrea Leand
25 Apr	Virginia Slims of Atlanta; Atlanta, United States; Category 3 Hard – $150,000 – 32S/16D; Singles – Doubles	(United States) Alycia Moulton; (United States) Sharon Walsh; 6–3, 7–6	(Australia) Rosie Casals; (Australia) Wendy Turnbull	(United States) Anne White (Australia) Wendy Turnbull	(United States) Lele Forood (United States) Kim Steinmetz: (United States) Anne Smith; (United States) Andrea Leand

=== May ===
Week	Tournament	Champions	Runners-up	Semifinalists	Quarterfinalists
2 May	Italian Open; Perugia, Italy; Category 3 Clay – $150,000 – 56S/32D; Singles – Doubles	(Hungary) Andrea Temesvári; 6–1, 6–0	(United States) Bonnie Gadusek	(United States) Kathleen Horvath (United States) Kathy Rinaldi	(Canada) Christiane Jolissaint (United Kingdom) Jo Durie: (Czechoslovakia) Helena Suková; (Peru) Laura Arraya
2 May	Italian Open; Perugia, Italy; Category 3 Clay – $150,000 – 56S/32D; Singles – Doubles	(Romania) Virginia Ruzici; (United Kingdom) Virginia Wade; 6–3, 2–6, 6–1	(Argentina) Ivanna Madruga-Osses; (France) Catherine Tanvier	(United States) Kathleen Horvath (United States) Kathy Rinaldi	(Canada) Christiane Jolissaint (United Kingdom) Jo Durie: (Czechoslovakia) Helena Suková; (Peru) Laura Arraya
9 May	Swiss Open; Lugano, Switzerland; Category 2 Clay – $100,000 – 64S/32D	The singles event was cancelled after the third round due to rain.^{[A]}			
9 May	Swiss Open; Lugano, Switzerland; Category 2 Clay – $100,000 – 64S/32D	(Switzerland) Christiane Jolissaint; (Netherlands) Marcella Mesker; 6–2, 3–6, 7–5	(Switzerland) Petra Delhees; (Brazil) Patricia Medrado		
16 May	German Open; West Berlin, West Germany; Category 3 Clay – $150,000 – 56S/29D	(United States) Chris Evert-Lloyd; 6–4, 7–6^{(7–3)}	(United States) Kathleen Horvath	(Czechoslovakia) Helena Suková (United States) Andrea Jaeger	(United States) Pam Casale (West Germany) Sylvia Hanika: (West Germany) Bettina Bunge; (West Germany) Claudia Kohde-Kilsch
16 May	German Open; West Berlin, West Germany; Category 3 Clay – $150,000 – 56S/29D	(United Kingdom) Jo Durie; (United Kingdom) Anne Hobbs; 6–4, 7–6^{(7–2)}	(West Germany) Claudia Kohde-Kilsch (West Germany) Eva Pfaff	(Czechoslovakia) Helena Suková (United States) Andrea Jaeger	(United States) Pam Casale (West Germany) Sylvia Hanika: (West Germany) Bettina Bunge; (West Germany) Claudia Kohde-Kilsch
23 May	French Open; Paris, France; Grand Slam; Clay – $625,000 – 128S/64Q/64D/48X; Singles – Doubles – Mixed doubles	(United States) Chris Evert-Lloyd; 6–1, 6–2	(Socialist Federal Republic of Yugoslavia) Mima Jaušovec	(United Kingdom) Jo Durie (United States) Andrea Jaeger	(United States) Kathleen Horvath (United States) Tracy Austin (United States) Gretchen Magers (Czechoslovakia) Hana Mandlíková
23 May	French Open; Paris, France; Grand Slam; Clay – $625,000 – 128S/64Q/64D/48X; Singles – Doubles – Mixed doubles	(South Africa) Rosalyn Fairbank; (United States) Candy Reynolds; 5–7, 7–5, 6–3	(United States) Kathy Jordan (United States) Anne Smith	(United Kingdom) Jo Durie (United States) Andrea Jaeger	(United States) Kathleen Horvath (United States) Tracy Austin (United States) Gretchen Magers (Czechoslovakia) Hana Mandlíková
23 May	French Open; Paris, France; Grand Slam; Clay – $625,000 – 128S/64Q/64D/48X; Singles – Doubles – Mixed doubles	(United States) Barbara Jordan; (United States) Eliot Teltscher; 6–2, 6–3	(United States) Leslie Allen (United States) Charles Buzz Strode	(United Kingdom) Jo Durie (United States) Andrea Jaeger	(United States) Kathleen Horvath (United States) Tracy Austin (United States) Gretchen Magers (Czechoslovakia) Hana Mandlíková

=== June ===
Week	Tournament	Champions	Runners-up	Semifinalists	Quarterfinalists
6 Jun	Edgbaston Cup; Birmingham, Great Britain; Category 2 Grass – $100,000 – 56S/32D; Singles – Doubles	(United States) Billie Jean King; 6–3, 7–5	(United States) Alycia Moulton	(United States) Anne White (United States) Zina Garrison	(Australia) Elizabeth Sayers (South Africa) Yvonne Vermaak: (United States) Nancy Yeargin; (United States) Sharon Walsh
6 Jun	Edgbaston Cup; Birmingham, Great Britain; Category 2 Grass – $100,000 – 56S/32D; Singles – Doubles	(United States) Billie Jean King; (United States) Sharon Walsh; 5–7, 6–4, 7–5	(South Africa) Beverly Mould; (Australia) Elizabeth Sayers	(United States) Anne White (United States) Zina Garrison	(Australia) Elizabeth Sayers (South Africa) Yvonne Vermaak: (United States) Nancy Yeargin; (United States) Sharon Walsh
13 Jun	BMW Championships; Eastbourne, Great Britain; Category 3 Grass – $150,000 – 64S/32D; Singles – Doubles	(United States) Martina Navratilova; 6–1, 6–1	(Australia) Wendy Turnbull	(United States) Zina Garrison (United States) Tracy Austin	(United Kingdom) Jo Durie (West Germany) Bettina Bunge: (United States) Beth Herr; (United States) Andrea Jaeger
13 Jun	BMW Championships; Eastbourne, Great Britain; Category 3 Grass – $150,000 – 64S/32D; Singles – Doubles	(United States) Martina Navratilova; (United States) Pam Shriver; 6–1, 6–0	(United Kingdom) Jo Durie; (United Kingdom) Anne Hobbs	(United States) Zina Garrison (United States) Tracy Austin	(United Kingdom) Jo Durie (West Germany) Bettina Bunge: (United States) Beth Herr; (United States) Andrea Jaeger
20 Jun	Wimbledon Championships; London, Great Britain; Grand Slam; Grass – $670,000 – 128S/64Q/56D/56X; Singles – Doubles – Mixed doubles	(United States) Martina Navratilova; 6–0, 6–3	(United States) Andrea Jaeger	(South Africa) Yvonne Vermaak (United States) Billie Jean King	(South Africa) Jennifer Mundel-Reinbold (United Kingdom) Virginia Wade (United States) Barbara Potter (United States) Kathy Jordan
20 Jun	Wimbledon Championships; London, Great Britain; Grand Slam; Grass – $670,000 – 128S/64Q/56D/56X; Singles – Doubles – Mixed doubles	(United States) Martina Navratilova; (United States) Pam Shriver; 6–2, 6–2	(United States) Rosie Casals (Australia) Wendy Turnbull	(South Africa) Yvonne Vermaak (United States) Billie Jean King	(South Africa) Jennifer Mundel-Reinbold (United Kingdom) Virginia Wade (United States) Barbara Potter (United States) Kathy Jordan
20 Jun	Wimbledon Championships; London, Great Britain; Grand Slam; Grass – $670,000 – 128S/64Q/56D/56X; Singles – Doubles – Mixed doubles	(Australia) Wendy Turnbull; (United Kingdom) John Lloyd; 6–7^{(5–7)}, 7–6^{(7–5)}, 7–5	(United States) Billie Jean King (United States) Steve Denton	(South Africa) Yvonne Vermaak (United States) Billie Jean King	(South Africa) Jennifer Mundel-Reinbold (United Kingdom) Virginia Wade (United States) Barbara Potter (United States) Kathy Jordan

=== July ===
Week	Tournament	Champions	Runners-up	Semifinalists	Quarterfinalists
4 Jul	Fila European Cup Hittfeld; Hamburg, West Germany; Category 2 Clay – $100,000 – 32S/16D	(Hungary) Andrea Temesvári; 6–4, 6–2	(West Germany) Eva Pfaff	(Austria) Petra Huber (Argentina) Ivanna Madruga-Osses	(United States) Beth Herr (Peru) Laura Arraya (Switzerland) Petra Jauch-Delhees (West Germany) Claudia Kohde-Kilsch
4 Jul	Fila European Cup Hittfeld; Hamburg, West Germany; Category 2 Clay – $100,000 – 32S/16D	(West Germany) Bettina Bunge (West Germany) Claudia Kohde-Kilsch; 7–5, 6–4	(Argentina) Ivanna Madruga-Osses (United States) Catherine Tanvier	(Austria) Petra Huber (Argentina) Ivanna Madruga-Osses	(United States) Beth Herr (Peru) Laura Arraya (Switzerland) Petra Jauch-Delhees (West Germany) Claudia Kohde-Kilsch
11 Jul	Virginia Slims Hall of Fame Classic; Newport, United States; Category 2 Grass – $100,000 – 32S/16D/16Q; Singles – Doubles	(United States) Alycia Moulton; 6–3, 6–2	(United States) Kim Shaefer	(United States) Pam Shriver (United States) Terry Holladay	(United States) Louise Allen (United States) Sherry Acker (United States) Tina Mochizuki (United States) Anna-Maria Fernandez
11 Jul	Virginia Slims Hall of Fame Classic; Newport, United States; Category 2 Grass – $100,000 – 32S/16D/16Q; Singles – Doubles	(United States) Barbara Potter (United States) Pam Shriver; 6–3, 6–1	(United States) Barbara Jordan (Australia) Elizabeth Sayers	(United States) Pam Shriver (United States) Terry Holladay	(United States) Louise Allen (United States) Sherry Acker (United States) Tina Mochizuki (United States) Anna-Maria Fernandez
18 Jul	Federation Cup; Zürich, Switzerland; Team event Clay	Czechoslovakia; 2–1	West Germany	United States; Switzerland	Yugoslavia; Argentina; Australia; Great Britain

=== August ===
Week	Tournament	Champions	Runners-up	Semifinalists	Quarterfinalists
1 Aug	U.S. Clay Court Championships; Indianapolis, United States; Category 4 Clay – $200,000 – 56S/32D; Singles – Doubles	(Hungary) Andrea Temesvári; 6–2, 6–2	(United States) Zina Garrison	(Romania) Virginia Ruzici (United States) Kathy Rinaldi	(United States) Kathleen Horvath (United States) Bonnie Gadusek: (Argentina) Ivanna Madruga-Osses; (Bulgaria) Manuela Maleeva
1 Aug	U.S. Clay Court Championships; Indianapolis, United States; Category 4 Clay – $200,000 – 56S/32D; Singles – Doubles	(United States) Kathleen Horvath (Romania) Virginia Ruzici; 7–5, 6–4	(United States) Gigi Fernández; (United States) Beth Herr	(Romania) Virginia Ruzici (United States) Kathy Rinaldi	(United States) Kathleen Horvath (United States) Bonnie Gadusek: (Argentina) Ivanna Madruga-Osses; (Bulgaria) Manuela Maleeva
8 Aug	Virginia Slims of Los Angeles; Manhattan Beach, United States; Category 3 Hard – $150,000 – 56S/32D; Singles – Doubles	(United States) Martina Navratilova; 6–1, 6–3	(United States) Chris Evert-Lloyd	(United States) Pam Shriver (United States) Kate Latham	(United States) Wendy White (United States) Alycia Moulton: (United States) Elise Burgin; (United Kingdom) Jo Durie
8 Aug	Virginia Slims of Los Angeles; Manhattan Beach, United States; Category 3 Hard – $150,000 – 56S/32D; Singles – Doubles	(United States) Martina Navratilova (United States) Pam Shriver; 6–1, 6–0	(United States) Betsy Nagelsen; (Romania) Virginia Ruzici	(United States) Pam Shriver (United States) Kate Latham	(United States) Wendy White (United States) Alycia Moulton: (United States) Elise Burgin; (United Kingdom) Jo Durie
15 Aug	Player's Canadian Open; Toronto, Canada; Category 4 Hard – $200,000 – 56S/32D/32Q; Singles – Doubles	(United States) Martina Navratilova; 6–4, 4–6, 6–1	(United States) Chris Evert-Lloyd	(Czechoslovakia) Hana Mandlíková (United States) Elise Burgin	(United States) Kathleen Horvath (United States) Andrea Jaeger: (United States) Kathy Jordan; (West Germany) Claudia Kohde-Kilsch
15 Aug	Player's Canadian Open; Toronto, Canada; Category 4 Hard – $200,000 – 56S/32D/32Q; Singles – Doubles	(United Kingdom) Anne Hobbs (United States) Andrea Jaeger; 6–4, 5–7, 7–5	(South Africa) Rosalyn Fairbank; (United States) Candy Reynolds	(Czechoslovakia) Hana Mandlíková (United States) Elise Burgin	(United States) Kathleen Horvath (United States) Andrea Jaeger: (United States) Kathy Jordan; (West Germany) Claudia Kohde-Kilsch
22 Aug	Virginia Slims of New Jersey; Mahwah, United States; Category 2 Hard – $125,000 – 56S/32D	(United Kingdom) Jo Durie; 2–6, 7–5, 6–4	(Czechoslovakia) Hana Mandlíková	(United States) Barbara Potter (United States) Camille Benjamin	(Czechoslovakia) Helena Suková (Czechoslovakia) Iva Budařová: (South Africa) Rosalyn Fairbank; (Romania) Virginia Ruzici
22 Aug	Virginia Slims of New Jersey; Mahwah, United States; Category 2 Hard – $125,000 – 56S/32D	(United Kingdom) Jo Durie (United States) Sharon Walsh; 4–6, 7–5, 6–3	(South Africa) Rosalyn Fairbank; (United States) Candy Reynolds	(United States) Barbara Potter (United States) Camille Benjamin	(Czechoslovakia) Helena Suková (Czechoslovakia) Iva Budařová: (South Africa) Rosalyn Fairbank; (Romania) Virginia Ruzici
29 Aug	US Open; New York City, United States; Grand Slam; Hard – $800,000 – 128S/64Q/64D/32X; Singles – Doubles – Mixed doubles	(United States) Martina Navratilova; 6–1, 6–3	(United States) Chris Evert-Lloyd	(United States) Pam Shriver (United Kingdom) Jo Durie	(West Germany) Sylvia Hanika (United States) Andrea Jaeger (Argentina) Ivanna Madruga-Osses (Czechoslovakia) Hana Mandlíková
29 Aug	US Open; New York City, United States; Grand Slam; Hard – $800,000 – 128S/64Q/64D/32X; Singles – Doubles – Mixed doubles	(United States) Martina Navratilova (United States) Pam Shriver; 6–7, 6–1, 6–3	(South Africa) Rosalyn Fairbank (United States) Candy Reynolds	(United States) Pam Shriver (United Kingdom) Jo Durie	(West Germany) Sylvia Hanika (United States) Andrea Jaeger (Argentina) Ivanna Madruga-Osses (Czechoslovakia) Hana Mandlíková
29 Aug	US Open; New York City, United States; Grand Slam; Hard – $800,000 – 128S/64Q/64D/32X; Singles – Doubles – Mixed doubles	(Australia) Elizabeth Sayers (Australia) John Fitzgerald; 3–6, 6–3, 6–4	(United States) Barbara Potter (United States) Ferdi Taygan	(United States) Pam Shriver (United Kingdom) Jo Durie	(West Germany) Sylvia Hanika (United States) Andrea Jaeger (Argentina) Ivanna Madruga-Osses (Czechoslovakia) Hana Mandlíková

=== September ===
Week	Tournament	Champions	Runners-up	Semifinalists	Quarterfinalists
12 Sep	Queen's Grand Prix; Tokyo, Japan; Category 3 Carpet (i) – $175,000 – 28S	(United States) Lisa Bonder; 6–2, 5–7, 6–1	(United States) Andrea Jaeger	(United States) Kathleen Horvath (United States) Alycia Moulton	(United States) Beth Herr (United Kingdom) Anne Hobbs (United States) Leigh-Anne Thompson (United States) Vicki Nelson Dunbar
12 Sep	Virginia Slims of Utah; Salt Lake City, United States; Ginny Circuit – Category 1+ Hard – $50,000 – 32S/16D	(South Africa) Yvonne Vermaak; 6–2, 0–6, 7–5	(United States) Felicia Raschiatore	(United States) Paula Smith (Canada) Lilian Drescher	(United Kingdom) Sara Gomer (United States) Kate Latham (Australia) Elizabeth Minter (Brazil) Cláudia Monteiro
12 Sep	Virginia Slims of Utah; Salt Lake City, United States; Ginny Circuit – Category 1+ Hard – $50,000 – 32S/16D	(Brazil) Cláudia Monteiro; (South Africa) Yvonne Vermaak; 6–1, 3–6, 6–4	(United Kingdom) Amanda Brown; (Australia) Brenda Remilton		(United Kingdom) Sara Gomer (United States) Kate Latham (Australia) Elizabeth Minter (Brazil) Cláudia Monteiro
19 Sep	Central Fidelity Banks International; Richmond, United States; Category 3 Carpet (i) – $150,000 – 32S/16D	(South Africa) Rosalyn Fairbank; 6–4, 5–7, 6–4	(United States) Kathy Jordan	(United States) Barbara Potter (United States) Wendy White	(United States) Mary Lou Piatek (United States) Kim Sands (United States) Bobbie Gadusek (United States) Camille Benjamin
19 Sep	Central Fidelity Banks International; Richmond, United States; Category 3 Carpet (i) – $150,000 – 32S/16D	(South Africa) Rosalyn Fairbank; (United States) Candy Reynolds; 6–7^{(3–7)}, 6–2, 6–1	(United States) Kathy Jordan; (United States) Barbara Potter	(United States) Barbara Potter (United States) Wendy White	(United States) Mary Lou Piatek (United States) Kim Sands (United States) Bobbie Gadusek (United States) Camille Benjamin
19 Sep	Virginia Slims of Kansas; Kansas City, U.S. Ginny Circuit – Category 1+ Hard – $50,000 – 32S/16D	(Australia) Elizabeth Sayers; 6–3, 6–1	(Australia) Anne Minter	(United Kingdom) Sue Barker (United States) Barbara Gerken	(United States) Molly Van Nostrand (United States) Maeve Quinlan (United States) Lori McNeil (Australia) Chris O'Neil
19 Sep	Virginia Slims of Kansas; Kansas City, U.S. Ginny Circuit – Category 1+ Hard – $50,000 – 32S/16D	(United States) Sandy Collins; (Australia) Elizabeth Sayers; 7–5, 7–6	(Australia) Chris O'Neil; (Australia) Brenda Remilton	(United Kingdom) Sue Barker (United States) Barbara Gerken	(United States) Molly Van Nostrand (United States) Maeve Quinlan (United States) Lori McNeil (Australia) Chris O'Neil
26 Sep	US Indoors; Hartford, United States; Category 3 Carpet (i) – $150,000 – 32S/16D; Singles – Doubles	(United States) Kim Shaefer; 6–4, 6–3	(West Germany) Sylvia Hanika	(Australia) Wendy Turnbull (United States) Pam Shriver	(Canada) Carling Bassett (South Africa) Rosalyn Fairbank (United States) Zina Garrison (United States) Leslie Allen
26 Sep	US Indoors; Hartford, United States; Category 3 Carpet (i) – $150,000 – 32S/16D; Singles – Doubles	(United States) Billie Jean King; (United States) Sharon Walsh; 3–6, 6–3, 6–4	(United States) Kathy Jordan; (United States) Barbara Potter	(Australia) Wendy Turnbull (United States) Pam Shriver	(Canada) Carling Bassett (South Africa) Rosalyn Fairbank (United States) Zina Garrison (United States) Leslie Allen
26 Sep	Bakersfield Open; Bakersfield, United States; Ginny Circuit – Category 1+ Hard – $50,000 – 32S/16D	(South Africa) Jennifer Mundel-Reinbold; 6–4, 6–1	(United States) Julie Harrington	(United States) Lori McNeil (Peru) Pilar Vásquez	(United States) Lea Antonoplis (United States) Ann Henricksson (United States) Debbie Spence (Sweden) Lena Sandin
26 Sep	Bakersfield Open; Bakersfield, United States; Ginny Circuit – Category 1+ Hard – $50,000 – 32S/16D	(United States) Kyle Copeland; (United States) Lori McNeil; 6–4, 6–3	(United States) Ann Henricksson; (Brazil) Pat Medrado	(United States) Lori McNeil (Peru) Pilar Vásquez	(United States) Lea Antonoplis (United States) Ann Henricksson (United States) Debbie Spence (Sweden) Lena Sandin

=== October ===
Week	Tournament	Champions	Runners-up	Semifinalists	Quarterfinalists
3 Octr	Virginia Slims of Detroit; Detroit, United States; Category 3 Carpet (i) – $150,000 – 32S/16D	(Romania) Virginia Ruzici; 4–6, 6–4, 6–2	(United States) Kathy Jordan	(United States) Sharon Walsh (United States) Zina Garrison	(United States) Barbara Potter (Australia) Wendy Turnbull (Czechoslovakia) Hana Mandlíková (West Germany) Sylvia Hanika
3 Octr	Virginia Slims of Detroit; Detroit, United States; Category 3 Carpet (i) – $150,000 – 32S/16D	(United States) Kathy Jordan; (United States) Barbara Potter; 6–4, 6–1	(United States) Rosie Casals; (Australia) Wendy Turnbull	(United States) Sharon Walsh (United States) Zina Garrison	(United States) Barbara Potter (Australia) Wendy Turnbull (Czechoslovakia) Hana Mandlíková (West Germany) Sylvia Hanika
10 Oct	Borden Classic; Tokyo, Japan; Category 1 Hard – $75,000 – 32S/16D; Singles – Doubles	(United States) Lisa Bonder; 6–1, 6–3	(Peru) Laura Arraya	(Japan) Etsuko Inoue (United States) Micki Schillig	(United States) Shelley Solomon (Japan) Kumiko Okamoto (Japan) Masako Yanagi (United States) Tina Mochizuki
10 Oct	Borden Classic; Tokyo, Japan; Category 1 Hard – $75,000 – 32S/16D; Singles – Doubles	(Australia) Chris O'Neil; (Australia) Pam Whytcross; 5–7, 7–6, 6–3	(Australia) Brenda Remilton; (Japan) Naoko Satō	(Japan) Etsuko Inoue (United States) Micki Schillig	(United States) Shelley Solomon (Japan) Kumiko Okamoto (Japan) Masako Yanagi (United States) Tina Mochizuki
10 Oct	Florida Federal Open; Tampa, United States; Category 3 Hard – $150,000 – 32S/16D; Singles – Doubles	(United States) Martina Navratilova; 6–3, 6–2	(United States) Pam Shriver	(United States) Zina Garrison (United States) Kathy Rinaldi	(United States) Bonnie Gadusek (United States) Debbie Spence (United States) Elise Burgin (Italy) Raffaella Reggi
10 Oct	Florida Federal Open; Tampa, United States; Category 3 Hard – $150,000 – 32S/16D; Singles – Doubles	(United States) Martina Navratilova; (United States) Pam Shriver; 6–0, 6–1	(United States) Bonnie Gadusek; (United States) Wendy White	(United States) Zina Garrison (United States) Kathy Rinaldi	(United States) Bonnie Gadusek (United States) Debbie Spence (United States) Elise Burgin (Italy) Raffaella Reggi
17 Oct	Daihatsu Challenge; Brighton, Great Britain; Category 3 Carpet (i) – $150,000 – 32S/16D	(United States) Chris Evert-Lloyd; 6–1, 6–1	(United Kingdom) Jo Durie	(Hungary) Andrea Temesvári (United States) Pam Shriver	(France) Catherine Tanvier (France) Marie-Christine Calleja (United States) Ann Kiyomura (United Kingdom) Sue Barker
17 Oct	Daihatsu Challenge; Brighton, Great Britain; Category 3 Carpet (i) – $150,000 – 32S/16D	(United States) Chris Evert-Lloyd; (United States) Pam Shriver; 7–5, 6–4	(United Kingdom) Jo Durie; (United States) Ann Kiyomura	(Hungary) Andrea Temesvári (United States) Pam Shriver	(France) Catherine Tanvier (France) Marie-Christine Calleja (United States) Ann Kiyomura (United Kingdom) Sue Barker
17 Oct	Japan Open Tennis Championships; Tokyo, Japan; Category 1 Hard – $50,000 – S/D	(Japan) Etsuko Inoue; 7–5, 6–2	(United States) Shelley Solomon	(West Germany) Myriam Schropp (United States) Betsy Nagelsen	(Japan) Masako Yanagi (Japan) Emiko Okagawa (United States) Tina Mochizuki (United States) Kathy O'Brien
17 Oct	Japan Open Tennis Championships; Tokyo, Japan; Category 1 Hard – $50,000 – S/D	(Australia) Chris O'Neil; (Australia) Pam Whytcross; 6–3, 7–5	(United States) Helena Manset; (United States) Micki Schillig	(West Germany) Myriam Schropp (United States) Betsy Nagelsen	(Japan) Masako Yanagi (Japan) Emiko Okagawa (United States) Tina Mochizuki (United States) Kathy O'Brien
24 Oct	Porsche Classic; Stuttgart, West Germany; Category 3 Carpet (i) – $150,000 – 32S/16D	(United States) Martina Navratilova; 6–1, 6–2	(France) Catherine Tanvier	(West Germany) Eva Pfaff (Romania) Virginia Ruzici	(United Kingdom) Jo Durie (Hungary) Andrea Temesvári (Sweden) Catrin Jexell (Czechoslovakia) Helena Suková
24 Oct	Porsche Classic; Stuttgart, West Germany; Category 3 Carpet (i) – $150,000 – 32S/16D	(United States) Martina Navratilova; (United States) Candy Reynolds; 6–2, 6–1	(Romania) Virginia Ruzici; (France) Catherine Tanvier	(West Germany) Eva Pfaff (Romania) Virginia Ruzici	(United Kingdom) Jo Durie (Hungary) Andrea Temesvári (Sweden) Catrin Jexell (Czechoslovakia) Helena Suková

=== November ===
Week	Tournament	Champions	Runners-up	Semifinalists	Quarterfinalists
7 Nov	Lynda Carter Maybelline Classic; Deerfield Beach, United States; Category 2 Hard – $125,000 – 32S/16D	(United States) Chris Evert-Lloyd; 6–0, 6–4	(United States) Bonnie Gadusek	(United States) Anne Smith (United States) Pam Casale	(United States) Michelle Torres (United States) Kim Sands (United States) Beth Herr (United States) Kathy Rinaldi
7 Nov	Lynda Carter Maybelline Classic; Deerfield Beach, United States; Category 2 Hard – $125,000 – 32S/16D	(United States) Bonnie Gadusek; (United States) Wendy White; 6–1, 3–6, 6–3	(United States) Pam Casale; (United States) Mary Lou Piatek	(United States) Anne Smith (United States) Pam Casale	(United States) Michelle Torres (United States) Kim Sands (United States) Beth Herr (United States) Kathy Rinaldi
7 Nov	Ginny Championships; Honolulu, United States; Ginny Circuit – Category 1+ Carpet (i) – $150,000 – 15S/5D; Singles – Doubles	(United States) Kathleen Horvath; 4–6, 6–2, 7–6^{(7–1)}	(Canada) Carling Bassett	(South Africa) Yvonne Vermaak (United States) Sandy Collins	(United Kingdom) Anne Hobbs (United States) Julie Harrington (United States) Ginny Purdy (Australia) Elizabeth Sayers
7 Nov	Ginny Championships; Honolulu, United States; Ginny Circuit – Category 1+ Carpet (i) – $150,000 – 15S/5D; Singles – Doubles	(South Africa) Rosalyn Fairbank (United States) Candy Reynolds; 5–7, 7–5, 6–3	(United States) Lea Antonoplis; (United States) Barbara Jordan	(South Africa) Yvonne Vermaak (United States) Sandy Collins	(United Kingdom) Anne Hobbs (United States) Julie Harrington (United States) Ginny Purdy (Australia) Elizabeth Sayers
14 Nov	National Panasonic Open; Brisbane, Australia; Category 3 Grass – $150,000 – 56S/32D/32Q	(United States) Pam Shriver; 6–4, 7–5	(Australia) Wendy Turnbull	(United Kingdom) Jo Durie (Czechoslovakia) Hana Mandlíková	(West Germany) Claudia Kohde-Kilsch (France) Catherine Suire (West Germany) Eva Pfaff (South Africa) Rosalyn Fairbank
14 Nov	National Panasonic Open; Brisbane, Australia; Category 3 Grass – $150,000 – 56S/32D/32Q	(United Kingdom) Anne Hobbs; (Australia) Wendy Turnbull; 6–3, 6–4	(United States) Pam Shriver; (United States) Sharon Walsh	(United Kingdom) Jo Durie (Czechoslovakia) Hana Mandlíková	(West Germany) Claudia Kohde-Kilsch (France) Catherine Suire (West Germany) Eva Pfaff (South Africa) Rosalyn Fairbank
18 Nov	Lion's Cup; Tokyo, Japan; Category 2 Carpet – $200,000 – 4S; Singles	(United States) Martina Navratilova; 6–2, 6–2	(United States) Chris Evert-Lloyd	(Hungary) Andrea Temesvári (United States) Andrea Jaeger	
21 Nov	NSW Building Society Open; Sydney, Australia; Category 3 Grass – $150,000 – 56S/32D	(United Kingdom) Jo Durie; 6–3, 7–5	(United States) Kathy Jordan	(Australia) Elizabeth Sayers (Czechoslovakia) Helena Suková	(United States) Gigi Fernández (France) Sophie Amiach (South Africa) Rosalyn Fairbank (West Germany) Eva Pfaff
21 Nov	NSW Building Society Open; Sydney, Australia; Category 3 Grass – $150,000 – 56S/32D	(United Kingdom) Anne Hobbs; (Australia) Wendy Turnbull; 6–4, 6–3	(Czechoslovakia) Hana Mandlíková (Czechoslovakia) Helena Suková	(Australia) Elizabeth Sayers (Czechoslovakia) Helena Suková	(United States) Gigi Fernández (France) Sophie Amiach (South Africa) Rosalyn Fairbank (West Germany) Eva Pfaff
28 Nov	Marlboro Australian Open; Melbourne, Australia; Grand Slam; Grass – $500,000 – 64S/32Q/32D; Singles – Doubles	(United States) Martina Navratilova; 6–2, 7–6^{(7–5)}	(United States) Kathy Jordan	(United States) Pam Shriver (United States) Zina Garrison	(United Kingdom) Jo Durie (Canada) Carling Bassett (Australia) Wendy Turnbull (West Germany) Sylvia Hanika
28 Nov	Marlboro Australian Open; Melbourne, Australia; Grand Slam; Grass – $500,000 – 64S/32Q/32D; Singles – Doubles	(United States) Martina Navratilova; (United States) Pam Shriver; 6–4, 6–7^{(2–7)}, 6–2	(United Kingdom) Anne Hobbs (Australia) Wendy Turnbull	(United States) Pam Shriver (United States) Zina Garrison	(United Kingdom) Jo Durie (Canada) Carling Bassett (Australia) Wendy Turnbull (West Germany) Sylvia Hanika

=== January 1984 ===
Week	Tournament	Champions	Runners-up	Semifinalists	Quarterfinalists
2 Jan	Virginia Slims of Nashville; Nashville, United States; Ginny Circuit – Category 1+ Hard (i) – $50,000 – 32S/16D; Singles – Doubles	(United States) Jenny Klitch; 6–2, 6–1	(United States) Pam Teeguarden	(United States) Kathleen Cummings (Italy) Sandra Cecchini	(France) Nathalie Herreman (Romania) Lucia Romanov: (France) Marie-Christine Calleja; (United States) Trey Lewis
2 Jan	Virginia Slims of Nashville; Nashville, United States; Ginny Circuit – Category 1+ Hard (i) – $50,000 – 32S/16D; Singles – Doubles	(United States) Sherry Acker; (United States) Candy Reynolds; 5–7, 7–6, 7–6	(United States) Mary Lou Piatek; (United States) Paula Smith	(United States) Kathleen Cummings (Italy) Sandra Cecchini	(France) Nathalie Herreman (Romania) Lucia Romanov: (France) Marie-Christine Calleja; (United States) Trey Lewis
2 Jan	Virginia Slims of Washington; Washington, United States; Category 3 Carpet (i) – $150,000 – 32S/16D; Singles – Doubles	(Czechoslovakia) Hana Mandlíková; 6–1, 6–1	(United States) Zina Garrison	(United States) Pam Casale (Czechoslovakia) Helena Suková	(United States) Lisa Bonder (United States) Kathleen Horvath: (United States) Bonnie Gadusek; (United States) Barbara Potter
2 Jan	Virginia Slims of Washington; Washington, United States; Category 3 Carpet (i) – $150,000 – 32S/16D; Singles – Doubles	(United States) Barbara Potter; (United States) Sharon Walsh; 6–1, 6–7^{(7–9)}, 6–2	(United States) Leslie Allen; (United States) Anne White	(United States) Pam Casale (Czechoslovakia) Helena Suková	(United States) Lisa Bonder (United States) Kathleen Horvath: (United States) Bonnie Gadusek; (United States) Barbara Potter
9 Jan	Virginia Slims of California; Oakland, California, United States; Category 3 Carpet (i) – $150,000 – 32S/16D; Singles – Doubles	(Czechoslovakia) Hana Mandlíková; 7–6^{(8–6)}, 3–6, 6–4	(United States) Martina Navratilova	(Czechoslovakia) Helena Suková (United States) Pam Shriver	(United States) Zina Garrison (West Germany) Eva Pfaff: (West Germany) Bettina Bunge; (United States) Andrea Jaeger
9 Jan	Virginia Slims of California; Oakland, California, United States; Category 3 Carpet (i) – $150,000 – 32S/16D; Singles – Doubles	(United States) Martina Navratilova; (United States) Pam Shriver; 6–2, 6–3	(United States) Rosie Casals; (United States) Alycia Moulton	(Czechoslovakia) Helena Suková (United States) Pam Shriver	(United States) Zina Garrison (West Germany) Eva Pfaff: (West Germany) Bettina Bunge; (United States) Andrea Jaeger
9 Jan	Virginia Slims of Pennsylvania; Hershey, United States; Ginny Circuit – Category 1+ Carpet (i) – $50,000 – 32S/16D; Singles – Doubles	(Sweden) Catarina Lindqvist; 6–4, 6–0	(United States) Beth Herr	(United States) Camille Benjamin (United Kingdom) Amanda Brown	(United States) Kathrin Keil (Peru) Laura Arraya: (Australia) Anne Minter; (United States) Mary Lou Piatek
9 Jan	Virginia Slims of Pennsylvania; Hershey, United States; Ginny Circuit – Category 1+ Carpet (i) – $50,000 – 32S/16D; Singles – Doubles	(Czechoslovakia) Marcela Skuherská; (Czechoslovakia) Kateřina Böhmová; 6–1, 6–3	(United States) Ann Henricksson; (United States) Nancy Yeargin	(United States) Camille Benjamin (United Kingdom) Amanda Brown	(United States) Kathrin Keil (Peru) Laura Arraya: (Australia) Anne Minter; (United States) Mary Lou Piatek
16 Jan	Virginia Slims of Denver; Denver, United States; Ginny Circuit – Category 1+ Hard (i) – $50,000 – 32S/16D	(United States) Mary Lou Piatek; 6–1, 6–1	(United States) Kim Sands	(France) Sophie Amiach (Peru) Laura Arraya	(Soviet Union) Natasha Reva: (Peru) Vicki Nelson-Dunbar (United Kingdom) Amanda Brown; (Czechoslovakia) Marcela Skuherská
16 Jan	Virginia Slims of Denver; Denver, United States; Ginny Circuit – Category 1+ Hard (i) – $50,000 – 32S/16D	(Netherlands) Marcella Mesker; (United Kingdom) Anne Hobbs; 6–2, 6–3	(United States) Sherry Acker; (United States) Candy Reynolds	(France) Sophie Amiach (Peru) Laura Arraya	(Soviet Union) Natasha Reva: (Peru) Vicki Nelson-Dunbar (United Kingdom) Amanda Brown; (Czechoslovakia) Marcela Skuherská
23 Jan	Avon Cup; Marco Island, United States; Category 2 Clay – $100,000 – 32S/16D; Singles – Doubles	(United States) Bonnie Gadusek; 3–6, 6–0, 6–4	(United States) Kathleen Horvath	(United States) Camille Benjamin (Romania) Virginia Ruzici	(United States) Zina Garrison (Argentina) Ivanna Madruga-Osses: (United States) Pam Casale; (Peru) Laura Arraya
23 Jan	Avon Cup; Marco Island, United States; Category 2 Clay – $100,000 – 32S/16D; Singles – Doubles	(Czechoslovakia) Hana Mandlíková; (Czechoslovakia) Helena Suková; 6–2, 6–3	(United Kingdom) Anne Hobbs; (United States) Andrea Jaeger	(United States) Camille Benjamin (Romania) Virginia Ruzici	(United States) Zina Garrison (Argentina) Ivanna Madruga-Osses: (United States) Pam Casale; (Peru) Laura Arraya
23 Jan	Pittsburgh Open; Pittsburgh, United States; Ginny Circuit – Category 1+ Carpet (i) – $50,000 – 32S/16D; Singles – Doubles	(United States) Andrea Leand; 0–6, 6–2, 6–4	(France) Pascale Paradis	(South Africa) Rosalyn Fairbank (United States) Peanut Louie	(France) Catherine Suire (Netherlands) Marcella Mesker: (United States) Lea Antonoplis; (Japan) Etsuko Inoue
23 Jan	Pittsburgh Open; Pittsburgh, United States; Ginny Circuit – Category 1+ Carpet (i) – $50,000 – 32S/16D; Singles – Doubles	(Switzerland) Christiane Jolissaint; (Netherlands) Marcella Mesker; 6–2, 6–3	(United States) Anna-Maria Fernandez; (United States) Trey Lewis	(South Africa) Rosalyn Fairbank (United States) Peanut Louie	(France) Catherine Suire (Netherlands) Marcella Mesker: (United States) Lea Antonoplis; (Japan) Etsuko Inoue
30 Jan	Virginia Slims of Houston; Houston, United States; Category 2 Carpet (i) – $150,000 – 32S/16D	(Czechoslovakia) Hana Mandlíková; 6–4, 6–2	(Bulgaria) Manuela Maleeva	(Australia) Wendy Turnbull (United States) Barbara Potter	(United States) Andrea Jaeger (United States) Zina Garrison: (Canada) Carling Bassett; (West Germany) Eva Pfaff
30 Jan	Virginia Slims of Houston; Houston, United States; Category 2 Carpet (i) – $150,000 – 32S/16D	(Socialist Federal Republic of Yugoslavia) Mima Jaušovec; (United States) Anne White; 6–4, 3–6, 7–6^{(7–4)}	(United States) Barbara Potter; (United States) Sharon Walsh	(Australia) Wendy Turnbull (United States) Barbara Potter	(United States) Andrea Jaeger (United States) Zina Garrison: (Canada) Carling Bassett; (West Germany) Eva Pfaff
30 Jan	Virginia Slims of Indianapolis; Indianapolis, United States; Ginny Circuit – Category 1+ Carpet (i) – $50,000 – 32S/16D	(United States) JoAnne Russell; 7–6, 6–2	(France) Pascale Paradis	(Brazil) Pat Medrado (United States) Terry Holladay	(France) Corrinne Vanier (South Africa) Beverly Mould (Italy) Sandra Cecchini (United States) Nancy Yeargin
30 Jan	Virginia Slims of Indianapolis; Indianapolis, United States; Ginny Circuit – Category 1+ Carpet (i) – $50,000 – 32S/16D	(Brazil) Cláudia Monteiro; (South Africa) Yvonne Vermaak; 6–4, 6–7, 7–5	(South Africa) Beverly Mould; (Australia) Elizabeth Sayers	(Brazil) Pat Medrado (United States) Terry Holladay	(France) Corrinne Vanier (South Africa) Beverly Mould (Italy) Sandra Cecchini (United States) Nancy Yeargin

=== February 1984 ===
Week	Tournament	Champions	Runners-up	Semifinalists	Quarterfinalists
6 Feb	Virginia Slims of Chicago; Chicago, United States; Category 2 Carpet (i) – $150,000 – 32S/16D	(United States) Pam Shriver; 7–6^{(7–4)}, 2–6, 6–3	(United States) Barbara Potter	(Australia) Wendy Turnbull (Czechoslovakia) Helena Suková	(United States) Bonnie Gadusek (Canada) Carling Bassett: (United States) Kathy Rinaldi; (Netherlands) Marcella Mesker
6 Feb	Virginia Slims of Chicago; Chicago, United States; Category 2 Carpet (i) – $150,000 – 32S/16D	(United States) Billie Jean King; (United States) Sharon Walsh; 5–7, 6–3, 6–3	(United States) Barbara Potter; (United States) Pam Shriver	(Australia) Wendy Turnbull (Czechoslovakia) Helena Suková	(United States) Bonnie Gadusek (Canada) Carling Bassett: (United States) Kathy Rinaldi; (Netherlands) Marcella Mesker
20 Feb	US Indoors; Livingston, New Jersey, United States; Category 2 Carpet (i) – $150,000 – 32S/16D; Singles – Doubles	(United States) Martina Navratilova; 6–2, 7–6^{(7–4)}	(United States) Chris Evert-Lloyd	(Netherlands) Marcella Mesker (Bulgaria) Manuela Maleeva	(United States) Pam Casale (United Kingdom) Jo Durie: (United States) Bonnie Gadusek; (West Germany) Sylvia Hanika
20 Feb	US Indoors; Livingston, New Jersey, United States; Category 2 Carpet (i) – $150,000 – 32S/16D; Singles – Doubles	(United States) Martina Navratilova; (United States) Pam Shriver; 6–4, 6–3	(United Kingdom) Jo Durie; (United States) Ann Kiyomura	(Netherlands) Marcella Mesker (Bulgaria) Manuela Maleeva	(United States) Pam Casale (United Kingdom) Jo Durie: (United States) Bonnie Gadusek; (West Germany) Sylvia Hanika
27 Feb	Virginia Slims Championships; New York City, United States; Carpet (i) – $500,000 – 16S/8D; Singles – Doubles	(United States) Martina Navratilova; 6–3, 7–5, 6–1	(United States) Chris Evert-Lloyd	(United States) Pam Shriver (United States) Barbara Potter	(Canada) Carling Bassett (Czechoslovakia) Hana Mandlíková: (United States) Kathleen Horvath; (Czechoslovakia) Helena Suková
27 Feb	Virginia Slims Championships; New York City, United States; Carpet (i) – $500,000 – 16S/8D; Singles – Doubles	(United States) Martina Navratilova; (United States) Pam Shriver; 6–3, 6–1	(United Kingdom) Jo Durie; (United States) Ann Kiyomura	(United States) Pam Shriver (United States) Barbara Potter	(Canada) Carling Bassett (Czechoslovakia) Hana Mandlíková: (United States) Kathleen Horvath; (Czechoslovakia) Helena Suková

== Rankings ==
=== Singles ===
Below are the 1983 WTA year-end rankings (December 5, 1983) in singles competition:

WTA Singles year-end ranking
No	Player Name	Points	1982	Change
1	Martina Navratilova (USA)	19.606	1	=
2	Chris Evert-Lloyd (USA)	17.768	2	=
3	Andrea Jaeger (USA)	11.558	3	=
4	Tracy Austin (USA)	10.233	4	=
5	Pam Shriver (USA)	10.094	6	+1
6	Sylvia Hanika (FRG)	10.088	10	+4
7	Wendy Turnbull (AUS)	9.459	5	-2
8	Jo Durie (GBR)	9.287	28	+20
9	Hana Mandlíková (TCH)	8.965	7	-2
10	Andrea Temesvári (HUN)	8.907	33	+23
11	Bettina Bunge (FRG)	8.858	9	-2
12	Zina Garrison (USA)	8.576	16	NR
13	Kathy Jordan (USA)	7.153	21	+8
14	Kathy Rinaldi (USA)	6.711	15	+1
15	Kathleen Horvath (USA)	6.511	49	+34
16	Helena Suková (TCH)	6.393	25	+9
17	Ivanna Madruga (ARG)	6.146	34	+17
18	Bonnie Gadusek (USA)	6.137	18	=
19	Virginia Ruzici (ROU)	6.123	11	-8
20	Carling Bassett (CAN)	5.110	NR	NR

Virginia Slims Singles year-end ranking
No	Player Name	Points
1	Martina Navratilova (USA)	4,610
2	Chris Evert-Lloyd (USA)	2,574
3	Hana Mandlíková (TCH)	2,310
4	Pam Shriver (USA)	2,130
5	Andrea Jaeger (USA)	1,910
6	Wendy Turnbull (AUS)	1,850
7	Jo Durie (GBR)	1,800
8	Sylvia Hanika (FRG)	1,795
9	Zina Garrison (USA)	1,635
10	Kathy Jordan (USA)	1,534
11	Barbara Potter (USA)	1,510
12	Andrea Temesvári (HUN)	1,455
13	Carling Bassett (CAN)	1,439
14	Helena Suková (TCH)	1,409
15	Kathleen Horvath (USA)	1,398
16	Virginia Ruzici (ROU)	1,340
17	Eva Pfaff (FRG)	1,190
18	Yvonne Vermaak (RSA)	1,150
19	Bonnie Gadusek (USA)	1,145
20	Kathy Rinaldi (USA)	1,145

== Points distribution ==
Virginia Slims ranking points distribution.

Category		W	F	SF	QF	R16	R32	R64	R128
Grand Slam	Singles	400	250	200	150	100	50	25	15
Grand Slam	Doubles	150	120	90	75	50	32	15	–
VS Championships	Singles	400	250	200	150	100	–	–	–
Category 4	Singles	250	150	130	100	65	30	15	10
Category 4	Doubles	115	90	70	50	35	22	8	–
Category 3	Singles	200	110	90	60	35	20	10	5
Category 3	Doubles	80	60	45	30	17	8	–	
Category 2	Singles	100	70	50	25	15	9	5	2
Category 2	Doubles	60	40	30	20	10	4	–	–
Category 1+	Singles	85	65	45	23	13	5	–	–
Category 1+	Doubles	45	35	25	16	8	–	–	–
Category 1	Singles	75	50	30	15	8	–	–	–
Category 1	Doubles	38	28	17	8	4	–	–	–

== Statistical information ==
=== Titles won by player ===
These tables present the number of singles (S), doubles (D), and mixed doubles (X) titles won by each player and each nation during the season, within all the tournament categories of the 1983 Virginia Slims World Championship Series: the Grand Slam tournaments, the Year-end championships and regular events. The players/nations are sorted by:

1. total number of titles (a doubles title won by two players representing the same nation counts as only one win for the nation);
2. highest amount of highest category tournaments (for example, having a single Grand Slam gives preference over any kind of combination without a Grand Slam title);
3. a singles > doubles > mixed doubles hierarchy;
4. alphabetical order (by family names for players).

Total titles	Player	Grand Slam tournaments			Year-end championships		Regular tournaments		All titles		
Total titles	Player	Singles	Doubles	Mixed	Singles	Doubles	Singles	Doubles	Singles	Doubles	Mixed
29	(United States) Martina Navratilova	3	3		1	1	12	9	16	13	
15	(United States) Pam Shriver		3			1	2	9	2	13	
8	(United States) Candy Reynolds		1					7		8	
7	(United States) Chris Evert-Lloyd	1					5	1	6	1	
7	(United States) Sharon Walsh							7		7	
6	(South Africa) Rosalyn Fairbank		1				1	4	1	5	
5	(United States) Billie Jean King						1	4	1	4	
5	(United Kingdom) Jo Durie						2	3	2	4	
5	(United Kingdom) Anne Hobbs						1	4	1	4	
4	(Australia) Elizabeth Sayers			1			1	2	1	2	1
4	(South Africa) Yvonne Vermaak						2	2	2	2	
4	(Australia) Wendy Turnbull			1			1	2	1	2	1
3	(United States) Barbara Jordan			1				2		2	1
3	(Hungary) Andrea Temesvári						3		3		
3	(United States) Kathleen Horvath						2	1	2	1	
3	(United States) Alycia Moulton						2	1	2	1	
3	(West Germany) Bettina Bunge						1	2	1	2	
3	(United States) Andrea Jaeger						1	2	1	2	
3	(Romania) Virginia Ruzici						1	2	1	2	
3	(Australia) Pam Whytcross							3		3	
2	(United States) Lisa Bonder						2		2		
2	(United States) Lea Antonoplis							2		2	
2	(United States) Kathy Jordan							2		2	
2	(United States) Ann Kiyomura							2		2	
2	(West Germany) Claudia Kohde-Kilsch							2		2	
2	(Australia) Chris O'Neil							2		2	
2	(West Germany) Eva Pfaff							2		2	
2	(United States) Barbara Potter							2		2	
1	(Japan) Etsuko Inoue						1		1		
1	(South Africa) Beverly Mould						1		1		
1	(South Africa) Jennifer Mundel-Reinbold						1		1		
1	(France) Pascale Paradis						1		1		
1	(United States) Ginny Purdy						1		1		
1	(United States) Kim Shaefer						1		1		
1	(France) Catherine Tanvier						1		1		
1	(Canada) Carling Bassett						1		1		
1	(United States) Sandy Collins							1		1	
1	(United States) Kyle Copeland							1		1	
1	(United States) Mary Lou Piatek							1		1	
1	(United States) Bonnie Gadusek							1		1	
1	(Switzerland) Christiane Jolissaint							1		1	
1	(United States) Lori McNeil							1		1	
1	(Netherlands) Marcella Mesker							1		1	
1	(Brazil) Cláudia Monteiro							1		1	
1	(New Zealand) Chris Newton							1		1	
1	(United States) Anne Smith							1		1	
1	(United States) Paula Smith							1		1	
1	(United Kingdom) Virginia Wade							1		1	
1	(United States) Wendy White							1		1	

=== Titles won by nation ===
Total titles	Country	Grand Slam tournaments			Year-end championships		Regular tournaments		All titles		
Total titles	Country	Singles	Doubles	Mixed	Singles	Doubles	Singles	Doubles	Singles	Doubles	Mixed
74	United States	4	4	1	1	1	29	34	34	39	1
12	South Africa		1				5	6	5	7	
11	Australia			2			2	7	2	7	2
10	United Kingdom						3	7	3	7	
4	(West Germany) Germany						1	3	1	3	
3	Hungary						3		3		
3	Romania						1	2	1	2	
2	France						2		2		
1	Brazil							1		1	
1	Canada						1		1		
1	Japan						1		1		
1	New Zealand							1		1	
1	Netherlands							1		1	
1	Switzerland							1		1	

The following players won their first title in singles (S), doubles (D) or mixed doubles (X):

- (United States) Lori McNeil – Bakersfield (D)
- (United States) Bonnie Gadusek – Deerfield Beach (D)
- (United States) Sandy Collins – Kansas (D)
- (United States) Kyle Copeland – Bakersfield (D)
- (New Zealand) Chris O'Neil – Kitzbühel (D)
- (Switzerland) Christiane Jolissaint – Lugano (D)
- (France) Catherine Tanvier – Filderstadt (S)
- (France) Pascale Paradis – Kitzbühel (S)
- (United States) Kim Shaefer – Hartford (S)
- (United States) Ginny Purdy – Pittsburgh (S)
- Etsuko Inoue – Japan Open (S)
- (South Africa) Jennifer Mundel-Reinbold – Bakersfield (S)
- (South Africa) Rosalyn Fairbank – Richmond (S)
- (United Kingdom) Jo Durie – Mahwah (S)
- (United Kingdom) Anne Hobbs – Indianapolis (S)
- (Australia) Elizabeth Sayers – Ridgewood (D), US Open (X)
- (South Africa) Yvonne Vermaak – Palm Springs (S)
- (United States) Barbara Jordan – French Open (X)
- (Hungary) Andrea Temesvári – Perugia (S)
- (United States) Kathleen Horvath – Nashville (S)
- (United States) Alycia Moulton – Ridgewood (S)
- (West Germany) Bettina Bunge – Hamburg (D)
- (Australia) Pam Whytcross – Kitzbühel (D)
- (Australia) Chris O'Neil – Borden Classic (D)

The following players mounted a successful title defence in singles (S), doubles (D) or mixed doubles (X):

- (United States) Martina Navratilova – Washington (S), Chicago (S,D), Dallas (S,D), New York Masters (D), Hilton Head (S,D), Orlando (S), Eastbourne (S,D), Wimbledon (S, D), Montreal (S), Stuttgart (S, D), Australian Open (D)
- (United States) Chris Evert-Lloyd – Palm Beach (S), Amelia Island (S), Deerfield Beach (S)
- (United States) Billie Jean King (S)
- (United States) Lisa Bonder – Borden Classic (S)
- (United States) Pam Shriver – Houston (D), Chicago (D), Dallas (D), New York Masters (D), Eastbourne (D), Wimbledon (D), Brighton (D), Australian Open (D)
- (United States) Sharon Walsh – New Jersey (D)
- (United States) Candy Reynolds – Richmond (D)

== Retirements ==
The following are notable players who announced their retirement from women's tennis in 1983.

- (United States) Anne Smith
- (United States) Billie Jean King
- (Australia) Evonne Goolagong
- (South Africa) Tanya Harford

== See also ==
- 1983 Volvo Grand Prix – men's circuit
- Women's Tennis Association
- International Tennis Federation

== Notes ==
- ^{A} The tournament was halted by rain delays on 23 occasions over the first five days. The tournament was eventually cancelled after players rejected the officials attempts to move the tournament indoors.
- Martina Navratilova only lost one match during the whole year, against Kathleen Horvath in the fourth round of the French Open.
