= 1984 Pittsburgh Open – Doubles =

Doubles
- 1984 Pittsburgh Open

Final
- Champions: (Switzerland) Christiane Jolissaint (Netherlands) Marcella Mesker
- Runners-up: (United States) Anna-Maria Fernandez (United States) Trey Lewis
- Score: 7–6, 6–4

Details
- Draw: 16 (2Q)
- Seeds: 4

Events
Singles	Doubles
← 1983 ·	Pittsburgh Open

Candy Reynolds and Paula Smith were the defending champions, but Smith did not compete this year. Reynolds teamed up with Rosalyn Fairbank and lost in the first round to Peanut Louie Harper and Heather Ludloff.

Christiane Jolissaint and Marcella Mesker won the title by defeating Anna-Maria Fernandez and Trey Lewis 7–6, 6–4 in the final.

== Seeds ==
1. (South Africa) Rosalyn Fairbank / (United States) Candy Reynolds (first round)
2. (United States) Lea Antonoplis / (United States) Barbara Jordan (quarterfinals)
3. (Brazil) Cláudia Monteiro / (South Africa) Yvonne Vermaak (semifinals)
4. (South Africa) Beverly Mould / (Australia) Elizabeth Smylie (first round)

== Draw ==
=== Key ===
- Q = Qualifier
- WC = Wild card
- LL = Lucky loser
- Alt = Alternate
- SE = Special exempt
- PR = Protected ranking
- ITF = ITF entry
- JE = Junior exempt
- w/o = Walkover
- r = Retired
- d = Defaulted
- SR = Special ranking

=== Draw ===
First round
1	(South Africa) R Fairbank (United States) C Reynolds	5	6	3
(United States) P Louie Harper (United States) H Ludloff	7	4	6
(Switzerland) C Jolissaint (Netherlands) M Mesker	6	6
(Czechoslovakia) K Skronská (Czechoslovakia) M Skuherská	4	3
4	(South Africa) B Mould (Australia) E Smylie	3	3
Q	(Soviet Union) S Cherneva (Soviet Union) N Reva	6	6
(France) P Paradis (France) C Suire	3	6
(United States) A Henricksson (United States) N Yeargin	6	7
(United States) G Fernández (Brazil) P Medrado	6	5	6
Q	(Switzerland) L Drescher (France) N Herreman	4	7	3
(Sweden) C Jexell (South Africa) J Mundel	1	0
3	(Brazil) C Monteiro (South Africa) Y Vermaak	6	6
(United States) K Latham (United States) K Steinmetz	6	1	5
(United States) AM Fernandez (United States) T Lewis	4	6	7
(United States) S Scker (United States) Janet Wright	2	1
2	(United States) L Antonoplis (United States) B Jordan	6	6

Quarterfinals
(United States) P Louie Harper (United States) H Ludloff	6	3	4
(Switzerland) C Jolissaint (Netherlands) M Mesker	3	6	6
Q	(Soviet Union) S Cherneva (Soviet Union) N Reva	6	6
(United States) A Henricksson (United States) N Yeargin	3	3
(United States) G Fernández (Brazil) P Medrado	2	2
3	(Brazil) C Monteiro (South Africa) Y Vermaak	6	6
(United States) AM Fernandez (United States) T Lewis	6	4	6
2	(United States) L Antonoplis (United States) B Jordan	4	6	1

Semifinals
(Switzerland) C Jolissaint (Netherlands) M Mesker	6	7
Q	(Soviet Union) S Cherneva (Soviet Union) N Reva	4	6
3	(Brazil) C Monteiro (South Africa) Y Vermaak	6	3	2
(United States) AM Fernandez (United States) T Lewis	2	6	6

Final
(Switzerland) C Jolissaint (Netherlands) M Mesker	7	6
(United States) AM Fernandez (United States) T Lewis	6	4
