= 1984 Pittsburgh Open =

- Date: January 23–29
- Edition: 3rd
- Category: Ginny Circuit
- Draw: 32S / 16D
- Prize money: $50,000
- Surface: Carpet / indoor
- Location: Pittsburgh, Pennsylvania, U.S.
- Venue: Greentree Racquet Club

Champions

Singles
- (United States) Andrea Leand

Doubles
- (Switzerland) Christiane Jolissaint (Netherlands) Marcella Mesker
← 1983 ·	Pittsburgh Open

The 1984 Pittsburgh Open, also known as the Ginny of Pittsburgh, was a women's tennis tournament played on indoor carpet courts at the Greentree Racquet Club in Pittsburgh, Pennsylvania in the United States that was part of the Ginny Tournament Circuit (Note: The 1984 Ginny Tournament Circuit consisted of eight $50,000 events played between February and September, followed by a $100,000 Ginny Championships in January 1985. All tournaments were held in the United States.) of the 1984 Virginia Slims World Championship Series. It was the third edition of the tournament and was held from January 23 through January 29, 1984. Fifth-seeded Andrea Leand won the singles title.

== Finals ==
=== Singles ===
(United States) Andrea Leand defeated (France) Pascale Paradis 0–6, 6–2, 6–4

- It was Leand's 1st and only career singles title.

=== Doubles ===
(Switzerland) Christiane Jolissaint / (Netherlands) Marcella Mesker defeated (United States) Anna-Maria Fernandez / (United States) Trey Lewis 7–6, 6–4

- It was Jolissaint's 1st title of the year and the 2nd of her career. It was Mesker's 2nd title of the year and the 4th of her career.
