= 1984 Pittsburgh Open – Singles =

Singles
- 1984 Pittsburgh Open

Final
- Champion: (United States) Andrea Leand
- Runner-up: (France) Pascale Paradis
- Score: 0–6, 6–2, 6–4

Details
- Draw: 32 (4Q)
- Seeds: 8

Events
| Singles | Doubles |
| ← 1983 · | Pittsburgh Open |

Ginny Purdy was the defending champion, but she chose to compete at Marco Island during the same week, losing in the first round to Laura Gildemeister.

Andrea Leand won the title by defeating Pascale Paradis 0–6, 6–2, 6–4 in the final.

== Seeds ==
1. (South Africa) Rosalyn Fairbank (semifinals)
2. (Switzerland) Christiane Jolissaint (first round)
3. (South Africa) Yvonne Vermaak (first round)
4. (Netherlands) Marcella Mesker (quarterfinals)
5. (United States) Andrea Leand (champion)
6. (Sweden) Catrin Jexell (second round)
7. (South Africa) Jennifer Mundel (first round)
8. (United States) Peanut Louie Harper (semifinals)

== Draw ==
=== Key ===
- Q = Qualifier
- WC = Wild card
- LL = Lucky loser
- Alt = Alternate
- SE = Special exempt
- PR = Protected ranking
- ITF = ITF entry
- JE = Junior exempt
- w/o = Walkover
- r = Retired
- d = Defaulted
- SR = Special ranking

=== Finals ===
Semifinals
1 | (South Africa) Rosalyn Fairbank | 3 | 6
(France) Pascale Paradis | 6 | 7
8 | (United States) Peanut Louie Harper | 1 | 1
5 | (United States) Andrea Leand | 6 | 6

Final
(France) Pascale Paradis | 6 | 2 | 4
5 | (United States) Andrea Leand | 0 | 6 | 6

=== Top half ===
First round
1 | (South Africa) R Fairbank | 6 | 7
(United States) J Harrington | 4 | 5
(United States) G Fernández | 1 | 6 | 4
(Brazil) C Monteiro | 6 | 1 | 6
Q | (United States) K Steinmetz | 6 | 6
(United States) S Solomon | 0 | 2
(France) C Suire | 6 | 6
7 | (South Africa) J Mundel | 3 | 2
4 | (Netherlands) M Mesker | 7 | 6
Q | (United States) N Yeargin | 6 | 2
(United States) M Werdel | 2 | 2
(Soviet Union) N Reva | 6 | 6
Q | (Soviet Union) S Cherneva | 5 | 6 | 4
(France) P Paradis | 7 | 4 | 6
(United States) AM Fernandez | 1 | 4
6 | (Sweden) C Jexell | 6 | 6

Second round
1 | (South Africa) R Fairbank | 4 | 6 | 7
(Brazil) C Monteiro | 6 | 1 | 5
Q | (United States) K Steinmetz | 6 | 3 | 2
(France) C Suire | 1 | 6 | 6
4 | (Netherlands) M Mesker | 6 | 6
(Soviet Union) N Reva | 1 | 1
(France) P Paradis | 3 | 6 | 7
6 | (Sweden) C Jexell | 6 | 1 | 6

Quarterfinals
1 | (South Africa) R Fairbank | 4 | 6 | 6
(France) C Suire | 6 | 3 | 4
4 | (Netherlands) M Mesker | 4 | 7 | 1
(France) P Paradis | 6 | 6 | 6

Semifinals
1 | (South Africa) R Fairbank | 3 | 6
(France) P Paradis | 6 | 7

=== Bottom half ===
First round
8 | (United States) P Louie Harper | 6 | 6
(United States) K Latham | 3 | 0
(Australia) E Smylie | 6 | 4 | 7
(South Africa) B Mould | 2 | 6 | 5
(United States) L Antonoplis | 7 | 6
Q | (United Kingdom) A Brown | 6 | 3
(United States) S Acker | 6 | 6 | 7
3 | (South Africa) Y Vermaak | 4 | 7 | 5
5 | (United States) A Leand | 7 | 6
(Peru) P Vásquez | 5 | 3
(United States) V Nelson-Dunbar | 2 | 0
(France) MC Calleja | 6 | 6
(France) N Herreman | 6 | 6
(United States) H Ludloff | 3 | 2
(Japan) E Inoue | 6 | 6
2 | (Switzerland) C Jolissaint | 2 | 4

Second round
8 | (United States) P Louie Harper | 6 | 4 | 6
(Australia) E Smylie | 2 | 6 | 2
(United States) L Antonoplis | 4 | 6 | 6
(United States) S Acker | 6 | 1 | 4
5 | (United States) A Leand | 6 | 6
(France) MC Calleja | 2 | 0
(France) N Herreman | 1 | 0
(Japan) E Inoue | 6 | 6

Quarterfinals
8 | (United States) P Louie Harper | 6 | 6
(United States) L Antonoplis | 4 | 4
5 | (United States) A Leand | 6 | 6
(Japan) E Inoue | 4 | 4

Semifinals
8 | (United States) P Louie Harper | 1 | 1
5 | (United States) A Leand | 6 | 6
