= 1983 Pittsburgh Open – Singles =

Singles
- 1983 Pittsburgh Open

Final
- Champion: (United States) Ginny Purdy
- Runner-up: (Brazil) Cláudia Monteiro
- Score: 6–2, 7–5

Details
- Draw: 32
- Seeds: 8

Events
Singles	Doubles
← 1979 ·	Pittsburgh Open	· 1984 →

Ginny Purdy won in the final 6–2, 7–5 against Cláudia Monteiro.

== Seeds ==
A champion seed is indicated in bold text while text in italics indicates the round in which that seed was eliminated.

1. (United States) Susan Mascarin (second round)
2. (United States) Candy Reynolds (quarterfinals)
3. (Romania) Lucia Romanov (first round)
4. (United States) Betsy Nagelsen (semifinals)
5. (United States) Nancy Yeargin (first round)
6. (Brazil) Patricia Medrado (first round)
7. (United States) Vicki Nelson (first round)
8. (South Africa) Jennifer Mundel (second round)

== Draw ==
=== Key ===
- Q = Qualifier
- WC = Wild card
- LL = Lucky loser
- Alt = Alternate
- SE = Special exempt
- PR = Protected ranking
- ITF = ITF entry
- JE = Junior exempt
- w/o = Walkover
- r = Retired
- d = Defaulted
- SR = Special ranking

First round
1	(United States) **S Mascarin**	**6**	**6**
(Italy) B Rossi	0	2
Q	(Peru) **P Vásquez**	**7**	**6**
(Australia) A Minter	6	3
(United States) A Henricksson	4	5
(Brazil) **C Monteiro**	**6**	**7**
LL	(United States) **T Lewis**	**6**	**6**
6	(Brazil) P Medrado	0	1
4	(United States) **B Nagelsen**	**6**	**6**
(South Africa) S Rollinson	3	2
(United States) P Smith	5	3
(France) **C Vanier**	**7**	**6**
(United States) **G Rush**	**6**	**6**
(United States) S Solomon	2	2
Q	(United States) J Hepner	**7**	2	2
8	(South Africa) **J Mundel**	6	**6**	**6**
7	(United States) V Nelson	5	1
LL	(Italy) **R Reggi**	**7**	**6**
(United States) B Jordan	5	3
(United States) **B Norton**	**7**	**6**
Q	(United States) **S Rimes**	3	**6**	**6**
Q	(United States) E Tell	**6**	1	4
(United States) **A Holton**	**7**	**6**
3	(Romania) L Romanov	5	3
5	(United States) N Yeargin	2	3
(United States) **K Sands**	**6**	**6**
LL	(United States) **G Purdy**	**7**	**7**
(United States) R Blount	6	6
(United States) **K Jones-Shaefer**	2	**6**	**6**
(United Kingdom) A Hobbs	**6**	0	1
(Czechoslovakia) Y Brzáková	3	**6**	1
2	(United States) **C Reynolds**	**6**	4	**6**

Second round
1	(United States) S Mascarin	4	1
Q	(Peru) **P Vásquez**	**6**	**6**
(Brazil) **C Monteiro**	0	**7**	**6**
LL	(United States) T Lewis	**6**	6	3
4	(United States) **B Nagelsen**	3	**6**	**7**
(France) C Vanier	**6**	4	5
(United States) **G Rush**	**7**	4	**6**
8	(South Africa) J Mundel	5	**6**	4
LL	(Italy) R Reggi	3	**6**	0
(United States) **B Norton**	**6**	3	**6**
Q	(United States) S Rimes	4	**6**	1
(United States) **A Holton**	**6**	2	**6**
(United States) K Sands	4	**6**	2
LL	(United States) **G Purdy**	**6**	4	**6**
(United States) K Jones-Shaefer	4	1
2	(United States) **C Reynolds**	**6**	**6**

Quarterfinals
Q	(Peru) P Vásquez	2	5
(Brazil) **C Monteiro**	**6**	**7**
4	(United States) **B Nagelsen**	**7**	**6**
(United States) G Rush	5	4
(United States) B Norton	0	**7**	5
(United States) **A Holton**	**6**	5	**7**
LL	(United States) **G Purdy**	**6**
2	(United States) C Reynolds	2	r

Semifinals
(Brazil) **C Monteiro**	**6**	4	**7**
4	(United States) B Nagelsen	1	**6**	6
(United States) A Holton
LL	(United States) **G Purdy**

Final
(Brazil) Cláudia Monteiro	2	5
LL	(United States) **Ginny Purdy**	**6**	**7**
