= Pittsburgh Open =

Defunct tennis tournament
- Event name: Pittsburgh Open
- Tour: WTA Tour
- Founded: 1979
- Abolished: 1984
- Editions: 3
- Surface: Carpet

The Pittsburgh Open is a defunct WTA Tour affiliated women's tennis tournament played from 1979 to 1984. It was held in Pittsburgh, Pennsylvania in the United States and played on indoor carpet courts.

== Results ==
=== Singles ===
Year	Champions	Runners-up	Score
1979	(United Kingdom) Sue Barker	(United States) Renée Richards	6–3, 6–1
1980 - 1982	Not held		
1983	(United States) Ginny Purdy	(Brazil) Cláudia Monteiro	6–2, 7–5
1984	(United States) Andrea Leand	(France) Pascale Paradis	0–6, 6–2, 6–4

=== Doubles ===
Year	Champions	Runners-up	Score
1979	(United Kingdom) Sue Barker (United States) Candy Reynolds	(United States) Bunny Bruning (United States) Jane Stratton	6–3, 6–2
1980 - 1982	Not held		
1983	(United States) Candy Reynolds (United States) Paula Smith	(Poland) Iwona Kuczyńska (United States) Trey Lewis	6–2, 6–2
1984	(Switzerland) Christiane Jolissaint (Netherlands) Marcella Mesker	(United States) Anna-Maria Fernandez (United States) Trey Lewis	7–6, 6–4
