= 1983 Pittsburgh Open – Doubles =

Doubles
- 1983 Pittsburgh Open

Final
- Champions: (United States) Candy Reynolds (United States) Paula Smith
- Runners-up: (Poland) Iwona Kuczyńska (United States) Trey Lewis
- Score: 6–2, 6–2

Events
Singles	Doubles
← 1979 ·	Pittsburgh Open	· 1984 →

Candy Reynolds and Paula Smith won in the final 6–2, 6–2 against Iwona Kuczyńska and Trey Lewis.

== Seeds ==
Champion seeds are indicated in bold text while text in italics indicates the round in which those seeds were eliminated.

1. (United States) **Candy Reynolds** / (United States) **Paula Smith (champions)**
2. (Brazil) Patricia Medrado / (Brazil) Cláudia Monteiro (quarterfinals)
3. (United States) Barbara Jordan / (United States) Betsy Nagelsen (semifinals)
4. (United Kingdom) Anne Hobbs / (Australia) Susan Leo (semifinals)

== Draw ==
=== Key ===
- Q = Qualifier
- WC = Wild card
- LL = Lucky loser
- Alt = Alternate
- SE = Special exempt
- PR = Protected ranking
- ITF = ITF entry
- JE = Junior exempt
- w/o = Walkover
- r = Retired
- d = Defaulted
- SR = Special ranking

First round
1	(United States) **C Reynolds** (United States) **P Smith**	**6**	**6**
(United States) A Henricksson (Australia) P Whytcross	3	3
(Australia) B Remilton (Australia) A Tobin	3	**6**	5
(United States) **K Sands** (United States) **N Yeargin**	**6**	4	**7**
4	(United Kingdom) **A Hobbs** (Australia) **S Leo**	**6**	3	**6**
(Romania) L Romanov (France) C Vanier	4	**6**	1
(United States) K O'Brien (United States) G Rush	3	2
(United States) **S Mascarin** (Australia) **E Sayers**	**6**	**6**
(United States) A Holton (Italy) R Reggi	6	3
(United States) **R Blount** (United States) **V Nelson**	**7**	**6**
(United States) J Davis (United States) D Robb	1	2
3	(United States) **B Jordan** (United States) **B Nagelsen**	**6**	**6**
(Poland) **I Kuczyńska** (United States) **T Lewis**	**6**	**6**
(South Africa) J Mundel (South Africa) S Rollinson	1	4
(Argentina) R Giscafré (Spain) C Perea-Alcalá	2	**6**	6
2	(Brazil) **P Medrado** (Brazil) **C Monteiro**	**6**	4	**7**

Quarterfinals
1	(United States) **C Reynolds** (United States) **P Smith**	**7**	**6**
(United States) K Sands (United States) N Yeargin	6	3
4	(United Kingdom) **A Hobbs** (Australia) **S Leo**	**6**	**7**
(United States) S Mascarin (Australia) E Sayers	4	6
(United States) R Blount (United States) V Nelson	2	3
3	(United States) **B Jordan** (United States) **B Nagelsen**	**6**	**6**
(Poland) **I Kuczyńska** (United States) **T Lewis**	**7**	3	**6**
2	(Brazil) P Medrado (Brazil) C Monteiro	6	**6**	3

Semifinals
1	(United States) **C Reynolds** (United States) **P Smith**	**7**	2	**6**
4	(United Kingdom) A Hobbs (Australia) S Leo	5	**6**	2
3	(United States) B Jordan (United States) B Nagelsen	4	**6**	4
(Poland) **I Kuczyńska** (United States) **T Lewis**	**6**	3	**6**

Final
1	(United States) **Candy Reynolds** (United States) **Paula Smith**	**6**	**6**
(Poland) Iwona Kuczyńska (United States) Trey Lewis	2	2
