= 1985 Ginny Championships =

- Date: January 2–6
- Edition: 2nd
- Draw: 14S / 5D
- Prize money: $100,000
- Surface: Carpet / indoors
- Location: Port St. Lucie, Florida, U.S.
- Venue: Sandpiper Bay Resort

Champions

Singles
- (Sweden) Catarina Lindqvist

Doubles
- (United States) Betsy Nagelsen / (United States) Paula Smith
← 1984 ·	Ginny Championships

The 1985 Virginia Slims Ginny Championships was a women's tennis tournament played on indoor carpet courts at the Sandpiper Bay Resort in Port St. Lucie, Florida, in the United States that was part of the 1984 Virginia Slims World Championship Series. It was the second and last edition of the tournament and was held from January 2, 1985, through January 6, 1985. Catarina Lindqvist won the singles title.

== Finals ==
=== Singles ===
(Sweden) Catarina Lindqvist defeated (United States) Terry Holladay 6–3, 6–1

- It was Lindqvist's 3rd singles title of the year and of her career.

=== Doubles ===
(United States) Betsy Nagelsen / (United States) Paula Smith defeated (Switzerland) Christiane Jolissaint / (Netherlands) Marcella Mesker 6–4, 6–1

- It was Nagelsen's 4th title of the year and the 15th of her career. It was Smith's 4th title of the year and the 12th of her career.
