= 1983 Queen's Grand Prix =

- Date: 12–18 September
- Edition: 11th
- Draw: 28S
- Prize money: $175,000
- Surface: Carpet / indoor
- Location: Tokyo, Japan
- Venue: Yoyogi National Gymnasium

Champions

Singles
- (United States) Lisa Bonder
- Pan Pacific Open

The 1983 Queen's Grand Prix was a women's tennis tournament played on indoor carpet courts in Tokyo, Japan that was part of the 1983 Virginia Slims World Championship Series. The tournament was held from 12 September through 18 September 1983. Unseeded Lisa Bonder won the singles title and earned $40,000 first-prize money as well as 100 Virginia Slims ranking points.

== Finals ==
=== Singles ===
(United States) Lisa Bonder defeated (United States) Andrea Jaeger 6–2, 5–7, 6–1

- It was Bonder's 1st singles title of the year and the 3rd of her career.
