= Iwona Kuczyńska =

Polish tennis player

- Country (sports): Poland
- Born: 22 February 1961 (age 65) Poland
- Turned pro: 1981
- Retired: 1990
- Plays: Right-handed
- Prize money: US$ 142,260

Singles
- Career record: 25–43
- Career titles: 1 ITF
- Highest ranking: No. 64 (12 October 1987)

Grand Slam singles results
- Australian Open: 1R (1989)
- French Open: 3R (1981)
- Wimbledon: 3R (1987, 1988)
- US Open: 2R (1987, 1988)

Doubles
- Career record: 37–43
- Career titles: 1 WTA, 6 ITF
- Highest ranking: No. 35 (16 January 1989)

Grand Slam doubles results
- Australian Open: 1R (1989)
- French Open: 2R (1984, 1986, 1987)
- Wimbledon: 1R (1984, 1985, 1986, 1987, 1989)
- US Open: 2R (1982, 1984)

Mixed doubles
- Career record: 3–5
- Career titles: 0

Grand Slam mixed doubles results
- Australian Open: 1R (1989)
- French Open: 3R (1984)

Iwona Kuczyńska (born 22 February 1961) is a retired tennis player from Poland. Her highest WTA singles ranking was No. 64, reached on 12 October 1987, while her highest doubles ranking was No. 35, reached on 16 January 1989.

== Career ==
On the WTA Tour, she won one doubles title in Filderstadt 1988, partnering with Martina Navratilova and reached the final two more times, in Pittsburgh 1983 and in San Diego 1984, both times partnering with Trey Lewis.

On the ITF circuit, she won one singles title and six doubles titles. She was also part of the Fed Cup team Poland and represented her country at the Fed Cup competition in both singles and in doubles. Kuczyńska retired from professional tennis in 1990.

== Personal life ==
She lived in Omice, Czech Republic, with her partner, former Czech tennis player Jana Novotná.

== WTA career finals ==
=== Doubles 3 (1 title, 2 runner-ups) ===
Legend
Grand Slam	0
WTA Championships	0
Tier I	0
Tier II	0
Tier III	1
Tier IV & V	0

Titles by surface
Hard	0
Clay	0
Grass	0
Carpet	1

Result	W/L	Date	Tournament	Surface	Partner	Opponents	Score
Loss	0–1	Mar 1983	Pittsburgh, United States	Carpet (i)	(United States) Trey Lewis	(United States) Candy Reynolds (United States) Paula Smith	2–6, 2–6
Loss	0–2	Sep 1984	San Diego, United States	Hard	(United States) Terry Holladay	(United States) Betsy Nagelsen (United States) Paula Smith	2–6, 4–6
Win	1–2	Oct 1988	Filderstadt, Germany	Carpet (i)	(United States) Martina Navratilova	(Italy) Raffaella Reggi (South Africa) Elna Reinach	6–1, 6–4

== ITF finals ==
=== Singles (1–1) ===
Legend
$25,000 tournaments
$10,000 tournaments

Result	No.	Date	Tournament	Surface	Opponent	Score
Win	1.	19 January 1987	ITF Bayonne, France	Carpet (i)	(France) Catherine Mothes	2–6, 6–3, 6–4
Loss	1.	4 December 1989	ITF Le Havre, France	Clay	(France) Nathalie Herreman	4–6, 6–7^{(5)}

=== Doubles (6–3) ===
Result	No.	Date	Tournament	Surface	Partner	Opponents	Score
Win	1.	12 July 1981	ITF Marseille, France	Clay	(Romania) Florența Mihai	(France) Isabelle Vernhes (Italy) Daniela Porzio	6–7, 6–2, 6–1
Win	2.	26 July 1981	ITF Loano, Italy	Clay	(Italy) Sabina Simmonds	(Hungary) Katalin Farkas (Hungary) Éva Rózsavölgyi	6–3, 6–1
Win	3.	9 August 1981	ITF Sezze, Italy	Clay	(Italy) Sabina Simmonds	(Australia) Chris O'Neil (Sweden) Mimmi Wikstedt	6–0, 6–4
Win	4.	16 August 1981	ITF Nicolosi, Italy	Clay	(Italy) Sabina Simmonds	(Argentina) Andrea Tiezzi (Argentina) Isabelle Villaverde	6–3, 6–1
Loss	5.	15 August 1982	ITF Baltimore, United States	Hard	(United States) Wendy Luhmann	(United States) JoAnne Russell (United States) Laura duPont	2–6, 2–6
Win	6.	21 July 1986	ITF Stuttgart, West Germany	Clay	(Czechoslovakia) Hana Fukárková	(Sweden) Anneli Björk (United Kingdom) Sarah Sullivan	7–5, 6–0
Loss	7.	19 January 1987	ITF Bayonne, France	Hard (i)	(France) Corinne Vanier	(Romania) Virginia Ruzici (France) Catherine Tanvier	3–6, 2–6
Loss	8.	20 April 1987	ITF Monviso, Italy	Clay	(Czechoslovakia) Hana Fukárková	(Soviet Union) Viktoria Milvidskaia (Soviet Union) Aida Halatian	5–7, 3–6
Win	9.	26 March 1990	ITF Limoges, France	Carpet (i)	(Belgium) Ann Devries	(France) Catherine Tanvier (France) Sandrine Testud	6–3, 3–6, 6–4

=== Head-to-head record ===
- Chris Evert 0–1
- Arantxa Sánchez Vicario 0–1
