= Andrea Leand =

American tennis player

- Country (sports): United States
- Born: January 18, 1964 (age 62) Baltimore, USA
- Height: 5 ft 8 in (1.73 m)
- Turned pro: 1982
- Retired: 1996
- Plays: Right-handed
- College: Princeton University; Johns Hopkins University Carey Business School
- Prize money: US$ 346,947

Singles
- Career record: 142–151
- Career titles: 1
- Highest ranking: No. 12 (May, 1982), holds the WTA record for best first time appearance on the WTA rankings at No.18

Grand Slam singles results
- Australian Open: 2R (1982, 1984)
- French Open: 4R (1982)
- Wimbledon: 3R (1983, 1990)
- US Open: 4R (1981, 1982, 1983)

Other tournaments
- Olympic Games: 2R (1984)

Doubles
- Career record: 57–89
- Career titles: 1

Grand Slam doubles results
- Australian Open: 2R (1990)
- French Open: 3R (1985)
- Wimbledon: QF (1983)
- US Open: 2R (1981, 1983, 1984)

Mixed doubles
- Career record: 3–5
- Career titles: 0

Grand Slam mixed doubles results
- French Open: 3R (1985)
- Wimbledon: 2R (1983)
Medal record
Maccabiah Games
| Gold medal – first place | 1981 Israel | Women's singles |

Andrea Leand (born January 18, 1964) is a former professional tennis player from the U.S. Leand was the No. 1 ranked junior in the United States and the No. 2 ranked junior in the World in 1981. She won a gold medal in singles at the 1981 Maccabiah Games in Israel. Leand rose to a career high ranking of No. 12. Leand was ranked in the top 10 of the world doubles rankings reaching the quarterfinals at Wimbledon in 1983. Leand represented the United States at the Federation Cup in 1982 and the Olympics in 1984.

== Early life ==
Leand is the first child of Paul Leand, a chest and throat surgeon who in college played tennis for Yale University, and Barbara Goldberg Leand, who once had a tennis ranking in the Middle Atlantic region.

== Education ==
In 1988, Leand graduated from Princeton University, where she completed a Bachelor of Science degree in psychology. She also earned an MBA degree from Johns Hopkins University Carey Business School in 2002.

== Career in sports ==
Andrea Leand was the No. 1 ranked junior in the United States and the No. 2 ranked junior in the World in 1981. She won a gold medal in women's singles at the 1981 Maccabiah Games in Israel.

She turned pro in 1982 and appeared on the WTA pro rankings for the first time at No.18, a record for the highest first-time appearance in the pro tennis rankings that she still holds today. Leand rose to a career high No. 12. Leand was ranked in the top 10 of the world doubles rankings reaching the quarterfinals at Wimbledon in 1983.

Leand represented the United States at the Federation Cup in 1982 and the Olympics in 1984. She competed on the WTA tour from 1981 to 1994. She won a singles title at the Pittsburgh Open in 1984 after a three-sets victory in the final against Pascale Paradis. Leand reached the fourth round of the US Open on three occasions, at Wimbledon once, and the French Open once. She upset second-seeded Andrea Jaeger at the 1981 U.S. Open.

== Later career ==
After 15 years on the pro tour, Leand pursued careers in journalism and broadcasting, as contributor to multiple publications including USA Today, The New York Times, and The Baltimore Sun and TennisMatch Magazine. She also was a lead commentator for ESPN/STAR television for 10 years. She later became certified as an investment advisor for Morgan Stanley. Leand was named publisher of Tennis Week Magazine in 2007.

== WTA career finals ==
=== Singles (1 title) ===
| Result | W/L | Date | Tournament | Surface | Opponent | Score |
|---|---|---|---|---|---|---|
| Win | 1–0 | Jan 1984 | Pittsburgh, Pennsylvania, US | Carpet (i) | (France) Pascale Paradis | 0–6, 6–2, 6–4 |

=== Doubles (1 title, 2 runner-ups) ===
| Winner — Legend Grand Slam tournaments (0–0) WTA Tour Championships (0–0) Tier I (0–0) Tier II (0–0) Tier III (0–0) Tier IV (0–0) Tier V (0–0) Virginia Slims (1–2) | Finals by surface Hard (0–1) Grass (0–0) Clay (0–0) Carpet (1–1) |

| Result | W/L | Date | Tournament | Surface | Partner | Opponents | Score |
|---|---|---|---|---|---|---|---|
| Loss | 0–1 | Mar 1984 | Boston, Massachusetts, US | Carpet (i) | (United States) Mary Lou Piatek | (United States) Barbara Potter (United States) Sharon Walsh | 6–7^{(4–7)}, 0–6 |
| Loss | 0–2 | May 1984 | Johannesburg, South Africa | Hard | (United States) Sandy Collins | (South Africa) Rosalyn Fairbank (South Africa) Beverly Mould | 1–6, 2–6 |
| Win | 1–2 | Oct 1984 | Zürich, Switzerland | Carpet (i) | (Hungary) Andrea Temesvári | (West Germany) Claudia Kohde-Kilsch (Czechoslovakia) Hana Mandlíková | 6–1, 6–3 |
