= Pascale Paradis =

French tennis player (born 1966)

- Full name: Pascale Paradis-Mangon
- Country (sports): France
- Born: 24 April 1966 (age 60) Troyes, France
- Height: 1.75 m (5 ft 9 in)
- Retired: 1993
- Plays: Right-handed
- Prize money: US$577,710

Singles
- Career record: 137–158
- Career titles: 0
- Highest ranking: No. 20 (21 November 1988)

Grand Slam singles results
- Australian Open: 3R (1984)
- French Open: 3R (1993)
- Wimbledon: QF (1988)
- US Open: 4R (1983)

Doubles
- Career record: 103–138
- Career titles: 2
- Highest ranking: No. 38 (10 October 1988)

Grand Slam doubles results
- Australian Open: QF (1985)
- French Open: QF (1985, 1988)
- Wimbledon: 3R (1985)
- US Open: 3R (1985)

Pascale Paradis-Mangon (French pronunciation: [paskal paʁadi]; born 24 April 1966) is a French former professional tennis player.

Paradis was the World Junior Champion in women's singles in 1983. She reached the quarterfinals at Wimbledon in 1988, defeating Manuela Maleeva, Nathalie Herreman, Robin White and Anne Minter, and then she lost to Steffi Graf. She finished 1988 ranked number 20 on the WTA rankings. She won two doubles titles on the WTA Tour during her career. She retired in 1993 with a 137–158 win–loss record in singles.

== WTA Tour finals ==
=== Singles: 3 (3 runner-ups) ===
Legend
Grand Slam	0
Tier I	0
Tier II	0
Tier III	0
Tier IV & V	0

Result	W/L	Date	Tournament	Surface	Opponent	Score
Loss	0–1	Jan 1984	Pittsburgh, U.S.	Carpet (i)	(United States) Andrea Leand	6–0, 2–6, 4–6
Loss	0–2	Feb 1984	Indianapolis, U.S.	Hard (i)	(United States) JoAnne Russell	6–7, 2–6
Loss	0–3	Feb 1992	Linz, Austria	Carpet (i)	(Ukraine) Natalia Medvedeva	4–6, 2–6

=== Doubles: 6 (2 titles, 4 runner-ups) ===
Legend
Grand Slam	0
Tier I	0
Tier II	0
Tier III	0
Tier IV & V	0

Titles by surface
Hard	0
Clay	0
Grass	0
Carpet	2

Result	W/L	Date	Tournament	Surface	Partner	Opponents	Score
Loss	0–1	Mar 1985	Dallas, U.S.	Carpet (i)	(Netherlands) Marcella Mesker	(United States) Barbara Potter (United States) Sharon Walsh	7–5, 4–6, 6–7
Loss	0–2	Aug 1985	Canadian Open	Hard	(Netherlands) Marcella Mesker	(United States) Gigi Fernández (United States) Martina Navratilova	4–6, 0–6
Win	1–2	Mar 1986	Oklahoma City, U.S.	Carpet (i)	(Netherlands) Marcella Mesker	(United States) Lori McNeil (France) Catherine Suire	2–6, 7–6, 6–1
Win	2–2	Nov 1987	Zurich, Switzerland	Carpet (i)	(France) Nathalie Herreman	(Czechoslovakia) Jana Novotná (France) Catherine Suire	6–3, 2–6, 6–3
Loss	2–3	Apr 1990	Singapore	Hard	(France) Catherine Suire	(United Kingdom) Jo Durie (Canada) Jill Hetherington	4–6, 1–6
Loss	2–4	Apr 1992	Pattaya, Thailand	Hard	(France) Sandrine Testud	(France) Isabelle Demongeot (Ukraine) Natalia Medvedeva	1–6, 1–6

== ITF finals ==
=== Singles (2–1) ===
Legend
$50,000 tournaments
$25,000 tournaments
$10,000 tournaments

Result	No.	Date	Tournament	Surface	Opponent	Score
Loss	1.	24 October 1982	Newcastle, Australia	Grass	(Australia) Annette Gulley	3–6, 7–6, 4–6
Win	2.	18 July 1983	Kitzbühel, Austria	Clay	(Austria) Petra Huber	3–6, 6–3, 6–2
Win	3.	26 March 1990	Limoges, France	Carpet (i)	(Czechoslovakia) Karina Habšudová	6–4, 6–4

=== Doubles (2–3) ===
Result	No.	Date	Tournament	Surface	Partner	Opponents	Score
Loss	1.	18 July 1983	Kitzbühel, Austria	Clay	(France) Nathalie Herreman	(New Zealand) Chris Newton (Australia) Pam Whytcross	6–2, 4–6, 6–7
Win	2.	21 March 1988	Bayonne, France	Hard (i)	(France) Catherine Tanvier	(Netherlands) Carin Bakkum (Netherlands) Simone Schilder	4–6, 6–2, 6–4
Win	3.	26 February 1990	Wels, Austria	Clay (i)	(France) Alexia Dechaume-Balleret	(Czechoslovakia) Hana Fukárková (Czechoslovakia) Denisa Krajčovičová	6–3, 6–2
Loss	4.	25 March 1990	Moulins, France	Carpet (i)	(France) Valerie Ledroff	(Bulgaria) Magdalena Maleeva (Czechoslovakia) Andrea Strnadová	6–3, 1–6, 1–6
Loss	5.	9 December 1991	Val-d'Oise, France	Hard (i)	(France) Sandrine Testud	(Germany) Eva Pfaff (France) Catherine Suire	6–4, 3–6, 4–6
