= Paula Smith =

American tennis player

- Country (sports): United States
- Born: January 10, 1957 (age 69) Boulder, Colorado
- Height: 5 ft 7 in (1.70 m)
- Plays: Right-handed
- Prize money: US$ 426,717

Singles
- Career record: 54–103
- Career titles: 2
- Highest ranking: No. 48 (February 1981)

Grand Slam singles results
- Australian Open: 1R (1981, 1982, 1983)
- French Open: 3R (1982, 1983)
- Wimbledon: 2R (1978, 1981, 1982)
- US Open: 3R (1980)

Doubles
- Career record: 304–214
- Career titles: 13
- Highest ranking: No. 23 (December 1984)

Grand Slam doubles results
- Australian Open: QF (1982, 1983)
- French Open: F (1981)
- Wimbledon: SF (1980)
- US Open: QF (1978, 1979, 1980, 1984)

Grand Slam mixed doubles results
- French Open: F (1985)
- Wimbledon: 3R (1984)
- US Open: SF (1981)

Paula Smith (born January 10, 1957) is an American former tennis player.

Smith played 100 tour singles matches and 300 doubles matches from 1976 to 1988. She reached the finals of the French Open once in 1981, partnering Candy Reynolds, and again in mixed doubles in 1985, partnering Francisco González and losing to Martina Navratilova and Heinz Günthardt. She also reached the finals of the 1982 Toyota Series Championships, the 1983 Family Circle Cup and the final of the doubles in Indiana in 1985.

== WTA Tour finals ==
=== Doubles 27 (13–14) ===
Legend
| Grand Slam | 0 |
| WTA Championships | 1 |
| Tier I | 0 |
| Tier II | 0 |
| Tier III | 0 |
| Tier IV & V | 0 |

Titles by surface
| Hard | 5 |
| Clay | 5 |
| Grass | 1 |
| Carpet | 2 |

| Result | No. | Date | Tournament | Surface | Partner | Opponents | Score |
|---|---|---|---|---|---|---|---|
| Loss | 1. | Aug 1978 | Canadian Open, Canada | Hard | (Australia) Chris O'Neil | (Czechoslovakia) Regina Maršíková (United States) Pam Teeguarden | 5–7, 7–6, 2–6 |
| Loss | 2. | Aug 1979 | USCC Indianapolis, U.S. | Clay | (United States) Penny Johnson | (United States) Kathy Jordan (United States) Anne Smith | 1–6, 0–6 |
| Loss | 3. | Apr 1980 | Hilton Head, South Carolina, U.S. | Clay | (United States) Candy Reynolds | (United States) Kathy Jordan (United States) Anne Smith | 2–6, 1–6 |
| Win | 1. | Aug 1980 | USCC Indianapolis, U.S. | Clay | (United States) Anne Smith | (Romania) Virginia Ruzici (Czechoslovakia) Renáta Tomanová | 4–6, 6–3, 6–4 |
| Win | 2. | Oct 1980 | Phoenix, Arizona, U.S. | Hard | (United States) Pam Shriver | (United States) Ann Kiyomura (United States) Candy Reynolds | 6–0, 6–4 |
| Loss | 4. | Nov 1980 | Tampa, Florida, U.S. | Hard | (United States) Anne Smith | (United States) Rosie Casals (United States) Candy Reynolds | 6–7, 5–7 |
| Win | 3. | Apr 1981 | Amelia Island, Florida, U.S. | Clay | (United States) Kathy Jordan | (United States) JoAnne Russell (United States) Pam Shriver | 6–3, 5–7, 7–6 |
| Win | 4. | May 1981 | Perugia, Italy | Clay | (United States) Candy Reynolds | (United States) Chris Evert-Lloyd (Romania) Virginia Ruzici | 7–5, 6–1 |
| Loss | 5. | May 1981 | Lugano, Switzerland | Clay | (United States) Candy Reynolds | (South Africa) Rosalyn Fairbank (South Africa) Tanya Harford | 6–2, 1–6, 4–6 |
| Loss | 6. | Jun 1981 | French Open, France | Clay | (United States) Candy Reynolds | (South Africa) Rosalyn Fairbank (South Africa) Tanya Harford | 1–6, 3–6 |
| Loss | 7. | Aug 1981 | USCC Indianapolis, U.S. | Clay | (United Kingdom) Sue Barker | (United States) JoAnne Russell (Romania) Virginia Ruzici | 2–6, 2–6 |
| Loss | 8. | Oct 1981 | Deerfield Beach, Florida, U.S. | Hard | (United States) Pam Shriver | (United States) Mary-Lou Piatek (United States) Wendy White | 1–6, 6–3, 5–7 |
| Win | 5. | May 1982 | Lugano, Switzerland | Clay | (United States) Candy Reynolds | (United States) JoAnne Russell (Romania) Virginia Ruzici | 6–2, 6–4 |
| Win | 6. | Aug 1982 | San Diego, California, U.S. | Hard | (United States) Kathy Jordan | (Brazil) Patricia Medrado (Brazil) Cláudia Monteiro | 6–3, 5–7, 7–6 |
| Win | 7. | Oct 1982 | Tampa, Florida, U.S. | Hard | (United States) Ann Kiyomura | (United States) Mary-Lou Piatek (United States) Wendy White | 6–2, 6–4 |
| Loss | 9. | Dec 1982 | East Rutherford, New Jersey, U.S. | Hard | (United States) Candy Reynolds | (United States) Martina Navratilova (United States) Pam Shriver | 4–6, 5–7 |
| Loss | 10. | Feb 1983 | Palm Beach, Florida, U.S. | Clay | (United States) Kathy Jordan | (United States) Barbara Potter (United States) Sharon Walsh | 4–6, 6–4, 2–6 |
| Loss | 11. | Mar 1983 | Nashville, Tennessee, U.S. | Hard | (United States) Alycia Moulton | (South Africa) Rosalyn Fairbank (United States) Candy Reynolds | 4–6, 6–7 |
| Win | 8. | Mar 1983 | Pittsburgh, Pennsylvania, U.S. | Carpet | (United States) Candy Reynolds | (Poland) Iwona Kuczyńska (United States) Trey Lewis | 6–2, 6–2 |
| Loss | 12. | Apr 1983 | Hilton Head, South Carolina, U.S. | Clay | (United States) Andrea Jaeger | (United States) Martina Navratilova (United States) Candy Reynolds | 2–6, 3–6 |
| Loss | 13. | Jan 1984 | Nashville, Tennessee, U.S. | Hard | (United States) Mary-Lou Piatek | (United States) Sherry Acker (United States) Candy Reynolds | 7–5, 6–7, 6–7 |
| Win | 9. | Jul 1984 | Newport, Rhode Island, U.S. | Grass | (United States) Alycia Moulton | (United States) Lea Antonoplis (South Africa) Beverly Mould | 7–5, 7–6 |
| Win | 10. | Aug 1984 | USCC Indianapolis, U.S. | Clay | (South Africa) Beverly Mould | (United States) Elise Burgin (United States) JoAnne Russell | 6–2, 7–5 |
| Win | 11. | Sep 1984 | San Diego, California, U.S. | Hard | (United States) Betsy Nagelsen | (United States) Terry Holladay (Poland) Iwona Kuczyńska | 6–2, 6–4 |
| Win | 12. | Oct 1984 | Brighton, England | Carpet | (United States) Alycia Moulton | (United States) Barbara Potter (United States) Sharon Walsh | 6–7, 6–3, 7–5 |
| Win | 13. | Jan 1985 | Port St. Lucie, Florida, U.S. | Hard | (United States) Betsy Nagelsen | (Switzerland) Christiane Jolissaint (Netherlands) Marcella Mesker | 6–3, 6–4 |
| Loss | 14. | Jul 1985 | USCC Indianapolis, U.S. | Clay | (United States) Penny Barg | (Bulgaria) Katerina Maleeva (Bulgaria) Manuela Maleeva | 6–3, 3–6, 6–4 |

=== Mixed doubles 1 ===
Legend
| Grand Slam | 0 |
| WTA Championships | 0 |
| Tier I | 0 |
| Tier II | 0 |
| Tier III | 0 |
| Tier IV & V | 0 |

| Outcome | No. | Date | Tournament | Surface | Partner | Opponents | Score |
|---|---|---|---|---|---|---|---|
| Loss | 1. | Jun 1985 | French Open, France | Clay | (Paraguay) Francisco González | (Switzerland) Heinz Günthardt (United States) Martina Navratilova | 6–2, 3–6, 2–6 |
