= Trey Lewis (tennis) =

American tennis player

- Country (sports): United States
- Born: November 27, 1959 (age 66)
- Turned pro: 1979
- Retired: 1986
- Prize money: $48,323

Singles
- Career record: 14–47

Grand Slam singles results
- French Open: 1R (1981, 1982)
- Wimbledon: 1R (1980, 1983)
- US Open: 2R (1979)

Doubles
- Career record: 16–33

Grand Slam doubles results
- French Open: 2R (1981)
- Wimbledon: 2R (1983)
- US Open: 3R (1981)

Mixed doubles
- Career record: 0–1

Grand Slam mixed doubles results
- US Open: 1R (1979)
Medal record
Women's tennis
Pan American Games
Silver medal – second place	1979 San Juan	Women's singles

Trey Lewis (born November 27, 1959) is an American tennis player who played professionally in the first half of the 1980s.

As a qualifier she advanced past the first round of the 1979 U.S. Open, where she was beaten by Sabina Simmonds in the second round. This was her best performance in a Grand Slam tournament.

Lewis was a member of the 1979 USC Women's Tennis All American Team.

She placed second at the 1979 Pan American Games in San Juan.

== Career finals ==
Legend
Grand Slam	0
WTA Championships	0
Tier I	0
Tier II	0
Tier III	0
Tier IV & V	0
Olympic Games	0

Titles by surface
Hard	0
Clay	0
Grass	0
Carpet	0

=== Singles (0–1) ===
Result	No.	Date	Tournament	Surface	Opponent	Score
Silver	1.	Jul 1979	Pan American Games; San Juan, Puerto Rico	Hard	(United States) Susan Hagey	6–3, 0–6, 2–6

=== Doubles (0–2) ===
Result	No.	Date	Tournament	Surface	Partner	Opponents	Score
Loss	1.	Mar 1983	Pittsburgh, Pennsylvania, U.S.	Carpet	(Poland) Iwona Kuczyńska	(United States) Candy Reynolds (United States) Paula Smith	2–6, 2–6
Loss	2.	Jan 1984	Pittsburgh, Pennsylvania, U.S.	Carpet	(United States) Anna-Maria Fernandez	(Netherlands) Marcella Mesker (Switzerland) Christiane Jolissaint	6–7, 4–6
