= Christiane Jolissaint =

Swiss tennis player (born 1961)

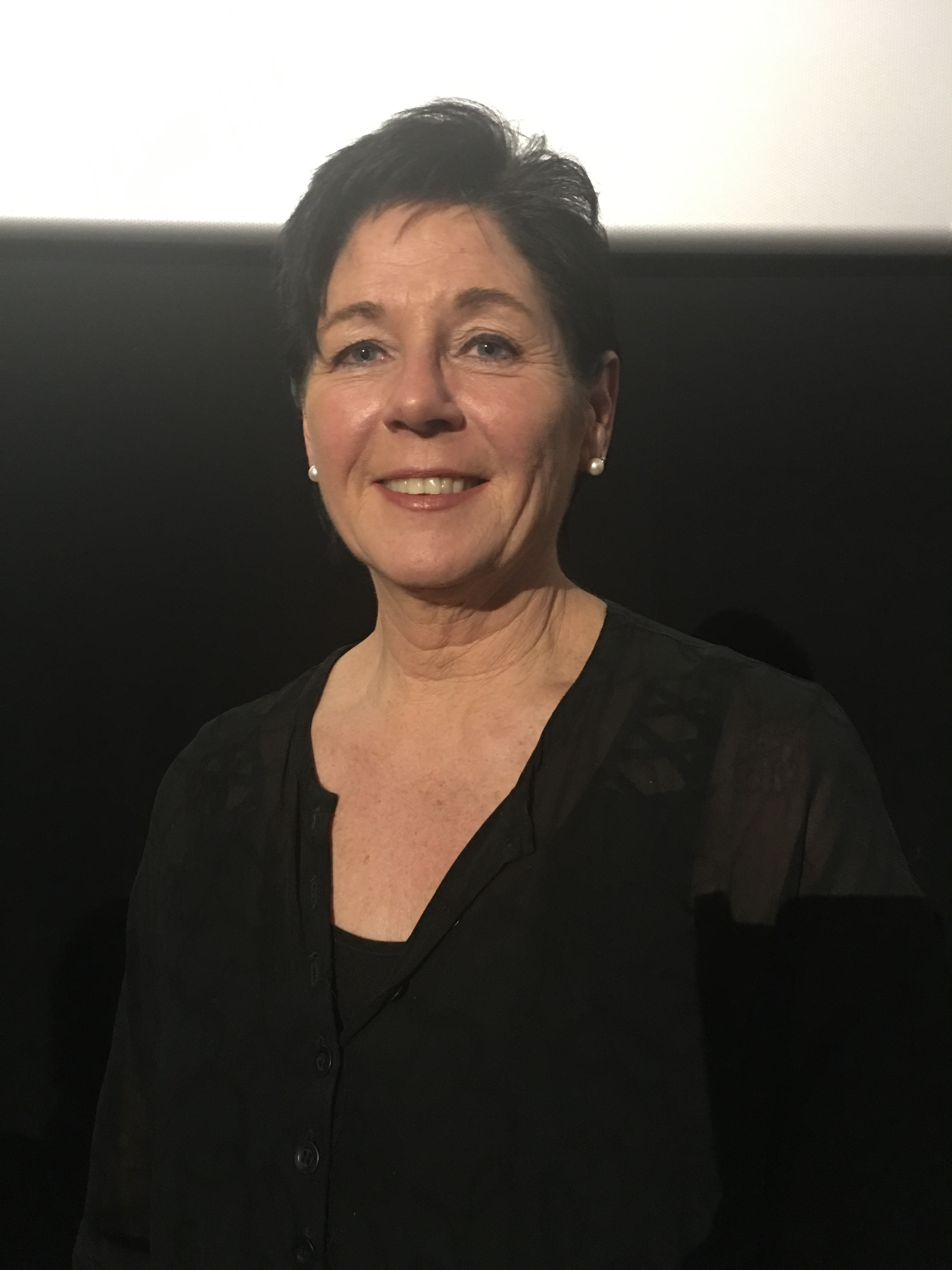
- Jolissaint during a presentation in Geneva in 2017
- Country (sports): Switzerland
- Born: 12 September 1961 (age 64) Vevey, Switzerland
- Height: ̺1.73 m (5 ft 8 in)
- Prize money: US$ 287,488

Singles
- Career record: 92–128
- Highest ranking: No. 28 (5 December 1983)

Doubles
- Career record: 139–130
- Career titles: 5
- Highest ranking: No. 26 (23 May 1988)

Grand Slam doubles results
- Australian Open: QF 1982
- US Open: SF 1984

Christiane Jolissaint (born 12 September 1961) is a former professional tennis player from Switzerland. She won five doubles titles, most often partnering with Marcella Mesker. She reached a highest singles ranking of No. 28 in December 1983 and a highest doubles ranking of No. 26 in May 1988.

== WTA Tour finals ==
=== Doubles 7 (5–2) ===
Legend
Grand Slam	0
WTA Championships	0
Tier I	0
Tier II	0
Tier III	0
Tier IV & V	2

Titles by surface
Hard	1
Clay	2
Grass	1
Carpet	1

Result	W/L	Date	Tournament	Surface	Partner	Opponents	Score
Win	1–0	May 1983	Lugano, Switzerland	Clay	(Netherlands) Marcella Mesker	(Switzerland) Petra Delhees (Brazil) Patricia Medrado	6–2, 3–6, 7–5
Win	2–0	Jan 1984	Pittsburgh, Pennsylvania, U.S.	Carpet	(Netherlands) Marcella Mesker	(United States) Anna-Maria Fernandez (United States) Trey Lewis	7–6, 6–4
Win	3–0	May 1984	Lugano, Switzerland	Hard (i)	(Netherlands) Marcella Mesker	(Czechoslovakia) Iva Budařová (Czechoslovakia) Marcela Skuherská	6–4, 6–3
Loss	3–1	Jan 1985	Port St. Lucie, Florida, U.S.	Hard (o)	(Netherlands) Marcella Mesker	(United States) Betsy Nagelsen (United States) Paula Smith	3–6, 4–6
Loss	3–2	Dec 1987	Buenos Aires, Argentina	Clay	(Canada) Jill Hetherington	(Argentina) Mercedes Paz (Argentina) Gabriela Sabatini	2–6, 2–6
Win	4–2	Jan 1988	Sydney, Australia	Grass	(United States) Ann Henricksson	(West Germany) Claudia Kohde-Kilsch (Czechoslovakia) Helena Suková	7–6, 4–6, 6–3
Win	5–2	May 1988	Geneva, Switzerland	Clay	(South Africa) Dianne Van Rensburg	(Sweden) Maria Lindström (West Germany) Claudia Porwik	6–1, 6–3
