= Marcella Mesker =

Dutch tennis player

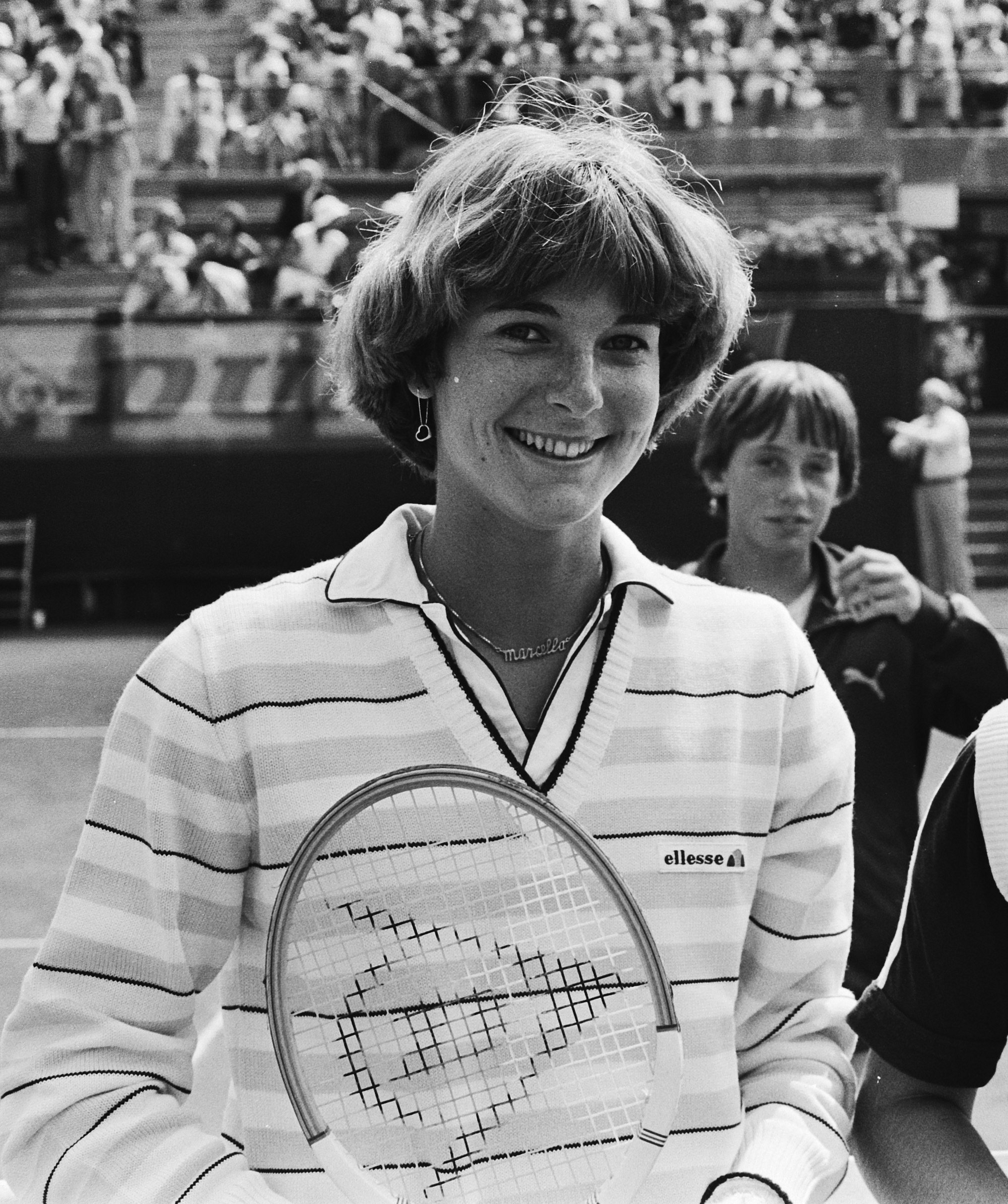
- Country (sports): Netherlands
- Born: 23 May 1959 (age 66) The Hague, the Netherlands
- Prize money: $337,812

Singles
- Career record: 105–138
- Career titles: 1

Grand Slam singles results
- Australian Open: 3R (1984)
- French Open: 3R (1982, 1986)
- Wimbledon: 3R (1979, 1985)
- US Open: 3R (1981)

Doubles
- Career record: 162–133
- Career titles: 6

Grand Slam doubles results
- Australian Open: F (1979)
- French Open: 3R (1986)
- Wimbledon: 2R (1980, 1983, 1984, 1988)
- US Open: SF (1984)

Marcella Mesker (born 23 May 1959) is a former professional tennis player from the Netherlands.

Mesker was active on the WTA Tour from 1979 to 1988 and reached the final of the Australian Open Women's Doubles in 1979. She also reached the semifinals of the US Open Women's Doubles in 1984. She won a singles title in Oklahoma City in 1986.

Mesker is the recipient of the Karen Krantzcke Sportsmanship Award, given by WTA after a vote by fellow tennis pros.

== WTA career finals ==
Legend
Grand Slam
Tier I
Tier II
Tier III
Tier IV & V

=== Singles 1 (1–0) ===
Result	W/L	Date	Tournament	Surface	Opponent	Score
Win	1–0	Mar 1986	Oklahoma City, U.S.	Carpet (i)	(United States) Lori McNeil	6–4, 4–6, 6–3

=== Doubles 14 (6–8) ===
Result	W/L	Date	Tournament	Surface	Partner	Opponents	Score
Loss	1.	Jan 1980	Australian Open	Grass	(Australia) Leanne Harrison	(New Zealand) Judy Chaloner (Australia) Diane Evers	2–6, 6–1, 0–6
Win	1.	May 1983	Lugano, Switzerland	Clay	(Switzerland) Christiane Jolissaint	(Switzerland) Petra Delhees (Brazil) Patricia Medrado	6–2, 3–6, 7–5
Win	2.	Jan 1984	Denver, U.S.	Hard (i)	(United Kingdom) Anne Hobbs	(United States) Sherry Acker (United States) Candy Reynolds	6–2, 6–3
Win	3.	Jan 1984	Pittsburgh, U.S.	Carpet (i)	(Switzerland) Christiane Jolissaint	(United States) Anna-Maria Fernandez (United States) Trey Lewis	7–6, 6–4
Win	4.	May 1984	Lugano, Switzerland	Hard (i)	(Switzerland) Christiane Jolissaint	(Czechoslovakia) Iva Budařová (Czechoslovakia) Marcela Skuherská	6–4, 6–3
Loss	2.	Jan 1985	Port St. Lucie, U.S.	Hard	(Switzerland) Christiane Jolissaint	(United States) Betsy Nagelsen (United States) Paula Smith	3–6, 4–6
Loss	3.	Mar 1985	US Indoors	Carpet (i)	(Australia) Elizabeth Smylie	(United States) Martina Navratilova (United States) Pam Shriver	5–7, 2–6
Loss	4.	Mar 1985	Dallas, U.S.	Carpet (i)	(France) Pascale Paradis	(United States) Barbara Potter (United States) Sharon Walsh	7–5, 4–6, 6–7
Loss	5.	Aug 1985	Canadian Open	Hard	(France) Pascale Paradis	(United States) Gigi Fernández (United States) Martina Navratilova	4–6, 0–6
Win	5.	Nov 1985	Hilversum, Netherlands	Carpet (i)	(France) Catherine Tanvier	(Italy) Sandra Cecchini (Socialist Federal Republic of Yugoslavia) Sabrina Goleš	6–2, 6–2
Loss	6.	Dec 1985	Tokyo Indoor, Japan	Carpet (i)	(Australia) Elizabeth Smylie	(West Germany) Claudia Kohde-Kilsch (Czechoslovakia) Helena Suková	0–6, 4–6
Win	6.	Mar 1986	Oklahoma City, U.S.	Carpet (i)	(France) Pascale Paradis	(United States) Lori McNeil (France) Catherine Suire	2–6, 7–6, 6–1
Loss	7.	May 1987	Strasbourg, France	Clay	(United States) Kathy Horvath	(Czechoslovakia) Jana Novotná (France) Catherine Suire	0–6, 2–6
Loss	8.	Jul 1987	Belgian Open	Clay	(United States) Kathy Horvath	(West Germany) Bettina Bunge (Bulgaria) Manuela Maleeva	6–4, 4–6, 4–6
