= Candy Reynolds =

American tennis player

- Country (sports): United States
- Born: March 24, 1955 (age 71) Knoxville, Tennessee, U.S.
- Height: 5 ft 8 in (1.73 m)
- Plays: Right-handed
- Prize money: US$ 627,800

Singles
- Career record: 79–125
- Career titles: 0
- Highest ranking: No. 50 (May 23, 1983)

Grand Slam singles results
- Australian Open: QF (1980)
- French Open: 4R (1981)
- Wimbledon: 4R (1982)
- US Open: 4R (1980)

Doubles
- Career record: 396–187
- Career titles: 26
- Highest ranking: No. 24 (December 21, 1986)

Grand Slam doubles results
- Australian Open: F (1980)
- French Open: W (1983)
- Wimbledon: SF (1980)
- US Open: F (1983)

Grand Slam mixed doubles results
- Australian Open: 1R (1988)
- French Open: QF (1982)
- Wimbledon: 2R (1984, 1986, 1989)
- US Open: SF (1980, 1982)

Candy Reynolds (born March 24, 1955) is a former professional tennis player from the United States.

== Career ==
During her career, Reynolds won the women's doubles title at the French Open in 1983 (with Rosalyn Fairbank). She was also a runner-up at the Australian Open in 1980 (with Ann Kiyomura) and at the French Open in 1981 (with Paula Smith).

Reynolds' career-high rankings were world No. 50 in singles in May 1983 and No. 24 in doubles in December 1986. Her best singles performance at a Grand Slam event came at the Australian Open in 1980 when she reached the quarterfinals. She won 26 doubles titles during her career from 1980 to 1988.

== WTA career finals ==
=== Doubles: 49 (26–23) ===
Legend
Grand Slam	1
WTA Championships	0
Tier I	0
Tier II	0
Tier III	1
Tier IV & V	0

Titles by surface
Hard	11
Clay	6
Grass	1
Carpet	8

Result	No.	Date	Tournament	Surface	Partner	Opponents	Score
Loss	1.	Apr 1980	Hilton Head, U.S.	Clay	(United States) Paula Smith	(United States) Kathy Jordan (United States) Anne Smith	2–6, 1–6
Win	1.	Aug 1980	Mahwah, U.S.	Hard	(United States) Martina Navratilova	(United States) Pam Shriver (Netherlands) Betty Stöve	4–6, 6–3, 6–1
Win	2.	Oct 1980	U.S. Indoors	Carpet (i)	(United States) Ann Kiyomura	(United States) Paula Smith (United States) Anne Smith	6–3, 4–6, 6–1
Loss	2.	Oct 1980	Phoenix, U.S.	Hard	(United States) Ann Kiyomura	(United States) Pam Shriver (United States) Paula Smith	0–6, 4–6
Loss	3.	Oct 1980	Deerfield Beach, U.S.	Hard	(United States) Martina Navratilova	(United States) Andrea Jaeger (Czechoslovakia) Regina Maršíková	6–1, 1–6, 2–6
Win	3.	Nov 1980	Tampa, U.S.	Hard	(United States) Rosie Casals	(United States) Paula Smith (United States) Anne Smith	7–6, 7–5
Loss	4.	Nov 1980	Australian Open	Grass	(United States) Ann Kiyomura	(United States) Betsy Nagelsen (United States) Martina Navratilova	4–6, 4–6
Loss	5.	Dec 1980	Landover, U.S.	Carpet (i)	(United States) Paula Smith	(United States) Rosie Casals (Australia) Wendy Turnbull	3–6, 6–4, 6–7
Win	4.	May 1981	Perugia, Italy	Clay	(United States) Paula Smith	(United States) Chris Evert-Lloyd (Romania) Virginia Ruzici	7–5, 6–1
Loss	6.	May 1981	Lugano, Switzerland	Clay	(United States) Paula Smith	(South Africa) Rosalyn Fairbank (South Africa) Tanya Harford	6–2, 1–6, 4–6
Loss	7.	Jun 1981	French Open	Clay	(United States) Paula Smith	(South Africa) Rosalyn Fairbank (South Africa) Tanya Harford	1–6, 3–6
Win	5.	Aug 1981	San Diego, U.S.	Hard	(United States) Kathy Jordan	(United States) Rosie Casals (United States) Pam Shriver	6–1, 2–6, 6–4
Loss	8.	Aug 1981	Canadian Open	Hard	(United States) Anne Smith	(United States) Martina Navratilova (United States) Pam Shriver	6–7, 6–7
Loss	9.	Aug 1981	Mahwah, U.S.	Hard	(Netherlands) Betty Stöve	(United States) Rosie Casals (Australia) Wendy Turnbull	2–6, 1–6
Loss	10.	Sep 1981	Atlanta, U.S.	Hard	(United States) Rosie Casals	(United States) Laura duPont (United States) Betsy Nagelsen	4–6, 5–7
Loss	11.	Nov 1981	Perth, Australia	Grass	(United States) Betsy Nagelsen	(United States) Barbara Potter (United States) Sharon Walsh	4–6, 2–6
Win	6.	May 1982	Lugano, Switzerland	Clay	(United States) Paula Smith	(United States) JoAnne Russell (Romania) Virginia Ruzici	6–2, 6–4
Win	7.	Aug 1982	Canadian Open	Hard	(United States) Martina Navratilova	(United States) Barbara Potter (United States) Sharon Walsh	6–4, 6–4
Loss	12.	Oct 1982	Filderstadt, West Germany	Carpet (i)	(United States) Anne Smith	(United States) Martina Navratilova (United States) Pam Shriver	2–6, 3–6
Win	8.	Dec 1982	Richmond, U.S.	Carpet (i)	(United States) Rosie Casals	(United States) JoAnne Russell (Romania) Virginia Ruzici	6–3, 6–4
Loss	13.	Dec 1982	East Rutherford, U.S.	Hard (i)	(United States) Paula Smith	(United States) Martina Navratilova (United States) Pam Shriver	4–6, 5–7
Loss	14.	Feb 1983	Indianapolis, U.S.	Hard (i)	(South Africa) Rosalyn Fairbank	(United States) Lea Antonoplis (United States) Kathy Jordan	7–5, 4–6, 5–7
Win	9.	Mar 1983	Nashville, U.S.	Hard	(South Africa) Rosalyn Fairbank	(United States) Alycia Moulton (United States) Paula Smith	6–4, 7–6
Win	10.	Mar 1983	Pittsburgh, U.S.	Carpet (i)	(United States) Paula Smith	(Poland) Iwona Kuczyńska (United States) Trey Lewis	6–2, 6–2
Win	11.	Apr 1983	Hilton Head, U.S.	Clay	(United States) Martina Navratilova	(United States) Andrea Jaeger (United States) Paula Smith	6–2, 6–3
Win	12.	Apr 1983	Amelia Island, U.S.	Clay	(South Africa) Rosalyn Fairbank	(Czechoslovakia) Hana Mandlíková (Romania) Virginia Ruzici	6–4, 6–2
Win	13.	Jun 1983	French Open	Clay	(South Africa) Rosalyn Fairbank	(United States) Kathy Jordan (United States) Anne Smith	5–7, 7–5, 6–2
Loss	15.	Aug 1983	Canadian Open	Hard	(South Africa) Rosalyn Fairbank	(United Kingdom) Anne Hobbs (United States) Andrea Jaeger	4–6, 7–5, 5–7
Loss	16.	Aug 1983	Mahwah, U.S.	Hard	(South Africa) Rosalyn Fairbank	(United Kingdom) Jo Durie (United States) Sharon Walsh	6–4, 5–7, 3–6
Loss	17.	Sep 1983	US Open	Hard	(South Africa) Rosalyn Fairbank	(United States) Martina Navratilova (United States) Pam Shriver	7–6, 1–6, 3–6
Win	14.	Sep 1983	Richmond, U.S.	Carpet (i)	(South Africa) Rosalyn Fairbank	(United States) Kathy Jordan (United States) Barbara Potter	6–7, 6–2, 6–1
Win	15.	Oct 1983	Filderstadt, West Germany	Carpet (i)	(United States) Martina Navratilova	(Romania) Virginia Ruzici (France) Catherine Tanvier	6–2, 6–1
Win	16.	Nov 1983	Ginny Championships, U.S.	Carpet (i)	(South Africa) Rosalyn Fairbank	(United States) Lea Antonoplis (United States) Kathy Jordan	5–7, 7–5, 6–3
Win	17.	Jan 1984	Nashville, U.S.	Hard (i)	(United States) Sherry Acker	(United States) Mary-Lou Daniels (United States) Paula Smith	5–7, 7–6, 7–6
Loss	18.	Jan 1984	Denver, U.S.	Hard (i)	(United States) Sherry Acker	(United Kingdom) Anne Hobbs (Netherlands) Marcella Mesker	2–6, 3–6
Loss	19.	Mar 1984	Palm Beach, U.S.	Clay	(South Africa) Rosalyn Fairbank	(United States) Betsy Nagelsen (United States) Anne White	2–6, 2–6, 2–6
Win	18.	May 1984	German Open, West Germany	Clay	(United Kingdom) Anne Hobbs	(United States) Kathy Horvath (Romania) Virginia Ruzici	6–3, 4–6, 7–6
Win	19.	Oct 1984	Tokyo, Japan	Hard	(United States) Betsy Nagelsen	(Argentina) Emilse Longo (Argentina) Adriana Villagrán	6–3, 6–2
Loss	20.	Feb 1985	Oakland, U.S.	Carpet (i)	(South Africa) Rosalyn Fairbank	(Czechoslovakia) Hana Mandlíková (Australia) Wendy Turnbull	6–4, 5–7, 1–6
Win	20.	Apr 1985	San Diego, U.S.	Hard	(Australia) Wendy Turnbull	(South Africa) Rosalyn Fairbank (Australia) Susan Leo	6–4, 6–0
Loss	21.	Nov 1985	Sydney, Australia	Grass	(South Africa) Rosalyn Fairbank	(Czechoslovakia) Hana Mandlíková (Australia) Wendy Turnbull	6–3, 6–7, 4–6
Win	21.	Dec 1985	Auckland, New Zealand	Grass	(United Kingdom) Anne Hobbs	(United States) Lea Antonoplis (Argentina) Adriana Villagrán	6–1, 6–3
Win	22.	Jan 1986	Wichita, U.S.	Carpet (i)	(United States) Kathy Jordan	(United States) JoAnne Russell (United States) Anne Smith	6–3, 6–7, 6–3
Win	23.	Mar 1986	Hershey, U.S.	Hard	(United States) Anne Smith	(United States) Sandy Collins (United States) Kim Sands	7–6, 6–1
Win	24.	Oct 1986	New Orleans, U.S.	Carpet (i)	(United States) Anne Smith	(Soviet Union) Svetlana Parkhomenko (Soviet Union) Larisa Savchenko	6–3, 3–6, 6–3
Loss	22.	Nov 1986	Indianapolis, U.S.	Hard (i)	(United States) Anne Smith	(United States) Zina Garrison (United States) Lori McNeil	5–4 ret.
Loss	23.	Apr 1987	Charleston, U.S.	Clay	(Argentina) Mercedes Paz	(Peru) Laura Gildemeister (Denmark) Tine Scheuer	4–6, 4–6
Win	25.	Aug 1988	Cincinnati, U.S.	Hard	(United States) Beth Herr	(United States) Lindsay Bartlett (Canada) Helen Kelesi	4–6, 7–6, 6–1
Win	26.	Oct 1988	New Orleans, U.S.	Hard	(United States) Beth Herr	(United States) Lori McNeil (United States) Betsy Nagelsen	6–4, 6–4
