= Cláudia Monteiro =

Brazilian tennis player

- Country (sports): Brazil
- Residence: Santa Fe, New Mexico, U.S.
- Born: 8 May 1961 (age 64) São Paulo, Brazil
- Plays: Right-handed
- Prize money: $198,638

Singles
- Career record: 35–53
- Career titles: 0
- Highest ranking: No. 72 (31 Jan 1983)

Grand Slam singles results
- Australian Open: 1R (1982, 1983, 1987)
- French Open: 2R (1981, 1982)
- Wimbledon: 2R (1984)
- US Open: 2R (1983)

Doubles
- Career record: 40–58
- Career titles: 1
- Highest ranking: No. 82 (28 Sep 1987)

Grand Slam doubles results
- Australian Open: 2R (1982, 1983)
- French Open: 3R (1987)
- Wimbledon: QF (1982)
- US Open: 2R (1983, 1987)

Grand Slam mixed doubles results
- French Open: F (1982)
- Wimbledon: 3R (1982, 1985)
- US Open: 1R

Cláudia Monteiro (born 8 May 1961) is a Brazilian former professional tennis player.

Monteiro played in the mixed doubles final of the French Open with Cássio Motta in 1982. She holds a career singles record of 41 wins and 82 defeats, and a doubles record of 112 wins and 131 defeats After retiring in 1987, at the age of 26, she moved to Santa Fe, New Mexico, acting as a past life therapist and then a tennis coach.

== Grand Slam finals ==
=== Mixed doubles (1 runner-up) ===
| Result | Year | Championship | Surface | Partner | Opponents | Score |
|---|---|---|---|---|---|---|
| Loss | 1982 | French Open | Clay | (Brazil) Cássio Motta | (United Kingdom) John Lloyd (Australia) Wendy Turnbull | 6–2, 7–6^{(10–8)} |
