= 1984 Virginia Slims of Nashville – Doubles =

Doubles
- 1984 Virginia Slims of Nashville

Final
- Champions: (United States) Sherry Acker (United States) Candy Reynolds
- Runners-up: (United States) Mary Lou Piatek (United States) Paula Smith
- Score: 5–7, 7–6, 7–6

Details
- Draw: 16 (2Q)
- Seeds: 4

Events
Singles	Doubles
← 1983 ·	Virginia Slims of Nashville	· 1988 →

Rosalyn Fairbank and Candy Reynolds were the defending champions, but Fairbank did not compete this year.

Reynolds teamed up with Sherry Acker and successfully defended her title by defeating Mary Lou Piatek and Paula Smith 5–7, 7–6, 7–6 in the final.

== Seeds ==
1. (United States) Sherry Acker / (United States) Candy Reynolds (champions)
2. (United States) Mary Lou Piatek / (United States) Paula Smith (final)
3. (United States) Amy Holton / (United States) Kathy Holton (first round)
4. (Australia) Anne Minter / (France) Corinne Vanier (first round)

== Draw ==
Key

- Q = Qualifier
- WC = Wild card
- LL = Lucky loser
- Alt = Alternate
- ITF = ITF entry
- PR = Protected ranking
- SR = Special ranking
- SE = Special exempt
- JE = Junior exempt
- JR = Junior Accelerator Programme entrant
- CO = College Accelerator Programme entrant
- NG = Next Gen Accelerator Program entrant
- w/o = Walkover
- r = Retired
- d = Defaulted

=== Draw ===
First round
1	(United States) S Acker (United States) C Reynolds	7	6
(United Kingdom) A Brown (United States) J Newberry	5	2
(Czechoslovakia) K Skronská (Czechoslovakia) M Skuherská	6	4	6
(United Kingdom) A Croft (Socialist Federal Republic of Yugoslavia) S Goleš	4	6	1
3	(United States) A Holton (United States) Kathy Holton	3	3
(United States) K Keil (Romania) L Romanov	6	6
(United States) L Bernstein (Italy) S Simmonds	7	6	6
(United Kingdom) S Gomer (United Kingdom) E Jones	6	7	0
Q	(United States) K Cummings (United States) R White	6	6
Q	(United Kingdom) G Coles (United States) K Latham	3	4
(United States) S Margolin (United States) F Raschiatore	6	6
4	(Australia) A Minter (France) C Vanier	4	2
(United States) A Henricksson (United States) N Yeargin	6	6
(United States) J Klitch (Argentina) E Longo	3	2
(United States) T Lewis (United States) T Mochizuki	2	0
2	(United States) ML Piatek (United States) P Smith	6	6

Quarterfinals
1	(United States) S Acker (United States) C Reynolds	6	6
(Czechoslovakia) K Skronská (Czechoslovakia) M Skuherská	4	3
(United States) K Keil (Romania) L Romanov	6	6
(United States) L Bernstein (Italy) S Simmonds	3	2
Q	(United States) K Cummings (United States) R White	7	6
(United States) S Margolin (United States) F Raschiatore	5	0
(United States) A Henricksson (United States) N Yeargin	6	2
2	(United States) ML Piatek (United States) P Smith	7	6

Semifinals
1	(United States) S Acker (United States) C Reynolds	6	6
(United States) K Keil (Romania) L Romanov	1	0
Q	(United States) K Cummings (United States) R White	4	6
2	(United States) ML Piatek (United States) P Smith	6	7

Final
1	(United States) S Acker (United States) C Reynolds	5	7	7
2	(United States) ML Piatek (United States) P Smith	7	6	6
