= 1984 Virginia Slims of California – Singles =

Singles
- 1984 Virginia Slims of California

Final
- Champion: (Czechoslovakia) Hana Mandlíková
- Runner-up: (United States) Martina Navratilova
- Score: 7–6^{(8–6)}, 3–6, 6–4

Details
- Draw: 32
- Seeds: 8

Events
Singles	Doubles
- Silicon Valley Classic

Bettina Bunge was the defending champion, but lost in the quarterfinals to Pam Shriver.

Hana Mandlíková won the title by defeating Martina Navratilova 7–6^{(8–6)}, 3–6, 6–4 in the final. The result ended Navratilova's 54-match streak in singles, which made her win nine consecutive titles at Eastbourne, Wimbledon, Los Angeles, Toronto, the US Open, Tampa, Stuttgart, Tokyo and the Australian Open.

== Seeds ==
1. (United States) Martina Navratilova (final)
2. (United States) Andrea Jaeger (quarterfinals)
3. (United States) Pam Shriver (semifinals)
4. (West Germany) Sylvia Hanika (first round, retired)
5. (West Germany) Bettina Bunge (quarterfinals)
6. (Australia) Wendy Turnbull (first round)
7. (United States) Zina Garrison (quarterfinals)
8. (Czechoslovakia) Hana Mandlíková (champion)

== Draw ==
Key

- Q = Qualifier
- WC = Wild card
- LL = Lucky loser
- Alt = Alternate
- ITF = ITF entry
- PR = Protected ranking
- SR = Special ranking
- SE = Special exempt
- JE = Junior exempt
- JR = Junior Accelerator Programme entrant
- CO = College Accelerator Programme entrant
- NG = Next Gen Accelerator Program entrant
- w/o = Walkover
- r = Retired
- d = Defaulted

=== Finals ===
Semifinals
1	(United States) Martina Navratilova	6	6
(Czechoslovakia) Helena Suková	2	1
3	(United States) Pam Shriver	2	3
8	(Czechoslovakia) Hana Mandlíková	6	6

Final
1	(United States) Martina Navratilova	6^{6}	6	4
8	(Czechoslovakia) Hana Mandlíková	7^{8}	3	6

=== Top half ===
First round
1	(United States) M Navratilova	6	6
(United States) K Horvath	2	0
(United States) W White	0	4
(United States) P Casale	6	6
(United States) J Klitch	6	6	4
(United States) A White	7	2	6
(Switzerland) C Jolissaint	0	1
7	(United States) Z Garrison	6	6
4	(West Germany) S Hanika	5	r
(United States) A Smith	7
(South Africa) Y Vermaak	6	0	1
(West Germany) E Pfaff	4	6	6
(Czechoslovakia) H Suková	6	3	6
(United States) J Russell	2	6	3
(United States) S Walsh	6	1	6
6	(Australia) W Turnbull	3	6	2

Second round
1	(United States) M Navratilova	6	6
(United States) P Casale	1	3
(United States) A White	6	1
7	(United States) Z Garrison	7	6
(United States) A Smith	2	6
(West Germany) E Pfaff	6	7
(Czechoslovakia) H Suková	4	6	6
(United States) S Walsh	6	1	1

Quarterfinals
1	(United States) M Navratilova	6	6
7	(United States) Z Garrison	1	1
(West Germany) E Pfaff	3	4
(Czechoslovakia) H Suková	6	6

Semifinals
1	(United States) M Navratilova	6	6
(Czechoslovakia) H Suková	2	1

=== Bottom half ===
First round
5	(West Germany) B Bunge	6	6
(United States) E Burgin	2	1
(United States) L Bonder	7	7
(Romania) V Ruzici	5	6
(Bulgaria) M Maleeva	7	6
(United States) K Shaefer	6	2
(Italy) S Cecchini	1	2
3	(United States) P Shriver	6	6
8	(Czechoslovakia) H Mandlíková	6	6
(United States) A Moulton	2	4
(West Germany) C Kohde-Kilsch	5	4
(United States) B Gadusek	7	6
(United States) K Cummings	3	0
(United States) K Rinaldi	6	6
(United States) P Teeguarden	3	3
2	(United States) A Jaeger	6	6

Second round
5	(West Germany) B Bunge	6	7
(United States) L Bonder	2	6
(Bulgaria) M Maleeva	3	2
3	(United States) P Shriver	6	6
8	(Czechoslovakia) H Mandlíková	6	6	6
(United States) B Gadusek	1	7	2
(United States) K Rinaldi	3	3
2	(United States) A Jaeger	6	6

Quarterfinals
5	(West Germany) B Bunge	3	2
3	(United States) P Shriver	6	6
8	(Czechoslovakia) H Mandlíková	7	6
2	(United States) A Jaeger	6	4

Semifinals
3	(United States) P Shriver	2	3
8	(Czechoslovakia) H Mandlíková	6	6
