= 1983 Edgbaston Cup – Doubles =

Doubles
- 1983 Edgbaston Cup
- 1982 Champions: (United Kingdom) Jo Durie (United Kingdom) Anne Hobbs

Final
- Champions: (United States) Billie Jean King (United States) Sharon Walsh
- Runners-up: (South Africa) Beverly Mould (Australia) Elizabeth Sayers
- Score: 6–2, 6–3

Events
Singles	Doubles
← 1982 ·	Birmingham Classic	· 1984 →

Jo Durie and Anne Hobbs of Great Britain were the defending champions, but neither player returned to compete in the doubles in the 1983 tournament.

Billie Jean King and Sharon Walsh won in the final 6–2, 6–4 against Beverly Mould and Elizabeth Sayers.

== Seeds ==
Champion seeds are indicated in bold text while text in italics indicates the round in which those seeds were eliminated.

1. (United States) Rosie Casals / (Czechoslovakia) Hana Mandlíková (first round)
2. (United States) Ann Kiyomura / (United States) Paula Smith (first round)
3. (United States) **Billie Jean King / (United States) Sharon Walsh (champions)**
4. (United States) Lea Antonoplis / (United States) Barbara Jordan (first round)
5. (United States) Kathy Jordan / (United States) Betsy Nagelsen (second round)
6. (Australia) Evonne Cawley / (South Africa) Rosalyn Fairbank (semifinals)
7. (United Kingdom) Sue Barker / (United States) Wendy White (first round)
8. (South Africa) Beverly Mould / (Australia) Elizabeth Sayers (final)

== Draw ==
=== Key ===
- Q = Qualifier
- WC = Wild card
- LL = Lucky loser
- Alt = Alternate
- SE = Special exempt
- PR = Protected ranking
- ITF = ITF entry
- JE = Junior exempt
- w/o = Walkover
- r = Retired
- d = Defaulted
- SR = Special ranking

=== Finals ===
Semifinals
6	(Australia) Evonne Cawley (South Africa) Rosalyn Fairbank	**7**	6	5
3	(United States) **Billie Jean King** **(United States) Sharon Walsh**	5	**7**	**7**
8	(South Africa) **Beverly Mould** **(Australia) Elizabeth Sayers**	**6**	**6**
(United States) Elise Burgin (United States) Alycia Moulton	3	4

Final
3	(United States) **Billie Jean King** **(United States) Sharon Walsh**	**6**	**6**
8	(South Africa) Beverly Mould (Australia) Elizabeth Sayers	2	4

=== Top half ===
First round
1	(United States) R Casals (Czechoslovakia) H Mandlíková	6	6
(United States) **K Latham** **(United States) K Steinmetz**	**7**	**7**
(Sweden) C Jexell (United States) S Margolin	2	**6**	8
(United States) **A Leand** **(United States) S Mascarin**	**6**	1	**10**
(Australia) **C O'Neil** **(Australia) P Whytcross**	**6**	3	**6**
(Australia) B Remilton (Japan) N Sato	2	**6**	3
(United States) P Casale (United States) K Sands	6	**6**	4
6	(Australia) **E Cawley** **(South Africa) R Fairbank**	**7**	4	**6**
3	(United States) **B J King** **(United States) S Walsh**	5	**6**	**6**
(United States) S Collins (France) Z Garrison	**7**	4	4
(United States) R Blount (Romania) L Romanov	3	2
(United Kingdom) **D Jarrett** **(Australia) A Tobin**	**6**	**6**
(Australia) T Lewis (United States) S McInerney	6	1
(Australia) **S Leo** **(Italy) S Simmonds**	**7**	**6**
(United States) **C Benjamin** **(France) C Vanier**	**6**	1	**7**
7	(United Kingdom) S Barker (United States) W White	3	**6**	5

Second round
(United States) K Latham (United States) K Steinmetz	2	3
(United States) **A Leand** **(United States) S Mascarin**	**6**	**6**
(Australia) C O'Neil (Australia) P Whytcross	4	**7**	4
6	(Australia) **E Cawley** **(South Africa) R Fairbank**	**6**	6	**6**
3	(United States) **B J King** **(United States) S Walsh**	**6**	**6**
(United Kingdom) D Jarrett (Australia) A Tobin	2	4
(Australia) **S Leo** **(Italy) S Simmonds**	**7**	2	**6**
(United States) C Benjamin (France) C Vanier	6	**6**	4

Quarterfinals
(United States) A Leand (United States) S Mascarin	6	1
6	(Australia) **E Cawley** **(South Africa) R Fairbank**	**7**	**6**
3	(United States) **B J King** **(United States) S Walsh**	**6**	**6**
(Australia) S Leo (Italy) S Simmonds	2	2

Semifinals
6	(Australia) E Cawley (South Africa) R Fairbank	**7**	6	5
3	(United States) **B J King** **(Romania) S Walsh**	5	**7**	**7**

=== Bottom half ===
First round
8	**(South Africa) B Mould** **(Australia) E Sayers**	**6**	**7**
(South Africa) J Mundel (South Africa) R Uys	1	5
**(United States) J Davis** **(United States) H Ludloff**	**7**	4	**6**
(Argentina) R Giscafré (Brazil) C Monteiro	6	**6**	4
(South Africa) I Kloss (United States) P Teeguarden	4	6
**(Australia) D Fromholtz** **(Netherlands) B Stöve**	**6**	**7**
**(United States) S Acker** **(United States) L Forood**	**6**	**6**
4	(United States) L Antonoplis (United States) B Jordan	3	4
5	**(United States) K Jordan** **(United States) B Nagelsen**	**6**	**6**
(United Kingdom) A Brown (United Kingdom) R Einy	1	0
(United States) A-M Fernandez (United States) B Herr	3	2
**(United States) B Hallquist** **(United States) A White**	**6**	**6**
(Switzerland) C Jolissaint (Netherlands) M Mesker	6	5	5
**(South Africa) Y Vermaak** **(United States) N Yeargin**	3	**7**	**7**
**(United States) E Burgin** **(United States) A Moulton**	**6**	3	**9**
2	(United States) A Kiyomura (United States) P Smith	4	**6**	7

Second round
8	**(South Africa) B Mould** **(Australia) E Sayers**	**6**	**6**
(United States) J Davis (United States) H Ludloff	3	0
(Australia) D Fromholtz (Netherlands) B Stöve	3	6
**(United States) S Acker** **(United States) L Forood**	**6**	**7**
5	(United States) K Jordan (United States) B Nagelsen	**6**	4	2
**(United States) B Hallquist** **(United States) A White**	4	**6**	**6**
(South Africa) Y Vermaak (United States) N Yeargin	6	**7**	5
**(United States) E Burgin** **(United States) A Moulton**	**7**	6	**7**

Quarterfinals
8	**(South Africa) B Mould** **(Australia) E Sayers**	**6**	3	**6**
(United States) S Acker (United States) L Forood	4	**6**	3
(United States) B Hallquist (United States) A White	3	1
**(United States) E Burgin** **(United States) A Moulton**	**6**	**6**

Semifinals
8	**(South Africa) B Mould** **(Australia) E Sayers**	**6**	**6**
(United States) E Burgin (United States) A Moulton	3	4
