= 1984 Virginia Slims of Nashville – Singles =

Singles
- 1984 Virginia Slims of Nashville

Final
- Champion: (United States) Jenny Klitch
- Runner-up: (United States) Pam Teeguarden
- Score: 6–2, 6–1

Details
- Draw: 32 (4Q/1LL)
- Seeds: 8

Events
Singles	Doubles
← 1983 ·	Virginia Slims of Nashville	· 1988 →

Kathleen Horvath was the defending champion, but she chose to compete at Washington, D.C. during the same week.

Jenny Klitch won the title by defeating Pam Teeguarden 6–2, 6–1 in the final.

== Seeds ==
1. (United States) Mary Lou Piatek (second round)
2. (France) Corinne Vanier (first round)
3. (United States) Paula Smith (first round)
4. (United States) Candy Reynolds (first round)
5. (United States) Sherry Acker (first round)
6. (United States) Kate Latham (first round)
7. (France) Marie-Christine Calleja (quarterfinals)
8. (n/a)

== Draw ==
Key

- Q = Qualifier
- WC = Wild card
- LL = Lucky loser
- Alt = Alternate
- ITF = ITF entry
- PR = Protected ranking
- SR = Special ranking
- SE = Special exempt
- JE = Junior exempt
- JR = Junior Accelerator Programme entrant
- CO = College Accelerator Programme entrant
- NG = Next Gen Accelerator Program entrant
- w/o = Walkover
- r = Retired
- d = Defaulted

=== Finals ===
Semifinals
(United States) Jenny Klitch	6	6
(United States) Kathleen Cummings	3	1
(United States) Pam Teeguarden	6	4	6
(Italy) Sandra Cecchini	1	6	3

Final
(United States) Jenny Klitch	6	6
(United States) Pam Teeguarden	2	1

=== Top half ===
First round
1	(United States) ML Piatek	2	7	6
(Socialist Federal Republic of Yugoslavia) S Goleš	6	5	4
(United Kingdom) A Brown	4	3
(France) N Herreman	6	6
Q	(United States) F Raschiatore	6	4	6
(United States) A Henricksson	3	6	3
(United States) J Klitch	7	6
5	(United States) S Acker	5	2
3	(United States) P Smith	6	4	6
(United States) K Cummings	1	6	7
(United States) Edie Carell	2	0
(United States) A Holton	6	6
(Czechoslovakia) M Skuherská	1	0
(United States) V Nelson	6	6
Q	(Romania) L Romanov	6	3	7
6	(United States) K Latham	2	6	5

Second round
1	(United States) ML Piatek	1	2
(France) N Herreman	6	6
Q	(United States) F Raschiatore	3	2
(United States) J Klitch	6	6
(United States) K Cummings	6	6
(United States) A Holton	4	4
(United States) V Nelson	2	3
Q	(Romania) L Romanov	6	6

Quarterfinals
(France) N Herreman	6	4	3
(United States) J Klitch	4	6	6
(United States) K Cummings	3	6	6
Q	(Romania) L Romanov	6	1	2

Semifinals
(United States) J Klitch	6	6
(United States) K Cummings	3	1

=== Bottom half ===
First round
7	(France) MC Calleja	6	6
(Italy) S Simmonds	3	4
Q	(United States) K Keil	6	6
(Czechoslovakia) K Skronská	3	0
(United States) B Gerken	6	6	5
(United States) P Teeguarden	4	7	7
(United States) N Yeargin	0	7	6
4	(United States) C Reynolds	6	5	3
(Australia) A Minter	2	3
LL	(United Kingdom) R Einy	6	6
(United States) B Bowes	5	6	2
Q	(United States) T Lewis	7	2	6
(Italy) S Cecchini	5	6	6
(United States) J Hepner	7	0	1
(Argentina) E Longo	6	6	6
2	(France) C Vanier	7	4	2

Second round
7	(France) MC Calleja	7	7
Q	(United States) K Keil	6	6
(United States) P Teeguarden	2	7	6
(United States) N Yeargin	6	5	4
LL	(United Kingdom) R Einy	7	1	2
Q	(United States) T Lewis	6	6	6
(Italy) S Cecchini	6	6	6
(Argentina) E Longo	7	4	2

Quarterfinals
7	(France) MC Calleja	2	7	4
(United States) P Teeguarden	6	5	6
Q	(United States) T Lewis	6	4	2
(Italy) S Cecchini	3	6	6

Semifinals
(United States) P Teeguarden	6	4	6
(Italy) S Cecchini	1	6	3
