= 1983 Ridgewood Open – Doubles =

Doubles
- 1983 Ridgewood Open

Final
- Champions: (South Africa) Beverly Mould (Australia) Elizabeth Sayers
- Runners-up: (South Africa) Rosalyn Fairbank (Australia) Susan Leo
- Score: 7–6, 4–6, 7–5

Events
Singles	Doubles
Ridgewood Open

Beverly Mould and Elizabeth Sayers won in the final 7–6, 4–6, 7–5 against Rosalyn Fairbank and Susan Leo.

== Seeds ==
Champion seeds are indicated in bold text while text in italics indicates the round in which those seeds were eliminated.

1. (Brazil) Patricia Medrado / (Brazil) Cláudia Monteiro (first round)
2. (United States) Lea Antonoplis / (United States) Alycia Moulton (first round)
3. (South Africa) Rosalyn Fairbank / (Australia) Susan Leo (final)
4. (France) Sophie Amiach / (France) Corinne Vanier (quarterfinals)

== Draw ==
=== Key ===
- Q = Qualifier
- WC = Wild card
- LL = Lucky loser
- Alt = Alternate
- SE = Special exempt
- PR = Protected ranking
- ITF = ITF entry
- JE = Junior exempt
- w/o = Walkover
- r = Retired
- d = Defaulted
- SR = Special ranking

First round
1	(Brazil) P Medrado (Brazil) C Monteiro	**6**	3	3
(United States) **S Margolin** (United States) **K Jones-Shaefer**	3	**6**	**6**
(United States) **A-M Fernandez** (United States) **B Hallquist**	**7**	**6**
(Switzerland) P Delhees (Czechoslovakia) M Skuherská	6	3
4	(France) **S Amiach** (France) **C Vanier**	**7**	3	**6**
(United States) S Acker (United States) L Forood	5	**6**	3
(South Africa) **B Mould** (Australia) **E Sayers**	**7**	**6**
(Australia) B Remilton (Australia) A Tobin	6	4
(Peru) **L Arraya** (United States) **K Steinmetz**	**6**	**6**
(United States) R Blount (United States) K Sands	4	3
(United States) A Henricksson (United States) K Latham	5	1
3	(South Africa) **R Fairbank** (Australia) **S Leo**	**7**	**6**
(United States) B Buckley (United States) B Bruning	0	**7**	6
(Australia) **C O'Neil** (Australia) **P Whytcross**	**6**	5	**7**
(Switzerland) **C Jolissaint** (Netherlands) **M Mesker**	3	**6**	**7**
2	(United States) L Antonoplis (United States) A Moulton	**6**	2	6

Quarterfinals
(United States) **S Margolin** (United States) **K Jones-Shaefer**	**7**	**7**
(United States) A-M Fernandez (United States) B Hallquist	6	5
4	(France) S Amiach (France) C Vanier	**6**	3	4
(South Africa) **B Mould** (Australia) **E Sayers**	2	**6**	**6**
(Peru) L Arraya (United States) K Steinmetz	4	5
3	(South Africa) **R Fairbank** (Australia) **S Leo**	**6**	**7**
(Australia) **C O'Neil** (Australia) **P Whytcross**	**6**	**7**
(Switzerland) C Jolissaint (Netherlands) M Mesker	3	6

Semifinals
(United States) S Margolin (United States) K Jones-Shaefer	0	4
(South Africa) **B Mould** (Australia) **E Sayers**	**6**	**6**
3	(South Africa) **R Fairbank** (Australia) **S Leo**	**7**	**6**
(Australia) C O'Neil (Australia) P Whytcross	5	2

Final
(South Africa) **Beverly Mould** (Australia) **Elizabeth Sayers**	**7**	4	**7**
3	(South Africa) Rosalyn Fairbank (Australia) Susan Leo	6	**6**	5
