= 1983 Virginia Slims of Nashville – Doubles =

Doubles
- 1983 Virginia Slims of Nashville

Final
- Champions: (South Africa) Rosalyn Fairbank (United States) Candy Reynolds
- Runners-up: (United States) Alycia Moulton (United States) Paula Smith
- Score: 6–4, 7–6

Events
Singles	Doubles
← 1982 ·	Virginia Slims of Nashville	· 1984 →

Rosalyn Fairbank and Candy Reynolds won in the final 6–4, 7–6 against Alycia Moulton and Paula Smith.

== Seeds ==
Champion seeds are indicated in bold text while text in italics indicates the round in which those seeds were eliminated.

1. (South Africa) **Rosalyn Fairbank** / (United States) **Candy Reynolds (champions)**
2. (United States) Alycia Moulton / (United States) Paula Smith (final)
3. (Czechoslovakia) Iva Budařová / (Czechoslovakia) Marcela Skuherská (quarterfinals)
4. (Australia) Chris O'Neil / (Australia) Pam Whytcross (semifinals)

== Draw ==
=== Key ===
- Q = Qualifier
- WC = Wild card
- LL = Lucky loser
- Alt = Alternate
- SE = Special exempt
- PR = Protected ranking
- ITF = ITF entry
- JE = Junior exempt
- w/o = Walkover
- r = Retired
- d = Defaulted
- SR = Special ranking

First round
1	(South Africa) **R Fairbank** (United States) **C Reynolds**	**6**	**6**
(United States) R Blount (United States) A Henricksson	0	1
(Chile) **G Ohaco** (France) **C Suire**	**6**	6	**7**
(United States) K Latham (United States) S Margolin	1	**7**	6
4	(Australia) **C O'Neil** (Australia) **P Whytcross**	**6**	6	**7**
(Poland) I Kuczyńska (United States) T Lewis	1	**7**	6
(United States) J Davis (United States) J Preyer	2	2
(United States) **S Acker** (United States) **L Forood**	**6**	**6**
(Australia) B Remilton (Australia) A Tobin	4	0
(United States) **K Sands** (United States) **N Yeargin**	**6**	**6**
(United States) F Raschiatore (United States) K Steinmetz	4	3
3	(Czechoslovakia) **I Budařová** (Czechoslovakia) **M Skuherská**	**6**	**6**
(United States) **B Norton** (Australia) **E Sayers**	**7**	**6**
(South Africa) J Mundel (South Africa) S Rollinson	6	2
(United States) J Klitch (United States) V Nelson	0	0
2	(United States) **A Moulton** (United States) **P Smith**	**6**	**6**

Quarterfinals
1	(South Africa) **R Fairbank** (United States) **C Reynolds**	**6**	**6**
(Chile) G Ohaco (France) C Suire	0	1
4	(Australia) **C O'Neil** (Australia) **P Whytcross**	**6**	**6**
(United States) S Acker (United States) L Forood	2	1
(United States) **K Sands** (United States) **N Yeargin**	**w/o**
3	(Czechoslovakia) I Budařová (Czechoslovakia) M Skuherská
(United States) B Norton (Australia) E Sayers	2	6
2	(United States) **A Moulton** (United States) **P Smith**	**6**	**7**

Semifinals
1	(South Africa) **R Fairbank** (United States) **C Reynolds**	**7**	**6**
4	(Australia) C O'Neil (Australia) P Whytcross	6	2
(United States) K Sands (United States) N Yeargin	4	2
2	(United States) **A Moulton** (United States) **P Smith**	**6**	**6**

Final
1	(South Africa) **Rosalyn Fairbank** (United States) **Candy Reynolds**	**6**	**7**
2	(United States) Alycia Moulton (United States) Paula Smith	4	6
