= 1983 BMW Championships – Doubles =

Doubles
- 1983 BMW Championships

Final
- Champions: (United States) Martina Navratilova (United States) Pam Shriver
- Runners-up: (United Kingdom) Jo Durie (United Kingdom) Anne Hobbs
- Score: 6–1, 6–0

Details
- Draw: 32
- Seeds: 8

Events
Singles	Doubles
- Eastbourne International

Martina Navratilova and Pam Shriver won their third consecutive title at Eastbourne by defeating Jo Durie and Anne Hobbs 6–1, 6–0 in the final.

== Seeds ==
1. (United States) Martina Navratilova / (United States) Pam Shriver (champions)
2. (South Africa) Rosalyn Fairbank / (United States) Candy Reynolds (semifinals)
3. (United Kingdom) Jo Durie / (United Kingdom) Anne Hobbs (final)
4. (West Germany) Claudia Kohde / (West Germany) Eva Pfaff (quarterfinals)
5. (United States) Rosie Casals / (Australia) Wendy Turnbull (quarterfinals)
6. (United States) Barbara Potter / (United States) Sharon Walsh (quarterfinals)
7. (Socialist Federal Republic of Yugoslavia) Mima Jaušovec / (United States) Kathy Jordan (semifinals)
8. (United States) Ann Kiyomura / (United States) Paula Smith (quarterfinals)

== Draw ==
Key

- Q = Qualifier
- WC = Wild card
- LL = Lucky loser
- Alt = Alternate
- ITF = ITF entry
- PR = Protected ranking
- SR = Special ranking
- SE = Special exempt
- JE = Junior exempt
- JR = Junior Accelerator Programme entrant
- CO = College Accelerator Programme entrant
- NG = Next Gen Accelerator Program entrant
- w/o = Walkover
- r = Retired
- d = Defaulted

=== Finals ===
Semifinals
1	(United States) Martina Navratilova (United States) Pam Shriver	6	4	6
7	(Socialist Federal Republic of Yugoslavia) Mima Jaušovec (United States) Kathy Jordan	4	6	3
3	(United Kingdom) Jo Durie (United Kingdom) Anne Hobbs	6	7
2	(South Africa) Rosalyn Fairbank (United States) Candy Reynolds	3	5

Final
1	(United States) Martina Navratilova (United States) Pam Shriver	6	6
3	(United Kingdom) Jo Durie (United Kingdom) Anne Hobbs	1	0

=== Top half ===
First round
1	(United States) M Navratilova (United States) P Shriver	6	6
(South Africa) B Mould (Australia) E Sayers	2	2
(United States) A Leand (United States) ML Piatek	3	2
(Switzerland) C Jolissaint (Netherlands) M Mesker	6	6
(United States) S Acker (United States) L Forood	6	4	6
(France) C Tanvier (Hungary) A Temesvári	3	6	1
(South Africa) I Kloss (United States) P Teeguarden	2	3
6	(United States) B Potter (United States) S Walsh	6	6
4	(West Germany) C Kohde (West Germany) E Pfaff	7	6
(United States) S Mascarin (United States) K Rinaldi	5	0
(Australia) D Fromholtz (Netherlands) B Stöve	6	6
(United States) L Bonder (United States) K Shaefer	3	4
(United Kingdom) S Barker (United States) W White	6	2	6
(United States) A Jaeger (Czechoslovakia) H Mandlíková	1	6	8
(Australia) C O'Neil (Australia) P Whytcross	3	0
7	(Socialist Federal Republic of Yugoslavia) M Jaušovec (United States) K Jordan	6	6

Second round
1	(United States) M Navratilova (United States) P Shriver	6	6
(Switzerland) C Jolissaint (Netherlands) M Mesker	1	2
(United States) S Acker (United States) L Forood	2	4
6	(United States) B Potter (United States) S Walsh	6	6
4	(West Germany) C Kohde (West Germany) E Pfaff	6	4	6
(Australia) D Fromholtz (Netherlands) B Stöve	4	6	1
(United States) A Jaeger (Czechoslovakia) H Mandlíková
7	(Socialist Federal Republic of Yugoslavia) M Jaušovec (United States) K Jordan	w/o

Quarterfinals
1	(United States) M Navratilova (United States) P Shriver	6	6
6	(United States) B Potter (United States) S Walsh	4	2
4	(West Germany) C Kohde (West Germany) E Pfaff	6	2	4
7	(Socialist Federal Republic of Yugoslavia) M Jaušovec (United States) K Jordan	2	6	6

Semifinals
1	(United States) M Navratilova (United States) P Shriver	6	4	6
7	(Socialist Federal Republic of Yugoslavia) M Jaušovec (United States) K Jordan	4	6	3

=== Bottom half ===
First round
8	(United States) A Kiyomura (United States) P Smith	7^{8}	5	6
(United States) E Burgin (United States) A Moulton	6^{6}	7	1
(Australia) S Leo (Italy) S Simmonds	6^{2}	6^{3}
(Canada) C Bassett (United States) Z Garrison	7^{7}	7^{7}
(United States) L Antonoplis (United States) B Jordan	1	6	7
(United States) R Blount (West Germany) B Bunge	6	4	5
(United States) S Collins (Czechoslovakia) K Skronská	4	7^{7}	3
3	(United Kingdom) J Durie (United Kingdom) A Hobbs	6	6^{3}	6
5	(United States) R Casals (Australia) W Turnbull	6	6
(South Africa) Y Vermaak (United States) N Yeargin	3	0
(Brazil) P Medrado (Brazil) C Monteiro	3	0
(United States) AM Fernandez (United States) B Herr	6	6
(South Korea) D-h Lee (Romania) L Romanov	4	2
(United States) J Davis (United States) H Ludloff	6	6
(United States) B Nagelsen (United Kingdom) V Wade	1	1
2	(South Africa) R Fairbank (United States) C Reynolds	6	6

Second round
8	(United States) A Kiyomura (United States) P Smith	6^{2}	6	6
(Canada) C Bassett (United States) Z Garrison	7^{7}	4	2
(United States) L Antonoplis (United States) B Jordan	5	6^{3}
3	(United Kingdom) J Durie (United Kingdom) A Hobbs	7	7^{7}
5	(United States) R Casals (Australia) W Turnbull	7	4	6
(United States) AM Fernandez (United States) B Herr	5	6	1
(United States) J Davis (United States) H Ludloff	5	4
2	(South Africa) R Fairbank (United States) C Reynolds	7	6

Quarterfinals
8	(United States) A Kiyomura (United States) P Smith	7	4	4
3	(United Kingdom) J Durie (United Kingdom) A Hobbs	5	6	6
5	(United States) R Casals (Australia) W Turnbull	6^{5}	4
2	(South Africa) R Fairbank (United States) C Reynolds	7^{7}	6

Semifinals
3	(United Kingdom) J Durie (United Kingdom) A Hobbs	6	7
2	(South Africa) R Fairbank (United States) C Reynolds	3	5
