= 1983 Virginia Slims of Nashville – Singles =

Singles
- 1983 Virginia Slims of Nashville

Final
- Champion: (United States) Kathleen Horvath
- Runner-up: (Czechoslovakia) Marcela Skuherská
- Score: 6–4, 6–3

Events
Singles	Doubles
← 1982 ·	Virginia Slims of Nashville	· 1984 →

Kathleen Horvath won in the final 6–4, 6–3 against Marcela Skuherská.

== Seeds ==
A champion seed is indicated in bold text while text in italics indicates the round in which that seed was eliminated.

1. (Czechoslovakia) Iva Budařová (quarterfinals)
2. (United States) **Kathleen Horvath (champion)**
3. (United States) Kate Latham (first round)
4. (United States) Candy Reynolds (second round)
5. n/a
6. (United States) Vicki Nelson (quarterfinals)
7. (United States) Nancy Yeargin (second round)
8. (South Africa) Jennifer Mundel (first round)
9. (South Africa) Susan Rollinson (first round)

== Draw ==
=== Key ===
- Q = Qualifier
- WC = Wild card
- LL = Lucky loser
- Alt = Alternate
- SE = Special exempt
- PR = Protected ranking
- ITF = ITF entry
- JE = Junior exempt
- w/o = Walkover
- r = Retired
- d = Defaulted
- SR = Special ranking

First round
1	(Czechoslovakia) **I Budařová**	**6**	**6**
LL	(United States) T Lewis	1	0
(United States) B Norton	2	**6**	3
Q	(Italy) **B Rossi**	**6**	3	**6**
(United States) S Solomon	6	4
(United States) **S Acker**	**7**	**6**
(Australia) **A Minter**	**7**	**6**
8	(South Africa) J Mundel	6	3
4	(United States) **C Reynolds**	**6**	**7**
Q	(Czechoslovakia) Y Brzáková	1	5
(United States) A Henricksson	3	4
Q	(Czechoslovakia) **M Skuherská**	**6**	**6**
(United States) A Holton	3	1
(United States) **P Fendick**	**6**	**6**
(United Kingdom) A Brown	1	2
6	(United States) **V Nelson**	**6**	**6**
7	(United States) **N Yeargin**	**6**	**6**
(United States) L Kosten	1	0
LL	(Hong Kong) **P Hy**	**6**	**6**
LL	(Peru) P Vásquez	1	0
Q	(United States) **K Sands**	**6**	**6**
(United States) B Jordan	4	1
(United States) **P Smith**	4	**6**	**6**
3	(United States) K Latham	**6**	2	2
9	(South Africa) S Rollinson	5	4
(United States) **J Klitch**	**7**	**6**
(United States) **P Teeguarden**	**6**	**7**
LL	(United States) B Bowes	1	5
(France) **C Suire**	4	**6**	**6**
(Australia) C O'Neil	**6**	4	1
(United States) R Blount	1	3
2	(United States) **K Horvath**	**6**	**6**

Second round
1	(Czechoslovakia) **I Budařová**	**6**	**6**
Q	(Italy) B Rossi	3	4
(United States) **S Acker**	3	**6**	**6**
(Australia) A Minter	**6**	3	1
4	(United States) C Reynolds	2	3
Q	(Czechoslovakia) **M Skuherská**	**6**	**6**
(United States) P Fendick	0	1
6	(United States) **V Nelson**	**6**	**6**
7	(United States) N Yeargin	2	3
LL	(Hong Kong) **P Hy**	**6**	**6**
Q	(United States) **K Sands**	**6**	4	**6**
(United States) P Smith	2	**6**	2
(United States) **J Klitch**	5	**6**	**6**
(United States) P Teeguarden	**7**	4	2
(France) C Suire	4	3
2	(United States) **K Horvath**	**6**	**6**

Quarterfinals
1	(Czechoslovakia) I Budařová
(United States) **S Acker**	**w/o**
Q	(Czechoslovakia) **M Skuherská**	**6**	**6**
6	(United States) V Nelson	4	4
LL	(Hong Kong) **P Hy**	4	**6**	**7**
Q	(United States) K Sands	**6**	0	5
(United States) J Klitch	**7**	5	3
2	(United States) **K Horvath**	6	**7**	**6**

Semifinals
(United States) S Acker	4	2
Q	(Czechoslovakia) **M Skuherská**	**6**	**6**
LL	(Hong Kong) P Hy	6	4
2	(United States) **K Horvath**	**7**	**6**

Final
Q	(Czechoslovakia) Marcela Skuherská	4	3
2	(United States) **Kathleen Horvath**	**6**	**6**
