= 1982 Edgbaston Cup – Singles =

Singles
- 1982 Edgbaston Cup

Final
- Champion: (United States) Billie Jean King
- Runner-up: (South Africa) Rosalyn Fairbank
- Score: 6–2, 6–1

Details
- Draw: 56
- Seeds: 14

Events
| Singles | Doubles |
| Birmingham Classic | · 1983 → |

The 1982 Edgbaston Cup – Singles was an event of the 1982 Edgbaston Cup women's tennis tournament and was played on outdoor grass courts at the Edgbaston Priory Club in Birmingham, United Kingdom between 7 June and 13 June 1982. The draw comprised 56 players of which 14 were seeded. Fourth-seeded Billie Jean King won the singles title by defeating unseeded Rosalyn Fairbank in the final 6–2, 6–1.

== Seeds ==
The top eight seeds receive a bye into the second round.

1. (United States) Tracy Austin (third round, retired)
2. (West Germany) Sylvia Hanika (second round)
3. (United States) Barbara Potter (second round)
4. (United States) Billie Jean King (Champion)
5. (United Kingdom) Sue Barker (third round)
6. (United States) Kathy Jordan (third round)
7. (United States) Betsy Nagelsen (semifinals)
8. (United States) Ann Kiyomura (semifinals)
9. (United States) Leslie Allen (quarterfinals)
10. (United Kingdom) Jo Durie (quarterfinals)
11. (South Africa) Yvonne Vermaak (third round)
12. (United States) Wendy White (second round)
13. (United States) Sharon Walsh (first round)
14. (Australia) Evonne Cawley (first round)

== Draw ==
=== Key ===
- Q = Qualifier
- WC = Wild card
- LL = Lucky loser
- Alt = Alternate
- SE = Special exempt
- PR = Protected ranking
- ITF = ITF entry
- JE = Junior exempt
- w/o = Walkover
- r = Retired
- d = Defaulted
- SR = Special ranking

=== Finals ===
Quarterfinals
(Netherlands) Betty Stöve | 6 | 6 | 3
8 | (United States) Ann Kiyomura | 7 | 2 | 6
(South Africa) Rosalyn Fairbank | 6 | 6
10 | (United Kingdom) Jo Durie | 1 | 3
9 | (United States) Leslie Allen | 2 | 4
4 | (United States) Billie Jean King | 6 | 6
7 | (United States) Betsy Nagelsen | 7 | 6
(United States) Nancy Yeargin | 5 | 1

Semifinals
8 | (United States) Ann Kiyomura | 2 | 3
(South Africa) Rosalyn Fairbank | 6 | 6
4 | (United States) Billie Jean King | 6 | 6 | 6
7 | (United States) Betsy Nagelsen | 3 | 7 | 4

Final
(South Africa) Rosalyn Fairbank | 2 | 1
4 | (United States) Billie Jean King | 6 | 6

=== Top half ===
==== Section 1 ====
First round
(United States) S Rimes | 7 | 1 | 6
Q | (United States) K Steinmetz | 5 | 6 | 2
(United States) J Klitch | 6 | 1 | 1
(Netherlands) B Stöve | 4 | 6 | 6
(Australia) A Minter | 2 | 5
(Italy) S Simmonds | 6 | 7
11 | (South Africa) Y Vermaak | 6 | 7
(Netherlands) M Mesker | 3 | 6
(United Kingdom) A Hobbs | 3 | 6 | 6
(United States) J Preyer | 6 | 3 | 3
(United Kingdom) A Croft | 6 | 7
(United States) L duPont | 3 | 5

Second round
1 | (United States) T Austin | 6 | 6
(United States) S Rimes | 1 | 2
(Netherlands) B Stöve | 6 | 6
(Italy) S Simmonds | 3 | 1
11 | (South Africa) Y Vermaak | 0 | 6 | 7
(United Kingdom) A Hobbs | 6 | 3 | 6
(United Kingdom) A Croft | 3 | 6 | 2
8 | (United States) A Kiyomura | 6 | 3 | 6

Third round
1 | (United States) T Austin | 4 | 0 | ret.
(Netherlands) B Stöve | 6 | 4
11 | (South Africa) Y Vermaak | 5 | 3
8 | (United States) A Kiyomura | 7 | 6

Quarterfinals
(Netherlands) B Stöve | 6 | 6 | 3
8 | (United States) A Kiyomura | 7 | 2 | 6

==== Section 2 ====
First round
(South Africa) R Fairbank | 6 | 6
(United States) L-A Thompson | 4 | 3
(United States) D Desfor | 0 | 6 | 3
(South Africa) S Rollinson | 6 | 2 | 6
(United States) P Teeguarden | 6 | 2 | 6
14 | (Australia) E Cawley | 4 | 6 | 3
10 | (United Kingdom) J Durie | 6 | 5 | 6
(United States) K Sands | 4 | 7 | 4
Q | (Australia) E Sayers | 7 | 6 | 6
Q | (United States) R Blount | 5 | 7 | 1
(Sweden) C Jexell | 6 | 7
(United States) A White | 3 | 6

Second round
3 | (United States) B Potter | 2 | 6
(South Africa) R Fairbank | 6 | 7
(South Africa) S Rollinson | 6 | 0 | 4
(United States) P Teeguarden | 4 | 6 | 6
10 | (United Kingdom) J Durie | 6 | 6
Q | (Australia) E Sayers | 1 | 4
(Sweden) C Jexell | 6 | 2 | 5
5 | (United Kingdom) S Barker | 1 | 6 | 7

Third round
(South Africa) R Fairbank | 2 | 6 | 6
(United States) P Teeguarden | 6 | 0 | 1
10 | (United Kingdom) J Durie | 7 | 6
5 | (United Kingdom) S Barker | 5 | 4

Quarterfinals
(South Africa) R Fairbank | 6 | 6
10 | (United Kingdom) J Durie | 1 | 3

=== Bottom half ===
==== Section 3 ====
First round
(United Kingdom) D Jevans | 1 | 1
(United States) R Casals | 6 | 6
(United States) K Latham | 6 | 3 | 6
Q | (United States) T Lewis | 4 | 6 | 3
(South Africa) T Harford | 1 | 6
9 | (United States) L Allen | 6 | 7
13 | (United States) S Walsh | 6 | 5
Q | (United States) N Neviaser | 7 | 7
(Canada) M Blackwood | 5 | 6 | 6
(United States) S Margolin | 7 | 3 | 2
Q | (Australia) P Whytcross | 6 | 4
Q | (United States) L Forood | 7 | 6

Second round
6 | (United States) K Jordan | 6 | 4 | 7
(United States) R Casals | 2 | 6 | 6
(United States) K Latham | 1 | 0
9 | (United States) L Allen | 6 | 6
Q | (United States) N Neviaser | 3 | 7 | 6
(Canada) M Blackwood | 6 | 5 | 7
Q | (United States) L Forood | 7 | 3 | 1
4 | (United States) B J King | 5 | 6 | 6

Third round
6 | (United States) K Jordan | 4 | 2
9 | (United States) L Allen | 6 | 6
(Canada) M Blackwood | 6 | 1
4 | (United States) B J King | 7 | 6

Quarterfinals
9 | (United States) L Allen | 3 | 6
4 | (United States) B J King | 6 | 7

==== Section 4 ====
First round
(Hungary) M Pinterová | 6 | 6
(South Africa) B Mould | 4 | 2
(United States) B Jordan | 4 | 1
(South Africa) J Mundel | 6 | 6
(United States) A Moulton | 6 | 3 | 6
(Australia) S Leo | 4 | 6 | 3
12 | (United States) W White | 6 | 6
(United States) T Holladay | 2 | 1
(United States) B Hallquist | 6 | 6
(France) C Vanier | 4 | 4
(United States) N Yeargin | 6 | 6
Q | (Australia) A Tobin | 1 | 0

Second round
7 | (United States) B Nagelsen | 6 | 7
(Hungary) M Pinterová | 2 | 5
(South Africa) J Mundel | 4 | 4
(United States) A Moulton | 6 | 6
12 | (United States) W White | 4 | 3
(United States) B Hallquist | 6 | 6
(United States) N Yeargin | 6 | 7
2 | (West Germany) S Hanika | 4 | 5

Third round
7 | (United States) B Nagelsen | 6 | 3 | 7
(United States) A Moulton | 3 | 6 | 6
(United States) B Hallquist | 2 | 5
(United States) N Yeargin | 6 | 7

Quarterfinals
7 | (United States) B Nagelsen | 7 | 6
(United States) N Yeargin | 5 | 1
