= 1983 Ridgewood Open – Singles =

Singles
- 1983 Ridgewood Open

Final
- Champion: (United States) Alycia Moulton
- Runner-up: (Sweden) Catrin Jexell
- Score: 6–4, 6–2

Events
Singles	Doubles
Ridgewood Open

Alycia Moulton won in the final 6–4, 6–2 against Catrin Jexell.

== Seeds ==
A champion seed is indicated in bold text while text in italics indicates the round in which that seed was eliminated.

1. (South Africa) Rosalyn Fairbank (first round)
2. (Netherlands) Marcella Mesker (semifinals)
3. (United States) **Alycia Moulton (champion)**
4. (United States) Kate Latham (first round)
5. (United States) Barbara Hallquist (first round)
6. (United States) Vicki Nelson (second round)
7. (Brazil) Patricia Medrado (second round)
8. (United States) Terry Phelps (second round)

== Draw ==
=== Key ===
- Q = Qualifier
- WC = Wild card
- LL = Lucky loser
- Alt = Alternate
- SE = Special exempt
- PR = Protected ranking
- ITF = ITF entry
- JE = Junior exempt
- w/o = Walkover
- r = Retired
- d = Defaulted
- SR = Special ranking

First round
1	(South Africa) R Fairbank	3	2
(Peru) **L Arraya**	**6**	**6**
(United States) G Kim	3	2
(South Africa) **B Mould**	**6**	**6**
LL	(Czechoslovakia) M Pazderová	2	**7**	4
(France) **C Vanier**	**6**	6	**6**
(United States) L Antonoplis	3	2
6	(United States) **V Nelson**	**6**	**6**
3	(United States) **A Moulton**	**6**	**6**
(South Africa) S Rollinson	2	1
(United States) **J Klitch**	**6**	**6**
(United States) A-M Fernandez	2	3
(Australia) A Minter	6	**6**	4
LL	(Australia) **S Leo**	**7**	4	**6**
(Brazil) C Monteiro	5	**6**	2
7	(Brazil) **P Medrado**	**7**	2	**6**
5	(United States) B Hallquist	6	0
Q	(France) **C Suire**	**7**	**6**
(Sweden) **L Sandin**	4	**6**	**6**
(United States) B Norton	**6**	4	4
(Sweden) **C Jexell**	**6**	**6**
(United States) P Teeguarden	2	3
(United States) **K Jones-Shaefer**	**6**	2	**6**
4	(United States) K Latham	4	**6**	1
8	(United States) **T Phelps**	**6**	3	**7**
(Switzerland) C Jolissaint	3	**6**	6
Q	(United States) P Fendick	**7**	2	1
(Switzerland) **P Delhees**	6	**6**	**6**
(South Africa) **J Mundel**	**7**	**6**
Q	(United Kingdom) A Brown	6	3
Q	(Australia) C O'Neil	4	2
2	(Netherlands) **M Mesker**	**6**	**6**

Second round
(Peru) **L Arraya**	**6**	**6**
(South Africa) B Mould	4	3
(France) **C Vanier**	**6**	**7**
6	(United States) V Nelson	3	5
3	(United States) **A Moulton**	**6**	**6**
(United States) J Klitch	1	2
LL	(Australia) **S Leo**	**6**	**6**
7	(Brazil) P Medrado	3	1
Q	(France) C Suire	**7**	1	6
(Sweden) **L Sandin**	5	**6**	**7**
(Sweden) **C Jexell**	**6**	**7**
(United States) K Jones-Shaefer	3	6
8	(United States) T Phelps	3	1
(Switzerland) **P Delhees**	**6**	**6**
(South Africa) J Mundel	4	3
2	(Netherlands) **M Mesker**	**6**	**6**

Quarterfinals
(Peru) **L Arraya**	**6**	**6**
(France) C Vanier	4	4
3	(United States) **A Moulton**	**6**	**6**
LL	(Australia) S Leo	4	2
(Sweden) L Sandin	3	1
(Sweden) **C Jexell**	**6**	**6**
(Switzerland) P Delhees	2	3
2	(Netherlands) **M Mesker**	**6**	**6**

Semifinals
(Peru) L Arraya	4	5
3	(United States) **A Moulton**	**6**	**7**
(Sweden) **C Jexell**	6	**6**	**7**
2	(Netherlands) M Mesker	**7**	3	5

Final
3	(United States) **Alycia Moulton**	**6**	**6**
(Sweden) Catrin Jexell	4	2
