= 1983 Virginia Slims Hall of Fame Classic – Doubles =

Doubles
- 1983 Virginia Slims Hall of Fame Classic

Final
- Champions: (United States) Barbara Potter (United States) Pam Shriver
- Runners-up: (United States) Barbara Jordan (Australia) Elizabeth Sayers
- Score: 6–3, 6–1

Details
- Draw: 16
- Seeds: 4

Events
Singles	Doubles
- Virginia Slims of Newport

No defending champions were declared. Lesley Charles and Sue Mappin, the last tournament winners in 1974, were already retired from professional tennis.

Barbara Potter and Pam Shriver won the title by defeating Barbara Jordan and Elizabeth Sayers 6–3, 6–1 in the final.

== Seeds ==
1. (United States) Barbara Potter / (United States) Pam Shriver (champions)
2. (United States) Rosie Casals / (United States) Leslie Allen (quarterfinals)
3. (United States) Alycia Moulton / (United States) Paula Smith (quarterfinals)
4. (United States) Sherry Acker / (United States) Lele Forood (quarterfinals)

== Draw ==
Key

- Q = Qualifier
- WC = Wild card
- LL = Lucky loser
- Alt = Alternate
- ITF = ITF entry
- PR = Protected ranking
- SR = Special ranking
- SE = Special exempt
- JE = Junior exempt
- JR = Junior Accelerator Programme entrant
- CO = College Accelerator Programme entrant
- NG = Next Gen Accelerator Program entrant
- w/o = Walkover
- r = Retired
- d = Defaulted

=== Draw ===
First round
1	(United States) B Potter (United States) P Shriver	6	6
(United States) Mary-Ann Colville (Netherlands) Ellen Drieberger	3	2
(United States) H Crowe (United States) K Steinmetz	6	7
(United States) T Mochizuki (United States) S Rimes	4	6
3	(United States) A Moulton (United States) P Smith	6	6
(United States) Julie Filkoff (United States) J Forman	0	2
(United States) T Holladay (United States) K O'Brien	7	7
(United States) Lo Allen (United States) Cy MacGregor	6	6
(United States) B Jordan (Australia) E Sayers	6	6
(United States) A Leand (United States) H Ludloff	3	1
(United States) C Copeland (United States) Jackie Joseph	3	3
4	(United States) S Acker (United States) L Forood	6	6
(United States) S Margolin (United States) K Shaefer	0	5
(United States) R Blount (United States) AM Fernandez	6	7
(United States) T Lewis (United States) H Manset	5	7	5
2	(United States) R Casals (United States) Le Allen	7	5	7

Quarterfinals
1	(United States) B Potter (United States) P Shriver	6	3	6
(United States) H Crowe (United States) K Steinmetz	2	6	1
3	(United States) A Moulton (United States) P Smith	5	5
(United States) T Holladay (United States) K O'Brien	7	7
(United States) B Jordan (Australia) E Sayers	7	4	6
4	(United States) S Acker (United States) L Forood	6	6	3
(United States) R Blount (United States) AM Fernandez	6	1	6
2	(United States) R Casals (United States) Le Allen	1	6	3

Semifinals
1	(United States) B Potter (United States) P Shriver	6	7
(United States) T Holladay (United States) K O'Brien	0	5
(United States) B Jordan (Australia) E Sayers	6	6
(United States) R Blount (United States) AM Fernandez	2	2

Final
1	(United States) B Potter (United States) P Shriver	6	6
(United States) B Jordan (Australia) E Sayers	3	1
