= 1984 US Indoors – Singles =

Singles
- 1984 US Indoors

Final
- Champion: (United States) Martina Navratilova
- Runner-up: (United States) Chris Evert-Lloyd
- Score: 6–2, 7–6^{(7–4)}

Details
- Draw: 32 (4Q/4LL)
- Seeds: 9

Events
Singles	Doubles
- U.S. Women's Indoor Championships

Kimberly Shaefer was the defending champion, but was forced to retire in her first round match against Bonnie Gadusek.

Martina Navratilova won the title by defeating Chris Evert-Lloyd 6–2, 7–6^{(7–4)} in the final.

== Seeds ==
1. (United States) Martina Navratilova (champion)
2. (United States) Chris Evert-Lloyd (final)
3. (United Kingdom) Jo Durie (quarterfinals)
4. (Hungary) Andrea Temesvári (first round)
5. (n/a)
6. (West Germany) Sylvia Hanika (quarterfinals)
7. (United States) Tracy Austin (second round)
8. (n/a)
9. (United States) Bonnie Gadusek (quarterfinals)

== Draw ==
Key

- Q = Qualifier
- WC = Wild card
- LL = Lucky loser
- Alt = Alternate
- ITF = ITF entry
- PR = Protected ranking
- SR = Special ranking
- SE = Special exempt
- JE = Junior exempt
- JR = Junior Accelerator Programme entrant
- CO = College Accelerator Programme entrant
- NG = Next Gen Accelerator Program entrant
- w/o = Walkover
- r = Retired
- d = Defaulted

=== Finals ===
Semifinals
1	(United States) Martina Navratilova	6	6
Q	(Netherlands) Marcella Mesker	1	3
(Bulgaria) Manuela Maleeva	4	0
2	(United States) Chris Evert-Lloyd	6	6

Final
1	(United States) Martina Navratilova	6	7^{7}
2	(United States) Chris Evert-Lloyd	2	6^{4}

=== Top half ===
First round
1	(United States) M Navratilova	6	6
(United States) N Yeargin	3	2
(United Kingdom) V Wade	6	6
Q	(France) MC Calleja	4	2
(West Germany) E Pfaff	2	2
(United States) P Casale	6	6
(United States) T Holladay	2	1
7	(United States) T Austin	6	6
3	(United Kingdom) J Durie	6	5	6
Q	(United States) G Kim	2	7	0
LL	(United States) ML Piatek	6	3	6
(Romania) V Ruzici	4	6	2
(Czechoslovakia) H Suková	3	4
Q	(Netherlands) M Mesker	6	6
(United States) J Russell	6	6
LL	(Brazil) C Monteiro	3	3

Second round
1	(United States) M Navratilova	6	6
(United Kingdom) V Wade	0	2
(United States) P Casale	7	6
7	(United States) T Austin	5	3
3	(United Kingdom) J Durie	6	6
LL	(United States) ML Piatek	2	1
Q	(Netherlands) M Mesker	6	6	6
(United States) J Russell	2	7	3

Quarterfinals
1	(United States) M Navratilova	6	6
(United States) P Casale	3	2
3	(United Kingdom) J Durie	6	3	4
Q	(Netherlands) M Mesker	2	6	6

Semifinals
1	(United States) M Navratilova	6	6
Q	(Netherlands) M Mesker	1	3

=== Bottom half ===
First round
9	(United States) B Gadusek	6	3
(United States) K Shaefer	0	2^{r}
(United States) L Bonder	6	6
LL	(United States) S Acker	3	4
(United States) B Potter	3	3
(United States) A Leand	6	6
(Bulgaria) M Maleeva	6	6
4	(Hungary) A Temesvári	1	0
6	(West Germany) S Hanika	6	3	6
(United States) B Herr	4	6	3
LL	(Italy) R Reggi	1	0
(South Africa) R Fairbank	6	6
(Canada) C Bassett	6	6
Q	(United States) G Purdy	1	0
(South Africa) B Mould	2	3
2	(United States) C Evert-Lloyd	6	6

Second round
9	(United States) B Gadusek	3	6	6
(United States) L Bonder	6	2	1
(United States) A Leand	5	6	3
(Bulgaria) M Maleeva	7	2	6
6	(West Germany) S Hanika	6	1	7
(South Africa) R Fairbank	4	6	6
(Canada) C Bassett	6	2	3
2	(United States) C Evert-Lloyd	2	6	6

Quarterfinals
9	(United States) B Gadusek	0	2
(Bulgaria) M Maleeva	6	6
6	(West Germany) S Hanika	2	2
2	(United States) C Evert-Lloyd	6	6

Semifinals
(Bulgaria) M Maleeva	4	0
2	(United States) C Evert-Lloyd	6	6
