= 1983 Virginia Slims of Los Angeles – Doubles =

Doubles
- 1983 Virginia Slims of Los Angeles

Final
- Champions: (United States) Martina Navratilova (United States) Pam Shriver
- Runners-up: (United States) Betsy Nagelsen (Romania) Virginia Ruzici
- Score: 6–1, 6–0

Details
- Draw: 32
- Seeds: 8

Events
Singles	Doubles
- LA Women's Tennis Championships

Kathy Jordan and Anne Smith were the defending champions, but Smith did not compete this year. Jordan teamed up with JoAnne Russell and lost in the semifinals to Betsy Nagelsen and Virginia Ruzici.

Martina Navratilova and Pam Shriver won the title by defeating Nagelsen and Ruzici 6–1, 6–0 in the final.

== Seeds ==
1. (United States) Martina Navratilova / (United States) Pam Shriver (champions)
2. (United States) Kathy Jordan / (United States) JoAnne Russell (semifinals)
3. (United States) Betsy Nagelsen / (Romania) Virginia Ruzici (final)
4. (United Kingdom) Jo Durie / (United States) Ann Kiyomura (semifinals)
5. (United States) Alycia Moulton / (Australia) Wendy Turnbull (quarterfinals)
6. (United States) Leslie Allen / (United States) Rosie Casals (quarterfinals)
7. (United States) Elise Burgin / (United States) Sharon Walsh (quarterfinals)
8. (United States) Andrea Jaeger / (United States) Paula Smith (quarterfinals)

== Draw ==
Key

- Q = Qualifier
- WC = Wild card
- LL = Lucky loser
- Alt = Alternate
- ITF = ITF entry
- PR = Protected ranking
- SR = Special ranking
- SE = Special exempt
- JE = Junior exempt
- JR = Junior Accelerator Programme entrant
- CO = College Accelerator Programme entrant
- NG = Next Gen Accelerator Program entrant
- w/o = Walkover
- r = Retired
- d = Defaulted

=== Finals ===
Semifinals
1	(United States) Martina Navratilova (United States) Pam Shriver	2	7	6
4	(United Kingdom) Jo Durie (United States) Ann Kiyomura	6	6	1
3	(United States) Betsy Nagelsen (Romania) Virginia Ruzici	3	6	6
2	(United States) Kathy Jordan (United States) JoAnne Russell	6	1	4

Final
1	(United States) Martina Navratilova (United States) Pam Shriver	6	6
3	(United States) Betsy Nagelsen (Romania) Virginia Ruzici	1	0

=== Top half ===
First round
1	(United States) M Navratilova (United States) P Shriver	6	6
(Czechoslovakia) I Budařová (Czechoslovakia) M Skuherská	3	0
(New Zealand) C Newton (Australia) P Whytcross	4	6	6
(United States) K Latham (United States) K Steinmetz	6	0	7
(Australia) S Leo (Brazil) C Monteiro	6	6
(United States) J Davis (United States) H Ludloff	3	2
(Australia) B Remilton (Japan) N Sato	4	4
5	(United States) A Moulton (Australia) W Turnbull	6	6
4	(United Kingdom) J Durie (United States) A Kiyomura	6	6
(United States) L Antonoplis (United States) AM Fernandez	3	4
(United States) T Mochizuki (United States) K Sands	6	7	6
(United States) T Holladay (United States) K O'Brien	7	6	4
(United Kingdom) A Hobbs (Czechoslovakia) H Suková	6	6
(United States) T Lewis (United States) S McInerney	2	0
(United States) C Benjamin (United States) R Blount	3	6	6
8	(United States) A Jaeger (United States) P Smith	6	4	7

Second round
1	(United States) M Navratilova (United States) P Shriver	6	6
(United States) K Latham (United States) K Steinmetz	1	2
(Australia) S Leo (Brazil) C Monteiro	4	6
5	(United States) A Moulton (Australia) W Turnbull	6	7
4	(United Kingdom) J Durie (United States) A Kiyomura	6	6
(United States) T Mochizuki (United States) K Sands	2	0
(United Kingdom) A Hobbs (Czechoslovakia) H Suková	6	2
8	(United States) A Jaeger (United States) P Smith	7	6

Quarterfinals
1	(United States) M Navratilova (United States) P Shriver	6	7
5	(United States) A Moulton (Australia) W Turnbull	1	5
4	(United Kingdom) J Durie (United States) A Kiyomura	6	7
8	(United States) A Jaeger (United States) P Smith	4	6

Semifinals
1	(United States) M Navratilova (United States) P Shriver	2	7	6
4	(United Kingdom) J Durie (United States) A Kiyomura	6	6	1

=== Bottom half ===
First round
6	(United States) Le Allen (United States) R Casals	6	6
(Australia) A Minter (Australia) E Minter	1	2
(United States) A Henricksson (South Africa) J Mundel	6	6
(United States) L Gordon (Poland) I Kuczyńska	4	4
(South Korea) D-h Lee (Romania) L Romanov	1	4
(United Kingdom) S Barker (United States) W White	6	6
(Japan) E Inoue (United States) V Nelson	2	5
3	(United States) B Nagelsen (Romania) V Ruzici	6	7
7	(United States) E Burgin (United States) S Walsh	6	6
(United States) L Bonder (United States) D Gilbert	3	4
(United States) A Holton (United States) Kathy Holton	2	2
(United States) B Hallquist (United States) A White	6	6
(Argentina) E Longo (Peru) P Vásquez	2	3
(United States) S Acker (United States) L Forood	6	6
(Czechoslovakia) Y Brzáková (Czechoslovakia) K Skronská	3	1
2	(United States) K Jordan (United States) J Russell	6	6

Second round
6	(United States) Le Allen (United States) R Casals	6	7
(United States) A Henricksson (South Africa) J Mundel	0	6
(United Kingdom) S Barker (United States) W White	6	2	4
3	(United States) B Nagelsen (Romania) V Ruzici	3	6	6
7	(United States) E Burgin (United States) S Walsh	6	7	7
(United States) B Hallquist (United States) A White	7	6	6
(United States) S Acker (United States) L Forood	2	3
2	(United States) K Jordan (United States) J Russell	6	6

Quarterfinals
6	(United States) Le Allen (United States) R Casals	3	4
3	(United States) B Nagelsen (Romania) V Ruzici	6	6
7	(United States) E Burgin (United States) S Walsh	4	1
2	(United States) K Jordan (United States) J Russell	6	6

Semifinals
3	(United States) B Nagelsen (Romania) V Ruzici	3	6	6
2	(United States) K Jordan (United States) J Russell	6	1	4
