= 1983 BMW Championships – Singles =

Singles
- 1983 BMW Championships

Final
- Champion: (United States) Martina Navratilova
- Runner-up: (Australia) Wendy Turnbull
- Score: 6–1, 6–1

Details
- Draw: 64 (8Q)
- Seeds: 16

Events
Singles	Doubles
- Eastbourne International

Martina Navratilova successfully defended her title by defeating Wendy Turnbull 6–1, 6–1 in the final.

== Seeds ==
1. (United States) Martina Navratilova (champion)
2. (United States) Andrea Jaeger (quarterfinals)
3. (United States) Tracy Austin (semifinals, retired)
4. (West Germany) Bettina Bunge (quarterfinals)
5. (Australia) Wendy Turnbull (final)
6. (United States) Kathy Rinaldi (first round)
7. (Czechoslovakia) Hana Mandlíková (third round)
8. (United States) Barbara Potter (first round)
9. (Bulgaria) Manuela Maleeva (second round)
10. (United States) Zina Garrison (semifinals)
11. (West Germany) Eva Pfaff (second round)
12. (United Kingdom) Jo Durie (quarterfinals)
13. (South Africa) Rosalyn Fairbank (third round)
14. (United States) Kathy Jordan (second round)
15. (Canada) Carling Bassett (first round)
16. (West Germany) Claudia Kohde-Kilsch (third round)

== Draw ==
Key

- Q = Qualifier
- WC = Wild card
- LL = Lucky loser
- Alt = Alternate
- ITF = ITF entry
- PR = Protected ranking
- SR = Special ranking
- SE = Special exempt
- JE = Junior exempt
- JR = Junior Accelerator Programme entrant
- CO = College Accelerator Programme entrant
- NG = Next Gen Accelerator Program entrant
- w/o = Walkover
- r = Retired
- d = Defaulted

=== Finals ===
Quarterfinals
1	(United States) Martina Navratilova	6	6
12	(United Kingdom) Jo Durie	2	1
4	(West Germany) Bettina Bunge	3	2
10	(United States) Zina Garrison	6	6
(United States) Beth Herr	5	1
3	(United States) Tracy Austin	7	6
5	(Australia) Wendy Turnbull	6	6
2	(United States) Andrea Jaeger	3	4

Semifinals
1	(United States) Martina Navratilova	6	6
10	(United States) Zina Garrison	2	3
3	(United States) Tracy Austin	1	0^{r}
5	(Australia) Wendy Turnbull	6	1

Final
1	(United States) Martina Navratilova	6	6
5	(Australia) Wendy Turnbull	1	1

=== Top half ===
==== Section 1 ====
First round
1	(United States) M Navratilova	6	6
(United States) E Burgin	2	4
(United States) S Collins	2	6^{6}
(United Kingdom) S Barker	6	7^{8}
(Brazil) P Medrado	1	4
(South Africa) Y Vermaak	6	6
(Czechoslovakia) K Skronská	1	6	2
13	(South Africa) R Fairbank	6	4	6
12	(United Kingdom) J Durie	6	6
(United Kingdom) K Brasher	3	1
(United States) L Allen	3	3
(Socialist Federal Republic of Yugoslavia) M Jaušovec	6	6
(United States) C Benjamin	6	4	10
(United States) B Hallquist	3	6	8
Q	(United States) H Ludloff	3	7^{10}	6
6	(United States) K Rinaldi	6	6^{8}	1

Second round
1	(United States) M Navratilova	6	6
(United Kingdom) S Barker	1	0
(South Africa) Y Vermaak	1	0
13	(South Africa) R Fairbank	6	6
12	(United Kingdom) J Durie	6	6
(Socialist Federal Republic of Yugoslavia) M Jaušovec	3	1
(United States) C Benjamin	3	6^{6}
Q	(United States) H Ludloff	6	7^{8}

Third round
1	(United States) M Navratilova	6	6
13	(South Africa) R Fairbank	0	0
12	(United Kingdom) J Durie	6	6
Q	(United States) H Ludloff	3	3

Quarterfinals
1	(United States) M Navratilova	6	6
12	(United Kingdom) J Durie	2	1

==== Section 2 ====
First round
4	(West Germany) B Bunge	7	6
(United States) S Mascarin	5	4
Q	(United States) J Davis	6	6
Q	(United States) A Henricksson	1	3
(Netherlands) B Stöve	1	2
Q	(United States) P Smith	6	6
(Netherlands) M Mesker	6	7^{7}
15	(Canada) C Bassett	2	6^{4}
10	(United States) Z Garrison	6	6
Q	(United States) K Steinmetz	2	2
(United States) W White	6	6
(South Africa) J Mundel	4	3
(United States) A White	6	6
(United States) S Walsh	0	1
(United Kingdom) A Brown	2	3
7	(Czechoslovakia) H Mandlíková	6	6

Second round
4	(West Germany) B Bunge	7	6
Q	(United States) J Davis	5	3
Q	(United States) P Smith	2	6	6
(Netherlands) M Mesker	6	2	3
10	(United States) Z Garrison	6	7^{7}
(United States) W White	4	6^{3}
(United States) A White	2	3
7	(Czechoslovakia) H Mandlíková	6	6

Third round
4	(West Germany) B Bunge	6	6
Q	(United States) P Smith	1	0
10	(United States) Z Garrison	6	7
7	(Czechoslovakia) H Mandlíková	3	5

Quarterfinals
4	(West Germany) B Bunge	3	2
10	(United States) Z Garrison	6	6

=== Bottom half ===
==== Section 3 ====
First round
8	(United States) B Potter	4	3
(United States) A Moulton	6	6
(Sweden) C Jexell	6^{3}	1
(Italy) R Reggi	7^{7}	6
(United States) ML Piatek	6	1	2
(United States) B Herr	4	6	6
(France) C Vanier	6^{5}	3
9	(Bulgaria) M Maleeva	7^{7}	6
14	(United States) K Jordan	7^{7}	6
(United Kingdom) S Gomer	6^{1}	1
(United Kingdom) V Wade	6	6^{6}	6
(United States) B Nagelsen	3	7^{8}	4
(United Kingdom) D Jarrett	5	3
(Romania) L Romanov	7	6
(United Kingdom) A Hobbs	4	0
3	(United States) T Austin	6	6

Second round
(United States) A Moulton	6	6
(Italy) R Reggi	3	3
(United States) B Herr	6	6
9	(Bulgaria) M Maleeva	0	1
14	(United States) K Jordan	2	2
(United Kingdom) V Wade	6	6
(Romania) L Romanov	3	1
3	(United States) T Austin	6	6

Third round
(United States) A Moulton	3	6	0
(United States) B Herr	6	2	6
(United Kingdom) V Wade	2	2
3	(United States) T Austin	6	6

Quarterfinals
(United States) B Herr	5	1
3	(United States) T Austin	7	6

==== Section 4 ====
First round
5	(Australia) W Turnbull	7^{7}	6
(United States) A Leand	6^{4}	0
(United States) L Bonder	7^{7}	0	3
(Italy) S Simmonds	6^{3}	6	6
Q	(United Kingdom) J Salmon	0	2
Q	(United States) R Casals	6	6
(United States) T Phelps	1	4
11	(West Germany) E Pfaff	6	6
16	(West Germany) C Kohde-Kilsch	6	6
(United States) A Kiyomura	4	3
(United States) P Casale	7	6
(United States) A Holton	5	1
Q	(Hong Kong) P Hy	6	6
(United States) N Yeargin	4	3
(United States) C Reynolds	3	6^{6}
2	(United States) A Jaeger	6	7^{8}

Second round
5	(Australia) W Turnbull	6	1	6
(Italy) S Simmonds	4	6	4
Q	(United States) R Casals	7	6
11	(West Germany) E Pfaff	5	2
16	(West Germany) C Kohde-Kilsch	7^{7}	6
(United States) P Casale	6^{3}	3
Q	(Hong Kong) P Hy	3	1
2	(United States) A Jaeger	6	6

Third round
5	(Australia) W Turnbull	6	6
Q	(United States) R Casals	2	1
16	(West Germany) C Kohde-Kilsch	5	4
2	(United States) A Jaeger	7	6

Quarterfinals
5	(Australia) W Turnbull	6	6
2	(United States) A Jaeger	3	4
