= 1983 Virginia Slims of Los Angeles – Singles =

Singles
- 1983 Virginia Slims of Los Angeles

Final
- Champion: (United States) Martina Navratilova
- Runner-up: (United States) Chris Evert-Lloyd
- Score: 6–1, 6–3

Details
- Draw: 56 (9Q/1LL)
- Seeds: 14

Events
Singles	Doubles
- LA Women's Tennis Championships

Mima Jaušovec was the defending champion, but did not compete this year.

Martina Navratilova won the title by defeating Chris Evert-Lloyd 6–1, 6–3 in the final.

== Seeds ==
The first eight seeds received a bye to the second round.

1. (United States) Martina Navratilova (champion)
2. (United States) Chris Evert-Lloyd (final)
3. (United States) Pam Shriver (semifinals)
4. (West Germany) Sylvia Hanika (second round)
5. (Australia) Wendy Turnbull (third round)
6. (n/a)
7. (Romania) Virginia Ruzici (third round)
8. (United Kingdom) Jo Durie (quarterfinals)
9. (United States) Kathy Jordan (third round)
10. (Czechoslovakia) Helena Suková (second round)
11. (Czechoslovakia) Iva Budařová (second round)
12. (United States) Alycia Moulton (quarterfinals)
13. (United States) Wendy White (quarterfinals)
14. (United States) JoAnne Russell (third round)

== Draw ==
Key

- Q = Qualifier
- WC = Wild card
- LL = Lucky loser
- Alt = Alternate
- ITF = ITF entry
- PR = Protected ranking
- SR = Special ranking
- SE = Special exempt
- JE = Junior exempt
- JR = Junior Accelerator Programme entrant
- CO = College Accelerator Programme entrant
- NG = Next Gen Accelerator Program entrant
- w/o = Walkover
- r = Retired
- d = Defaulted

=== Finals ===
Quarterfinals
1	(United States) Martina Navratilova	6	6
13	(United States) Wendy White	0	2
3	(United States) Pam Shriver	6	7
12	(United States) Alycia Moulton	3	6
(United States) Elise Burgin	3	6	2
(United States) Kate Latham	6	4	6
8	(United Kingdom) Jo Durie	5	2
2	(United States) Chris Evert-Lloyd	7	6

Semifinals
1	(United States) Martina Navratilova	6	6
3	(United States) Pam Shriver	2	1
(United States) Kate Latham	1	1
2	(United States) Chris Evert-Lloyd	6	6

Final
1	(United States) Martina Navratilova	6	6
2	(United States) Chris Evert-Lloyd	1	3

=== Top half ===
==== Section 1 ====
First round
(United States) A Henricksson	4	6	6
Q	(Australia) P Whytcross	6	4	1
Q	(United States) T Holladay	2	4
Q	(United States) R Casals	6	6
(South Africa) J Mundel	1	1
9	(United States) K Jordan	6	6
13	(United States) W White	7	6
(United States) S Collins	5	3
(United States) S Acker	6	4	3
(United States) H Ludloff	2	6	6
(South Korea) D-h Lee	6	7
(United States) S Walsh	4	6

Second round
1	(United States) M Navratilova	6	6
(United States) A Henricksson	1	1
Q	(United States) R Casals	0	6	2
9	(United States) K Jordan	6	2	6
13	(United States) W White	7	6
(United States) H Ludloff	6	2
(South Korea) D-h Lee	2	0
5	(Australia) W Turnbull	6	6

Third round
1	(United States) M Navratilova	6	6
9	(United States) K Jordan	1	0
13	(United States) W White	6	6	7
5	(Australia) W Turnbull	4	7	6

Quarterfinals
1	(United States) M Navratilova	6	6
13	(United States) W White	0	2

==== Section 2 ====
First round
Q	(United Kingdom) A Croft	6	6
(United States) P Smith	2	4
(Australia) A Minter	6	4
(United States) AM Fernandez	7	6
Q	(United States) K Gompert	6	6
(United States) T Mochizuki	2	4
12	(United States) A Moulton	6	6
Q	(United States) T Lewis	0	1
(Australia) S Leo	1	7	6
Q	(United States) K O'Brien	6	6	3
(United States) B Hallquist	6	6
(United States) H Na	4	3

Second round
3	(United States) P Shriver	6	6
Q	(United Kingdom) A Croft	3	1
(United States) AM Fernandez	2	3
Q	(United States) K Gompert	6	6
12	(United States) A Moulton	7	6
(Australia) S Leo	6	2
(United States) B Hallquist	3	4
7	(Romania) V Ruzici	6	6

Third round
3	(United States) P Shriver	6	6
Q	(United States) K Gompert	3	2
12	(United States) A Moulton	6	7
7	(Romania) V Ruzici	3	6

Quarterfinals
3	(United States) P Shriver	6	7
12	(United States) A Moulton	3	6

=== Bottom half ===
==== Section 3 ====
First round
Q	(Peru) P Vásquez	4	0
(United States) E Burgin	6	6
(United States) B Nagelsen	6	3	6
(United States) C Benjamin	4	6	7
(Japan) E Inoue	3	3
11	(Czechoslovakia) I Budařová	6	6
(United States) J Davis	4	4
(United States) A Kiyomura	6	6
Q	(United States) C Fernandez	4	1
(United Kingdom) S Barker	6	6
(United States) K Latham	1	6	6
(United States) V Nelson	6	3	0

Second round
LL	(Romania) L Romanov	4	3
(United States) E Burgin	6	6
(United States) C Benjamin	6	4	7
11	(Czechoslovakia) I Budařová	1	6	6
(United States) A Kiyomura	4	3
(United Kingdom) S Barker	6	6
(United States) K Latham	3	7	6
4	(West Germany) S Hanika	6	6	3

Third round
(United States) E Burgin	7	6
(United States) C Benjamin	6	2
(United Kingdom) S Barker	2	4
(United States) K Latham	6	6

Quarterfinals
(United States) E Burgin	3	6	2
(United States) K Latham	6	4	6

==== Section 4 ====
First round
(United States) K Shaefer	7	6
(Brazil) C Monteiro	6	2
(United States) A White	6	6
(United States) A Holton	3	4
(United States) L Antonoplis	2	1
10	(Czechoslovakia) H Suková	6	6
14	(United States) J Russell	6	6
(United States) Le Allen	4	2
(United States) D Gilbert	7	6
(United States) K Sands	5	1
(Czechoslovakia) K Skronská	4	6	4
(United States) L Forood	6	2	6

Second round
8	(United Kingdom) J Durie	6	6
(United States) K Shaefer	3	3
(United States) A White	4	7	7
10	(Czechoslovakia) H Suková	6	6	5
14	(United States) J Russell	6	6
(United States) D Gilbert	4	2
(United States) L Forood	4	2
2	(United States) C Evert-Lloyd	6	6

Third round
8	(United Kingdom) J Durie	7	6
(United States) A White	5	4
14	(United States) J Russell	6	1	2
2	(United States) C Evert-Lloyd	4	6	6

Quarterfinals
8	(United Kingdom) J Durie	5	2
2	(United States) C Evert-Lloyd	7	6
