= 1983 Virginia Slims Hall of Fame Classic =

- Date: July 11 – 17
- Edition: 5th
- Draw: 32S / 16D
- Prize money: $100,000
- Surface: Grass / outdoor
- Location: Newport, Rhode Island, U.S.
- Venue: Newport Casino

Champions

Singles
- (United States) Alycia Moulton

Doubles
- (United States) Barbara Potter / (United States) Pam Shriver
- Virginia Slims of Newport

The 1983 Virginia Slims Hall of Fame Classic, also known as the Virginia Slims of Newport, was a women's tennis tournament played on outdoor grass courts in Newport, Rhode Island in the United States that was part of the 1983 Virginia Slims World Championship Series. The tournament was held from July 11 through July 17, 1983. Third-seeded Alycia Moulton won the singles title.

== Finals ==
=== Singles ===
(United States) Alycia Moulton defeated (United States) Kimberly Shaefer 6–3, 6–2

- It was Moulton's 3rd title of the year and the 4th of her career.

=== Doubles ===
(United States) Barbara Potter / (United States) Pam Shriver defeated (United States) Barbara Jordan / (Australia) Elizabeth Sayers 6–3 6–1

- It was Potter's 1st title of the year and the 7th of her career. It was Shriver's 9th title of the year and the 43rd of her career.
