= 1983 Edgbaston Cup – Singles =

Singles
- 1983 Edgbaston Cup

Final
- Champion: (United States) Billie Jean King
- Runner-up: (United States) Alycia Moulton
- Score: 6–3, 7–5

Details
- Draw: 56 (8 Q )
- Seeds: 16

Events
Singles	Doubles
- Birmingham Classic

Billie Jean King was the defending champion and she won in the final 6–3, 7–5 against Alycia Moulton. It was King's last singles tournament title of her career and she became the oldest WTA player to win a singles tournament at 39 years, 7 months and 23 days.

== Seeds ==
A champion seed is indicated in bold text while text in italics indicates the round in which that seed was eliminated. The top eight seeds received a bye to the second round.

1. (United States) **Billie Jean King (champion)**
2. (United States) Zina Garrison (semifinals)
3. (South Africa) Rosalyn Fairbank (third round)
4. (Australia) Evonne Cawley (third round)
5. (United States) Kathy Jordan (second round)
6. (South Africa) Yvonne Vermaak (quarterfinals)
7. (United States) Andrea Leand (second round)
8. (United States) Wendy White-Prausa (second round)
9. (Bulgaria) Manuela Maleeva (first round)
10. (United States) Ann Kiyomura (first round)
11. (United States) Beth Herr (third round)
12. n/a
13. (United States) Anne White (semifinals)
14. n/a
15. (United States) Alycia Moulton (final)
16. (United States) Betty Stöve (first round)

== Draw ==
Key

- Q = Qualifier
- WC = Wild card
- LL = Lucky loser
- Alt = Alternate
- ITF = ITF entry
- PR = Protected ranking
- SR = Special ranking
- SE = Special exempt
- JE = Junior exempt
- JR = Junior Accelerator Programme entrant
- CO = College Accelerator Programme entrant
- NG = Next Gen Accelerator Program entrant
- w/o = Walkover
- r = Retired
- d = Defaulted

=== Finals ===
Semifinals
1	(United States) **Billie Jean King**	**7**	**6**
13	(United States) Anne White	**6**	2
15	(United States) **Alycia Moulton**	5^{r}
2	(United States) Zina Garrison	0

Final
1	(United States) **Billie Jean King**	**6**	**7**
15	(United States) Alycia Moulton	0	5

=== Top half ===
==== Section 1 ====
First round
(United States) **P Casale**	**6**	**6**
(Sweden) C Jexell	1	3
(United States) **S Collins**	**6**	**6**
(United Kingdom) A Brown	1	4
(United States) A-M Fernandez	4	0
10	(United States) **A Kiyomura**	**6**	**6**
11	(United States) B Herr	1	**7**	5
(United States) **S Acker**	**6**	6	**7**
Q	(Australia) **E Sayers**	**6**	**6**
(United States) L Antonoplis	0	2
(United States) **L Forood**	2	**6**	**6**
(Italy) S Simmonds	**6**	3	4

Second round
1	(United States) **BJ King**	**6**	**6**
(United States) P Casale	2	4
(United States) S Collins	1	3
10	(United States) **A Kiyomura**	**6**	**6**
(United States) S Acker	3	4
Q	(Australia) **E Sayers**	**6**	**6**
(United States) **L Forood**	2	**6**	**6**
8	(United States) Wendy White	**6**	3	1

Third round
1	(United States) **BJ King**	**6**	**6**
10	(United States) A Kiyomura	2	1
Q	(Australia) **E Sayers**	**6**	**7**
(United States) L Forood	1	6

Quarterfinals
1	(United States) **BJ King**	**6**	**6**
Q	(Australia) E Sayers	3	4

==== Section 2 ====
First round
(United States) P Fendick	3	**6**	3
(South Africa) **J Mundel**	**6**	3	**6**
(United States) C Benjamin	3	0
Q	(United States) **A Henricksson**	**6**	**6**
Q	(United States) A Minter	2	5
13	(United States) **A White**	**6**	**7**
(United Kingdom) **D Jarrett**	5	4
(United Kingdom) **S Barker**	**7**	**6**
(United States) **K Steinmetz**	**7**	**6**
(United Kingdom) K Brasher	6	2
(United States) **S Leo**	**6**	**6**
(United States) T Mochizuki	2	3

Second round
4	(Australia) **E Cawley**	**6**	3	**8**
(South Africa) J Mundel	2	**6**	6
Q	(United States) A Henricksson	2	4
13	(United States) **A White**	**6**	**6**
(United Kingdom) **S Barker**	**7**	**7**
(Australia) K Steinmetz	5	6
(Australia) S Leo	3	4
6	(South Africa) **Y Vermaak**	**6**	**6**

Third round
4	(Australia) E Cawley	2	5
13	(United States) **A White**	**6**	**7**
(United Kingdom) S Barker	3	1
6	(South Africa) **Y Vermaak**	**6**	**6**

Quarterfinals
13	(United States) **A White**	**7**	2	**10**
6	(South Africa) Y Vermaak	6	**6**	8

=== Bottom half ===
==== Section 3 ====
First round
(Italy) **R Reggi**	**6**	**6**
Q	(United Kingdom) C Drury	3	3
Q	(Australia) C O'Neil	3	2
Q	(United States) **B Jordan**	**6**	**6**
(United States) **N Yeargin**	**6**	2	**6**
9	(Bulgaria) M Maleeva	3	**6**	3
15	(United States) **A Moulton**	**6**	**7**
(United States) H Ludloff	3	5
Q	(United Kingdom) J Salmon	3	3
Q	(Australia) **B Remilton**	**6**	**6**
(United States) K Latham	**6**	6	3
(France) **C Vanier**	3	**7**	**6**

Second round
7	(United States) A Leand	**7**	5	2
(Italy) **R Reggi**	5	**7**	**6**
Q	(United States) B Jordan	5	4
(United States) **N Yeargin**	**7**	**6**
15	(United States) **A Moulton**	**6**	**6**
Q	(Australia) B Remilton	3	4
(France) C Vanier	2	4
3	(South Africa) **R Fairbank**	**6**	**6**

Third round
(Italy) R Reggi	4	5
(United States) **N Yeargin**	**6**	**7**
15	(United States) **A Moulton**	**7**	1	**6**
3	(South Africa) R Fairbank	6	**6**	3

Quarterfinals
(United States) N Yeargin	5	3
15	(United States) **A Moulton**	**7**	**6**

==== Section 4 ====
First round
(United States) B Hallquist	4	6
(United States) **S Walsh**	**6**	**7**
(United States) S Mascarin	3	1
(Brazil) **C Monteiro**	**6**	**6**
16	(Netherlands) B Stöve	2	2
LL	(United States) **K Sands**	**6**	**6**
(South Africa) B Mould	4	3
(Switzerland) **C Jolissaint**	**6**	**6**
(United States) **E Burgin**	3	**6**	**6**
(United States) L Allen	**6**	2	1
(United States) B Nagelsen	2	2
LL	(Japan) **E Inoue**	**6**	**6**

Second round
5	(United States) K Jordan	2	**6**	1
(United States) **S Walsh**	**6**	1	**6**
(Brazil) **C Monteiro**	2	**6**	**7**
LL	(United States) K Sands	**6**	2	5
(Switzerland) **C Jolissaint**	**6**	**6**
(United States) E Burgin	4	4
LL	(Japan) E Inoue	2	4
2	(United States) **Z Garrison**	**6**	**6**

Third round
(United States) **S Walsh**	**6**	**6**
(Brazil) C Monteiro	4	2
(Switzerland) C Jolissaint	**6**	2	2
2	(United States) **Z Garrison**	1	**6**	**6**

Quarterfinals
(United States) S Walsh	**7**	3	4
2	(United States) **Z Garrison**	6	**6**	**6**
