= 1983 Ridgewood Open =

Women's tennis tournament

- Date: February 21 – 28
- Edition: 1st
- Category: Ginny Tournament Circuit
- Draw: 32S / 16D
- Prize money: $50,000
- Surface: Carpet / indoor
- Location: Ridgewood, New Jersey, U.S.

Champions

Singles
- (United States) Alycia Moulton

Doubles
- (South Africa) Beverly Mould / (Australia) Elizabeth Sayers
| Ridgewood Open |

The 1983 Ridgewood Open was a women's tennis tournament played on indoor carpet courts in Ridgewood, New Jersey in the United States that was part of the Ginny Circuit (Note: The 1983 Ginny Tournament Circuit consisted of eight $50,000 events played between February and September, followed by a $100,000 Ginny Championships in November. All tournaments were held in the United States.) of the 1983 Virginia Slims World Championship Series. The tournament was held from February 21 through February 28, 1983. Third-seeded Alycia Moulton won the singles title.

== Finals ==
=== Singles ===
(United States) Alycia Moulton defeated (Sweden) Catrin Jexell 6–4, 6–2

- It was Moulton's 1st title of the year and the 2nd of her career.

=== Doubles ===
(South Africa) Beverly Mould / (Australia) Elizabeth Sayers defeated (South Africa) Rosalyn Fairbank / (Australia) Susan Leo 7–6, 4–6, 7–5

- It was Mould's only title of the year and the 2nd of her career. It was Sayers' 1st title of the year and the 1st of her career.
