= 1983 U.S. Women's Indoor Championships – Doubles =

Doubles
- 1983 U.S. Women's Indoor Championships

Final
- Champions: (United States) Billie Jean King (United States) Sharon Walsh
- Runners-up: (United States) Kathy Jordan (United States) Barbara Potter
- Score: 3–6, 6–3, 6–4

Details
- Draw: 16
- Seeds: 4

Events
Singles	Doubles
- U.S. Women's Indoor Championships

Rosie Casals and Wendy Turnbull were the defending champions, but lost in the first round to Barbara Jordan and Elizabeth Sayers.

Billie Jean King and Sharon Walsh won the title by defeating Kathy Jordan and Barbara Potter 3–6, 6–3, 6–4 in the final.

== Seeds ==
1. (South Africa) Rosalyn Fairbank / (United States) Candy Reynolds (quarterfinals)
2. (United States) Billie Jean King / (United States) Sharon Walsh (champions)
3. (United States) Rosie Casals / (Australia) Wendy Turnbull (first round)
4. (United States) Kathy Jordan / (United States) Barbara Potter (final)

== Draw ==
Key

- Q = Qualifier
- WC = Wild card
- LL = Lucky loser
- Alt = Alternate
- ITF = ITF entry
- PR = Protected ranking
- SR = Special ranking
- SE = Special exempt
- JE = Junior exempt
- JR = Junior Accelerator Programme entrant
- CO = College Accelerator Programme entrant
- NG = Next Gen Accelerator Program entrant
- w/o = Walkover
- r = Retired
- d = Defaulted

=== Draw ===
First round
1	(South Africa) R Fairbank (United States) C Reynolds	5	6	6
(United States) B Gerken (United States) F Raschiatore	7	2	3
(United States) Le Allen (United States) A Moulton	6	6
(Australia) A Minter (United States) K Shaefer	1	4
4	(United States) K Jordan (United States) B Potter	6	6
(United States) P Casale (United States) Z Garrison	3	4
(United States) B Nagelsen (Romania) V Ruzici	6	6
(Canada) C Bassett (United States) T Phelps	3	1
(South Africa) I Kloss (United States) H Ludloff	6	7
(United States) B Herr (United States) A White	1	5
(United States) B Jordan (Australia) E Sayers	0	6	7
3	(United States) R Casals (Australia) W Turnbull	6	4	6
(United States) ML Piatek (United States) W White	6	6
(United States) J Newberry (United Kingdom) V Wade	1	4
(Brazil) C Monteiro (South Africa) Y Vermaak	4	4
2	(United States) BJ King (United States) S Walsh	6	6

Quarterfinals
1	(South Africa) R Fairbank (United States) C Reynolds	6	7	3
(United States) Le Allen (United States) A Moulton	7	6	6
4	(United States) K Jordan (United States) B Potter	6	6
(United States) B Nagelsen (Romania) V Ruzici	0	0
(South Africa) I Kloss (United States) H Ludloff	3	6	3
(United States) B Jordan (Australia) E Sayers	6	2	6
(United States) ML Piatek (United States) W White	4	1
2	(United States) BJ King (United States) S Walsh	6	6

Semifinals
(United States) Le Allen (United States) A Moulton	2	1
4	(United States) K Jordan (United States) B Potter	6	6
(United States) B Jordan (Australia) E Sayers	3	3
2	(United States) BJ King (United States) S Walsh	6	6

Final
4	(United States) K Jordan (United States) B Potter	6	3	4
2	(United States) BJ King (United States) S Walsh	3	6	6
