= 1983 Edgbaston Cup =

- Date: 6–12 June
- Edition: 2nd
- Category: 2
- Draw: 56S / 32D
- Prize money: $100,000
- Surface: Grass / outdoor
- Location: Birmingham, United Kingdom
- Venue: Edgbaston Priory Club

Champions

Singles
- (United States) Billie Jean King

Doubles
- (United States) Billie Jean King / (United States) Sharon Walsh
← 1982 ·	Birmingham Classic	· 1984 →

The 1983 Edgbaston Cup was a women's tennis tournament played on outdoor grass courts that was part of the 1983 Virginia Slims World Championship Series. It was the second edition of the tournament. It took place at the Edgbaston Priory Club in Birmingham, United Kingdom, from 6 June until 12 June 1983. First-seeded Billie Jean King won the singles title.

== Finals ==
=== Singles ===
(United States) Billie Jean King defeated (United States) Alycia Moulton 6–0, 7–5

- It was King's second title of the year and the 129th of her career.

=== Doubles ===
(United States) Billie Jean King / (United States) Sharon Walsh defeated (United States) Beverly Mould / (Australia) Elizabeth Sayers 6–2, 6–4

- It was Walsh's 4th doubles title of the year and the 15th of her career.

== Entrants ==
=== Seeds ===
Athlete	Nationality	Seeding
Billie Jean King	United States	1
Zina Garrison	United States	2
Rosalyn Fairbank	South Africa	3
Evonne Cawley	Australia	4
Kathy Jordan	United States	5
Yvonne Vermaak	South Africa	6
Andrea Leand	United States	7
Wendy White	United States	8
Manuela Maleeva	Bulgaria	9
Ann Kiyomura	United States	10
Beth Herr	United States	11
N/A	N/A	12
Anne White	United States	13
N/A	N/A	14
Alycia Moulton	United States	15
Betty Stöve	Netherlands	16

=== Other entrants ===
The following players received entry from the qualifying draw:

- (United Kingdom) Cathy Drury
- (United States) Ann Henricksson
- (United States) Barbara Jordan
- (Australia) Anne Minter
- (Australia) Chris O'Neil
- (Australia) Brenda Remilton
- (United Kingdom) Julie Salmon
- (Australia) Elizabeth Sayers

The following players received a lucky loser spot:

- (Japan) Etsuko Inoue
- (United States) Kim Sands
