= 1983 U.S. Women's Indoor Championships =

Women's tennis tournament

- Date: September 26 – October 2
- Edition: 74th
- Category: Category 3
- Draw: 32S / 16D
- Prize money: $150,000
- Surface: Hard / indoor
- Location: Hartford, CT, U.S.
- Venue: Trinity College Civic Center

Champions

Singles
- (United States) Kim Shaefer

Doubles
- (United States) Billie Jean King / (United States) Sharon Walsh
- U.S. Women's Indoor Championships

The 1983 U.S. Women's Indoor Championships was a women's tennis tournament played on indoor hard courts at the Trinity College Civic Center in Hartford, Connecticut in the United States that was part of the Category 3 tier of the 1983 Virginia Slims World Championship Series. The tournament was held from September 26 through October 2, 1983. Unseeded Kim Shaefer defeated four seeded players to win the singles title and collect $30,000 first-prize money.

== Finals ==
=== Singles ===
(United States) Kimberly Shaefer defeated (West Germany) Sylvia Hanika 6–4, 6–3

- It was Shaefer's only singles career title.

=== Doubles ===
(United States) Billie Jean King / (United States) Sharon Walsh defeated (United States) Kathy Jordan / (United States) Barbara Potter 3–6, 6–3, 6–4

- It was King's 5th title of the year and the 169th of her career. It was Walsh's 6th title of the year and the 24th of her career.

== See also ==
- 1983 U.S. National Indoor Championships – men's tournament
