= 1984 Virginia Slims of California =

- Date: January 9–15
- Edition: 13th
- Draw: 32S / 16D
- Prize money: $150,000
- Surface: Carpet / indoor
- Location: Oakland, California, U.S.
- Venue: Oakland Coliseum Arena

Champions

Singles
- (Czechoslovakia) Hana Mandlíková

Doubles
- (United States) Martina Navratilova / (United States) Pam Shriver
- Virginia Slims of California

The 1984 Virginia Slims of California was a women's tennis tournament played on indoor carpet courts at the Oakland Coliseum Arena in Oakland, California in the United States that was part of the 1983 Virginia Slims World Championship Series (Note: The 1983 Virginia Slims World Championship Series ran from January 1983 through February 1984.). The tournament was held from January 9 through January 15, 1984. Eighth-seeded Hana Mandlíková won the singles title.

== Finals ==
=== Singles ===
(Czechoslovakia) Hana Mandlíková defeated (United States) Martina Navratilova 7–6^{(8–6)}, 3–6, 6–4

- It was Mandlíková's 2nd singles title of the year and the 18th of her career.

=== Doubles ===
(United States) Martina Navratilova / (United States) Pam Shriver defeated (United States) Rosie Casals / (United States) Alycia Moulton 6–2, 6–3

- It was Navratilova's 1st title of the year and the 93rd of her doubles career. It was Shriver's 1st title of the year and the 45th of her doubles career.

== Prize money ==
| Event | W | F | SF | QF | Round of 16 | Round of 32 |
| Singles | $30,000 | $15,000 | $7,350 | $3,600 | $1,900 | $1,100 |
