= 1984 US Indoors – Doubles =

Doubles
- 1984 US Indoors

Final
- Champions: (United States) Martina Navratilova (United States) Pam Shriver
- Runners-up: (United Kingdom) Jo Durie (United States) Ann Kiyomura
- Score: 6–4, 6–3

Details
- Draw: 16
- Seeds: 4

Events
Singles	Doubles
- U.S. Women's Indoor Championships

Billie Jean King and Sharon Walsh were the defending champions, but were forced to withdraw before their semifinals match against Jo Durie and Ann Kiyomura.

Martina Navratilova and Pam Shriver won the title by defeating Durie and Kiyomura 6–4, 6–3 in the final.

== Seeds ==
1. (United States) Martina Navratilova / (United States) Pam Shriver (champions)
2. (United States) Billie Jean King / (United States) Sharon Walsh (semifinals, withdrew)
3. (South Africa) Rosalyn Fairbank / (United States) Candy Reynolds (first round)
4. (United Kingdom) Jo Durie / (United States) Ann Kiyomura (final)

== Draw ==
Key

- Q = Qualifier
- WC = Wild card
- LL = Lucky loser
- Alt = Alternate
- ITF = ITF entry
- PR = Protected ranking
- SR = Special ranking
- SE = Special exempt
- JE = Junior exempt
- JR = Junior Accelerator Programme entrant
- CO = College Accelerator Programme entrant
- NG = Next Gen Accelerator Program entrant
- w/o = Walkover
- r = Retired
- d = Defaulted

=== Draw ===
First round
1	(United States) M Navratilova (United States) P Shriver	6	7
(United States) K Jordan (West Germany) E Pfaff	4	5
(United States) P Casale (United States) ML Piatek	5	6	6
(United States) L Antonoplis (Hungary) A Temesvári	7	4	7
3	(South Africa) R Fairbank (United States) C Reynolds	2	6	2
(Brazil) C Monteiro (South Africa) Y Vermaak	6	2	6
(United States) B Herr (United States) A Jaeger	4	6	2
(United States) R Casals (United States) J Russell	6	4	6
(United States) S Acker (Netherlands) M Mesker	7	6
(United States) Le Allen (United States) P Smith	6	4
(South Africa) B Mould (Australia) E Sayers	3	5
4	(United Kingdom) J Durie (United States) A Kiyomura	6	7
(Bulgaria) M Maleeva (Czechoslovakia) H Suková	1	6	3
(United States) B Gadusek (United States) W White	6	2	6
(United States) T Holladay (United Kingdom) V Wade	2	1
2	(United States) BJ King (United States) S Walsh	6	6

Quarterfinals
1	(United States) M Navratilova (United States) P Shriver	6	6
(United States) L Antonoplis (Hungary) A Temesvári	0	2
(Brazil) C Monteiro (South Africa) Y Vermaak	6	4	0
(United States) R Casals (United States) J Russell	4	6	6
(United States) S Acker (Netherlands) M Mesker	5	3
4	(United Kingdom) J Durie (United States) A Kiyomura	7	6
(United States) B Gadusek (United States) W White	3	3
2	(United States) BJ King (United States) S Walsh	6	6

Semifinals
1	(United States) M Navratilova (United States) P Shriver	6	6
(United States) R Casals (United States) J Russell	1	1
4	(United Kingdom) J Durie (United States) A Kiyomura	w/o
2	(United States) BJ King (United States) S Walsh

Final
1	(United States) M Navratilova (United States) P Shriver	6	6
4	(United Kingdom) J Durie (United States) A Kiyomura	4	3
