= 1983 U.S. Women's Indoor Championships – Singles =

Women's tennis tournament held in 1983

Singles
- 1983 U.S. Women's Indoor Championships

Final
- Champion: (United States) Kimberly Shaefer
- Runner-up: (West Germany) Sylvia Hanika
- Score: 6–4, 6–3

Details
- Draw: 32
- Seeds: 8

Events
Singles	Doubles
- U.S. Women's Indoor Championships

The 1983 U.S. Women's Indoor Championships singles was the singles event of the seventy-fourth edition of the U.S. Women's Indoor Championships; a tennis tournament held in Hartford, Connecticut, United States, played on indoor carpet. It was part of the 1983 season of the Virginia Slims World Championship Series, currently the WTA Tour.

Barbara Potter was the defending champion, but lost in the first round to Rosalyn Fairbank.

Kimberly Shaefer won the title by defeating Sylvia Hanika 6–4, 6–3 in the final.

== Seeds ==
1. (West Germany) Sylvia Hanika (final)
2. (United States) Pam Shriver (semifinals)
3. (Australia) Wendy Turnbull (semifinals)
4. (United States) Zina Garrison (quarterfinals)
5. (United States) Barbara Potter (first round)
6. (United States) Kathy Jordan (first round)
7. (Canada) Carling Bassett (quarterfinals)
8. (Romania) Virginia Ruzici (second round)

== Draw ==
Key

- Q = Qualifier
- WC = Wild card
- LL = Lucky loser
- Alt = Alternate
- ITF = ITF entry
- PR = Protected ranking
- SR = Special ranking
- SE = Special exempt
- JE = Junior exempt
- JR = Junior Accelerator Programme entrant
- CO = College Accelerator Programme entrant
- NG = Next Gen Accelerator Program entrant
- w/o = Walkover
- r = Retired
- d = Defaulted

=== Finals ===
Semifinals
1	(West Germany) Sylvia Hanika	6	6	6
3	(Australia) Wendy Turnbull	7	2	0
(United States) Kimberly Shaefer	6	3	6
2	(United States) Pam Shriver	2	6	0

Final
1	(West Germany) Sylvia Hanika	4	3
(United States) Kimberly Shaefer	6	6

=== Top half ===
First round
1	(West Germany) S Hanika	6	6
(Switzerland) L Drescher	3	1
(United States) F Raschiatore	6	6	1
(United States) P Casale	7	4	6
(United States) T Phelps	2	7	6
(United States) A White	6	5	1
(United States) W White	6	4
7	(Canada) C Bassett	7	6
3	(Australia) W Turnbull	6	6
(Brazil) C Monteiro	2	3
(United States) B Nagelsen	6	7
(United States) H Ludloff	3	6
(United States) B Herr	4	6	6
(Peru) L Arraya	6	1	3
(South Africa) R Fairbank	6	6
5	(United States) B Potter	4	4

Second round
1	(West Germany) S Hanika	6	1	6
(United States) P Casale	1	6	3
(United States) T Phelps	0	2
7	(Canada) C Bassett	6	6
3	(Australia) W Turnbull	7	6	6
(United States) B Nagelsen	6	7	2
(United States) B Herr	4	6
(South Africa) R Fairbank	6	7

Quarterfinals
1	(West Germany) S Hanika	6	4	6
7	(Canada) C Bassett	1	6	2
3	(Australia) W Turnbull	3	6	6
(South Africa) R Fairbank	6	0	0

Semifinals
1	(West Germany) S Hanika	6	6	6
3	(Australia) W Turnbull	7	2	0

=== Bottom half ===
First round
8	(Romania) V Ruzici	3	6	6
(Australia) A Minter	6	2	4
(United States) G Kim	2	4
(United States) K Shaefer	6	6
(Australia) E Sayers	3	6	3
(United States) A Moulton	6	1	6
(United States) R Casals	4	1
4	(United States) Z Garrison	6	6
6	(United States) K Jordan	5	4
(United States) Le Allen	7	6
(United States) ML Piatek	6	6	4
(United States) S Walsh	7	4	6
(United States) B Gerken	6	6	6
(South Africa) Y Vermaak	7	1	3
(United States) LA Thompson
2	(United States) P Shriver	w/o

Second round
8	(Romania) V Ruzici	6	3	2
(United States) K Shaefer	2	6	6
(United States) A Moulton	4	5
4	(United States) Z Garrison	6	7
(United States) Le Allen	6	7
(United States) S Walsh	4	6
(United States) B Gerken	5	1
2	(United States) P Shriver	7	6

Quarterfinals
(United States) K Shaefer	6	6
4	(United States) Z Garrison	3	0
(United States) Le Allen	6	1	3
2	(United States) P Shriver	4	6	6

Semifinals
(United States) K Shaefer	6	3	6
2	(United States) P Shriver	2	6	0
