= 1983 Virginia Slims Hall of Fame Classic – Singles =

Singles event for a tennis tournament held in 1983

Singles
- 1983 Virginia Slims Hall of Fame Classic

Final
- Champion: (United States) Alycia Moulton
- Runner-up: (United States) Kimberly Shaefer
- Score: 6–3, 6–2

Details
- Draw: 32 (4Q/1LL)
- Seeds: 8

Events
Singles	Doubles
- Virginia Slims of Newport

The 1983 Virginia Slims Hall of Fame Classic singles was the singles event of the fifth edition of the Virginia Slims of Newport; a tennis tournament held in Newport, Rhode Island, United States, played on grass. It was part of the 1983 season of the Virginia Slims World Championship Series, currently the WTA Tour.

No defending champions were declared, as the event went through an eight-year hiatus from 1975 to 1982. Chris Evert-Lloyd, the last tournament winner in 1974, chose not to compete this year.

Alycia Moulton won the title by defeating Kimberly Shaefer 6–3, 6–2 in the final.

== Seeds ==
1. (United States) Pam Shriver (semifinals)
2. (United States) Barbara Potter (second round)
3. (United States) Alycia Moulton (champion)
4. (United States) Andrea Leand (second round)
5. (United States) Leslie Allen (second round)
6. (United States) Rosie Casals (first round)
7. (United States) Louise Allen (quarterfinals)
8. (United States) Heather Ludloff (first round)

== Draw ==
Key

- Q = Qualifier
- WC = Wild card
- LL = Lucky loser
- Alt = Alternate
- ITF = ITF entry
- PR = Protected ranking
- SR = Special ranking
- SE = Special exempt
- JE = Junior exempt
- JR = Junior Accelerator Programme entrant
- CO = College Accelerator Programme entrant
- NG = Next Gen Accelerator Program entrant
- w/o = Walkover
- r = Retired
- d = Defaulted

=== Finals ===
Semifinals
1	(United States) Pam Shriver	3	6	3
3	(United States) Alycia Moulton	6	2	6
(United States) Terry Holladay	3	4
(United States) Kimberly Shaefer	6	6

Final
3	(United States) Alycia Moulton	6	6
(United States) Kimberly Shaefer	3	2

=== Top half ===
First round
1	(United States) P Shriver	6	6
(United States) S Rimes	0	0
(United States) T Lewis	6	6	2
Q	(United States) Robin Boss	4	7	6
(United States) L Forood	6	6
Q	(United States) C Copeland	2	4
(United States) K Steinmetz	3	4
7	(United States) Lo Allen	6	6
3	(United States) A Moulton	6	6
LL	(United States) Shelby Torrance	3	2
(United States) H Manset	4	4
(United States) S Margolin	6	6
(United States) J Ferestien	1	2
(United States) S Acker	6	6
(United States) R Blount	7	0	4
5	(United States) Le Allen	5	6	6

Second round
1	(United States) P Shriver	6	6
Q	(United States) R Boss	2	0
(United States) L Forood	6	3
7	(United States) Lo Allen	7	6
3	(United States) A Moulton	6	6
(United States) S Margolin	2	2
(United States) S Acker	2	6	6
5	(United States) Le Allen	6	3	4

Quarterfinals
1	(United States) P Shriver	6	6
7	(United States) Lo Allen	2	0
3	(United States) A Moulton	6	7
(United States) S Acker	3	5

Semifinals
1	(United States) P Shriver	3	6	3
3	(United States) A Moulton	6	2	6

=== Bottom half ===
First round
8	(United States) H Ludloff	4	6
(United States) J Forman	6	7
(United States) T Holladay	6	6
(United States) B Norton	4	4
Q	(United States) K Huebner	3	7	0
(United States) T Mochizuki	6	6	6
(United States) H Crowe	3	2
4	(United States) A Leand	6	6
6	(United States) R Casals	7	3	3
(Australia) E Sayers	5	6	6
Q	(United States) Mary-Ann Colville	3	2
(United States) K Schaefer	6	6
(Canada) K Dewis	5	1
(United States) AM Fernandez	7	6
(United States) B Jordan	3	4
2	(United States) B Potter	6	6

Second round
(United States) J Forman	3	5
(United States) T Holladay	6	7
(United States) T Mochizuki	6	6	7
4	(United States) A Leand	7	4	6
(Australia) E Sayers	5	7	1
(United States) K Schaefer	7	6	6
(United States) AM Fernandez	7	7
2	(United States) B Potter	6	6

Quarterfinals
(United States) T Holladay	6	6
(United States) T Mochizuki	4	2
(United States) K Schaefer	6	7	6
(United States) AM Fernandez	7	5	2

Semifinals
(United States) T Holladay	3	4
(United States) K Schaefer	6	6
