= 1983 Virginia Slims of Nashville =

- Date: February 28 – March 6
- Edition: 2nd
- Category: Ginny Tournament Circuit
- Draw: 32S / 16D
- Prize money: $50,000
- Location: Nashville, Tennessee, U.S.
- Venue: Maryland Farms Racquet Club

Champions

Singles
- (United States) Kathleen Horvath

Doubles
- (South Africa) Rosalyn Fairbank / (United States) Candy Reynolds
← 1973 ·	Virginia Slims of Nashville	· 1984 →

The 1983 Virginia Slims of Nashville was a women's tennis tournament played on outdoor hard courts at the Maryland Farms Racquet Club in Nashville, Tennessee in the United States that was part of the Ginny Series (Note: The 1983 Ginny Tournament Circuit consisted of eight $50,000 events played between February and September, followed by a $100,000 Ginny Championships in November. All tournaments were held in the United States.) of the 1983 Virginia Slims World Championship Series. The tournament was held from February 28 through March 6, 1983. Second-seeded Kathleen Horvath won the singles title.

== Finals ==
=== Singles ===
(United States) Kathleen Horvath defeated (Czechoslovakia) Marcela Skuherská 6–4, 6–3

- It was Horvath's 1st title of the year and the 2nd of her career.

=== Doubles ===
(South Africa) Rosalyn Fairbank / (United States) Candy Reynolds defeated (United States) Alycia Moulton / (United States) Paula Smith 6–4, 7–6

- It was Fairbank's 1st title of the year and the 4th of her career. It was Reynolds' 1st title of the year and the 9th of her career.
