= 1984 US Indoors =

Tennis tournament

- Date: February 20–26
- Edition: 75th
- Draw: 32S / 16D
- Prize money: $150,000
- Surface: Carpet / indoor
- Location: East Hanover, New Jersey, U.S.
- Venue: Four Seasons Racquet Club

Champions

Singles
- (United States) Martina Navratilova

Doubles
- (United States) Martina Navratilova / (United States) Pam Shriver
- U.S. Women's Indoor Championships

The 1984 US Indoors was a women's tennis tournament played on indoor carpet courts at the Four Seasons Racquet Club in Livingston, New Jersey in the United States that was part of the 1983 Virginia Slims World Championship Series (Note: The 1983 Virginia Slims World Championship Series ran from January 1983 through February 1984.). The tournament was held from February 20 through February 26, 1984. First-seeded Martina Navratilova won the singles title.

== Finals ==
=== Singles ===
(United States) Martina Navratilova defeated (United States) Chris Evert 6–2, 7–6^{(7–4)}

- It was Navratilova's 1st singles title of the year and the 87th of her career.

=== Doubles ===
(United States) Martina Navratilova / (United States) Pam Shriver defeated (United Kingdom) Jo Durie / (United States) Ann Kiyomura 6–4, 6–3

- It was Navratilova's 2nd title of the year and the 181st of her career. It was Shriver's 3rd title of the year and the 46th of her career.

== See also ==
- Evert–Navratilova rivalry
