= 1984 Virginia Slims of California – Doubles =

Doubles
- 1984 Virginia Slims of California

Final
- Champions: (United States) Martina Navratilova (United States) Pam Shriver
- Runners-up: (United States) Rosie Casals (United States) Alycia Moulton
- Score: 6–2, 6–3

Details
- Draw: 16
- Seeds: 4

Events
Singles	Doubles
- Silicon Valley Classic

Claudia Kohde-Kilsch and Eva Pfaff were the defending champions, but competed this year with different partners. Kohde-Kilsch teamed up with Christiane Jolissaint and lost in the first round to Hana Mandlíková and Helena Suková, while Pfaff teamed up with Bettina Bunge and lost in the semifinals to Rosie Casals and Alycia Moulton.

Martina Navratilova and Pam Shriver won the title by defeating Casals and Moulton 6–2, 6–3 in the final.

== Seeds ==
1. (United States) Martina Navratilova / (United States) Pam Shriver (champions)
2. (United States) Billie Jean King / (United States) Sharon Walsh (first round)
3. (United Kingdom) Anne Hobbs / (Australia) Wendy Turnbull (semifinals)
4. (United States) Bonnie Gadusek / (United States) Wendy White (first round)

== Draw ==
Key

- Q = Qualifier
- WC = Wild card
- LL = Lucky loser
- Alt = Alternate
- ITF = ITF entry
- PR = Protected ranking
- SR = Special ranking
- SE = Special exempt
- JE = Junior exempt
- JR = Junior Accelerator Programme entrant
- CO = College Accelerator Programme entrant
- NG = Next Gen Accelerator Program entrant
- w/o = Walkover
- r = Retired
- d = Defaulted

=== Draw ===
First round
1	(United States) M Navratilova (United States) P Shriver	6	6
(United States) P Teeguarden (South Africa) Y Vermaak	1	4
(Czechoslovakia) H Mandlíková (Czechoslovakia) H Suková	6	7
(Switzerland) C Jolissaint (West Germany) C Kohde-Kilsch	1	6
(United States) E Burgin (United States) J Russell	3	6
(United States) Lo Allen (United States) A Smith	6	7
(United States) Le Allen (United States) A White	4	2
3	(United Kingdom) A Hobbs (Australia) W Turnbull	6	6
4	(United States) B Gadusek (United States) W White	6	1
(West Germany) B Bunge (West Germany) E Pfaff	7	6
(United States) L Bonder (United States) A Jaeger	5	3
(United States) K Rinaldi (Romania) V Ruzici	7	6
(United States) R Casals (United States) A Moulton	6	7
(South Africa) I Kloss (United States) H Ludloff	3	5
(United States) S Collins (United States) K Horvath	6	3	6
2	(United States) BJ King (United States) S Walsh	0	6	4

Quarterfinals
1	(United States) M Navratilova (United States) P Shriver	6	6
(Czechoslovakia) H Mandlíková (Czechoslovakia) H Suková	3	1
(United States) Lo Allen (United States) A Smith	3	1
3	(United Kingdom) A Hobbs (Australia) W Turnbull	6	6
(West Germany) B Bunge (West Germany) E Pfaff	6	6
(United States) K Rinaldi (Romania) V Ruzici	1	2
(United States) R Casals (United States) A Moulton	6	6
(United States) S Collins (United States) K Horvath	4	4

Semifinals
1	(United States) M Navratilova (United States) P Shriver	6	3	7
3	(United Kingdom) A Hobbs (Australia) W Turnbull	2	6	5
(West Germany) B Bunge (West Germany) E Pfaff	6	3	2
(United States) R Casals (United States) A Moulton	4	6	6

Final
1	(United States) M Navratilova (United States) P Shriver	6	6
(United States) R Casals (United States) A Moulton	2	3
