= 1983 BMW Championships =

- Date: 13–19 June
- Edition: 10th
- Category: Virginia Slims World Championship Series
- Draw: 64S / 32D
- Prize money: $150,000
- Surface: Grass
- Location: Eastbourne, United Kingdom
- Venue: Devonshire Park

Champions

Singles
- (United States) Martina Navratilova

Doubles
- (United States) Martina Navratilova / (United States) Pam Shriver
- Eastbourne International

The 1983 BMW Championships was a women's tennis tournament played on outdoor grass courts at Devonshire Park in Eastbourne in the United Kingdom that was part of the 1983 Virginia Slims World Championship Series. The tournament was held from 13 June through 19 June 1983. First-seeded Martina Navratilova won the singles title and earned $23,000 first-prize money.

== Finals ==
=== Singles ===
(United States) Martina Navratilova defeated (Australia) Wendy Turnbull 6–1, 6–1

- It was Navratilova's 8th singles title of the year and the 78th of her career.

=== Doubles ===
(United States) Martina Navratilova / (United States) Pam Shriver defeated (United Kingdom) Jo Durie / (United Kingdom) Anne Hobbs 6–1, 6–0

- It was Navratilova's 14th title of the year and the 166th of her career. It was Shriver's 1st title of the year and the 41st of her career.

== Prize money ==
Event	W	F	SF	QF	Round of 16	Round of 32	Prel. round
Singles	$23,000	$12,000	$6,100	$3,100	$1,600	$825	$450
