= 1983 Virginia Slims of Los Angeles =

- Date: August 8–14
- Edition: 10th
- Draw: 56S / 32D
- Prize money: $150,000
- Surface: Hard / outdoor
- Location: Manhattan Beach, CA, U.S.
- Venue: Manhattan Country Club

Champions

Singles
- (United States) Martina Navratilova

Doubles
- (United States) Martina Navratilova / (United States) Pam Shriver
- Virginia Slims of Los Angeles

The 1983 Virginia Slims of Los Angeles was a women's tennis tournament played on outdoor hard courts at the Manhattan Country Club in Manhattan Beach, California in the United States that was part of the 1983 Virginia Slims World Championship Series. The tournament was held from August 8 through August 14, 1983. First-seeded Martina Navratilova won the singles title and earned $27,5000 first-prize money.

== Finals ==
=== Singles ===
(United States) Martina Navratilova defeated (United States) Chris Evert-Lloyd 6–1, 6–3

- It was Navratilova's 10th singles title of the year and the 80th of her career.

=== Doubles ===
(United States) Martina Navratilova / (United States) Pam Shriver defeated (United States) Betsy Nagelsen / (Romania) Virginia Ruzici 6–1, 6–0

- It was Shriver's 10th title of the year and the 44th of her career.

== Prize money ==
Event	W	F	SF	QF	Round of 16	Round of 32	Prel. round
Singles	$27,500	$14,000	$7,150	$3,300	$1,600	$800	$400

== See also ==
- Evert–Navratilova rivalry
