= 1983 U.S. National Indoor Championships =

- Date: February 14–20
- Edition: 13th
- Category: Grand Prix
- Draw: 48S / 24D
- Prize money: $250,000
- Surface: Carpet / indoor
- Location: Memphis, Tennessee, U.S.
- Venue: Racquet Club of Memphis

Champions

Singles
- (United States) Jimmy Connors

Doubles
- (Australia) Peter McNamara / (Australia) Paul McNamee
- U.S. National Indoor Championships

The 1983 U.S. National Indoor Championships was a men's tennis tournament played on indoor carpet courts that was part of the 1983 Volvo Grand Prix.It was the 13th edition of the tournament and was played at the Racquet Club of Memphis in Memphis, Tennessee in the United States from February 14 through February 20, 1983. First-seeded Jimmy Connors won the singles title, his sixth at the event, improving the record he held jointly with Wylie C. Grant.

== Finals ==
=== Singles ===
(United States) Jimmy Connors defeated (United States) Gene Mayer 7–5, 6–0

- It was Connors' 1st singles title of the year and the 97th of his career.

=== Doubles ===
(Australia) Peter McNamara / (Australia) Paul McNamee defeated (United States) Tim Gullikson / (United States) Tom Gullikson 6–3, 5–7, 6–4

== See also ==
- 1983 U.S. Women's Indoor Championships – women's tournament
