= 1984 Virginia Slims of Nashville =

- Date: January 2–8
- Edition: 3rd
- Draw: 32S / 16D
- Prize money: $50,000
- Surface: Hard / indoor
- Location: Nashville, US

Champions

Singles
- (United States) Jenny Klitch

Doubles
- (United States) Sherry Acker / (United States) Candy Reynolds
← 1983 ·	Virginia Slims of Nashville	· 1988 →

The 1984 Virginia Slims of Nashville was a women's tennis tournament played on indoor hard courts in Nashville, Tennessee in the United States that was part of the 1983 Virginia Slims World Championship Series. The tournament was held from January 2 through January 8, 1984. Unseeded Jenny Klitch won the singles title.

== Finals ==
=== Singles ===
(United States) Jenny Klitch defeated (United States) Pam Teeguarden 6–2, 6–1

- It was Klitch's only career title.

=== Doubles ===
(United States) Sherry Acker / (United States) Candy Reynolds defeated (United States) Mary Lou Piatek / (United States) Paula Smith 5–7, 7–6, 7–6

- It was Acker's only career title. It was Reynolds' 1st title of the year and the 18th of her career.
