= 1982 Edgbaston Cup =

- Date: 7–13 June
- Edition: 1st
- Category: Toyota Series
- Draw: 56S / 32D
- Prize money: $100,000
- Surface: Grass / outdoor
- Location: Birmingham, United Kingdom
- Venue: Edgbaston Priory Club

Champions

Singles
- (United States) Billie Jean King

Doubles
- (United Kingdom) Jo Durie / (United Kingdom) Anne Hobbs
Birmingham Classic	· 1983 →

The 1982 Edgbaston Cup was a women's tennis tournament played on outdoor grass courts that was part of the Toyota Series of the 1982 WTA Tour. It was the inaugural edition of the event and took place at the Edgbaston Priory Club in Birmingham, United Kingdom, from 7 June until 13 June 1982. Fourth-seeded Billie Jean King won the singles title, her first after the Toray Sillook Open in September 1980.

== Finals ==
=== Singles ===
(United States) Billie Jean King defeated (South Africa) Rosalyn Fairbank 6–2, 6–1

- It was King's first singles title of the year and the 127th of her career.

=== Doubles ===
(United Kingdom) Jo Durie / (United Kingdom) Anne Hobbs defeated (United States) Rosie Casals / (Australia) Wendy Turnbull 6–3, 6–2

- It was Durie's first doubles title of the year and of her career. It was also Hobbs' first doubles title of the year and of her career.

== Prize money ==
Event	W	F	SF	QF	Round of 16	Round of 32	Round of 64
Singles	$18,000	$9,000	$4,650	$2,200	$1,100	$550	$275

== Entrants ==
=== Seeds ===
Athlete	Nationality	Seeding
Tracy Austin	United States	1
Sylvia Hanika	West Germany	2
Barbara Potter	United States	3
Billie Jean King	United States	4
Sue Barker	Great Britain	5
Kathy Jordan	United States	6
Betsy Nagelsen	United States	7
Ann Kiyomura	United States	8
Leslie Allen	United States	9
Jo Durie	Great Britain	10
Yvonne Vermaak	South Africa	11
Wendy White	United States	12
Sharon Walsh	United States	13
Evonne Cawley	Australia	14

=== Other entrants ===
The following players received entry from the qualifying draw:

- (United States) Renee Blount
- (United States) Lele Forood
- (United States) Trey Lewis
- (United States) Nancy Neviaser
- (Australia) Elizabeth Sayers
- (United States) Kim Steinmetz
- (Australia) Amanda Tobin
- (Australia) Pam Whytcross
