= Ridgewood Open =

American women's tennis tournament

Defunct tennis tournament
- Event name: Ridgewood Open (1983)
- Tour: WTA Tour (1983)
- Founded: 1983
- Abolished: 1983
- Editions: 1
- Surface: Carpet (1983)

The Ridgewood Open is a defunct WTA Tour affiliated women's tennis tournament played in 1983. It was held in Ridgewood, New Jersey in the United States and played on indoor carpet courts.

== Results ==
=== Singles ===
Year	Champions	Runners-up	Score
1983	(United States) Alycia Moulton	(Sweden) Catrin Jexell	6–4, 6–2

=== Doubles ===
Year	Champions	Runners-up	Score
1983	(South Africa) Beverly Mould (Australia) Elizabeth Sayers	(South Africa) Rosalyn Fairbank (Australia) Susan Leo	7–6, 4–6, 7–5
