= Kathleen Cummings =

American tennis player

- Country (sports): United States
- Born: September 5, 1961 (age 65) Catonsville, Maryland, US
- Height: 5 ft 5 in (1.65 m)
- Plays: Right-handed (two-handed backhanded)
- Prize money: $59,928

Grand Slam singles results
- French Open: 1R (1985)
- Wimbledon: 2R (1985)
- US Open: 3R (1983)

Grand Slam doubles results
- Wimbledon: 1R (1984)

Kathleen Cummings (born September 5, 1961) is a retired American professional tennis player.

== Biography ==
Cummings, who comes from Richmond, Virginia, was a three-time All-American tennis player at the University of Colorado. She made the semi-finals of the AIAW Championships in 1982 and transferred to the University of Texas for the final year of her college career, winning the 1984 Southwest Conference singles title.

While still in college, Cummings began playing on the professional circuit as an amateur and had her breakthrough when she upset Virginia Wade at the 1981 Avon Championships of Seattle. At the 1983 US Open, Cummings had wins over Lee Duk-hee and Mary-Lou Piatek to make the third round, where she lost to eighth seed Hana Mandlíková. In 1984 she had her best year on the circuit, with semi-final appearances at Virginia Slims tournaments in Nashville and Richmond, as well as the semi-finals in Salt Lake City. She graduated from college in 1984 and continued to play on tour until 1986.

She now works as a nurse in the Richmond area. She has one son, Bogue Cummings, born 7/10/2000 who graduated from Randolph Macon College in 5/2024 after playing collegiate soccer for them.
