= Catrin Jexell =

Swedish tennis player

- Country (sports): Sweden
- Born: 17 February 1963 (age 62)
- Retired: 1991
- Prize money: $97,044

Singles
- Career record: 60–36
- Career titles: 1 WTA, 3 ITF

Grand Slam singles results
- French Open: 3R (1984)
- Wimbledon: 1R (1983, 1984, 1985)
- US Open: 1R (1983, 1984)

Doubles
- Career record: 33–18
- Career titles: 3 ITF

Grand Slam doubles results
- French Open: 2R (1985)
- Wimbledon: 1R (1984)
- US Open: 1R (1983, 1984)

Catrin Jexell (born 17 February 1963) is a former professional tennis player from Sweden.

== Biography ==
Originally from Halmstad, Jexell played professionally in the 1980s. She first competed for the Sweden Fed Cup team in 1982 and featured in a total of seven ties. Her only WTA title came at the 1982 Hong Kong Open. In 1983 she was runner-up at Ridgewood and had a win over Hana Mandlikova at Filderstadt. She made the third round of the 1984 French Open.

== WTA Tour finals ==
=== Singles (1-1) ===
Result	W/L	Date	Tournament	Category	Surface	Opponent	Score
Win	1–0	Nov 1982	Hong Kong	Category 1	Hard	(United States) Alycia Moulton	6–3, 7–5
Loss	1–1	Feb 1983	Ridgewood, U.S.	Category 1+	Carpet	(United States) Alycia Moulton	4–6, 2–6

=== Doubles (0-1) ===
Result	W/L	Date	Tournament	Category	Surface	Partner	Opponents	Score
Loss	0–1	May 1982	Ciampino, Italy	Category 1	Clay	(Argentina) Susana Villaverde	(United Kingdom) Elizabeth Jones (United Kingdom) Debbie Jevans	6–7, 2–6

== ITF finals ==
Legend
$25,000 tournaments
$10,000 tournaments

=== Singles (3–2) ===
Result	No.	Date	Tournament	Surface	Opponent	Score
Win	1.	14 April 1986	Cumberland, United Kingdom	Hard	(United Kingdom) Jane Wood	6–4, 6–2
Loss	1.	7 July 1986	Båstad, Sweden	Clay	(Sweden) Catarina Lindqvist	2–6, 0–6
Loss	2.	10 August 1986	Chatham, United States	Hard	(Mexico) Heliane Steden	3–6, 4–6
Win	2.	19 January 1987	Stockholm, Sweden	Carpet	(Czechoslovakia) Jana Pospíšilová	6–3, 6–1
Win	3.	30 November 1987	Budapest, Hungary	Clay	(Sweden) Cecilia Dahlman	6–2, 6–2

=== Doubles (3–1) ===
Result	No.	Date	Tournament	Surface	Partner	Opponents	Score
Loss	1.	27 April 1986	Hatfield, United Kingdom	Hard	(Sweden) Helena Olsson	(South Africa) Monica Reinach (United Kingdom) Joy Tacon	1–6, 7–5, 3–6
Win	1.	19 January 1987	Stockholm, Sweden	Carpet	(Sweden) Helena Olsson	(Sweden) Maria Strandlund (Sweden) Jonna Jonerup	6–2, 6–3
Win	2.	26 January 1987	Stavanger, Norway	Carpet	(Sweden) Lena Sandin	(Czechoslovakia) Denisa Krajčovičová (Czechoslovakia) Radka Zrubáková	3–6, 6–1, 6–1
Win	3.	30 November 1987	Budapest, Hungary	Clay	(Sweden) Monica Lundqvist	(Hungary) Petra Schmitt (West Germany) Caroline Schneider	6–3, 6–2
