= Marcela Skuherská =

Czech tennis player (born 1961)

- Full name: Marcela Skuherská-Davidová
- Country (sports): Czechoslovakia
- Born: 14 February 1961 (age 64); Přerov, Czechoslovakia
- Prize money: $148,841

Singles
- Career record: 22–36

Grand Slam singles results
- Australian Open: 1R (1983)
- French Open: 2R (1982, 1984)
- Wimbledon: 3R (1984)
- US Open: 2R (1983, 1984)

Doubles
- Career record: 26–34
- Career titles: 1 WTA
- Highest ranking: No. 45 (30 March 1987)

Grand Slam doubles results
- Australian Open: 1R (1983)
- French Open: 3R (1986)
- Wimbledon: 2R (1983, 1985)
- US Open: 2R (1982, 83, 84, 85, 86)

Marcela Skuherská-Davidová (born 14 February 1961) is a former professional tennis player who represented Czechoslovakia.

== Biography ==
Skuherská, who was born in Přerov, played on the professional circuit in the 1980s.

She was a member of the Czechoslovak Fed Cup team in 1983 and 1984, which won the competition both years. All six of her Fed Cup appearances came partnering Iva Budařová in doubles, including the final against West Germany in 1983. In 1984 the pair played in both the quarter-final and semi-final, but stood aside for Hana Mandlíková and Helena Suková in the final.

On the WTA Tour, her best performances in singles included making the final at Nashville in 1983 and reaching the third round of the 1984 Wimbledon Championships. She was more successful in doubles, with her three WTA finals including one title, at Hershey in 1984.

At the 1986 Goodwill Games she and doubles partner Iva Budařová won a silver medal in the women's doubles.

She is married to Czech singer Michal David.

== WTA Tour finals ==
=== Singles (0-1) ===
Result	Date	Tournament	Tier	Surface	Opponent	Score
Loss	Mar 1983	Nashville, TN, United States	$50,000	Hard	(United States) Kathleen Horvath	4–6, 3–6

=== Doubles (1-2) ===
Result	Date	Tournament	Tier	Surface	Partner	Opponents	Score
Win	Jan 1984	Hershey, PA, United States	$50,000	Carpet	(Czechoslovakia) Kateřina Böhmová	(United States) Ann Henricksson (United States) Nancy Yeargin	6–1, 6–3
Loss	May 1984	Lugano, Switzerland	$100,000	Clay	(Czechoslovakia) Iva Budařová	(Switzerland) Christiane Jolissaint (Netherlands) Marcella Mesker	1–6, 2–6
Loss	Apr 1986	Wild Dunes, SC, United States	$75,000	Clay	(Peru) Laura Gildemeister	(Italy) Sandra Cecchini (Socialist Federal Republic of Yugoslavia) Sabrina Goleš	6–4, 0–6, 3–6
