= Jenny Klitch =

American tennis player (born 1965)

- Full name: Jenny L. Klitch
- Country (sports): United States
- Born: April 19, 1965 (age 60)
- Plays: Right-handed
- Prize money: $127,496

Singles
- Career record: 37–71
- Career titles: 1 WTA

Grand Slam singles results
- French Open: 3R (1984)
- Wimbledon: 2R (1984)
- US Open: 2R (1984)

Doubles
- Career record: 3–20

Grand Slam doubles results
- French Open: 1R (1983, 1984)
- Wimbledon: 1R (1983, 1984, 1985)
- US Open: 2R (1983)

Jenny L. Klitch (born April 19, 1965) is a former professional tennis player from the United States.

== Biography ==
Klitch, who grew up in Columbus, Ohio, played on the professional tour in the 1980s. She won one WTA Tour title, the Virginia Slims of Nashville in 1984. Other highlights include making the third round of the 1984 French Open and a win over Helena Suková at the 1984 U.S. Clay Court Championships.

Now working as a lawyer, Klitch is based in Palm Beach County, Florida.

Like many former Tennis players, Klitch pivoted to competitive Pickleball in 2020, as the sport exploded in popularity in the United States. In August 2021, Klitch was named the Commissioner of the newly created Major League Pickleball league. She served in that capacity from MLP's creation until September 2022. In September 2022, Klitch was named Senior Vice President, Pro Player Relations and Competition for the Association of Pickleball Players (APP) tour. She served in that capacity, working with the APP's pro tour for more than two years, and stepped down from the APP at the end of 2024.

== WTA Tour finals ==
=== Singles (1-1) ===
Result	Date	Tournament	Tier	Surface	Opponent	Score
Win	Jan 1984	Nashville, U.S.	Category 1+	Hard	(United States) Pam Teeguarden	6–2, 6–1
Loss	Dec 1986	São Paulo, Brazil	Category 1	Clay	(United States) Vicki Nelson-Dunbar	2–6, 6–7^{(1–7)}
