= Nancy Yeargin =

American tennis player

- Full name: Nancy Yeargin Furman
- Country (sports): United States
- Born: 22 May 1955 (age 70) Greenville, SC, U.S.
- Turned pro: 1977
- Retired: 1984
- Plays: Right-handed
- Prize money: US$ 64,527

Singles
- Career record: 0–2
- Career titles: 0
- Highest ranking: No. 53

Grand Slam singles results
- Australian Open: 2R (1981)
- French Open: 1R (1983)
- Wimbledon: 2R (1982, 1983)
- US Open: 3R (1982)

Doubles
- Career record: 0–3
- Career titles: 0

Grand Slam doubles results
- Australian Open: 2R (1982)
- Wimbledon: 3R (1979, 1982)

Grand Slam mixed doubles results
- Wimbledon: 2R (1983)

Nancy Yeargin (born 22 May 1955) is an American former tennis player who was active during the 1970s and 1980s.

During her career Yeargin played in all four Grand Slam tournaments. Her best result in the singles came in 1982, when she reached the third round at the US Open. At Wimbledon she reached the second round in 1982 and 1983. Her best doubles result was reaching the third round at Wimbledon In 1979 and 1982. At the Australian Open she reached the second round in the singles (1981) and doubles (1982).

Yeargin reached the quarterfinals at the 1982 Edgbaston Cup after victories over Amanda Tobin, Sylvia Hanika and Barbara Hallquist. At the 1984 Virginia Slims of Pennsylvania, part of the 1983 Virginia Slims World Championship Series, she partnered Ann Henricksson to reach the final of the doubles event.

Yeargin was elected to the Women's International Tennis Association (WITA, now WTA) board of directors and served from 1982 through 1986 during which time she was chairperson of the tournament committee. In 1982, she was voted the winner of the Karen Krantzcke Sportsmanship Award in 1982.

After her retirement from the WTA Tour in 1984 she became a professional coach at the Greenville Country Club.

== Career finals ==
=== Doubles (1 runner-up) ===
Result	W-L	Date	Tournament	Surface	Partner	Opponents	Score
Loss	0–1	Jan 1984	Hershey, United States	Carpet	(United States) Ann Henricksson	(Czechoslovakia) Kateřina Böhmová (Czechoslovakia) Marcela Skuherská	1–6, 3–6
