= Kimberly Jones (tennis) =

American tennis player

Kim Jones
- Country (sports): United States
- Born: September 28, 1957 (age 68) Columbus, Georgia, United States
- Turned pro: 1979
- Retired: 1987
- Plays: Right-handed
- Prize money: $232,880

Singles
- Career record: 59–101
- Career titles: 1
- Highest ranking: No. 25 ( March 19, 1984)

Grand Slam singles results
- Australian Open: 2R (1983, 1984)
- French Open: 2R (1981)
- Wimbledon: 2R (1982)
- US Open: 3R (1983)

Doubles
- Career record: 47–104
- Career titles: 0

Grand Slam doubles results
- Australian Open: QF (1984)
- French Open: 2R (1980, 1984)
- Wimbledon: 3R (1980, 1982)
- US Open: 2R (1980, 1981, 1983, 1984)

Grand Slam mixed doubles results
- US Open: SF (1983)

Kimberly Jones (born September 28, 1957) is a retired American professional tennis player. She is also known by her married name, Kimberly Shaefer.

== Career ==
Jones was a two-time NCAA All-American at San Diego State in 1977 and 1978. She turned professional in 1979 and joined the WTA Tour. In 1983, she won the US Indoor Championships and was runner-up at the Virginia Slims Hall of Fame Classic. She reached a career high ranking of #25 on March 19, 1984. She posted career victories over Pam Shriver, Zina Garrison, and Sylvia Hanika. She retired in 1987. She was the head tennis coach at the University of Cincinnati from 2003 to 2008.

Jones played three seasons of World Team Tennis from 1983 through 1985. She served as vice president of the WTA in 1984-85 and served on the board for four years.

== WTA career finals ==
=== Singles: 2 (1-1) ===
Winner — Legend Grand Slam tournaments (0–0) WTA Tour Championships (0–0) Virginia Slims (1–1)	Titles by surface Hard (0–0) Grass (0–1) Clay (0–0) Carpet (1–0)

Result	W/L	Date	Tournament	Surface	Opponent	Score
Loss	0–1	Jul 1983	Virginia Slims of Newport, U.S.	Grass	(United States) Alycia Moulton	3–6, 2–6
Win	1–1	Sep 1983	U.S. Women's Indoor Championships, U.S.	Carpet (i)	(West Germany) Sylvia Hanika	6–4, 6–3
