= Sherry Acker =

American tennis player (born 1959)

- Country (sports): US
- Born: June 6, 1959 (age 67) Kalamazoo, U.S.
- Height: 5 ft 8 in (1.73 m)
- Turned pro: 1978
- Plays: Right-handed
- Prize money: US$ 210,614

Singles
- Career record: 56–93
- Career titles: 0
- Highest ranking: 27 (31 December 1980)

Grand Slam singles results
- Australian Open: 1R (1981, 1982, 1983)
- French Open: 2R (1979)
- Wimbledon: 3R (1980, 1981)
- US Open: 4R (1979)

Doubles
- Career record: 94–106
- Career titles: 1

Grand Slam doubles results
- Australian Open: 2R (1981, 1983)
- French Open: QF (1979)
- Wimbledon: QF (1981)
- US Open: SF (1979)

Grand Slam mixed doubles results
- French Open: 2R (1979)
- Wimbledon: SF (1981)
- US Open: QF (1983)

Sherry Acker (born June 6, 1959) is a former American tennis player who was active in the late 1970s and first half of the 1980s.

Acker was taught tennis by her father who was the coach at Kalamazoo College. In 1971, she won the girls' national singles and doubles title for 12-year-olds. She attended Kalamazoo Central High School and played on the varsity boys' tennis team. She attended the University of Florida and turned pro in 1978.

In the doubles competition, her best result at a Grand Slam was reaching the semifinals at the 1979 US Open with Julie Anthony, losing to Billie Jean King and Martina Navratilova. At the same tournament, she reached the fourth round of the singles event in which she was beaten in three sets by top-seed Chris Evert. In the mixed doubles, partnering Larry Leeds, she reached the semifinals of the 1981 Wimbledon Championships, losing to second-seeds and eventual champions Betty Stöve and Frew McMillan.

In 1980, she reached the final of the singles event at the Women's Stuttgart Open as an unseeded player, losing in straight sets to top-seed and defending champion Tracy Austin.

== WTA Tour finals ==
=== Singles (1 runner-up) ===
Result	W/L	Date	Tournament	Surface	Opponent	Score
Loss	0–1	Nov 1980	Filderstadt, West Germany	Carpet (i)	(United States) Tracy Austin	2–6, 5–7

=== Doubles (1 title, 2 runners-up) ===
Result	W/L	Date	Tournament	Surface	Partner	Opponents	Score
Loss	0–1	Feb 1983	Philadelphia, US	Hard	(United States) Ann Henricksson	(United States) Lea Antonoplis (United States) Barbara Jordan	3–6, 4–6
Win	1–1	Jan 1984	Nashville, US	Hard	(United States) Candy Reynolds	(United States) Mary-Lou Daniels (United States) Paula Smith	5–7, 7–6, 7–6
Loss	1–2	Jan 1984	Denver, US	Hard	(United States) Candy Reynolds	(United Kingdom) Anne Hobbs (Netherlands) Marcella Mesker	2–6, 3–6
