= Alycia Moulton =

American tennis player

Alycia Ann Moulton
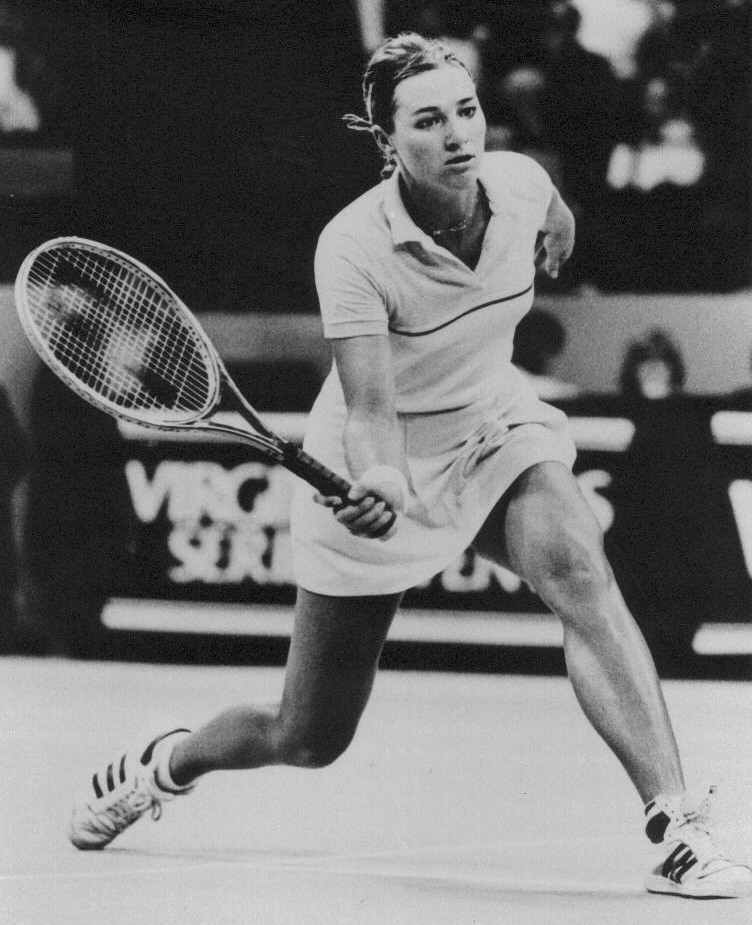
- Moulton playing in 1983
- Country (sports): United States
- Born: February 18, 1961 (age 65) Sacramento, California
- Turned pro: 1982
- Retired: 1988
- Plays: Right-handed
- Prize money: $468,748

Singles
- Career record: 134–124
- Career titles: 2
- Highest ranking: No. 18 (November 26, 1984)

Grand Slam singles results
- Australian Open: 4R (1983)
- French Open: 2R (1983)
- Wimbledon: 3R (1985, 1987)
- US Open: 4R (1985)

Doubles
- Career record: 147–114
- Career titles: 6
- Highest ranking: No. 28 (May 25, 1987)

Grand Slam doubles results
- Australian Open: QF (1983, 1985)
- French Open: QF (1983, 1986)
- Wimbledon: QF (1982)
- US Open: QF (1984)

Alycia Moulton (born February 18, 1961) is a retired American tennis player.

== Career ==
Moulton won the U.S. Junior Championships in 1979 and was runner-up at the Wimbledon Junior Championships in 1979. She was active on the professional tour from 1978 to 1988. Her powerful game brought her two singles titles in 1983 and five doubles titles. She reached a career-high ranking of 18 in singles in November 1984, and won the Ridgewood Open and the Virginia Slims of Newport, Rhode Island.

Moulton achieved immediate success on the WTA Tour after graduating from Stanford University, where as team captain and four-time All-American, she was an NCAA singles, doubles and team champion. She was selected to represent the United States in Wightman Cup, and played doubles with Chris Evert, defeating Great Britain in that competition.

Moulton served two terms on the board of directors of the Women's Tennis Association. She has been inducted into the Sacramento Hall of Fame, the Stanford University Hall of Fame and the Northern California Tennis Hall of Fame.

== Personal life ==
Moulton was born in Sacramento. Her father, Lee Moulton, is an inventor and engineer born in 1923. Her mother, Eleanor Moulton is a small business owner born in 1932. Alycia has one brother, Gregory Moulton, a computer scientist and founder of Avamar Technologies. After her tennis career, Moulton started a real estate development company. This led her to attend UC Davis School of Law. After graduating she was married briefly to George Artz, a computer scientist and lifelong friend. Moulton worked for Congressman and former California State Senator, Mike Thompson. She is a real estate attorney and now resides in Menlo Park, California.

== WTA Tour finals ==
=== Singles: 5 (2 titles, 3 runner-ups) ===
Legend Grand Slam tournaments (0–0) WTA Tour Championships (0–0) Virginia Slims, Avon, other (2–3)	Finals by surface Hard (0–1) Grass (1–1) Clay (0–1) Carpet (1–0)

Result	W-L	Date	Tournament	Surface	Opponent	Score
Loss	0–1	Nov 1982	Hong Kong Open	Clay	(Sweden) Catrin Jexell	3–6, 5–7
Win	1–1	Feb 1983	Ridgewood Open, U.S.	Carpet (i)	(Sweden) Catrin Jexell	6–4, 6–2
Loss	1–2	Jun 1983	Birmingham Classic, UK	Grass	(United States) Billie Jean King	0–6, 5–7
Win	2–2	Jul 1983	Virginia Slims of Newport, U.S.	Grass	(United States) Kimberly Shaefer	6–3, 6–2
Loss	2–3	Aug 1984	Canadian Open	Hard	(United States) Chris Evert-Lloyd	2–6, 6–7^{(3–7)}

=== Doubles: 11 (6 titles, 5 runner-ups) ===
Legend Grand Slam tournaments (0–0) WTA Tour Championships (0–0) Virginia Slims, Avon, other (6–5)	Finals by surface Hard (3–1) Grass (1–1) Clay (1–0) Carpet (1–3)

Result	W-L	Date	Tournament	Surface	Partner	Opponents	Score
Win	1–0	Nov 1982	Hong Kong Open	Clay	(United States) Laura duPont	(South Africa) Jennifer Mundel (South Africa) Yvonne Vermaak	6–2, 4–6, 7–5
Loss	1–1	Feb 1983	VS Nashville, U.S.	Carpet	(United States) Paula Smith	(South Africa) Rosalyn Fairbank (United States) Candy Reynolds	4–6, 6–7
Win	2–1	Apr 1983	Atlanta Open, U.S.	Hard	(United States) Sharon Walsh	(United States) Rosemary Casals (Australia) Wendy Turnbull	6–3, 7–6^{(7–1)}
Loss	2–2	Jan 1984	Stanford Classic, U.S.	Carpet	(United States) Rosemary Casals	(United States) Martina Navratilova (United States) Pam Shriver	2–6, 3–6
Win	3–2	Aug 1984	Virginia Slims of Newport, U.S.	Grass	(United States) Paula Smith	(United States) Lea Antonoplis (South Africa) Beverly Mould	7–5, 7–6^{(7–2)}
Win	4–2	Oct 1984	Brighton International, UK	Carpet	(United States) Paula Smith	(United States) Barbara Potter (United States) Sharon Walsh	6–7, 6–3, 7–5
Loss	4–3	Jun 1985	Birmingham Classic, UK	Grass	(United States) Elise Burgin	(United States) Terry Holladay (United States) Sharon Walsh	4–6, 7–5, 3–6
Loss	4–4	Mar 1986	VS Phoenix, U.S.	Hard	(United States) Linda Gates	(United States) Susan Mascarin (United States) Betsy Nagelsen	3–6, 7–5, 4–6
Win	5–4	Jul 1986	Berkeley Open, U.S.	Hard	(United States) Beth Herr	(United States) Amy Holton (South Africa) Elna Reinach	6–1, 6–2
Win	6–4	Jul 1986	San Diego Open, U.S.	Hard	(United States) Beth Herr	(United States) Elise Burgin (South Africa) Rosalyn Fairbank	5–7, 6–2, 6–4
Loss	6–5	Oct 1986	Zurich Open, Switzerland	Carpet	(United States) Lori McNeil	(West Germany) Steffi Graf (Argentina) Gabriela Sabatini	6–1, 4–6, 4–6

== Grand Slam singles performance timeline ==
Key
W	F	SF	QF	#R	RR	Q#	DNQ	A	NH

(W) winner; (F) finalist; (SF) semifinalist; (QF) quarterfinalist; (#R) rounds 4, 3, 2, 1; (RR) round-robin stage; (Q#) qualification round; (DNQ) did not qualify; (A) absent; (NH) not held; (SR) strike rate (events won / competed); (W–L) win–loss record.

Tournament	1978	1979	1980	1981	1982	1983	1984	1985	1986	1987	1988	Career SR
Australian Open	A	A	A	A	2R	3R	1R	1R	NH	2R	A	0 / 5
French Open	A	A	A	A	A	2R	1R	A	1R	A	A	0 / 3
Wimbledon	A	2R	1R	A	2R	1R	2R	3R	2R	3R	A	0 / 8
US Open	1R	2R	1R	3R	3R	2R	1R	4R	2R	1R	A	0 / 10
SR	0 / 1	0 / 2	0 / 2	0 / 1	0 / 3	0 / 4	0 / 4	0 / 3	0 / 3	0 / 3	0 / 0	0 / 26
Year-end ranking	91	70	114	88	38	31	19	35	34	51	NR	
