= 1984 Virginia Slims World Championship Series =

Women's tennis circuit

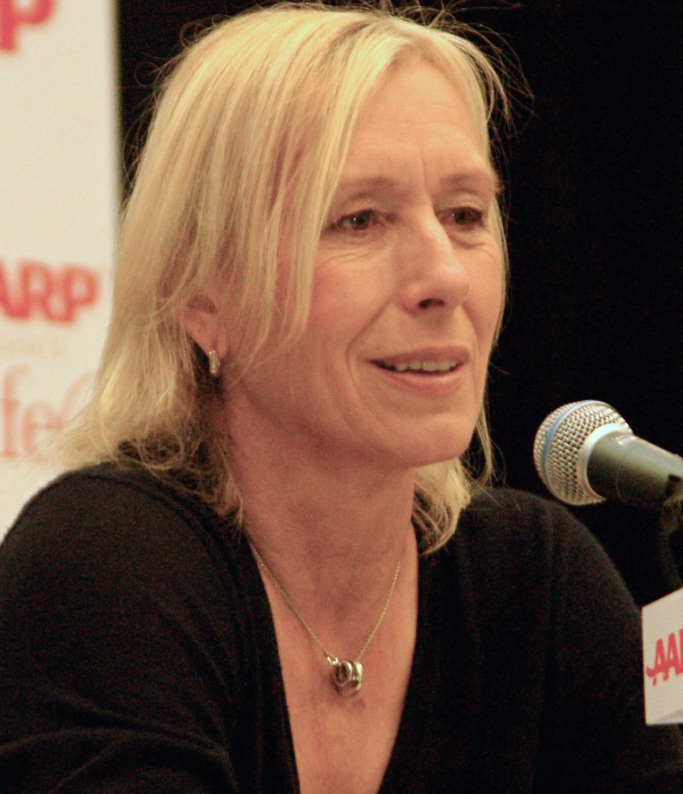
- Martina Navratilova finished the year as world No. 1 for the fifth time in her career. She won 15 singles tournaments during the season, including three majors at the French Open (completing a non-calendar year Grand Slam), the Wimbledon Championships, and the US Open, as well as the Virginia Slims Championships.

Details
- Duration: March 5, 1984 – March 24, 1985
- Edition: 12th
- Tournaments: 53
- Categories: Grand Slam (4); WTA Championships; Tour Events (48)

Achievements (singles)
- Most titles: (United States) Martina Navratilova (15)
- Most finals: (United States) Martina Navratilova (16)
- Prize money leader: (United States) Martina Navratilova $2,173,556
- Points leader: (United States) Martina Navratilova 192.72

Awards
- Player of the year: (United States) Martina Navratilova
- Doubles team of the year: (United States) Martina Navratilova; (United States) Pam Shriver
- Most improved player of the year: (United States) Kathy Jordan
- Newcomer of the year: (Bulgaria) Manuela Maleeva

The 1984 Virginia Slims World Championship Series was the 12th season since the foundation of the Women's Tennis Association. It commenced in March 1984, and concluded in March 1985 after 53 events.

The Virginia Slims World Championship Series was the elite tour for professional women's tennis organised by the Women's Tennis Association (WTA). It was held in place of the WTA Tour from 1983 until 1989 and featured tournaments that had previously been part of the Toyota Series and the Avon Championships Circuit. It included the four Grand Slam tournaments and a series of other events. ITF World Circuit tournaments were not part of the tour, although they were awarded points for the WTA World Ranking.

Tournaments were categorized by prize money on offer.

== Schedule ==
The table below shows the 1984 Virginia Slims World Championship Series schedule.

=== March ===
Week	Tournament	Champions	Runners-up	Semifinalists	Quarterfinalists
5 Mar	Bridgestone Doubles Championships; Tokyo & Yokohama, Japan; Carpet (i) – $175,000 – 8D	(United States) Ann Kiyomura (United States) Pam Shriver; 6–3, 6–7, 6–3	(United States) Barbara Jordan (Australia) Elizabeth Smylie	(United States) King / (United States) Walsh (United Kingdom) Hobbs / (Australia) Turnbull	(United States) Fernández / (United States) Herr (United States) Gadusek / (United States) White (United States) Moulton / (United States) Smith (United States) Leand / (United States) Daniels
12 Mar	Virginia Slims of Florida; Palm Beach Gardens, United States; Clay – $150,000 – 32S/16D	(United States) Chris Evert-Lloyd; 6–0, 6–1	(United States) Bonnie Gadusek	(Canada) Carling Bassett (United States) Zina Garrison	(Bulgaria) Manuela Maleeva (United States) Terry Phelps (Argentina) Ivanna Madruga-Osses (Italy) Raffaella Reggi
12 Mar	Virginia Slims of Florida; Palm Beach Gardens, United States; Clay – $150,000 – 32S/16D	(United States) Betsy Nagelsen (United States) Anne White; 2–6, 6–2, 6–2	(South Africa) Rosalyn Fairbank (United States) Candy Reynolds	(Canada) Carling Bassett (United States) Zina Garrison	(Bulgaria) Manuela Maleeva (United States) Terry Phelps (Argentina) Ivanna Madruga-Osses (Italy) Raffaella Reggi
19 Mar	Virginia Slims of Dallas; Dallas, United States; Carpet (i) – $150,000 – 32S/16D/32Q	(Czechoslovakia) Hana Mandlíková; 7–6, 3–6, 6–1	(United States) Kathy Jordan	(United States) Zina Garrison (United States) Pam Shriver	(United States) JoAnne Russell (Czechoslovakia) Helena Suková (Romania) Virginia Ruzici (United States) Kim Shaefer
19 Mar	Virginia Slims of Dallas; Dallas, United States; Carpet (i) – $150,000 – 32S/16D/32Q	(United States) Leslie Allen (United States) Anne White; 6–4, 5–7, 6–2	(United States) Sandy Collins (Australia) Elizabeth Smylie	(United States) Zina Garrison (United States) Pam Shriver	(United States) JoAnne Russell (Czechoslovakia) Helena Suková (Romania) Virginia Ruzici (United States) Kim Shaefer
26 Mar	Virginia Slims of Boston; Boston, United States; Carpet (i) – $150,000 – 32S/16D/32Q	(Czechoslovakia) Hana Mandlíková; 7–5, 6–0	(United States) Helena Suková	(United States) Beth Herr (United States) Kathy Jordan	(United States) Pam Casale (United States) Alycia Moulton (United States) Barbara Potter (West Germany) Bettina Bunge
26 Mar	Virginia Slims of Boston; Boston, United States; Carpet (i) – $150,000 – 32S/16D/32Q	(United States) Barbara Potter (United States) Sharon Walsh; 7–6, 6–0	(United States) Andrea Leand (United States) Mary Lou Daniels	(United States) Beth Herr (United States) Kathy Jordan	(United States) Pam Casale (United States) Alycia Moulton (United States) Barbara Potter (West Germany) Bettina Bunge

=== April ===
Week	Tournament	Champions	Runners-up	Semifinalists	Quarterfinalists
2 Apr	Miami Classic; Miami, United States; Clay – $50,000 – 32S/16D; Singles – Doubles	(Peru) Laura Arraya; 6–3, 6–2	(Austria) Petra Huber	(Socialist Federal Republic of Yugoslavia) Sabrina Goleš (Brazil) Patricia Medrado	(United States) Vicki Nelson-Dunbar (United States) Barbie Bramblett (United States) Barbara Gerken (United States) Paula Smith
2 Apr	Miami Classic; Miami, United States; Clay – $50,000 – 32S/16D; Singles – Doubles	(Brazil) Pat Medrado (South Africa) Yvonne Vermaak; 6–3, 6–3	(United States) Kate Latham (United States) Janet Newberry	(Socialist Federal Republic of Yugoslavia) Sabrina Goleš (Brazil) Patricia Medrado	(United States) Vicki Nelson-Dunbar (United States) Barbie Bramblett (United States) Barbara Gerken (United States) Paula Smith
9 Apr	Family Circle Cup; Hilton Head Island, United States; Clay – $200,000 – 56S/32D/32X	(United States) Chris Evert-Lloyd; 6–2, 6–3	(West Germany) Claudia Kohde-Kilsch	(United States) Zina Garrison (Canada) Carling Bassett	(West Germany) Sylvia Hanika (Socialist Federal Republic of Yugoslavia) Sabrina Goleš (Switzerland) Christiane Jolissaint (United States) Kathleen Horvath
9 Apr	Family Circle Cup; Hilton Head Island, United States; Clay – $200,000 – 56S/32D/32X	(West Germany) Claudia Kohde-Kilsch (Czechoslovakia) Hana Mandlíková; 6–3, 6–3	(United Kingdom) Anne Hobbs (United States) Sharon Walsh	(United States) Zina Garrison (Canada) Carling Bassett	(West Germany) Sylvia Hanika (Socialist Federal Republic of Yugoslavia) Sabrina Goleš (Switzerland) Christiane Jolissaint (United States) Kathleen Horvath
16 Apr	NutraSweet WTA Championships; Amelia Island, United States; Clay – $250,000 – 56S/32D/32X; Singles – Doubles	(United States) Martina Navratilova; 6–2, 6–0	(United States) Chris Evert-Lloyd	(Czechoslovakia) Hana Mandlíková (Bulgaria) Manuela Maleeva	(France) Catherine Tanvier (United States) Kathleen Horvath (United States) Zina Garrison (West Germany) Sylvia Hanika
16 Apr	NutraSweet WTA Championships; Amelia Island, United States; Clay – $250,000 – 56S/32D/32X; Singles – Doubles	(United States) Kathy Jordan (United States) Anne Smith; 6–3, 6–3	(United Kingdom) Anne Hobbs (Socialist Federal Republic of Yugoslavia) Mima Jaušovec	(Czechoslovakia) Hana Mandlíková (Bulgaria) Manuela Maleeva	(France) Catherine Tanvier (United States) Kathleen Horvath (United States) Zina Garrison (West Germany) Sylvia Hanika
23 Apr	Taranto Open; Taranto, Italy; Clay – $50,000 – 16S/16D/32X	(Italy) Sandra Cecchini; 6–2, 7–5	(Socialist Federal Republic of Yugoslavia) Sabrina Goleš	(Austria) Petra Huber (Argentina) Ivanna Madruga-Osses	(Italy) Sabina Simmonds (Australia) Bernadette Randall (Switzerland) Lilian Drescher (United States) Vicki Nelson
23 Apr	Taranto Open; Taranto, Italy; Clay – $50,000 – 16S/16D/32X	(Socialist Federal Republic of Yugoslavia) Sabrina Goleš (Austria) Petra Huber; 6–3, 6–3	(Soviet Union) Elena Eliseenko (Soviet Union) Natasha Reva	(Austria) Petra Huber (Argentina) Ivanna Madruga-Osses	(Italy) Sabina Simmonds (Australia) Bernadette Randall (Switzerland) Lilian Drescher (United States) Vicki Nelson
23 Apr	United Airlines Tournament of Champions; Orlando, United States; Clay – $200,000 – 28S/7D; Singles – Doubles	(United States) Martina Navratilova; 6–0, 6–1	(Peru) Laura Gildemeister	(United States) Bonnie Gadusek (United States) Lisa Bonder	(United States) Kathleen Horvath (West Germany) Sylvia Hanika (United Kingdom) Jo Durie (Hungary) Andrea Temesvári
23 Apr	United Airlines Tournament of Champions; Orlando, United States; Clay – $200,000 – 28S/7D; Singles – Doubles	(West Germany) Claudia Kohde-Kilsch (Czechoslovakia) Hana Mandlíková; 6–0, 1–6, 6–3	(United Kingdom) Anne Hobbs (Australia) Wendy Turnbull	(United States) Bonnie Gadusek (United States) Lisa Bonder	(United States) Kathleen Horvath (West Germany) Sylvia Hanika (United Kingdom) Jo Durie (Hungary) Andrea Temesvári
23 Apr	Virginia Slims of Durban; Durban, South Africa; Hard – $50,000 – 32S/16D	(United States) Peanut Louie; 6–1, 6–4	(South Africa) Rene Uys	(United Kingdom) Amanda Brown (United Kingdom) Annabel Croft	(West Germany) Heidi Eisterlehner (Brazil) Cláudia Monteiro (France) Corinne Vanier (United States) Robin White
23 Apr	Virginia Slims of Durban; Durban, South Africa; Hard – $50,000 – 32S/16D	(United States) Anna-Maria Fernandez (United States) Peanut Louie; 7–5, 5–7, 6–1	(Brazil) Cláudia Monteiro (South Africa) Beverly Mould	(United Kingdom) Amanda Brown (United Kingdom) Annabel Croft	(West Germany) Heidi Eisterlehner (Brazil) Cláudia Monteiro (France) Corinne Vanier (United States) Robin White
30 Apr	South African Open; Johannesburg, South Africa; Hard (i) – $150,000 – 32S/16D	(United States) Chris Evert-Lloyd; 6–3, 6–0	(United States) Andrea Jaeger	(United States) Anne White (South Africa) Rene Uys	(United States) Andrea Leand (United States) Sandy Collins (United Kingdom) Annabel Croft (United States) Ann Henricksson
30 Apr	South African Open; Johannesburg, South Africa; Hard (i) – $150,000 – 32S/16D	(South Africa) Rosalyn Fairbank (South Africa) Beverly Mould; 6–1, 6–2	(United States) Sandy Collins (United States) Andrea Leand	(United States) Anne White (South Africa) Rene Uys	(United States) Andrea Leand (United States) Sandy Collins (United Kingdom) Annabel Croft (United States) Ann Henricksson

=== May ===
Week	Tournament	Champions	Runners-up	Semifinalists	Quarterfinalists
7 May	Swiss Open; Lugano, Switzerland; Clay – $100,000 – 32S/16D	(Bulgaria) Manuela Maleeva; 6–1, 6–1	(Czechoslovakia) Iva Budařová	(United States) Kathleen Horvath (Italy) Raffaella Reggi	(Czechoslovakia) Kateřina Böhmová (Netherlands) Marcella Mesker (Argentina) Ivanna Madruga-Osses (Japan) Etsuko Inoue
7 May	Swiss Open; Lugano, Switzerland; Clay – $100,000 – 32S/16D	(Switzerland) Christiane Jolissaint (Netherlands) Marcella Mesker; 6–1, 6–2	(Czechoslovakia) Iva Budařová (Czechoslovakia) Marcela Skuherská	(United States) Kathleen Horvath (Italy) Raffaella Reggi	(Czechoslovakia) Kateřina Böhmová (Netherlands) Marcella Mesker (Argentina) Ivanna Madruga-Osses (Japan) Etsuko Inoue
14 May	German Open; West Berlin, West Germany; Clay – $150,000 – 56S/32D	(West Germany) Claudia Kohde-Kilsch; 7–6^{(10–8)}, 6–1	(United States) Kathleen Horvath	(United States) Kathy Rinaldi (France) Catherine Tanvier	(West Germany) Steffi Graf (Czechoslovakia) Helena Suková (United States) Andrea Leand (Socialist Federal Republic of Yugoslavia) Sabrina Goleš
14 May	German Open; West Berlin, West Germany; Clay – $150,000 – 56S/32D	(United Kingdom) Anne Hobbs (United States) Candy Reynolds; 6–3, 4–6, 7–6^{(13–11)}	(United States) Kathleen Horvath (Romania) Virginia Ruzici	(United States) Kathy Rinaldi (France) Catherine Tanvier	(West Germany) Steffi Graf (Czechoslovakia) Helena Suková (United States) Andrea Leand (Socialist Federal Republic of Yugoslavia) Sabrina Goleš
21 May	Italian Open; Perugia, Italy; Clay – $150,000 – 56S/32D	(Bulgaria) Manuela Maleeva; 6–3, 6–3	(United States) Chris Evert-Lloyd	(United States) Lisa Bonder (Canada) Carling Bassett	(Hungary) Andrea Temesvári (Italy) Raffaella Reggi (South Africa) Yvonne Vermaak (Romania) Virginia Ruzici
21 May	Italian Open; Perugia, Italy; Clay – $150,000 – 56S/32D	(Czechoslovakia) Iva Budařová (Czechoslovakia) Helena Suková; 7–6, 1–6, 6–4	(United States) Kathleen Horvath (Romania) Virginia Ruzici	(United States) Lisa Bonder (Canada) Carling Bassett	(Hungary) Andrea Temesvári (Italy) Raffaella Reggi (South Africa) Yvonne Vermaak (Romania) Virginia Ruzici
28 May	French Open; Paris, France; Grand Slam; Clay – $750,000 – 128S/64Q/64D/48X; Singles – Doubles – Mixed doubles	(United States) Martina Navratilova; 6–3, 6–1	(United States) Chris Evert-Lloyd	(Czechoslovakia) Hana Mandlíková (United States) Camille Benjamin	(United States) Kathleen Horvath (United States) Melissa Brown (United States) Lisa Bonder (Canada) Carling Bassett
28 May	French Open; Paris, France; Grand Slam; Clay – $750,000 – 128S/64Q/64D/48X; Singles – Doubles – Mixed doubles	(United States) Martina Navratilova (United States) Pam Shriver; 5–7, 6–3, 6–2	(West Germany) Claudia Kohde-Kilsch (Czechoslovakia) Hana Mandlíková	(Czechoslovakia) Hana Mandlíková (United States) Camille Benjamin	(United States) Kathleen Horvath (United States) Melissa Brown (United States) Lisa Bonder (Canada) Carling Bassett
28 May	French Open; Paris, France; Grand Slam; Clay – $750,000 – 128S/64Q/64D/48X; Singles – Doubles – Mixed doubles	(United States) Anne Smith (United States) Dick Stockton; 6–2, 6–4	(Australia) Anne Minter (Australia) Laurie Warder	(Czechoslovakia) Hana Mandlíková (United States) Camille Benjamin	(United States) Kathleen Horvath (United States) Melissa Brown (United States) Lisa Bonder (Canada) Carling Bassett

=== June ===
Week	Tournament	Champions	Runners-up	Semifinalists	Quarterfinalists
11 Jun	Edgbaston Cup; Birmingham, Great Britain; Grass – $125,000 – 56S/32D; Singles – Doubles	(United States) Pam Shriver; 7–6^{(7–2)}, 6–3	(United States) Anne White	(West Germany) Bettina Bunge (United Kingdom) Anne Hobbs	(United States) Terry Holladay (United States) Wendy White (Australia) Elizabeth Smylie (United States) Camille Benjamin
11 Jun	Edgbaston Cup; Birmingham, Great Britain; Grass – $125,000 – 56S/32D; Singles – Doubles	(United States) Leslie Allen (United States) Anne White; 7–5, 6–3	(United States) Barbara Jordan (Australia) Elizabeth Smylie	(West Germany) Bettina Bunge (United Kingdom) Anne Hobbs	(United States) Terry Holladay (United States) Wendy White (Australia) Elizabeth Smylie (United States) Camille Benjamin
18 Jun	Eastbourne International; Eastbourne, Great Britain; Grass – $175,000 – 64S/32D/32X; Singles – Doubles	(United States) Martina Navratilova; 6–4, 6–1	(United States) Kathy Jordan	(West Germany) Claudia Kohde-Kilsch (United States) Chris Evert-Lloyd	(Australia) Wendy Turnbull (United States) Barbara Potter (United States) Terry Phelps (Czechoslovakia) Helena Suková
18 Jun	Eastbourne International; Eastbourne, Great Britain; Grass – $175,000 – 64S/32D/32X; Singles – Doubles	(United States) Martina Navratilova; (United States) Pam Shriver; 6–4, 6–2	(United States) Jo Durie; (United States) Ann Kiyomura	(West Germany) Claudia Kohde-Kilsch (United States) Chris Evert-Lloyd	(Australia) Wendy Turnbull (United States) Barbara Potter (United States) Terry Phelps (Czechoslovakia) Helena Suková
25 Jun	Wimbledon Championships; London, Great Britain; Grand Slam; Grass – $680,000 – 128S/64Q/64D/48X; Singles – Doubles – Mixed doubles	(United States) Martina Navratilova; 7–6^{(7–5)}, 6–2	(United States) Chris Evert-Lloyd	(United States) Kathy Jordan (Czechoslovakia) Hana Mandlíková	(Bulgaria) Manuela Maleeva (United States) Pam Shriver (United Kingdom) Jo Durie (Sweden) Carina Karlsson
25 Jun	Wimbledon Championships; London, Great Britain; Grand Slam; Grass – $680,000 – 128S/64Q/64D/48X; Singles – Doubles – Mixed doubles	(United States) Martina Navratilova; (United States) Pam Shriver; 6–3, 6–4	(United States) Kathy Jordan (United States) Anne Smith	(United States) Kathy Jordan (Czechoslovakia) Hana Mandlíková	(Bulgaria) Manuela Maleeva (United States) Pam Shriver (United Kingdom) Jo Durie (Sweden) Carina Karlsson
25 Jun	Wimbledon Championships; London, Great Britain; Grand Slam; Grass – $680,000 – 128S/64Q/64D/48X; Singles – Doubles – Mixed doubles	(Australia) Wendy Turnbull; (United Kingdom) John Lloyd; 6–3, 6–3	(United States) Kathy Jordan (United States) Steve Denton	(United States) Kathy Jordan (Czechoslovakia) Hana Mandlíková	(Bulgaria) Manuela Maleeva (United States) Pam Shriver (United Kingdom) Jo Durie (Sweden) Carina Karlsson

=== July ===
Week	Tournament	Champions	Runners-up	Semifinalists	Quarterfinalists
9 Jul	Santista Textile Open; Rio de Janeiro, Brazil; Hard – $50,000 – 32S/16D	(Italy) Sandra Cecchini; 6–3, 6–3	(Argentina) Adriana Villagrán-Reami	(Argentina) Emilse Raponi-Longo (Brazil) Silvana Campos	(Argentina) Gabriela Sabatini (Canada) Marianne Groat (South Korea) Han Eun-sook (Japan) Emiko Okagawa
9 Jul	Santista Textile Open; Rio de Janeiro, Brazil; Hard – $50,000 – 32S/16D	(Canada) Jill Hetherington (Canada) Hélène Pelletier; 6–3, 2–6, 7–6	(United States) Penny Barg-Mager (United States) Kyle Copeland	(Argentina) Emilse Raponi-Longo (Brazil) Silvana Campos	(Argentina) Gabriela Sabatini (Canada) Marianne Groat (South Korea) Han Eun-sook (Japan) Emiko Okagawa
15 Jul	Federation Cup; São Paulo, Brazil – clay	Czechoslovakia; 2–1	Australia	Yugoslavia; United States	France; West Germany; Bulgaria; Italy
30 Jul	Virginia Slims of Newport; Newport, United States; Grass – $150,000 – 32S/16D; Singles – Doubles	(United States) Martina Navratilova; 6–3, 7–6^{(7–3)}	(United States) Gigi Fernández	(Australia) Anne Minter (South Africa) Rosalyn Fairbank	(United States) Wendy White (United States) Lea Antonoplis (South Africa) Beverly Mould (United States) Kim Steinmetz
30 Jul	Virginia Slims of Newport; Newport, United States; Grass – $150,000 – 32S/16D; Singles – Doubles	(United States) Alycia Moulton (United States) Paula Smith; 7–5, 7–6^{(7–2)}	(United States) Lea Antonoplis (South Africa) Beverly Mould	(Australia) Anne Minter (South Africa) Rosalyn Fairbank	(United States) Wendy White (United States) Lea Antonoplis (South Africa) Beverly Mould (United States) Kim Steinmetz

=== August ===
Week	Tournament	Champions	Runners-up	Semifinalists	Quarterfinalists
6 Aug	U.S. Clay Court Championships; Indianapolis, United States; Clay – $200,000 – 56S/32D/32X; Singles – Doubles	(Bulgaria) Manuela Maleeva; 6–4, 6–3	(United States) Lisa Bonder	(Hungary) Andrea Temesvári (United States) Pam Casale	(United States) Kathy Rinaldi (United States) Terry Phelps (United States) Michelle Torres (United States) Zina Garrison
6 Aug	U.S. Clay Court Championships; Indianapolis, United States; Clay – $200,000 – 56S/32D/32X; Singles – Doubles	(South Africa) Beverly Mould (United States) Paula Smith; 6–2, 7–5	(United States) Elise Burgin (United States) JoAnne Russell	(Hungary) Andrea Temesvári (United States) Pam Casale	(United States) Kathy Rinaldi (United States) Terry Phelps (United States) Michelle Torres (United States) Zina Garrison
13 Aug	United Jersey Bank Classic; Mahwah, United States; Hard – $150,000 – 56S/32D; Singles – Doubles	(United States) Martina Navratilova; 6–4, 4–6, 7–5	(United States) Pam Shriver	(United States) Pam Casale (United States) Zina Garrison	(United States) Barbara Potter (Bulgaria) Manuela Maleeva (United States) Bonnie Gadusek (United States) Camille Benjamin
13 Aug	United Jersey Bank Classic; Mahwah, United States; Hard – $150,000 – 56S/32D; Singles – Doubles	(United States) Martina Navratilova (United States) Pam Shriver; 7–6, 3–6, 6–2	(United Kingdom) Jo Durie (United States) Ann Kiyomura	(United States) Pam Casale (United States) Zina Garrison	(United States) Barbara Potter (Bulgaria) Manuela Maleeva (United States) Bonnie Gadusek (United States) Camille Benjamin
20 Aug	Player's International Canadian Open; Montreal, Canada; Hard – $200,000 – 56S/32D	(United States) Chris Evert-Lloyd; 6–2, 7–6	(United States) Alycia Moulton	(Czechoslovakia) Helena Suková (Sweden) Catarina Lindqvist	(United Kingdom) Jo Durie (West Germany) Claudia Kohde-Kilsch (United States) Terry Phelps (United States) Grace Kim
20 Aug	Player's International Canadian Open; Montreal, Canada; Hard – $200,000 – 56S/32D	(United States) Kathy Jordan (Australia) Elizabeth Smylie; 6–1, 6–2	(West Germany) Claudia Kohde-Kilsch (Czechoslovakia) Hana Mandlíková	(Czechoslovakia) Helena Suková (Sweden) Catarina Lindqvist	(United Kingdom) Jo Durie (West Germany) Claudia Kohde-Kilsch (United States) Terry Phelps (United States) Grace Kim
28 Aug	US Open; New York City, United States; Grand Slam; Hard – $1,100,000 – 128S/64Q/64D/48X; Singles – Doubles – Mixed doubles	(United States) Martina Navratilova; 4–6 6–4, 6–4	(United States) Chris Evert-Lloyd	(Australia) Wendy Turnbull (Canada) Carling Bassett	(Czechoslovakia) Helena Suková (United States) Pam Shriver (Czechoslovakia) Hana Mandlíková (West Germany) Sylvia Hanika
28 Aug	US Open; New York City, United States; Grand Slam; Hard – $1,100,000 – 128S/64Q/64D/48X; Singles – Doubles – Mixed doubles	(United States) Martina Navratilova (United States) Pam Shriver; 6–2, 6–4	(United Kingdom) Anne Hobbs (Australia) Wendy Turnbull	(Australia) Wendy Turnbull (Canada) Carling Bassett	(Czechoslovakia) Helena Suková (United States) Pam Shriver (Czechoslovakia) Hana Mandlíková (West Germany) Sylvia Hanika
28 Aug	US Open; New York City, United States; Grand Slam; Hard – $1,100,000 – 128S/64Q/64D/48X; Singles – Doubles – Mixed doubles	(Bulgaria) Manuela Maleeva (United States) Tom Gullikson; 2–6, 7–5, 6–4	(Australia) Elizabeth Smylie (Australia) John Fitzgerald	(Australia) Wendy Turnbull (Canada) Carling Bassett	(Czechoslovakia) Helena Suková (United States) Pam Shriver (Czechoslovakia) Hana Mandlíková (West Germany) Sylvia Hanika

=== September ===
Week	Tournament	Champions	Runners-up	Semifinalists	Quarterfinalists
10 Sepr	Virginia Slims of Utah; Salt Lake City, United States; Ginny Circuit; Hard – $75,000 – 32S/16D	(South Africa) Yvonne Vermaak; 6–1, 6–2	(United States) Terry Holladay	(Australia) Anne Minter (Australia) Susan Leo	(South Africa) Rene Uys (Australia) Elizabeth Minter (United States) Kathleen Cummings (United States) Maeve Quinlan
10 Sepr	Virginia Slims of Utah; Salt Lake City, United States; Ginny Circuit; Hard – $75,000 – 32S/16D	(Australia) Anne Minter (Australia) Elizabeth Minter; 6–2, 7–5	(United States) Heather Crowe (United States) Robin White	(Australia) Anne Minter (Australia) Susan Leo	(South Africa) Rene Uys (Australia) Elizabeth Minter (United States) Kathleen Cummings (United States) Maeve Quinlan
17 Sep	Maybelline Classic; Fort Lauderdale, United States; Hard – $150,000 – 32S/16D; Singles – Doubles	(United States) Martina Navratilova; 6–1, 6–0	(United States) Michelle Torres	(Australia) Wendy Turnbull (United States) Kathy Rinaldi	(United States) Elise Burgin (France) Catherine Tanvier (United States) Bonnie Gadusek (United States) Terry Phelps
17 Sep	Maybelline Classic; Fort Lauderdale, United States; Hard – $150,000 – 32S/16D; Singles – Doubles	(United States) Martina Navratilova (Australia) Elizabeth Sayers; 2–6, 6–2, 6–3	(United States) Barbara Potter (United States) Sharon Walsh	(Australia) Wendy Turnbull (United States) Kathy Rinaldi	(United States) Elise Burgin (France) Catherine Tanvier (United States) Bonnie Gadusek (United States) Terry Phelps
17 Sep	Ginny of San Diego; San Diego, United States; Ginny Circuit; Hard – $50,000 – 32S/16D	(United States) Debbie Spence; 6–3, 6–7, 6–4	(United States) Betsy Nagelsen	(South Africa) Yvonne Vermaak (United States) Lisa Spain-Short	(United States) Linda Howell (United States) Heather Ludloff (Argentina) Emilse Raponi-Longo (United States) Paula Smith
17 Sep	Ginny of San Diego; San Diego, United States; Ginny Circuit; Hard – $50,000 – 32S/16D	(United States) Betsy Nagelsen (United States) Paula Smith; 6–2, 6–4	(United States) Terry Holladay (Poland) Iwona Kuczyńska	(South Africa) Yvonne Vermaak (United States) Lisa Spain-Short	(United States) Linda Howell (United States) Heather Ludloff (Argentina) Emilse Raponi-Longo (United States) Paula Smith
24 Sep	Central Fidelity Banks International; Richmond, United States; Ginny Circuit; Hard – $50,000 – 32S/16D	(United States) JoAnne Russell; 6–3, 4–6, 6–2	(United States) Michaela Washington	(United States) Ginny Purdy (United States) Kathleen Cummings	(United States) Candy Reynolds (South Africa) Rene Mentz (Greece) Angelikí Kanellopoúlou (Peru) Pilar Vásquez
24 Sep	Central Fidelity Banks International; Richmond, United States; Ginny Circuit; Hard – $50,000 – 32S/16D	(Australia) Elizabeth Minter (United States) JoAnne Russell; 6–4, 3–6, 7–6	(South Africa) Jennifer Mundel-Reinbold (United States) Felicia Raschiatore	(United States) Ginny Purdy (United States) Kathleen Cummings	(United States) Candy Reynolds (South Africa) Rene Mentz (Greece) Angelikí Kanellopoúlou (Peru) Pilar Vásquez
24 Sep	Virginia Slims of New Orleans; New Orleans, United States; Carpet (i) – $150,000 – 32S/16D; Singles – Doubles	(United States) Martina Navratilova; 6–4, 6–3	(United States) Zina Garrison	(United States) Alycia Moulton (United States) Pam Shriver	(United States) Jenny Klitch (Australia) Wendy Turnbull (United States) Terry Holladay (United States) Pam Casale
24 Sep	Virginia Slims of New Orleans; New Orleans, United States; Carpet (i) – $150,000 – 32S/16D; Singles – Doubles	(United States) Martina Navratilova (United States) Pam Shriver; 6–4, 6–1	(Australia) Wendy Turnbull (United States) Sharon Walsh	(United States) Alycia Moulton (United States) Pam Shriver	(United States) Jenny Klitch (Australia) Wendy Turnbull (United States) Terry Holladay (United States) Pam Casale

=== October ===
Week	Tournament	Champions	Runners-up	Semifinalists	Quarterfinalists
1 Oct	Virginia Slims of Los Angeles; Manhattan Beach, United States; Hard – $150,000 – 32S/16D	(United States) Chris Evert-Lloyd; 6–2, 6–3	(Australia) Wendy Turnbull	(West Germany) Sylvia Hanika (South Africa) Rosalyn Fairbank	(United States) Alycia Moulton (West Germany) Bettina Bunge (United States) JoAnne Russell (United States) Pam Shriver
1 Oct	Virginia Slims of Los Angeles; Manhattan Beach, United States; Hard – $150,000 – 32S/16D	(United States) Chris Evert-Lloyd (Australia) Wendy Turnbull; 6–2, 6–4	(West Germany) Bettina Bunge (West Germany) Eva Pfaff	(West Germany) Sylvia Hanika (South Africa) Rosalyn Fairbank	(United States) Alycia Moulton (West Germany) Bettina Bunge (United States) JoAnne Russell (United States) Pam Shriver
1 Oct	Borden Classic; Tokyo, Japan; Hard – $50,000 – 32S/16D; Singles – Doubles	(Japan) Etsuko Inoue; 6–0, 6–0	(United States) Beth Herr	(United States) Lisa Bonder (Japan) Masako Yanagi	(United States) Candy Reynolds (United States) Shawn Foltz (Argentina) Adriana Villagrán (United States) Maeve Quinlan
1 Oct	Borden Classic; Tokyo, Japan; Hard – $50,000 – 32S/16D; Singles – Doubles	(Argentina) Mercedes Paz (United States) Ronni Reis; 6–4, 7–5	(Argentina) Emilse Raponi-Longo (Argentina) Adriana Villagrán-Reami	(United States) Lisa Bonder (Japan) Masako Yanagi	(United States) Candy Reynolds (United States) Shawn Foltz (Argentina) Adriana Villagrán (United States) Maeve Quinlan
8 Oct	Florida Federal Open; Tampa, United States; Hard – $150,000 – 32S/16D	(United States) Michelle Torres; 6–1, 7–6^{(7–4)}	(Canada) Carling Bassett	(United States) Camille Benjamin (United States) Pam Casale	(Czechoslovakia) Hana Mandlíková (United States) Bonnie Gadusek (United States) Peanut Louie (United States) Gigi Fernández
8 Oct	Florida Federal Open; Tampa, United States; Hard – $150,000 – 32S/16D	(Canada) Carling Bassett (Australia) Elizabeth Smylie; 6–4, 6–3	(United States) Mary Lou Daniels (United States) Wendy White	(United States) Camille Benjamin (United States) Pam Casale	(Czechoslovakia) Hana Mandlíková (United States) Bonnie Gadusek (United States) Peanut Louie (United States) Gigi Fernández
8 Oct	Japan Open Tennis Championships; Tokyo, Japan; Hard – $50,000 – 32S/16D	(Switzerland) Lilian Drescher; 6–4, 6–2	(United States) Shawn Foltz	(West Germany) Myriam Schropp (United States) Molly Van Nostrand	(United States) Beth Herr (United States) Kathrin Keil (United States) Betsy Nagelsen (Argentina) Emilse Raponi-Longo
8 Oct	Japan Open Tennis Championships; Tokyo, Japan; Hard – $50,000 – 32S/16D	(United States) Betsy Nagelsen (United States) Candy Reynolds; 6–3, 6–2	(Argentina) Emilse Raponi-Longo (Argentina) Adriana Villagrán-Reami	(West Germany) Myriam Schropp (United States) Molly Van Nostrand	(United States) Beth Herr (United States) Kathrin Keil (United States) Betsy Nagelsen (Argentina) Emilse Raponi-Longo
15 Oct	Porsche Grand Prix; Filderstadt, West Germany; Hard (i) – $150,000 – 32S/16D	(Sweden) Catarina Lindqvist; 6–1, 6–4	(West Germany) Steffi Graf	(United States) Andrea Leand (United States) Terry Phelps	(West Germany) Eva Pfaff (West Germany) Claudia Kohde-Kilsch (Czechoslovakia) Helena Suková (West Germany) Bettina Bunge
15 Oct	Porsche Grand Prix; Filderstadt, West Germany; Hard (i) – $150,000 – 32S/16D	(West Germany) Claudia Kohde-Kilsch (Czechoslovakia) Helena Suková; 6–2, 4–6, 6–3	(West Germany) Bettina Bunge (West Germany) Eva Pfaff	(United States) Andrea Leand (United States) Terry Phelps	(West Germany) Eva Pfaff (West Germany) Claudia Kohde-Kilsch (Czechoslovakia) Helena Suková (West Germany) Bettina Bunge
22 Oct	Pretty Polly Classic; Brighton, Great Britain; Carpet (i) – $175,000 – 32S/16D	(West Germany) Sylvia Hanika; 6–3, 1–6, 6–2	(United States) JoAnne Russell	(Hungary) Andrea Temesvári (France) Pascale Paradis	(United States) Pam Shriver (Romania) Virginia Ruzici (United Kingdom) Jo Durie (France) Catherine Tanvier
22 Oct	Pretty Polly Classic; Brighton, Great Britain; Carpet (i) – $175,000 – 32S/16D	(United States) Alycia Moulton (United States) Paula Smith; 6–7, 6–3, 7–5	(United States) Barbara Potter (United States) Sharon Walsh	(Hungary) Andrea Temesvári (France) Pascale Paradis	(United States) Pam Shriver (Romania) Virginia Ruzici (United Kingdom) Jo Durie (France) Catherine Tanvier
29 Oct	European Indoors; Zürich, Switzerland; Carpet (i) – $150,000 – 32S/16D/32Q	(United States) Zina Garrison; 6–1, 0–6, 6–2	(West Germany) Claudia Kohde-Kilsch	(Hungary) Andrea Temesvári (Bulgaria) Manuela Maleeva	(United States) Beth Herr (Italy) Sandra Cecchini (Bulgaria) Katerina Maleeva (Czechoslovakia) Helena Suková
29 Oct	European Indoors; Zürich, Switzerland; Carpet (i) – $150,000 – 32S/16D/32Q	(United States) Andrea Leand (Hungary) Andrea Temesvári; 6–1, 6–3	(West Germany) Claudia Kohde-Kilsch (Czechoslovakia) Hana Mandlíková	(Hungary) Andrea Temesvári (Bulgaria) Manuela Maleeva	(United States) Beth Herr (Italy) Sandra Cecchini (Bulgaria) Katerina Maleeva (Czechoslovakia) Helena Suková

=== November ===
Week	Tournament	Champions	Runners-up	Semifinalists	Quarterfinalists
12 Nov	National Panasonic Open; Brisbane, Australia; Grass – $150,000 – 56S/32D	(Czechoslovakia) Helena Suková; 6–4, 6–4	(Australia) Elizabeth Smylie	(West Germany) Bettina Bunge (France) Pascale Paradis	(United States) Pam Shriver (Sweden) Catarina Lindqvist (United States) Barbara Potter (West Germany) Eva Pfaff
12 Nov	National Panasonic Open; Brisbane, Australia; Grass – $150,000 – 56S/32D	(United States) Martina Navratilova (United States) Pam Shriver; 6–3, 6–2	(West Germany) Bettina Bunge; (West Germany) Eva Pfaff	(West Germany) Bettina Bunge (France) Pascale Paradis	(United States) Pam Shriver (Sweden) Catarina Lindqvist (United States) Barbara Potter (West Germany) Eva Pfaff
12 Nov	Lion's Cup; Tokyo, Japan; Carpet – $200,000 – 4S	(Bulgaria) Manuela Maleeva; 6–1, 1–6, 6–4	(Czechoslovakia) Hana Mandlíková	(Hungary) Andrea Temesvári (United States) Lisa Bonder	
19 Nov	NSW Building Society Open; Sydney, Australia; Grass – $150,000 – 56S/32D; Singles – Doubles	(United States) Martina Navratilova; 6–1, 6–1	(United States) Ann Henricksson	(United States) Zina Garrison (Australia) Wendy Turnbull	(South Africa) Yvonne Vermaak (West Germany) Claudia Kohde-Kilsch (United States) Gigi Fernández (Netherlands) Marcella Mesker
19 Nov	NSW Building Society Open; Sydney, Australia; Grass – $150,000 – 56S/32D; Singles – Doubles	(West Germany) Claudia Kohde-Kilsch (Czechoslovakia) Helena Suková; 6–2, 7–6	(Australia) Wendy Turnbull (United States) Sharon Walsh	(United States) Zina Garrison (Australia) Wendy Turnbull	(South Africa) Yvonne Vermaak (West Germany) Claudia Kohde-Kilsch (United States) Gigi Fernández (Netherlands) Marcella Mesker
26 Nov	1984 Australian Open; Melbourne, Australia; Grand Slam; Hard – $645,000 – 128S/64Q/64D/48X; Singles – Doubles	(United States) Chris Evert-Lloyd; 6–7^{(4–7)} 6–1, 6–3	(Czechoslovakia) Helena Suková	(United States) Martina Navratilova (Australia) Wendy Turnbull	(United States) Barbara Potter (United States) Pam Shriver (United States) Sharon Walsh (France) Sophie Amiach
26 Nov	1984 Australian Open; Melbourne, Australia; Grand Slam; Hard – $645,000 – 128S/64Q/64D/48X; Singles – Doubles	(United States) Martina Navratilova (United States) Pam Shriver; 6–3, 6–4	(West Germany) Claudia Kohde-Kilsch (Czechoslovakia) Helena Suková	(United States) Martina Navratilova (Australia) Wendy Turnbull	(United States) Barbara Potter (United States) Pam Shriver (United States) Sharon Walsh (France) Sophie Amiach

=== December ===
Week	Tournament	Champions	Runners-up	Semifinalists	Quarterfinalists
10 Dec	Pan Pacific Open; Tokyo, Japan; Carpet (i) – $250,000 – 28S/16D/20Q	(Bulgaria) Manuela Maleeva; 3–6, 6–3, 6–4	(West Germany) Claudia Kohde-Kilsch	(Canada) Carling Bassett (Czechoslovakia) Helena Suková	(United States) Barbara Potter (United States) Lisa Bonder (United States) Gigi Fernández (Sweden) Catarina Lindqvist
10 Dec	Pan Pacific Open; Tokyo, Japan; Carpet (i) – $250,000 – 28S/16D/20Q	(West Germany) Claudia Kohde-Kilsch (Czechoslovakia) Helena Suková; 6–4, 6–1	(Australia) Elizabeth Smylie (France) Catherine Tanvier	(Canada) Carling Bassett (Czechoslovakia) Helena Suková	(United States) Barbara Potter (United States) Lisa Bonder (United States) Gigi Fernández (Sweden) Catarina Lindqvist

=== January 1985 ===
Week	Tournament	Champions	Runners-up	Semifinalists	Quarterfinalists
2 Jan	Ginny Championships; Port St. Lucie, United States; Hard – $100,000 – 14S/5D	(Sweden) Catarina Lindqvist; 6–3, 6–1	(United States) Terry Holladay	(United States) Debbie Spence (France) Pascale Paradis	(South Africa) Yvonne Vermaak (United States) Andrea Leand (United States) Kim Sands (United States) JoAnne Russell
2 Jan	Ginny Championships; Port St. Lucie, United States; Hard – $100,000 – 14S/5D	(United States) Betsy Nagelsen (United States) Paula Smith; 6–4, 6–1	(Switzerland) Christiane Jolissaint (Netherlands) Marcella Mesker	(United States) Debbie Spence (France) Pascale Paradis	(South Africa) Yvonne Vermaak (United States) Andrea Leand (United States) Kim Sands (United States) JoAnne Russell
7 Jan	Virginia Slims of Washington; Washington, United States; Carpet (i) – $150,000 – 32S/16D/32Q	(United States) Martina Navratilova; 6–3, 6–2	(Bulgaria) Manuela Maleeva	(United States) Zina Garrison (United States) Kathy Rinaldi	(Czechoslovakia) Helena Suková (Australia) Wendy Turnbull (United States) Kathy Jordan (Czechoslovakia) Hana Mandlíková
7 Jan	Virginia Slims of Washington; Washington, United States; Carpet (i) – $150,000 – 32S/16D/32Q	(United States) Gigi Fernández (United States) Martina Navratilova; 6–3, 3–6, 6–3	(West Germany) Claudia Kohde-Kilsch (Czechoslovakia) Helena Suková	(United States) Zina Garrison (United States) Kathy Rinaldi	(Czechoslovakia) Helena Suková (Australia) Wendy Turnbull (United States) Kathy Jordan (Czechoslovakia) Hana Mandlíková
14 Jan	Virginia Slims of Denver; Denver, United States; Carpet (i) – $75,000 – 32S/16D	(United States) Peanut Louie; 6–4, 4–6, 6–4	(United States) Zina Garrison	(Argentina) Gabriela Sabatini (Soviet Union) Larisa Savchenko	(United States) Mary Lou Piatek (United States) Wendy White: (United States) Sharon Walsh; (United States) Lisa Spain-Short
14 Jan	Virginia Slims of Denver; Denver, United States; Carpet (i) – $75,000 – 32S/16D	(United States) Mary Lou Piatek (United States) Wendy White; 1–6, 6–4, 7–5	(United States) Sharon Walsh (United States) Leslie Allen	(Argentina) Gabriela Sabatini (Soviet Union) Larisa Savchenko	(United States) Mary Lou Piatek (United States) Wendy White: (United States) Sharon Walsh; (United States) Lisa Spain-Short
21 Jan	Virginia Slims of Florida; Key Biscayne, United States; Hard – $150,000 – 56S/32D/32Q	(United States) Chris Evert-Lloyd; 6–2, 6–4	(United States) Martina Navratilova	(Sweden) Catarina Lindqvist (United States) Peanut Louie	(Canada) Carling Bassett (Czechoslovakia) Hana Mandlíková (United States) Kathy Rinaldi (United States) Bobbie Gadusek
21 Jan	Virginia Slims of Florida; Key Biscayne, United States; Hard – $150,000 – 56S/32D/32Q	(United States) Kathy Jordan (Australia) Elizabeth Smylie; 6–4, 7–6	(Soviet Union) Svetlana Cherneva (Soviet Union) Larisa Savchenko	(Sweden) Catarina Lindqvist (United States) Peanut Louie	(Canada) Carling Bassett (Czechoslovakia) Hana Mandlíková (United States) Kathy Rinaldi (United States) Bobbie Gadusek
28 Jan	BMW Challenge; Marco Island, United States; Hard – $100,000 – 56S/32D	(United States) Bonnie Gadusek; 6–3, 6–4	(United States) Pam Casale	(Socialist Federal Republic of Yugoslavia) Sabrina Goleš (United States) Kathy Jordan	(United States) Peanut Louie (Australia) Anne Minter: (United States) Camille Benjamin; (United States) Lisa Bonder
28 Jan	BMW Challenge; Marco Island, United States; Hard – $100,000 – 56S/32D	(United States) Kathy Jordan (Australia) Elizabeth Smylie; 6–3, 6–3	(United States) Camille Benjamin (United States) Bonnie Gadusek	(Socialist Federal Republic of Yugoslavia) Sabrina Goleš (United States) Kathy Jordan	(United States) Peanut Louie (Australia) Anne Minter: (United States) Camille Benjamin; (United States) Lisa Bonder

=== February 1985 ===
Week	Tournament	Champions	Runners-up	Semifinalists	Quarterfinalists
4 Feb	Lipton International Players Championships; Delray Beach, United States; Hard – $750,000 – 128S/64D/64Q; Singles – Doubles	(United States) Martina Navratilova; 6–2, 6–4	(United States) Chris Evert-Lloyd	(Canada) Carling Bassett (West Germany) Steffi Graf	(West Germany) Bettina Bunge (Czechoslovakia) Hana Mandlíková (Hungary) Andrea Temesvári (United States) Barbara Potter
4 Feb	Lipton International Players Championships; Delray Beach, United States; Hard – $750,000 – 128S/64D/64Q; Singles – Doubles	(United States) Gigi Fernández (United States) Martina Navratilova; 7–6, 6–2	(United States) Kathy Jordan (Czechoslovakia) Hana Mandlíková	(Canada) Carling Bassett (West Germany) Steffi Graf	(West Germany) Bettina Bunge (Czechoslovakia) Hana Mandlíková (Hungary) Andrea Temesvári (United States) Barbara Potter
18 Feb	Virginia Slims of California; Oakland, United States; Carpet (i) – $150,000 – 28S/16D/32Q	(Czechoslovakia) Hana Mandlíková; 6–2, 6–4	(United States) Chris Evert-Lloyd	(United States) Zina Garrison (Czechoslovakia) Helena Suková	(West Germany) Claudia Kohde-Kilsch (United States) Barbara Potter (Hungary) Andrea Temesvári (Australia) Wendy Turnbull
18 Feb	Virginia Slims of California; Oakland, United States; Carpet (i) – $150,000 – 28S/16D/32Q	(Czechoslovakia) Hana Mandlíková (Australia) Wendy Turnbull; 4–6, 7–5, 6–1	(South Africa) Rosalyn Fairbank (United States) Candy Reynolds	(United States) Zina Garrison (Czechoslovakia) Helena Suková	(West Germany) Claudia Kohde-Kilsch (United States) Barbara Potter (Hungary) Andrea Temesvári (Australia) Wendy Turnbull
25 Feb	Virginia Slims of Pennsylvania; Hershey, United States; Hard (i) – $75,000 – 32S/16D	(United States) Robin White; 6–7, 6–2, 6–2	(Australia) Anne Minter	(United States) Camille Benjamin (United States) Peanut Louie	(United States) Stephanie Rehe (United States) Wendy White (Czechoslovakia) Marcela Skuherská (Australia) Elizabeth Smylie
25 Feb	Virginia Slims of Pennsylvania; Hershey, United States; Hard (i) – $75,000 – 32S/16D	(United States) Mary Lou Piatek (United States) Robin White; 6–4, 7–6	(United States) Lea Antonoplis (United States) Wendy White	(United States) Camille Benjamin (United States) Peanut Louie	(United States) Stephanie Rehe (United States) Wendy White (Czechoslovakia) Marcela Skuherská (Australia) Elizabeth Smylie

=== March 1985 ===
Week	Tournament	Champions	Runners-up	Semifinalists	Quarterfinalists
4 Mar	US Indoors; Princeton, United States; Carpet (i) – $150,000 – 32S/16D/32Q	(Czechoslovakia) Hana Mandlíková; 6–3, 7–5	(Sweden) Catarina Lindqvist	(United States) Martina Navratilova (France) Catherine Tanvier	(United States) Gigi Fernández (West Germany) Sylvia Hanika (United States) Pam Shriver (Australia) Wendy Turnbull
4 Mar	US Indoors; Princeton, United States; Carpet (i) – $150,000 – 32S/16D/32Q	(United States) Martina Navratilova (United States) Pam Shriver; 7–5, 6–2	(Netherlands) Marcella Mesker (Australia) Elizabeth Smylie	(United States) Martina Navratilova (France) Catherine Tanvier	(United States) Gigi Fernández (West Germany) Sylvia Hanika (United States) Pam Shriver (Australia) Wendy Turnbull
4 Mar	Virginia Slims of Indianapolis; Indianapolis, United States; Hard – $75,000 – 32S/16D/64Q	(United States) Kathleen Horvath; 6–2, 6–4	(United States) Elise Burgin	(United States) Bonnie Gadusek (United States) Betsy Nagelsen	(United States) Lea Antonoplis (United States) Jenny Klitch (Canada) Helen Kelesi (United States) JoAnne Russell
4 Mar	Virginia Slims of Indianapolis; Indianapolis, United States; Hard – $75,000 – 32S/16D/64Q	(United States) Elise Burgin (United States) Kathleen Horvath; 6–4, 6–1	(South Africa) Jennifer Mundel (United States) Molly Van Nostrand	(United States) Bonnie Gadusek (United States) Betsy Nagelsen	(United States) Lea Antonoplis (United States) Jenny Klitch (Canada) Helen Kelesi (United States) JoAnne Russell
11 Mar	Virginia Slims of Dallas; Dallas, United States; Carpet (i) – $150,000 – 32S/16D/32Q	(United States) Martina Navratilova; 6–3, 6–4	(United States) Chris Evert-Lloyd	(Czechoslovakia) Helena Suková (Sweden) Catarina Lindqvist	(West Germany) Claudia Kohde-Kilsch (West Germany) Bettina Bunge (West Germany) Myriam Schropp; (United States) Bonnie Gadusek
11 Mar	Virginia Slims of Dallas; Dallas, United States; Carpet (i) – $150,000 – 32S/16D/32Q	(United States) Barbara Potter (United States) Sharon Walsh; 5–7, 6–4, 7–6	(Netherlands) Marcella Mesker (France) Pascale Paradis	(Czechoslovakia) Helena Suková (Sweden) Catarina Lindqvist	(West Germany) Claudia Kohde-Kilsch (West Germany) Bettina Bunge (West Germany) Myriam Schropp; (United States) Bonnie Gadusek
18 Mar	Virginia Slims Championships; New York City, United States; Carpet (i) – $500,000 – 16S/8D; Singles – Doubles	(United States) Martina Navratilova; 6–3, 7–5, 6–4	(Czechoslovakia) Helena Suková	(Czechoslovakia) Hana Mandlíková (United States) Kathy Rinaldi	(United States) Pam Shriver (United States) Zina Garrison (Sweden) Catarina Lindqvist (United States) Kathy Jordan
18 Mar	Virginia Slims Championships; New York City, United States; Carpet (i) – $500,000 – 16S/8D; Singles – Doubles	(United States) Martina Navratilova (United States) Pam Shriver; 6–7, 6–4, 7–6	(West Germany) Claudia Kohde-Kilsch (Czechoslovakia) Helena Suková	(Czechoslovakia) Hana Mandlíková (United States) Kathy Rinaldi	(United States) Pam Shriver (United States) Zina Garrison (Sweden) Catarina Lindqvist (United States) Kathy Jordan
18 Mar	Brazil Open; São Paulo, Brazil; Clay – $50,000 – 32S/16D/32Q	(Argentina) Mercedes Paz; 5–7, 6–1, 6–4	(Peru) Laura Arraya	(Argentina) Gabriela Sabatini (Brazil) Pat Madrado	(Argentina) Adriana Villagrán (Greece) Angelikí Kanellopoúlou (United States) Amy Holton (United Kingdom) Rina Einy
18 Mar	Brazil Open; São Paulo, Brazil; Clay – $50,000 – 32S/16D/32Q	(Argentina) Mercedes Paz (Argentina) Gabriela Sabatini; 7–5, 6–4	(Brazil) Neige Dias (Hungary) Csilla Bartos	(Argentina) Gabriela Sabatini (Brazil) Pat Madrado	(Argentina) Adriana Villagrán (Greece) Angelikí Kanellopoúlou (United States) Amy Holton (United Kingdom) Rina Einy

== Rankings ==
=== Singles ===
As of 11 December 1983
Rk	Name	Nation	Points
1	Martina Navratilova	USA	19.49
2	Chris Evert	USA	15.17
3	Andrea Jaeger	USA	11.95
4	Pam Shriver	USA	10.34
5	Sylvia Hanika	FRG	10.01
6	Jo Durie	GBR	9.19
7	Bettina Bunge	FRG	9.18
8	Wendy Turnbull	AUS	9.18
9	Tracy Austin	USA	9.05
10	Zina Garrison	USA	8.99

Final rankings as of (December 1984)
Rk	Name	Nation	Points	High	Low	Change
1	Martina Navratilova	USA	192.72	1	1	NC
2	Chris Evert	USA	151.14			NC
3	Hana Mandlíková	TCH	68.40			NR
4	Pam Shriver	USA	64.84			NC
5	Wendy Turnbull	AUS	62.73			+3
6	Manuela Maleeva	BUL	58.03			NR
7	Helena Suková	TCH	56.11			NR
8	Claudia Kohde-Kilsch	FRG	55.17			NR
9	Zina Garrison	USA	49.46			+1
10	Kathy Jordan	USA	45.22			NR

== Statistical information ==
=== Titles won by player ===
These tables present the number of singles (S), doubles (D), and mixed doubles (X) titles won by each player and each nation during the season, within all the tournament categories of the 1984 Virginia Slims World Championship Series: the Grand Slam tournaments, the Year-end championships and regular events. The players/nations are sorted by:

1. total number of titles (a doubles title won by two players representing the same nation counts as only one win for the nation);
2. highest amount of highest category tournaments (for example, having a single Grand Slam gives preference over any kind of combination without a Grand Slam title);
3. a singles > doubles > mixed doubles hierarchy;
4. alphabetical order (by family names for players).

Total titles	Player	Grand Slam tournaments			Year-end championships		Regular tournaments		All titles		
Total titles	Player	Singles	Doubles	Mixed	Singles	Doubles	Singles	Doubles	Singles	Doubles	Mixed
25	(United States) Martina Navratilova	3	4		1	1	9	7	13	12	
8	(Czechoslovakia) Hana Mandlíková						5	3	5	3	
14	(United States) Pam Shriver		4			1	2	7	2	12	
7	(United States) Chris Evert	1					5	1	6	1	
6	(Bulgaria) Manuela Maleeva			1			5		5		1
4	(United States) Anne White							4		4	
6	(West Germany) Claudia Kohde-Kilsch						1	5	1	5	
3	(Netherlands) Marcella Mesker							3		3	
3	(United States) Sharon Walsh							3		3	
2	(Italy) Sandra Cecchini						2		2		
2	(United Kingdom) Anne Hobbs							2		2	
2	(Switzerland) Christiane Jolissaint							2		2	
2	(United States) Barbara Potter							2		2	
3	(United States) Candy Reynolds							3		3	
2	(United States) Leslie Allen							2		2	
6	(Czechoslovakia) Helena Suková						1	5	1	5	
1	(United States) Michelle Casati						1		1		
1	(United States) Mary Lou Daniels						1		1		
1	(United States) Bonnie Gadusek						1		1		
1	(United States) Zina Garrison						1		1		
1	(Peru) Laura Gildemeister						1		1		
1	(West Germany) Sylvia Hanika						1		1		
1	(Japan) Etsuko Inoue						1		1		
1	(Switzerland) Lilian Drescher						1		1		
1	(United States) Jenny Klitch						1		1		
1	(United States) Andrea Leand						1		1		
4	(Sweden) Catarina Lindqvist						3	1	3	1	
2	(United States) JoAnne Russell						2		2		
1	(United States) Debbie Spence						1		1		
1	(United States) Sherry Acker							1		1	
1	(Canada) Carling Bassett							1		1	
1	(Czechoslovakia) Kateřina Böhmová							1		1	
1	(Czechoslovakia) Iva Budařová							1		1	
1	(South Africa) Rosalyn Fairbank							1		1	
1	(United States) Anna-Maria Fernandez							1		1	
1	(Socialist Federal Republic of Yugoslavia) Sabrina Goleš							1		1	
1	(Canada) Jill Hetherington							1		1	
1	(Austria) Petra Huber							1		1	
1	(Socialist Federal Republic of Yugoslavia) Mima Jaušovec							1		1	
2	(United States) Kathy Jordan							2		2	
1	(United States) Billie Jean King							1		1	
1	(United States) Ann Kiyomura							1		1	
1	(United States) Peanut Louie							1		1	
1	(Australia) Anne Minter							1		1	
2	(Australia) Elizabeth Minter							2		2	
1	(Brazil) Cláudia Monteiro							1		1	
2	(South Africa) Beverly Mould							2		2	
1	(United States) Alycia Moulton							1		1	
4	(United States) Betsy Nagelsen							4		4	
1	(Argentina) Mercedes Paz							1		1	
1	(Canada) Hélène Pelletier							1		1	
1	(United States) Ronni Reis							1		1	
1	(Czechoslovakia) Marcela Skuherská							1		1	
1	(United States) Anne Smith			1				1		1	1
3	(Australia) Elizabeth Smylie							3		3	
4	(United States) Paula Smith							4		4	
1	(Hungary) Andrea Temesvári							1		1	
2	(South Africa) Yvonne Vermaak						1	1	1	1	
2	(Australia) Wendy Turnbull			1				1		1	1

=== Titles won by nation ===
Total titles	Country	Grand Slam tournaments			Year-end championships		Regular tournaments		All titles		
Total titles	Country	Singles	Doubles	Mixed	Singles	Doubles	Singles	Doubles	Singles	Doubles	Mixed
65	United States	4	4	1	1	1	25	29	30	34	1
12	Czechoslovakia						6	6	6	6	
7	Australia			1				6		6	1
5	Bulgaria			1			4		4		1
5	Germany						2	3	2	3	
5	South Africa						1	4	1	4	
3	Switzerland						1	2	1	2	
3	Netherlands							3		3	
2	Italy						2		2		
2	Brazil							2		2	
2	United Kingdom							2		2	
2	Yugoslavia							2		2	
1	Japan						1		1		
1	Peru						1		1		
1	Sweden						2		2		
1	Argentina					1				1	
1	Austria							1		1	
2	Canada							2		2	
1	Hungary							1		1	

The following players won their first title in singles (S), doubles (D) or mixed doubles (X):

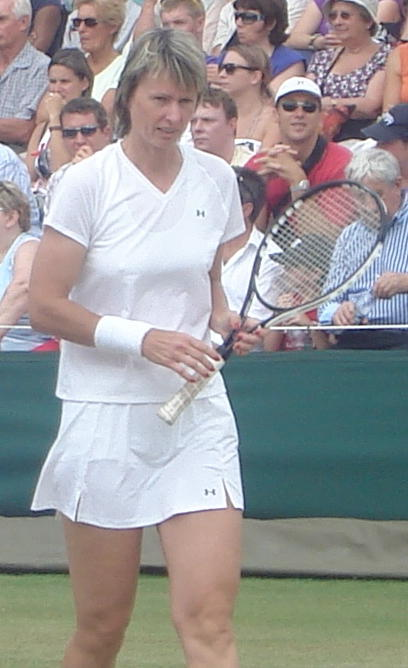
Helena Suková collected her first career doubles title in Marco Island, Florida.

- (United States) Jenny Klitch – Nashville (S)
- (United States) Sherry Acker – Nashville (D)
- (Sweden) Catarina Lindqvist – Pennsylvania (S)
- (Czechoslovakia) Marcela Skuherská – Pennsylvania (D)
- (United States) Bonnie Gadusek – Marco Island (S)
- (Czechoslovakia) Helena Suková – Marco Island (D)
- (United States) Andrea Leand – Pittsburgh (S), Zurich (D)
- (United States) JoAnne Russell – Indianapolis (S)
- (Italy) Sandra Cecchini – Taranto (S)
- (Socialist Federal Republic of Yugoslavia) Sabrina Goleš – Taranto (D)
- (Austria) Petra Huber – Taranto (D)
- (Czechoslovakia) Iva Budařová – Perugia (D)
- (Bulgaria) Manuela Maleeva – Lugano (S)
- (Canada) Hélène Pelletier – Rio de Janeiro (D)
- (Canada) Jill Hetherington – Rio de Janeiro (D)
- (United States) Anna-Maria Fernandez – Newport (D)
- (United States) Debbie Spence – San Diego (S)
- (United States) Michelle Casati – Tampa (S)
- (Switzerland) Lilian Drescher – Japan Open (S)
- (United States) Zina Garrison – Zurich (S)
- (Australia) Anne Minter – Salt Lake City (D)
- (Australia) Elizabeth Minter – Salt Lake City (D)
- (Argentina) Mercedes Paz – Borden Classic (D)
- (United States) Ronni Reis – Borden Classic (D)
- (Canada) Carling Bassett – Tampa (D)
- (Hungary) Andrea Temesvári – Zurich (D)

The following players mounted a successful title defence in singles (S), doubles (D) or mixed doubles (X):

- (United States) Martina Navratilova – Orlando (S), VS Masters (S, D), Eastbourne (S, D), Wimbledon (S, D), US Open (S, D), Australian Open (D)
- (United States) Candy Reynolds – Nashville (D)
- (Switzerland) Christiane Jolissaint – Lugano (D)
- (Netherlands) Marcella Mesker – Lugano (D)
- (United Kingdom) Anne Hobbs – Berlin (D)
- (United States) Pam Shriver – VS Masters (D), Eastbourne (D), Wimbledon (D), US Open (D), Australian Open (D)
- (South Africa) Yvonne Vermaak – Salt Lake City (S)
- (Australia) Wendy Turnbull – Wimbledon (X)

== Awards ==
The winners of the 1984 WTA Awards were announced in 1985.

- Player of the Year: Martina Navratilova
- Doubles Team of the Year: Martina Navratilova & Pam Shriver
- Most Improved Player: Kathy Jordan
- Newcomer of the Year: Manuela Maleeva
- Player Service: Kim Shaefer
- Karen Krantzcke Sportsmanship Award: Marcella Mesker

== Retirements ==
The following notable players announced their retirement from women's tennis in 1984:

- (Romania) Florența Mihai
- (United Kingdom) Sue Barker

== See also ==
- 1984 Volvo Grand Prix – men's circuit
- Women's Tennis Association
- International Tennis Federation
