= 1984 Edgbaston Cup – Doubles =

Doubles
- 1984 Edgbaston Cup

Final
- Champions: (United States) Leslie Allen (United States) Anne White
- Runners-up: (United States) Barbara Jordan (Australia) Elizabeth Sayers
- Score: 7–5, 6–3

Details
- Draw: 32
- Seeds: 8

Events
Singles	Doubles
- Birmingham Classic

Billie Jean King and Sharon Walsh were the defending champions, but King chose to compete at Eastbourne during the same week, reaching the quarterfinals alongside Rosie Casals. Walsh teamed up with Anne Hobbs and lost in the quarterfinals to Barbara Jordan and Elizabeth Sayers.

Leslie Allen and Anne White won the title by defeating Jordan and Sayers 7–5, 6–3 in the final.

== Seeds ==
1. (United Kingdom) Anne Hobbs / (United States) Sharon Walsh (quarterfinals)
2. (South Africa) Rosalyn Fairbank / (United States) Candy Reynolds (semifinals)
3. (United States) Elise Burgin / (United States) JoAnne Russell (semifinals)
4. (United States) Leslie Allen / (United States) Anne White (champions)
5. (United States) Barbara Jordan / (Australia) Elizabeth Sayers (final)
6. (United States) Paula Smith / (United States) Wendy White (quarterfinals)
7. (Brazil) Cláudia Monteiro / (South Africa) Yvonne Vermaak (quarterfinals)
8. (United States) Gigi Fernández / (United States) Alycia Moulton (second round, retired)

== Draw ==
Key

- Q = Qualifier
- WC = Wild card
- LL = Lucky loser
- Alt = Alternate
- ITF = ITF entry
- PR = Protected ranking
- SR = Special ranking
- SE = Special exempt
- JE = Junior exempt
- JR = Junior Accelerator Programme entrant
- CO = College Accelerator Programme entrant
- NG = Next Gen Accelerator Program entrant
- w/o = Walkover
- r = Retired
- d = Defaulted

=== Finals ===
Semifinals
5	(United States) Barbara Jordan (Australia) Elizabeth Sayers	7	6
3	(United States) Elise Burgin (United States) JoAnne Russell	6	3
4	(United States) Leslie Allen (United States) Anne White	7	6
2	(South Africa) Rosalyn Fairbank (United States) Candy Reynolds	6	4

Final
5	(United States) Barbara Jordan (Australia) Elizabeth Sayers	5	3
4	(United States) Leslie Allen (United States) Anne White	7	6

=== Top half ===
First round
1	(United Kingdom) A Hobbs (United States) S Walsh	6	6
(United States) T Phelps (United States) M Torres	2	2
(United States) K Copeland (United States) H Manset	4	2
(United Kingdom) S Gomer (United Kingdom) J Salmon	6	6
(United States) A Henricksson (United States) N Yeargin	6	1
(United States) S Collins (United States) P Teeguarden	7	6
(United States) L McNeil (United States) G Rush	5	2
5	(United States) B Jordan (Australia) E Sayers	7	6
3	(United States) E Burgin (United States) J Russell	6	4	6
(United States) H Crowe (United States) K Steinmetz	3	6	3
(Australia) A Minter (United States) G Purdy	2	2
(United States) L Antonoplis (South Africa) B Mould	6	6
(United States) J Newberry (Australia) P Whytcross	7	6
(United States) K Sands (France) C Vanier	6	4
(United States) R Blount (United States) K Latham	6	5	3
8	(United States) G Fernández (United States) A Moulton	4	7	6

Second round
1	(United Kingdom) A Hobbs (United States) S Walsh	7	6
(United Kingdom) S Gomer (United Kingdom) J Salmon	6	3
(United States) S Collins (United States) P Teeguarden	7	3	2
5	(United States) B Jordan (Australia) E Sayers	6	6	6
3	(United States) E Burgin (United States) J Russell	6	6
(United States) L Antonoplis (South Africa) B Mould	3	4
(United States) J Newberry (Australia) P Whytcross	6	1
8	(United States) G Fernández (United States) A Moulton	2	0^{r}

Quarterfinals
1	(United Kingdom) A Hobbs (United States) S Walsh	3	3
5	(United States) B Jordan (Australia) E Sayers	6	6
3	(United States) E Burgin (United States) J Russell	7	7
(United States) J Newberry (Australia) P Whytcross	6	6

Semifinals
5	(United States) B Jordan (Australia) E Sayers	7	6
3	(United States) E Burgin (United States) J Russell	6	3

=== Bottom half ===
First round
7	(Brazil) C Monteiro (South Africa) Y Vermaak	6	6
(Switzerland) L Drescher (Japan) E Inoue	0	0
(United States) T Holladay (United States) K Shaefer	6	7
(West Germany) S Graf (Romania) L Romanov	2	6
(South Africa) J Mundel (South Africa) R Uys	5	7	3
(United Kingdom) A Brown (United States) AM Fernandez	7	5	6
(Australia) B Remilton (Japan) N Sato	0	4
4	(United States) Le Allen (United States) A White	6	6
6	(United States) P Smith (United States) W White	6	6
(United States) L Bernstein (Australia) N Gregory	1	2
(United States) C Benjamin (United States) Z Garrison	6	7
(United States) P Casale (United States) ML Piatek	1	6
(Poland) I Kuczyńska (Australia) S Leo	6	6
(United States) K Rinaldi (United States) M Van Nostrand	2	3
(France) S Amiach (United States) H Ludloff	3	4
2	(South Africa) R Fairbank (United States) C Reynolds	6	6

Second round
7	(Brazil) C Monteiro (South Africa) Y Vermaak	6	6
(United States) T Holladay (United States) K Shaefer	1	0
(United Kingdom) A Brown (United States) AM Fernandez
4	(United States) Le Allen (United States) A White	w/o
6	(United States) P Smith (United States) W White	3	6	6
(United States) C Benjamin (United States) Z Garrison	6	3	2
(Poland) I Kuczyńska (Australia) S Leo	4	3
2	(South Africa) R Fairbank (United States) C Reynolds	6	6

Quarterfinals
7	(Brazil) C Monteiro (South Africa) Y Vermaak	1	4
4	(United States) Le Allen (United States) A White	6	6
6	(United States) P Smith (United States) W White	4	4
2	(South Africa) R Fairbank (United States) C Reynolds	6	6

Semifinals
4	(United States) Le Allen (United States) A White	7	6
2	(South Africa) R Fairbank (United States) C Reynolds	6	4
