= 1984 Lion's Cup =

Tennis tournament

- Date: November 12–18
- Edition: 7th
- Surface: Carpet / indoor
- Location: Tokyo, Japan

Champions

Singles
- (Bulgaria) Manuela Maleeva
← 1983 ·	Lion's Cup	· 1985 →

The 1984 Lion's Cup was a women's tennis tournament played on indoor carpet courts in Tokyo, Japan that was part of the 1984 Virginia Slims World Championship Series. The tournament was held from November 12 through November 18, 1984.

== Finals ==
=== Singles ===
(Bulgaria) Manuela Maleeva defeated (Czechoslovakia) Hana Mandlíková 6–1, 1–6, 6–4

- It was Maleeva's 4th singles title of the year and of her career.
