= 1984 Virginia Slims of Newport – Singles =

Singles
- 1984 Virginia Slims of Newport

Final
- Champion: (United States) Martina Navratilova
- Runner-up: (United States) Gigi Fernández
- Score: 6–3, 7–6^{(7–3)}

Details
- Draw: 32 (4Q/1LL)
- Seeds: 8

Events
Singles	Doubles
- Virginia Slims of Newport

The 1984 Virginia Slims of Newport singles was the singles event of the sixth edition of the Virginia Slims of Newport; a tennis tournament held in Newport, Rhode Island, United States, played on grass. It was part of the 1984 season of the Virginia Slims World Championship Series, currently the WTA Tour.

Alycia Moulton was the defending champion, but lost in the second round to Anne Minter.

Martina Navratilova won the title by defeating Gigi Fernández 6–3, 7–6^{(7–3)} in the final.

== Seeds ==
1. (United States) Martina Navratilova (champion)
2. (n/a)
3. (Australia) Wendy Turnbull (second round)
4. (United States) Kimberly Shaefer (first round)
5. (Netherlands) Marcella Mesker (second round)
6. (United States) Alycia Moulton (second round)
7. (South Africa) Rosalyn Fairbank (semifinals)
8. (United States) Wendy White (quarterfinals)

== Draw ==
Key

- Q = Qualifier
- WC = Wild card
- LL = Lucky loser
- Alt = Alternate
- ITF = ITF entry
- PR = Protected ranking
- SR = Special ranking
- SE = Special exempt
- JE = Junior exempt
- JR = Junior Accelerator Programme entrant
- CO = College Accelerator Programme entrant
- NG = Next Gen Accelerator Program entrant
- w/o = Walkover
- r = Retired
- d = Defaulted

=== Finals ===
Semifinals
1	(United States) Martina Navratilova	6	6
(Australia) Anne Minter	1	1
7	(South Africa) Rosalyn Fairbank	3	6	3
LL	(United States) Gigi Fernández	6	3	6

Final
1	(United States) Martina Navratilova	6	7^{7}
LL	(United States) Gigi Fernández	3	6^{3}

=== Top half ===
First round
1	(United States) M Navratilova	6	6
(South Africa) J Mundel	1	2
(United States) S Acker	6	2	4
(United States) G Kim	1	6	6
(United States) B Nagelsen	5	2
(United States) J Golder	7	6
(United States) K Cummings	1	1
8	(United States) W White	6	6
4	(United States) K Shaefer	4	2
Q	(United States) L Antonoplis	6	6
(United States) T Holladay	6	2
(United States) L Spain	7	6
(United States) L McNeil	6	2
(Australia) A Minter	7	6
(United States) T Mochizuki	6	3	1
6	(United States) A Moulton	4	6	6

Second round
1	(United States) M Navratilova	6	6
(United States) G Kim	0	0
(United States) J Golder	1	2
8	(United States) W White	6	6
Q	(United States) L Antonoplis	4	7	6
(United States) L Spain	6	5	3
(Australia) A Minter	7	6
6	(United States) A Moulton	5	4

Quarterfinals
1	(United States) M Navratilova	6	6
8	(United States) W White	0	3
Q	(United States) L Antonoplis	6	6
(Australia) A Minter	7	7

Semifinals
1	(United States) M Navratilova	6	6
(Australia) A Minter	1	1

=== Bottom half ===
First round
7	(South Africa) R Fairbank	6	6
(United States) K Sands	0	2
(United States) P Teeguarden	6	6
Q	(Australia) S Leo	3	4
(United States) Le Allen	3	1
Q	(South Africa) B Mould	6	6
(United States) A Henricksson	3	4
3	(Australia) W Turnbull	6	6
5	(Netherlands) M Mesker	6	6
(France) C Vanier	1	4
Q	(United States) K Steinmetz	6	6
(United States) L Forood	0	3
(United States) T Phelps	7	5	3
(United States) P Louie	6	7	6
(United States) P Smith	1	7	2
LL	(United States) G Fernández	6	6	6

Second round
7	(South Africa) R Fairbank	6	6
(United States) P Teeguarden	1	1
Q	(South Africa) B Mould	4	6	6
3	(Australia) W Turnbull	6	2	3
5	(Netherlands) M Mesker	6	3	6
Q	(United States) K Steinmetz	2	6	7
(United States) P Louie	4	3
LL	(United States) G Fernández	6	6

Quarterfinals
7	(South Africa) R Fairbank	6	6
Q	(South Africa) B Mould	3	2
Q	(United States) K Steinmetz	5	0
LL	(United States) G Fernández	7	6

Semifinals
7	(South Africa) R Fairbank	3	6	3
LL	(United States) G Fernández	6	3	6
