= WTA Tokyo =

WTA Tokyo can refer to any Women's Tennis Association tournament held in Tokyo, Japan:

- Toray Pan Pacific Open, a Tier I event first held in 1984
- Japan Open Tennis Championships, a Tier III event held in 1979
- Japan Women's Open, a WTA International event first held in Tokyo in 2015
- (Nichirei) Tokyo International, a Tier II event held from 1990 to 1996
- Toyota Princess Cup, a Tier II event held from 1997 to 2002
- Lion's Cup, an event held from 1978 to 1985.
