= 1985 Virginia Slims of Indianapolis (March) =

- Date: March 4–10
- Edition: 5th
- Draw: 32S / 16D
- Prize money: $75,000
- Surface: Hard / indoor
- Location: Indianapolis, Indiana, U.S.
- Venue: Indianapolis Racquet Club

Champions

Singles
- (United States) Kathy Horvath

Doubles
- (United States) Elise Burgin / (United States) Kathy Horvath
- Virginia Slims of Indianapolis

The 1985 Virginia Slims of Indianapolis was a women's tennis tournament played on indoor hard courts at the Indianapolis Racquet Club in Indianapolis, Indiana in the United States and was part of the 1984 Virginia Slims World Championship Series (Note: The 1984 Virginia Slims World Championship Series ran from March 1984 through March 1985.). It was the fifth edition of the tournament and ran from March 4 through March 10, 1985. Third-seeded Kathy Horvath won the singles title.

== Finals ==
=== Singles ===
(United States) Kathy Horvath defeated (United States) Elise Burgin 6–2, 6–4

- It was Horvath's 1st singles title of the year and the 4th of her career.

=== Doubles ===
(United States) Elise Burgin / (United States) Kathy Horvath defeated (South Africa) Jennifer Mundel / (United States) Molly Van Nostrand 6–4, 6–1
