= 1983 Lion's Cup – Singles =

Singles
- 1983 Lion's Cup

Final
- Champion: (United States) Martina Navratilova
- Runner-up: (United States) Chris Evert Lloyd
- Score: 6–2, 6–2

Details
- Draw: 4

Events
Singles
- Lion's Cup

Chris Evert Lloyd was the defending champion, but lost in the final to Martina Navratilova. The score was 6–2, 6–2.

== Draw ==
Semifinals
(United States) Martina Navratilova	6	6
(Hungary) Andrea Temesvári	3	3
(United States) Andrea Jaeger	1	5
(United States) Chris Evert Lloyd	6	7

Final
(United States) Martina Navratilova	6	6
(United States) Chris Evert Lloyd	2	2
Third place match
(Hungary) Andrea Temesvári	6	6
(United States) Andrea Jaeger	2	2
