= 1984 Miami Classic – Doubles =

Doubles
- 1984 Miami Classic

Final
- Champions: (Brazil) Patricia Medrado (South Africa) Yvonne Vermaak
- Runners-up: (United States) Kate Latham (United States) Janet Wright
- Score: 6–3, 6–3

Details
- Draw: 16
- Seeds: 4

Events
Singles	Doubles
Miami Classic

Patricia Medrado and Yvonne Vermaak won the title by defeating Kate Latham and Janet Wright 6–3, 6–3 in the final.

== Seeds ==
1. (United States) Betsy Nagelsen / (United States) Candy Reynolds (semifinals, withdrew)
2. (Brazil) Patricia Medrado / (South Africa) Yvonne Vermaak (champions)
3. (United States) Anna-Maria Fernandez / (United States) Kim Sands (first round)
4. (Czechoslovakia) Yvona Brzáková / (Czechoslovakia) Marcela Skuherská (quarterfinals)

== Draw ==
=== Key ===
- Q = Qualifier
- WC = Wild card
- LL = Lucky loser
- Alt = Alternate
- ITF = ITF entry
- PR = Protected ranking
- SR = Special ranking
- SE = Special exempt
- JE = Junior exempt
- JR = Junior Accelerator Programme entrant
- CO = College Accelerator Programme entrant
- NG = Next Gen Accelerator Program entrant
- w/o = Walkover
- r = Retired
- d = Defaulted

=== Draw ===
First round
1	(United States) B Nagelsen (United States) C Reynolds	6	6
(Peru) L Gildemeister (Argentina) E Raponi Longo	4	3
(Romania) L Romanov (Romania) Maria Romanov	6	6
(Chile) Carolina Espinoza (Peru) Magdalena Wiese	1	4
3	(United States) AM Fernandez (United States) K Sands	4	4
(United States) H Manset (United States) M Schillig	6	6
(United States) V Nelson-Dunbar (Peru) P Vásquez	6	4	3
(United States) K Latham (United States) J Wright	4	6	6
(Socialist Federal Republic of Yugoslavia) S Goleš (Denmark) T Scheuer-Larsen	2	6	2
(United States) A Henricksson (United States) N Yeargin	6	4	6
(France) S Amiach (Australia) S Leo	4	6	3
4	(Czechoslovakia) Y Brzáková (Czechoslovakia) M Skuherská	6	2	6
(United States) H Crowe (Australia) B Remilton	6	6
(United Kingdom) A Brown (South Africa) J Mundel	4	2
(United States) A Holton (United States) Kathy Holton	2	4
2	(Brazil) P Medrado (South Africa) Y Vermaak	6	6

Quarterfinals
1	(United States) B Nagelsen (United States) C Reynolds	6	6
(Romania) L Romanov (Romania) M Romanov	4	4
(United States) H Manset (United States) M Schillig	2	3
(United States) K Latham (United States) J Wright	6	6
(United States) A Henricksson (United States) N Yeargin	6	6
4	(Czechoslovakia) Y Brzáková (Czechoslovakia) M Skuherská	1	2
(United States) H Crowe (Australia) B Remilton	1	6	5
2	(Brazil) P Medrado (South Africa) Y Vermaak	6	4	7

Semifinals
1	(United States) B Nagelsen (United States) C Reynolds
(United States) K Latham (United States) J Wright	w/o
(United States) A Henricksson (United States) N Yeargin	6	6	6
2	(Brazil) P Medrado (South Africa) Y Vermaak	4	7	7

Final
(United States) K Latham (United States) J Wright	3	3
2	(Brazil) P Medrado (South Africa) Y Vermaak	6	6
