= 1984 Eastbourne International – Singles =

Singles
- 1984 Eastbourne International

Final
- Champion: (United States) Martina Navratilova
- Runner-up: (United States) Kathy Jordan
- Score: 6–4, 6–1

Details
- Draw: 64 (7Q/2LL)
- Seeds: 16

Events
Singles	Doubles
- Eastbourne International

Martina Navratilova won her third consecutive title at Eastbourne, by defeating Kathy Jordan 6–4, 6–1 in the final.

== Seeds ==
1. (United States) Martina Navratilova (champion)
2. (United States) Chris Evert-Lloyd (semifinals)
3. (United States) Zina Garrison (third round)
4. (United States) Kathy Jordan (final)
5. (Australia) Wendy Turnbull (quarterfinals)
6. (United Kingdom) Jo Durie (second round)
7. (United States) Lisa Bonder (first round)
8. (West Germany) Claudia Kohde-Kilsch (semifinals)
9. (United States) Barbara Potter (quarterfinals)
10. (Czechoslovakia) Helena Suková (quarterfinals)
11. (Canada) Carling Bassett (third round)
12. (West Germany) Sylvia Hanika (first round)
13. (Peru) Laura Arraya (third round)
14. (West Germany) Eva Pfaff (first round)
15. (United States) Pam Casale (third round)
16. (United States) Andrea Leand (first round)

== Draw ==
Key

- Q = Qualifier
- WC = Wild card
- LL = Lucky loser
- Alt = Alternate
- ITF = ITF entry
- PR = Protected ranking
- SR = Special ranking
- SE = Special exempt
- JE = Junior exempt
- JR = Junior Accelerator Programme entrant
- CO = College Accelerator Programme entrant
- NG = Next Gen Accelerator Program entrant
- w/o = Walkover
- r = Retired
- d = Defaulted

=== Finals ===
Quarterfinals
1	(United States) Martina Navratilova	6	6
5	(Australia) Wendy Turnbull	3	2
9	(United States) Barbara Potter	4	4
8	(West Germany) Claudia Kohde-Kilsch	6	6
(United States) Terry Phelps	3	3
4	(United States) Kathy Jordan	6	6
10	(Czechoslovakia) Helena Suková	2	6
2	(United States) Chris Evert-Lloyd	6	7

Semifinals
1	(United States) Martina Navratilova	4	6	6
8	(West Germany) Claudia Kohde-Kilsch	6	1	4
4	(United States) Kathy Jordan	6	6
2	(United States) Chris Evert-Lloyd	2	4

Final
1	(United States) Martina Navratilova	6	6
4	(United States) Kathy Jordan	4	1

=== Top half ===
==== Section 1 ====
First round
1	(United States) M Navratilova	6	6
LL	(United States) A Kiyomura	2	4
(United States) W White	2	6	6
(United Kingdom) A Hobbs	6	4	2
(United States) P Louie	2	3
(United States) A Moulton	6	6
(Socialist Federal Republic of Yugoslavia) M Jaušovec	1	2
11	(Canada) C Bassett	6	6
16	(United States) A Leand	6	3	0
(Switzerland) C Jolissaint	2	6	6
LL	(France) C Vanier	6	6
(Italy) S Cecchini	4	0
(Australia) E Sayers	3	1
Q	(United States) G Rush	6	6
Q	(Australia) S Leo	1	1
5	(Australia) W Turnbull	6	6

Second round
1	(United States) M Navratilova	6	6
(United States) W White	2	3
(United States) A Moulton	2	6	5
11	(Canada) C Bassett	6	3	7
(Switzerland) C Jolissaint	6	6
LL	(France) C Vanier	3	4
Q	(United States) G Rush	6	3	5
5	(Australia) W Turnbull	4	6	7

Third round
1	(United States) M Navratilova	6	6
11	(Canada) C Bassett	1	3
(Switzerland) C Jolissaint	2	0
5	(Australia) W Turnbull	6	6

Quarterfinals
1	(United States) M Navratilova	6	6
5	(Australia) W Turnbull	3	2

==== Section 2 ====
First round
3	(United States) Z Garrison	6	6
(South Africa) Y Vermaak	1	0
(Italy) R Reggi	6	6
(United States) M Brown	2	4
(United States) M Torres	6	5
(Japan) E Inoue	7	7
(France) C Suire	3	2
9	(United States) B Potter	6	6
14	(West Germany) E Pfaff	3	3
(United States) E Burgin	6	6
(Netherlands) M Mesker	6	2
(United Kingdom) A Croft	7	6
(Brazil) P Medrado	2	0
(United Kingdom) A Brown	6	6
(West Germany) B Bunge	6	1
8	(West Germany) C Kohde-Kilsch	7	6

Second round
3	(United States) Z Garrison	6	6
(Italy) R Reggi	2	3
(Japan) E Inoue	1	4
9	(United States) B Potter	6	6
(United States) E Burgin	3	5
(United Kingdom) A Croft	6	7
(United Kingdom) A Brown	2	2
8	(West Germany) C Kohde-Kilsch	6	6

Third round
3	(United States) Z Garrison	4	3
9	(United States) B Potter	6	6
(United Kingdom) A Croft	7	4	5
8	(West Germany) C Kohde-Kilsch	5	6	7

Quarterfinals
9	(United States) B Potter	4	4
8	(West Germany) C Kohde-Kilsch	6	6

=== Bottom half ===
==== Section 3 ====
First round
7	(United States) L Bonder	4	6	4
(United States) T Phelps	6	2	6
(United States) K Sands	2	5
(United States) J Russell	6	7
(United States) B Herr	6	6
(United States) T Holladay	2	2
Q	(United States) S Mascarin	6	4	4
15	(United States) P Casale	4	6	6
12	(West Germany) S Hanika	2	6	3
(United States) ML Piatek	6	1	6
(United States) C Benjamin	4	3
(South Africa) R Uys	6	6
(United Kingdom) R Einy	1	0
(South Africa) J Mundel	6	6
(United Kingdom) V Wade	0	3
4	(United States) K Jordan	6	6

Second round
(United States) T Phelps	6	6
(United States) J Russell	3	2
(United States) B Herr	3	3
15	(United States) P Casale	6	6
(United States) ML Piatek	5	6	3
(South Africa) R Uys	7	2	6
(South Africa) J Mundel	1	3
4	(United States) K Jordan	6	6

Third round
(United States) T Phelps	6	3	7
15	(United States) P Casale	2	6	5
(South Africa) R Uys	3	6	1
4	(United States) K Jordan	6	4	6

Quarterfinals
(United States) T Phelps	3	3
4	(United States) K Jordan	6	6

==== Section 4 ====
First round
6	(United Kingdom) J Durie	6	7
(South Africa) R Fairbank	1	6
(United States) K Shaefer	7	6
(United States) S Walsh	6	3
(United States) S Collins	6	4	9
(United Kingdom) S Barker	1	6	11
Q	(United States) R White	2	1
10	(Czechoslovakia) H Suková	6	6
13	(Peru) L Arraya	6	6
(United States) Le Allen	3	1
Q	(Soviet Union) N Reva	7	6
(France) S Amiach	5	2
(United Kingdom) S Gomer	1	6	6
Q	(Australia) A Minter	6	3	3
Q	(United States) B Nagelsen	1	5
2	(United States) C Evert-Lloyd	6	7

Second round
6	(United Kingdom) J Durie	4	4
(United States) K Shaefer	6	6
(United Kingdom) S Barker	3	1
10	(Czechoslovakia) H Suková	6	6
13	(Peru) L Arraya	6	6	7
Q	(Soviet Union) N Reva	7	3	5
(United Kingdom) S Gomer	1	4
2	(United States) C Evert-Lloyd	6	6

Third round
(United States) K Shaefer	3	3
10	(Czechoslovakia) H Suková	6	6
13	(Peru) L Arraya	4	1
2	(United States) C Evert-Lloyd	6	6

Quarterfinals
10	(Czechoslovakia) H Suková	2	6
2	(United States) C Evert-Lloyd	6	7
