= 1983 Bakersfield Open =

1983 Bakersfield Tennis Open
- Date: September 26 – October 2
- Edition: 1st
- Category: Ginny Tournament Circuit
- Draw: 32S / 16D
- Prize money: $50,000
- Surface: Hard
- Location: Bakersfield, California, U.S.

Champions

Singles
- (South Africa) Jennifer Mundel-Reinbold

Doubles
- (United States) Kyle Copeland / (United States) Lori McNeil
Bakersfield Tennis Open	· 1984 →

The 1983 Bakersfield Open, also known as the Ginny of Bakersfield, was a women's tennis tournament played on outdoor hard courts in Bakersfield, California that was part of the Ginny Tournament Circuit (Note: The 1983 Ginny Tournament Circuit consisted of eight $50,000 events played between February and September, followed by a $100,000 Ginny Championships in November. All tournaments were held in the United States.) of the 1983 Virginia Slims World Championship Series. It was the inaugural edition of the tournament and was held from September 26 through October 2, 1983. Unseeded Jennifer Mundel-Reinbold won the singles title.

== Finals ==
=== Singles ===
(South Africa) Jennifer Mundel-Reinbold defeated (United States) Julie Harrington 6–4, 6–1

- It was Mundel-Reinbold's only career title.

=== Doubles ===
(United States) Kyle Copeland / (United States) Lori McNeil defeated (United States) Ann Henricksson / (Brazil) Pat Medrado 6–4, 6–3

- It was Copeland's only career title. It was McNeil's 1st career title.

== Point distribution ==
The following Virginia Slims ranking points were available for the tournament.

Event	W	F	SF	QF	Round of 16	Round of 32
Singles	85	65	45	23	13	5
Doubles	45	35	25	16	8	—
