= 1985 US Indoors =

Tennis tournament

- Date: March 4–10
- Edition: 76th
- Draw: 32S / 16D
- Prize money: $150,000
- Surface: Carpet / indoor
- Location: Princeton, New Jersey, U.S.

Champions

Singles
- (Czechoslovakia) Hana Mandlíková

Doubles
- (United States) Martina Navratilova / (United States) Pam Shriver
← 1984 ·	U.S. Women's Indoor Championships	· 1986 →

The 1985 US Indoors was a women's tennis tournament played on indoor carpet courts in Princeton, New Jersey in the United States that was part of the 1984 Virginia Slims World Championship Series (Note: The 1984 Virginia Slims World Championship Series ran from March 1984 through March 1985.). It was the 76th edition of the tournament and was held from March 4 through March 10, 1985. Fourth-seeded Hana Mandlíková won the singles title.

== Finals ==
=== Singles ===
(Czechoslovakia) Hana Mandlíková defeated (Sweden) Catarina Lindqvist 6–3, 7–5

- It was Mandlíková's 2nd singles title of the year and the 23rd of her career.

=== Doubles ===
(United States) Martina Navratilova / (United States) Pam Shriver defeated (Netherlands) Marcella Mesker / (Australia) Elizabeth Smylie 7–5, 6–2

- It was Navratilova's 3rd doubles title of the year and the 107th of her career. It was Shriver's 1st doubles title of the year and the 57th of her career.
