= 1984 Edgbaston Cup – Singles =

Singles
- 1984 Edgbaston Cup
- 1983 Champion: (United States) Billie Jean King

Final
- Champion: (United States) Pam Shriver
- Runner-up: (United States) Anne White
- Score: 7–6^{(7–2)}, 6–3

Details
- Draw: 56 (8Q/2LL)
- Seeds: 14

Events
Singles	Doubles
- Birmingham Classic

Billie Jean King was the defending champion but did not compete at this event in 1984.

Pam Shriver won in the final 7–6^{(7–2)}, 6–3 against Anne White.

== Seeds ==
The top eight seeds receive a bye into the second round.

1. (United States) Pam Shriver (Champion)
2. (United States) Zina Garrison (second round)
3. (United States) Kathy Rinaldi (third round)
4. (United States) Pam Casale (second round)
5. (United States) Alycia Moulton (third round)
6. (United States) Kim Shaefer (third round)
7. (South Africa) Rosalyn Fairbank (third round)
8. (United States) JoAnne Russell (second round)
9. (United States) Sharon Walsh (third round)
10. (West Germany) Bettina Bunge (semifinals)
11. (United States) Anne White (final)
12. N/A
13. (United States) Mary Lou Piatek (second round)
14. (United States) Wendy White (quarterfinals)

== Draw ==
Key

- Q = Qualifier
- WC = Wild card
- LL = Lucky loser
- Alt = Alternate
- ITF = ITF entry
- PR = Protected ranking
- SR = Special ranking
- SE = Special exempt
- JE = Junior exempt
- JR = Junior Accelerator Programme entrant
- CO = College Accelerator Programme entrant
- NG = Next Gen Accelerator Program entrant
- w/o = Walkover
- r = Retired
- d = Defaulted

=== Finals ===
Quarterfinals
1	(United States) Pam Shriver	6	3	6
(United States) Terry Holladay	1	6	1
10	(West Germany) Bettina Bunge	6	7
14	(United States) Wendy White	3	5
11	(United States) Anne White	6	6
(Australia) Elizabeth Sayers	3	4
(United States) Camille Benjamin	3	6	1
(United Kingdom) Anne Hobbs	6	3	6

Semifinals
1	(United States) Pam Shriver	7	7
10	(West Germany) Bettina Bunge	5	5
11	(United States) Anne White	6	6
(United Kingdom) Anne Hobbs	2	4

Final
1	(United States) Pam Shriver	7^{7}	6
11	(United States) Anne White	6^{2}	3

=== Top half ===
==== Section 1 ====
First round
(United Kingdom) A Croft	6	2	1
(Australia) A Minter	3	6	6
(United States) P Smith	6	4	2
(United Kingdom) R Einy	3	6	6
(Switzerland) L Drescher	7	6
(United Kingdom) S Barker	5	3
LL	(United States) M Van Nostrand	3	0
Q	(Brazil) C Monteiro	6	6
(United States) S Collins	2	6
(United States) T Holladay	6	7
(United States) E Burgin	3	4
(United States) A Henricksson	6	6

Second round
1	(United States) P Shriver	6	6
(Australia) A Minter	2	3
(United Kingdom) R Einy	0	3
(Switzerland) L Drescher	6	6
Q	(Brazil) C Monteiro	4	4
(United States) T Holladay	6	6
(United States) A Henricksson	3	4
5	(United States) A Moulton	6	6

Third round
1	(United States) P Shriver	6	6
(Switzerland) L Drescher	3	0
(United States) T Holladay	6	3	6
5	(United States) A Moulton	3	6	1

Quarterfinals
1	(United States) P Shriver	6	3	6
(United States) T Holladay	1	6	1

==== Section 2 ====
First round
LL	(Australia) S Leo	6	6
(United States) M Torres	2	2
(France) C Vanier	2	2
(United States) L McNeil	6	6
Q	(Australia) B Remilton	1	1
10	(West Germany) B Bunge	6	6
14	(United States) W White	6	6
(United States) L Allen	2	2
(United Kingdom) A Brown	6	6
(United States) K Latham	3	3
(Japan) E Inoue	6	6
(United States) G Purdy	3	0

Second round
3	(United States) K Rinaldi	6	7	6
LL	(Australia) S Leo	7	6	4
(United States) L McNeil	3	4
10	(West Germany) B Bunge	6	6
14	(United States) W White	6	5	6
(United Kingdom) A Brown	4	7	3
(Japan) E Inoue	6	4
7	(South Africa) R Fairbank	7	6

Third round
3	(United States) K Rinaldi	1	1
10	(West Germany) B Bunge	6	6
14	(United States) W White	6	6
7	(South Africa) R Fairbank	4	4

Quarterfinals
10	(West Germany) B Bunge	6	7
14	(United States) W White	3	5

=== Bottom half ===
==== Section 3 ====
First round
(France) S Amiach	3	6	2
Q	(United States) H Ludloff	6	2	6
Q	(United States) L Antonoplis	6	3	7
Q	(United States) T Mochizuki	3	6	2
(United Kingdom) S Walpole	1	0
11	(United States) A White	6	6
9	(United States) S Walsh	7	4	6
(South Africa) R Uys	6	6	3
(United Kingdom) S Gomer	7	3	3
(United States) T Phelps	5	6	6
Q	(South Africa) B Mould	4	4
(Australia) E Sayers	6	6

Second round
8	(United States) J Russell	4	1
Q	(United States) H Ludloff	6	6
Q	(United States) L Antonoplis	4	4
11	(United States) A White	6	6
9	(United States) S Walsh	6	2	6
(United States) T Phelps	3	6	4
(Australia) E Sayers	7	7
4	(United States) P Casale	5	5

Third round
Q	(United States) H Ludloff	5	3
11	(United States) A White	7	6
9	(United States) S Walsh	1	3
(Australia) E Sayers	6	6

Quarterfinals
11	(United States) A White	6	6
(Australia) E Sayers	3	4

==== Section 4 ====
First round
(United States) K Sands	6	3	8
(United States) G Rush	0	6	10
(United States) C Benjamin	6	6	6
Q	(United Kingdom) J Salmon	0	7	3
Q	(United States) K Cummings	3	2
13	(United States) M L Piatek	6	6
(United States) P Teeguarden	4	4
(United Kingdom) A Hobbs	6	6
(United States) B Nagelsen	3	6	3
(South Africa) J Mundel	6	0	6
(South Africa) Y Vermaak	6	6
(Romania) L Romanov	0	1

Second round
6	(United States) K Shaefer	0	3	ret.
(United States) G Rush	6	1
(United States) C Benjamin	6	6	6
13	(United States) M L Piatek	3	7	4
(United Kingdom) A Hobbs	6	6
(South Africa) J Mundel	3	3
(South Africa) Y Vermaak	6	2	6
2	(United States) Z Garrison	0	6	2

Third round
(United States) G Rush	6	3	3
(United States) C Benjamin	4	6	6
(United Kingdom) A Hobbs	7	6
(South Africa) Y Vermaak	5	2

Quarterfinals
(United States) C Benjamin	3	6	1
(United Kingdom) A Hobbs	6	3	6
