= 1984 Edgbaston Cup =

- Date: 11–17 June
- Edition: 3rd
- Draw: 56S / 32D
- Prize money: $125,000
- Surface: Grass / outdoor
- Location: Birmingham, United Kingdom
- Venue: Edgbaston Priory Club

Champions

Singles
- (United States) Pam Shriver

Doubles
- (United States) Leslie Allen / (United States) Anne White
- Birmingham Classic

The '1984 Edgbaston Cup] was a women's tennis tournament played on outdoor grass courts that was part of the 1984 Virginia Slims World Championship Series. It was the third edition of the tournament and took place at the Edgbaston Priory Club in Birmingham, United Kingdom between 11 June and 17 June 1984.

== Finals ==
=== Singles ===
(United States) Pam Shriver defeated (United States) Anne White 7–6^{(7–2)}, 6–3

- It was Shriver's second singles title of the year and the 7th of her career.

=== Doubles ===
(United States) Leslie Allen / (United States) Anne White defeated (United States) Barbara Jordan / (Australia) Elizabeth Sayers 7–5, 6–3

- It was Allen's 2nd title of the year and the 6th of her career. It was White's 4th title of the year and of her career.

== Entrants ==
=== Seeds ===
Athlete	Nationality	Seeding
Pam Shriver	United States	1
Zina Garrison	United States	2
Kathy Rinaldi	United States	3
Pam Casale	United States	4
Alycia Moulton	United States	5
Kim Shaefer	United States	6
Rosalyn Fairbank	South Africa	7
JoAnne Russell	United States	8
Sharon Walsh	United States	9
Bettina Bunge	West Germany	10
Anne White	United States	11
N/A	N/A	12
Mary-Lou Piatek	United States	13
Wendy White	United States	14

=== Other entrants ===
The following players received entry from the qualifying draw:

- (United States) Lea Antonoplis
- (United States) Kathleen Cummings
- (United States) Heather Ludloff
- (United States) Tina Mochizuki
- (Brazil) Cláudia Monteiro
- (South Africa) Beverly Mould
- (Australia) Brenda Remilton
- (United Kingdom) Julie Salmon

The following players received a lucky loser spot:

- (Australia) Susan Leo
- (United States) Molly Van Nostrand
