= 1984 Miami Classic – Singles =

Singles
- 1984 Miami Classic

Final
- Champion: (Peru) Laura Gildemeister
- Runner-up: (Austria) Petra Huber
- Score: 6–3, 6–2

Details
- Draw: 32 (4Q/2LL)
- Seeds: 8

Events
Singles	Doubles
Miami Classic

Laura Gildemeister won the title by defeating Petra Huber 6–3, 6–2 in the final.

== Seeds ==
1. (Peru) Laura Gildemeister (champion)
2. (United States) Michelle Torres (first round)
3. (South Africa) Yvonne Vermaak (second round)
4. (South Africa) Jennifer Mundel (first round)
5. (United States) Betsy Nagelsen (first round)
6. (France) Marie-Christine Calleja (first round)
7. (United Kingdom) Amanda Brown (second round)
8. (Italy) Sandra Cecchini (first round)

== Draw ==
=== Key ===
- Q = Qualifier
- WC = Wild card
- LL = Lucky loser
- Alt = Alternate
- ITF = ITF entry
- PR = Protected ranking
- SR = Special ranking
- SE = Special exempt
- JE = Junior exempt
- JR = Junior Accelerator Programme entrant
- CO = College Accelerator Programme entrant
- NG = Next Gen Accelerator Program entrant
- w/o = Walkover
- r = Retired
- d = Defaulted

=== Finals ===
Semifinals
1	(Peru) Laura Gildemeister	4	6	7
Q	(Socialist Federal Republic of Yugoslavia) Sabrina Goleš	6	3	6
(Austria) Petra Huber	6	3	6
(Brazil) Patricia Medrado	2	6	4

Final
1	(Peru) Laura Gildemeister	6	6
(Austria) Petra Huber	3	2

=== Top half ===
First round
1	(Peru) L Gildemeister	6	6
(United States) A Henricksson	4	4
(Australia) S Leo	6	6
(United States) N Yeargin	2	2
(United States) AM Fernandez	2	2
(United States) M Schillig	6	6
(United States) P Smith	6	6	6
8	(Italy) S Cecchini	4	7	4
3	(South Africa) Y Vermaak	6	6
(West Germany) S Graf	4	4
LL	(United States) C Reynolds	0	5
Q	(Socialist Federal Republic of Yugoslavia) S Goleš	6	7
LL	(Czechoslovakia) Y Brzáková	3	2
(United States) B Bramblett	6	6
(Argentina) A Villagrán-Reami	5	6	6
5	(United States) B Nagelsen	7	4	3

Second round
1	(Peru) L Gildemeister	6	1	6
(Australia) S Leo	4	6	1
(United States) M Schillig	2	0
(United States) P Smith	6	6
3	(South Africa) Y Vermaak	4	2
Q	(Socialist Federal Republic of Yugoslavia) S Goleš	6	6
(United States) B Bramblett	6	6
(Argentina) A Villagrán-Reami	3	4

Quarterfinals
1	(Peru) L Gildemeister	6	6
(United States) P Smith	2	3
Q	(Socialist Federal Republic of Yugoslavia) S Goleš	6	4	6
(United States) B Bramblett	0	6	4

Semifinals
1	(Peru) L Gildemeister	4	6	7
Q	(Socialist Federal Republic of Yugoslavia) S Goleš	6	3	6

=== Bottom half ===
First round
6	(France) MC Calleja	6	1	4
(Romania) L Romanov	1	6	6
Q	(Argentina) E Raponi Longo	2	2
(Austria) P Huber	6	6
(United States) K Keil	6	1
(United States) B Gerken	7	6
(United States) A Holton	6	6
4	(South Africa) J Mundel	2	3
7	(United Kingdom) A Brown	6	7
(United States) T Mochizuki	1	6
(United States) V Nelson-Dunbar	6	6
(United States) K Latham	1	4
Q	(United Kingdom) A Croft	3	2
(Brazil) P Medrado	6	6
Q	(United States) M Brown	6	6
2	(United States) M Torres	3	4

Second round
(Romania) L Romanov	1	6	1
(Austria) P Huber	6	3	6
(United States) B Gerken	6	6
(United States) A Holton	2	3
7	(United Kingdom) A Brown	1	3
(United States) V Nelson-Dunbar	6	6
(Brazil) P Medrado	6	6
Q	(United States) M Brown	1	1

Quarterfinals
(Austria) P Huber	7	6
(United States) B Gerken	6	0
(United States) V Nelson-Dunbar	3	5
(Brazil) P Medrado	6	7

Semifinals
(Austria) P Huber	6	3	6
(Brazil) P Medrado	2	6	4
