= 1984 Virginia Slims of New Orleans – Doubles =

Doubles
- 1984 Virginia Slims of New Orleans

Final
- Champions: (United States) Martina Navratilova (United States) Pam Shriver
- Runners-up: (Australia) Wendy Turnbull (United States) Sharon Walsh
- Score: 6–4, 6–1

Details
- Draw: 13
- Seeds: 4

Events
Singles	Doubles
- Virginia Slims of New Orleans

In the inaugural edition of the tournament, Martina Navratilova and Pam Shriver won the title by defeating Wendy Turnbull and Sharon Walsh 6–4, 6–1 in the final.

== Seeds ==
The first three seeds received a bye to the quarterfinals.

1. (United States) Martina Navratilova / (United States) Pam Shriver (champions)
2. (Australia) Wendy Turnbull / (United States) Sharon Walsh (final)
3. (South Africa) Rosalyn Fairbank / (Australia) Elizabeth Sayers (semifinals)
4. (United States) Sandy Collins / (United States) Mary Lou Piatek (first round)

== Draw ==
Key

- Q = Qualifier
- WC = Wild card
- LL = Lucky loser
- Alt = Alternate
- ITF = ITF entry
- PR = Protected ranking
- SR = Special ranking
- SE = Special exempt
- JE = Junior exempt
- JR = Junior Accelerator Programme entrant
- CO = College Accelerator Programme entrant
- NG = Next Gen Accelerator Program entrant
- w/o = Walkover
- r = Retired
- d = Defaulted

=== Draw ===
First round
(United States) T Holladay (Poland) I Kuczyńska	6	6
(United States) M Torres (South Africa) R Uys	0	1
(United States) K Shaefer (United States) W White	0	3
(United States) A Moulton (South Africa) Y Vermaak	6	6
(United States) J Klitch (Australia) A Minter	0	1
(United States) Z Garrison (United States) L McNeil	6	6
(Peru) L Arraya (West Germany) B Bunge	7	6
4	(United States) S Collins (United States) ML Piatek	6	0
(United States) P Casale (United States) B Herr	6	6
(United States) G Fernández (Australia) S Leo	4	4

Quarterfinals
1	(United States) M Navratilova (United States) P Shriver	6	6
(United States) T Holladay (Poland) I Kuczyńska	2	0
3	(South Africa) R Fairbank (Australia) E Sayers	6	6
(United States) A Moulton (South Africa) Y Vermaak	4	4
(United States) Z Garrison (United States) L McNeil	6	2	6
(Peru) L Arraya (West Germany) B Bunge	4	6	3
(United States) P Casale (United States) B Herr	2	1
2	(Australia) W Turnbull (United States) S Walsh	6	6

Semifinals
1	(United States) M Navratilova (United States) P Shriver	6	6
3	(South Africa) R Fairbank (Australia) E Sayers	2	1
(United States) Z Garrison (United States) L McNeil	2	0
2	(Australia) W Turnbull (United States) S Walsh	6	6

Final
1	(United States) M Navratilova (United States) P Shriver	6	6
2	(Australia) W Turnbull (United States) S Walsh	4	1
