= 1987 US Indoors =

Tennis tournament

- Date: March 30 – April 4
- Edition: 78th
- Category: Category 3
- Draw: 32S / 14D
- Prize money: $150,000
- Surface: Carpet / indoor
- Location: Princeton, New Jersey, U.S.

Champions

Singles
- (Czechoslovakia) Helena Suková

Doubles
- (United States) Gigi Fernández / (United States) Lori McNeil
← 1986 ·	U.S. Women's Indoor Championships	· 2001 →

The 1987 US Indoors was a women's tennis tournament played on indoor carpet courts in Princeton, New Jersey in the United States that was part of the Category 3 tier of the 1987 Virginia Slims World Championship Series. It was the 78th edition of the tournament and was held from March 30 through April 4, 1987. Second-seeded Helena Suková won the singles title.

== Finals ==
=== Singles ===
(Czechoslovakia) Helena Suková defeated (United States) Lori McNeil 6–0, 6–3

- It was Suková's 1st singles title of the year and the 5th of her career.

=== Doubles ===
(United States) Gigi Fernández / (United States) Lori McNeil defeated (United States) Betsy Nagelsen / (Australia) Elizabeth Smylie 6–1, 6–4

- It was Fernández's 1st doubles title of the year and the 5th of her career. It was McNeil's 1st doubles title of the year and the 6th of her career.
