= 1984 Miami Classic =

Tennis tournament

- Date: April 2–8
- Edition: Only
- Prize money: $50,000
- Surface: Clay / outdoor
- Location: Miami, Florida, U.S.
- Venue: Flamingo Park

Champions

Singles
- (Peru) Laura Gildemeister

Doubles
- (Brazil) Patricia Medrado / (South Africa) Yvonne Vermaak
Miami Classic

The 1984 Miami Classic was a women's tennis tournament played on outdoor clay courts in Miami, Florida in the United States that was part of the 1984 Virginia Slims World Championship Series. The tournament was held from April 2 through April 8, 1984. First-seeded Laura Arraya won the singles title.

== Finals ==
=== Singles ===
(Peru) Laura Gildemeister defeated (Austria) Petra Huber 6–3, 6–2.

- It was Arraya's only singles title of the year and the second of her career.

=== Doubles ===
(Brazil) Patricia Medrado / (South Africa) Yvonne Vermaak defeated (United States) Kate Latham / (United States) Janet Wright 6–3, 6–3.

- It was Medrado's first title of the year and the third of her career. It was Vermaak's second title of the year and the sixth of her career.
