= 1984 Virginia Slims of New Orleans =

- Date: September 24–30
- Edition: 1st
- Draw: 32S / 13D
- Prize money: $150,000
- Surface: Carpet / indoor
- Location: New Orleans, Louisiana, U.S.
- Venue: UNO Lakefront Arena

Champions

Singles
- (United States) Martina Navratilova

Doubles
- (United States) Martina Navratilova / (United States) Pam Shriver
- Virginia Slims of New Orleans

The 1984 Virginia Slims of New Orleans was a women's tennis tournament played on indoor carpet courts at the UNO Lakefront Arena in New Orleans, Louisiana in the United States that was part of the 1984 Virginia Slims World Championship Series. It was the inaugural edition of the tournament and was held from September 24 through September 30, 1984. First-seeded Martina Navratilova won the singles title.

== Finals ==
=== Singles ===
(United States) Martina Navratilova defeated (United States) Zina Garrison 6–4, 6–3

- It was Navratilova's 12th singles title of the year and the 98th of her career.

=== Doubles ===
(United States) Martina Navratilova / (United States) Pam Shriver defeated (Australia) Wendy Turnbull / (United States) Sharon Walsh 6–4, 6–1

- It was Navratilova's 21st title of the year and the 200th of her career. It was Shriver's 12th title of the year and the 61st of her career.
