= 1984 Virginia Slims of Newport =

- Date: July 30 – August 5
- Edition: 6th
- Draw: 32S / 16D
- Prize money: $150,000
- Surface: Grass / outdoor
- Location: Newport, Rhode Island, U.S.
- Venue: International Tennis Hall of Fame

Champions

Singles
- (United States) Martina Navratilova

Doubles
- (United States) Alycia Moulton / (United States) Paula Smith
- Virginia Slims of Newport

The 1984 Virginia Slims of Newport was a women's tennis tournament played on outdoor grass courts at the International Tennis Hall of Fame in Newport, Rhode Island in the United States that was part of the 1984 Virginia Slims World Championship Series. The tournament was held from July 30 through August 5, 1984. First-seeded Martina Navratilova won the singles title.

== Finals ==
=== Singles ===
(United States) Martina Navratilova defeated (United States) Gigi Fernández 6–3, 7–6^{(7–3)}

- It was Navratilova's 8th singles title of the year and the 94th of her career.

=== Doubles ===
(United States) Alycia Moulton / (United States) Paula Smith defeated (United States) Lea Antonoplis / (South Africa) Beverly Mould 7–5, 7–6^{(7–2)}

- It was Moulton's 1st title of the year and the 3rd of her career. It was Smith's 1st title of the year and the 9th of her career.
