= 1984 Eastbourne International =

- Date: June 18–24
- Edition: 10th
- Draw: 64S / 32D
- Prize money: $175,000
- Surface: Grass
- Location: Eastbourne, United Kingdom
- Venue: Devonshire Park

Champions

Singles
- (United States) Martina Navratilova

Doubles
- (United States) Martina Navratilova / (United States) Pam Shriver
- Eastbourne International

The 1984 Eastbourne International was a women's tennis tournament played on outdoor grass courts at Devonshire Park in Eastbourne, United Kingdom that was part of the 1984 Virginia Slims World Championship Series. The tournament was held from 18 June until 24 June 1984. First-seeded Martina Navratilova won the singles title.

== Finals ==
=== Singles ===
(United States) Martina Navratilova defeated (United States) Kathy Jordan 6–4, 6–1

- It was Navratilova's 6th singles title of the year and the 92nd of her career.

=== Doubles ===
(United States) Martina Navratilova / (United States) Pam Shriver defeated (United Kingdom) Jo Durie / (United States) Ann Kiyomura 6–4, 6–2

- It was Navratilova's 10th title of the year and the 191st of her career. It was Shriver's 8th title of the year and the 57th of her career.
