= 1986 US Indoors =

Tennis tournament

- Date: March 3–9
- Edition: 77th
- Draw: 32S / 16D
- Prize money: $150,000
- Surface: Carpet / indoor
- Location: Princeton, New Jersey, U.S.

Champions

Singles
- (United States) Martina Navratilova

Doubles
- (United States) Kathy Jordan / (Australia) Elizabeth Smylie
← 1985 ·	U.S. Women's Indoor Championships	· 1987 →

The 1986 US Indoors was a women's tennis tournament played on indoor carpet courts in Princeton, New Jersey in the United States that was part of the 1985 Virginia Slims World Championship Series (Note: The 1985 Virginia Slims World Championship Series ran from March 1985 through March 1986.). It was the 77th edition of the tournament and was held from March 3 through March 9, 1986. First-seeded Martina Navratilova won the singles title.

== Finals ==
=== Singles ===
(United States) Martina Navratilova defeated (Czechoslovakia) Helena Suková 3–6, 6–0, 7–6^{(7–5)}

- It was Navratilova's 3rd singles title of the year and the 114th of her career.

=== Doubles ===
(United States) Kathy Jordan / (Australia) Elizabeth Smylie defeated (Czechoslovakia) Hana Mandlíková / (Czechoslovakia) Helena Suková 7–5, 6–2

- It was Jordan's 3rd doubles title of the year and the 32nd of her career. It was Smylie's 2nd doubles title of the year and the 15th of her career.
