= 1984 Virginia Slims of New Orleans – Singles =

Singles
- 1984 Virginia Slims of New Orleans

Final
- Champion: (United States) Martina Navratilova
- Runner-up: (United States) Zina Garrison
- Score: 6–4, 6–3

Details
- Draw: 32
- Seeds: 8

Events
Singles	Doubles
- Virginia Slims of New Orleans

In the inaugural edition of the tournament, Martina Navratilova won the title by defeating Zina Garrison 6–4, 6–3 in the final.

== Seeds ==
1. (United States) Martina Navratilova (champion)
2. (United States) Pam Shriver (semifinals)
3. (Australia) Wendy Turnbull (quarterfinals)
4. (United States) Zina Garrison (final)
5. (United States) Bonnie Gadusek (second round)
6. (United States) Pam Casale (quarterfinals)
7. (Peru) Laura Arraya (first round)
8. (United States) Kathy Rinaldi (second round)

== Draw ==
Key

- Q = Qualifier
- WC = Wild card
- LL = Lucky loser
- Alt = Alternate
- ITF = ITF entry
- PR = Protected ranking
- SR = Special ranking
- SE = Special exempt
- JE = Junior exempt
- JR = Junior Accelerator Programme entrant
- CO = College Accelerator Programme entrant
- NG = Next Gen Accelerator Program entrant
- w/o = Walkover
- r = Retired
- d = Defaulted

=== Finals ===
Semifinals
1	(United States) Martina Navratilova	6	7
(United States) Alycia Moulton	2	6
4	(United States) Zina Garrison	6	2	6
2	(United States) Pam Shriver	4	6	3

Final
1	(United States) Martina Navratilova	6	6
4	(United States) Zina Garrison	4	3

=== Top half ===
First round
1	(United States) M Navratilova	6	6
(United States) L Spain	3	0
(United States) B Herr	4	5
(United States) ML Piatek	6	7
(United States) J Klitch	7	4	6
(United States) S Walsh	6	6	4
(United States) M Torres	2	0
8	(United States) K Rinaldi	6	6
3	(Australia) W Turnbull	6	6
(Australia) S Leo	3	2
(South Africa) R Fairbank	3	2
(South Africa) Y Vermaak	6	6
(United States) A Moulton	3	7	6
(West Germany) B Bunge	6	5	3
(United States) M Brown	4	5
5	(United States) B Gadusek	6	7

Second round
1	(United States) M Navratilova	6	6
(United States) ML Piatek	2	0
(United States) J Klitch	0	6	6
8	(United States) K Rinaldi	6	2	3
3	(Australia) W Turnbull	7	6
(South Africa) Y Vermaak	6	4
(United States) A Moulton	6	6
5	(United States) B Gadusek	1	3

Quarterfinals
1	(United States) M Navratilova	6	6
(United States) J Klitch	1	0
3	(Australia) W Turnbull	6	6	0
(United States) A Moulton	3	7	6

Semifinals
1	(United States) M Navratilova	6	7
(United States) A Moulton	2	6

=== Bottom half ===
First round
7	(Peru) L Arraya	7	6	4
(United States) K Shaefer	6	7	6
(United States) D Spence	6	5	2
(United States) T Holladay	2	7	6
(Australia) A Minter	5	6	6
(South Africa) R Uys	7	1	1
(Australia) E Sayers	3	0
4	(United States) Z Garrison	6	6
6	(United States) P Casale	6	6
(United States) S Collins	4	4
(United States) G Fernández	5
(United States) H Ludloff	6^{r}
(United States) R White	6	5	1
(United States) T Phelps	3	7	6
(Argentina) E Longo	0	1
2	(United States) P Shriver	6	6

Second round
(United States) K Shaefer	6	4	4
(United States) T Holladay	2	6	6
(Australia) A Minter	4	0
4	(United States) Z Garrison	6	6
6	(United States) P Casale	7	7
(United States) G Fernández	6	5
(United States) T Phelps	0	2
2	(United States) P Shriver	6	6

Quarterfinals
(United States) T Holladay	3	6	3
4	(United States) Z Garrison	6	4	6
6	(United States) P Casale	2	4
2	(United States) P Shriver	6	6

Semifinals
4	(United States) Z Garrison	6	2	6
2	(United States) P Shriver	4	6	3
