= 1984 Virginia Slims of Newport – Doubles =

Doubles
- 1984 Virginia Slims of Newport

Final
- Champions: (United States) Alycia Moulton (United States) Paula Smith
- Runners-up: (United States) Lea Antonoplis (South Africa) Beverly Mould
- Score: 7–5, 7–6^{(7–2)}

Details
- Draw: 16
- Seeds: 4

Events
Singles	Doubles
- Virginia Slims of Newport

Barbara Potter and Pam Shriver were the defending champions, but none competed this year.

Alycia Moulton and Paula Smith won the title by defeating Lea Antonoplis and Beverly Mould 7–5, 7–6^{(7–2)} in the final.

== Seeds ==
1. (United States) Heather Ludloff / (Netherlands) Marcella Mesker (first round)
2. (South Africa) Rosalyn Fairbank / (United States) Candy Reynolds (semifinals)
3. (United States) Betsy Nagelsen / (United States) Wendy White (quarterfinals)
4. (United States) Alycia Moulton / (United States) Paula Smith (champions)

== Draw ==
Key

- Q = Qualifier
- WC = Wild card
- LL = Lucky loser
- Alt = Alternate
- ITF = ITF entry
- PR = Protected ranking
- SR = Special ranking
- SE = Special exempt
- JE = Junior exempt
- JR = Junior Accelerator Programme entrant
- CO = College Accelerator Programme entrant
- NG = Next Gen Accelerator Program entrant
- w/o = Walkover
- r = Retired
- d = Defaulted

=== Draw ===
First round
1	(United States) H Ludloff (Netherlands) M Mesker	2	7	3
(United States) Le Allen (United States) T Holladay	6	6	6
(United States) S Acker (United States) L Forood	6	4
(United States) A Henricksson (United States) N Yeargin	7	6
3	(United States) B Nagelsen (United States) W White	7	7
(Australia) N Gregory (United States) K Steinmetz	6	6
(United States) K Shaefer (United States) P Teeguarden	4	6
(United States) L Antonoplis (South Africa) B Mould	6	7
(United States) R Blount (United States) J Newberry	3	4
(United States) AM Fernandez (United States) P Louie	6	6
(United States) L McNeil (United States) K Sands	3	6	6
4	(United States) A Moulton (United States) P Smith	6	3	7
(South Africa) J Mundel (United States) B Norton	4	0
(Australia) B Remilton (Australia) P Whytcross	6	6
(Australia) S Leo (Australia) A Minter	4	3
2	(South Africa) R Fairbank (United States) C Reynolds	6	6

Quarterfinals
(United States) Le Allen (United States) T Holladay	6	6
(United States) A Henricksson (United States) N Yeargin	1	4
3	(United States) B Nagelsen (United States) W White	3	4
(United States) L Antonoplis (South Africa) B Mould	6	6
(United States) AM Fernandez (United States) P Louie	6	4	4
4	(United States) A Moulton (United States) P Smith	4	6	6
(Australia) B Remilton (Australia) P Whytcross	3	6	2
2	(South Africa) R Fairbank (United States) C Reynolds	6	3	6

Semifinals
(United States) Le Allen (United States) T Holladay	7	3	4
(United States) L Antonoplis (South Africa) B Mould	6	6	6
4	(United States) A Moulton (United States) P Smith	6	6
2	(South Africa) R Fairbank (United States) C Reynolds	4	2

Final
(United States) L Antonoplis (South Africa) B Mould	5	6^{2}
4	(United States) A Moulton (United States) P Smith	7	7^{7}
