= Petra Huber =

Austrian tennis player

- Full name: Petra Huber
- Country (sports): Austria
- Born: 15 February 1966 (age 60)
- Prize money: $161,735

Singles
- Career record: 62–69
- Career titles: 1
- Highest ranking: No. 37 (1 October 1984)

Grand Slam singles results
- French Open: 3R (1987)
- Wimbledon: 1R (1984, 1986)
- US Open: 4R (1984)

Other tournaments
- Olympic Games: 1R (1984)

Doubles
- Career record: 19–33
- Career titles: 2
- Highest ranking: No. 64 (15 March 1987)

Grand Slam doubles results
- French Open: 3R (1984)
- Wimbledon: 1R (1984)
- US Open: 1R (1984, 1985, 1986)

Petra Huber (born 15 February 1966) is a former professional tennis player from Austria.

== Biography ==
=== Junior career ===
Before turning professional, Huber competed successfully on the junior circuit. In 1982, she partnered with Judith Polz to make the girls' doubles semi-finals at the Australian Open and quarter-finals at the French Open. She was a semi-finalist in the girls' singles event at the 1983 French Open.

=== Professional tennis ===
Huber made her first WTA Tour final at the 1984 Miami Classic, which she lost to Laura Arraya. She reached the round of 16 at the 1984 US Open to obtain her highest career ranking of 37 in the world.

In 1986, she won the Spanish Open as an unseeded player. She had a semi-final win over a young Arantxa Sánchez Vicario, who was appearing in her first WTA main draw, then beat Italian Laura Garrone in the final. In doubles she was a finalist at three WTA events in 1986, for one win, partnering Petra Keppeler in Bregenz.

=== Representative ===
At the 1984 Summer Olympics, Huber was Austria's representative in the women's singles demonstration event.

She featured in a total of 12 Fed Cup ties for Austria. This includes Austria's 1986 Fed Cup campaign, in which they made the final eight of the World Group. In the quarter-final, she lost a close three-set match to Argentina's top player Gabriela Sabatini.

== WTA Tour finals ==
=== Singles (1-1) ===
Result	W/L	Date	Tournament	Tier	Surface	Opponent	Score
Loss	0–1	Apr 1984	Miami, United States	$50,000	Clay	(Peru) Laura Gildemeister	3–6, 2–6
Win	1–1	May 1986	Barcelona, Spain	$50,000	Clay	(Italy) Laura Garrone	7–6, 6–0

=== Doubles (2-2) ===
Result	W/L	Date	Tournament	Tier	Surface	Partner	Opponents	Score
Win	1–0	Apr 1984	Taranto, Italy	$50,000	Clay	(Socialist Federal Republic of Yugoslavia) Sabrina Goleš	(Soviet Union) Elena Eliseenko; (Soviet Union) Natasha Reva	6–3, 6–3
Loss	1–1	May 1986	Barcelona, Spain	$50,000	Clay	(West Germany) Petra Keppeler	(Czechoslovakia) Iva Budařová; (France) Catherine Tanvier	2–6, 1–6
Win	2–1	Jul 1986	Bregenz, Austria	$50,000	Clay	(West Germany) Petra Keppeler	(Socialist Federal Republic of Yugoslavia) Sabrina Goleš; (Denmark) Tine Scheuer-Larsen	6–2, 6–4
Loss	2–2	Dec 1986	São Paulo, Brazil	$50,000	Clay	(Peru) Laura Gildemeister	(Brazil) Neige Dias; (Brazil) Patricia Medrado	6–4, 4–6, 6–7^{(6–8)}
