= 1983 Lion's Cup =

- Date: November 21–27
- Edition: 6th
- Draw: 4S
- Prize money: $200,000
- Surface: Carpet / indoor
- Location: Tokyo, Japan

Champions

Singles
- (United States) Martina Navratilova
- Lion's Cup

The 1983 Lion's Cup was a women's tennis tournament played on indoor carpet courts in Tokyo, Japan that was part of the 1983 Virginia Slims World Championship Series. The tournament was held from November 21 through November 27, 1983.

== Final ==
=== Singles ===
(United States) Martina Navratilova defeated (United States) Chris Evert Lloyd 6–2, 6–2.

- It was Navratilova's 27th title of the year and the 177th of her career.

== See also ==
- Evert–Navratilova rivalry
