= Kyle Copeland =

American tennis player (born 1961)

- Full name: Kyle Copeland-Muse
- Country (sports): United States
- Born: May 19, 1961 (age 64)
- Prize money: $25,223

Singles
- Career record: -
- Career titles: 0

Grand Slam singles results
- Australian Open: Q1 (1988)
- US Open: Q2 (1981)

Doubles
- Career record: -
- Career titles: 1 WTA

Grand Slam doubles results
- French Open: 1R (1984)
- Wimbledon: 1R (1984, 1985)
- US Open: 1R (1985)

Kyle Copeland-Muse (born May 19, 1961) is an American tennis player.

== Biography ==
Copeland, a native of Montclair, New Jersey, graduated from Montclair High School. She is credited as the first black tennis player to appear for Louisiana State University in the SEC. She completed her collegiate career at Pepperdine University, graduating in 1982.

In 1983, she won her biggest professional title when she partnered with Lori McNeil to win the $50,000 Bakersfield Open, an event that was part of the WTA's Virginia Slims series.

Copeland featured in the doubles main draw of the French Open, Wimbledon and US Open during her career.

Many sources mistakenly display her given name as Kylie.

== WTA Tour finals ==
=== Doubles: 2 (1-1) ===
Result	W-L	Date	Tournament	Surface	Partner	Opponents	Score
Win	1–0	Sep 1983	Bakersfield, United States	Hard	(United States) Lori McNeil	(United States) Ann Henricksson (Brazil) Patricia Medrado	6–4, 6–3
Loss	1–1	Jul 1984	Rio de Janeiro, Brazil	Hard	(United States) Penny Mager	(Canada) Jill Hetherington (Canada) Hélène Pelletier	3–6, 6–2, 6–7^{(7–9)}
