= 1984 Eastbourne International – Doubles =

Doubles
- 1984 Eastbourne International

Final
- Champions: (United States) Martina Navratilova (United States) Pam Shriver
- Runners-up: (United Kingdom) Jo Durie (United States) Ann Kiyomura
- Score: 6–4, 6–2

Details
- Draw: 32
- Seeds: 8

Events
Singles	Doubles
- Eastbourne International

Martina Navratilova and Pam Shriver won their fourth consecutive title at Eastbourne, by defeating Jo Durie and Ann Kiyomura 6–4, 6–2 in the final.

== Seeds ==
1. (United States) Martina Navratilova / (United States) Pam Shriver (champions)
2. (United Kingdom) Anne Hobbs / (Australia) Wendy Turnbull (first round)
3. (United States) Barbara Potter / (United States) Sharon Walsh (quarterfinals)
4. (United Kingdom) Jo Durie / (United States) Ann Kiyomura (final)
5. (United States) Rosie Casals / (United States) Billie Jean King (quarterfinals)
6. (United States) Andrea Leand / (United States) Mary Lou Piatek (first round)
7. (United States) Kathy Jordan / (France) Catherine Tanvier (semifinals)
8. (Switzerland) Christiane Jolissaint / (Netherlands) Marcella Mesker (quarterfinals)

== Draw ==
Key

- Q = Qualifier
- WC = Wild card
- LL = Lucky loser
- Alt = Alternate
- ITF = ITF entry
- PR = Protected ranking
- SR = Special ranking
- SE = Special exempt
- JE = Junior exempt
- JR = Junior Accelerator Programme entrant
- CO = College Accelerator Programme entrant
- NG = Next Gen Accelerator Program entrant
- w/o = Walkover
- r = Retired
- d = Defaulted

=== Finals ===
Semifinals
1	(United States) Martina Navratilova (United States) Pam Shriver	6	6
7	(United States) Kathy Jordan (France) Catherine Tanvier	3	2
4	(United Kingdom) Jo Durie (United States) Ann Kiyomura	6	6
(United States) Lea Antonoplis (South Africa) Beverly Mould	2	1

Final
1	(United States) Martina Navratilova (United States) Pam Shriver	6	6
4	(United Kingdom) Jo Durie (United States) Ann Kiyomura	4	2

=== Top half ===
First round
1	(United States) M Navratilova (United States) P Shriver	6	6
(Brazil) P Medrado (Australia) B Remilton	4	3
(West Germany) B Bunge (West Germany) E Pfaff	3	4
(South Africa) R Fairbank (United States) G Rush	6	6
(South Africa) I Kloss (Netherlands) B Stöve	3	6	0
(United States) T Holladay (United States) K Shaefer	6	0	6
(United States) B Herr (United States) P Teeguarden	5	4
5	(United States) R Casals (United States) BJ King	7	6
3	(United States) B Potter (United States) S Walsh	7	7
(United States) G Fernández (United States) A Moulton	5	5
(West Germany) C Kohde-Kilsch (Czechoslovakia) H Mandlíková	4	6	6
(Bulgaria) M Maleeva (Czechoslovakia) H Suková	6	3	2
(United States) Z Garrison (United States) L McNeil	6	6
(United States) S Acker (United States) B Nagelsen	2	2
(United States) C Benjamin (Socialist Federal Republic of Yugoslavia) S Goleš	1	5
7	(United States) K Jordan (France) C Tanvier	6	7

Second round
1	(United States) M Navratilova (United States) P Shriver	6	6
(South Africa) R Fairbank (United States) G Rush	4	2
(United States) T Holladay (United States) K Shaefer	6	3
5	(United States) R Casals (United States) BJ King	7	6
3	(United States) B Potter (United States) S Walsh	6	6
(West Germany) C Kohde-Kilsch (Czechoslovakia) H Mandlíková	3	2
(United States) Z Garrison (United States) L McNeil	4	4
7	(United States) K Jordan (France) C Tanvier	6	6

Quarterfinals
1	(United States) M Navratilova (United States) P Shriver	6	6
5	(United States) R Casals (United States) BJ King	2	2
3	(United States) B Potter (United States) S Walsh	4	4
7	(United States) K Jordan (France) C Tanvier	6	6

Semifinals
1	(United States) M Navratilova (United States) P Shriver	6	6
7	(United States) K Jordan (France) C Tanvier	3	2

=== Bottom half ===
First round
8	(Switzerland) C Jolissaint (Netherlands) M Mesker	6	6
(United Kingdom) S Gomer (United Kingdom) J Salmon	2	4
(Socialist Federal Republic of Yugoslavia) M Jaušovec (United Kingdom) V Wade	4	7	1
(United States) P Smith (United States) W White	6	6	6
(United States) S Collins (Australia) A Minter	3	3
(Canada) C Bassett (Hungary) A Temesvári	6	6
(United States) E Burgin (United States) J Russell	6	5	2
4	(United Kingdom) J Durie (United States) A Kiyomura	4	7	6
6	(United States) A Leand (United States) ML Piatek	6	2	1
(United States) L Antonoplis (South Africa) B Mould	3	6	6
(Australia) S Leo (Australia) P Whytcross	6	6
(United States) B Jordan (Australia) E Sayers	4	2
(United States) Le Allen (Australia) A White	2	1
(United States) K Sands (France) C Vanier	6	6
(Brazil) C Monteiro (South Africa) Y Vermaak	3	6	6
2	(United Kingdom) A Hobbs (Australia) W Turnbull	6	4	3

Second round
8	(Switzerland) C Jolissaint (Netherlands) M Mesker	2	6	6
(United States) P Smith (United States) W White	6	2	1
(Canada) C Bassett (Hungary) A Temesvári	1	2
4	(United Kingdom) J Durie (United States) A Kiyomura	6	6
(United States) L Antonoplis (South Africa) B Mould	7	6
(Australia) S Leo (Australia) P Whytcross	5	0
(United States) K Sands (France) C Vanier	6	1	3
(Brazil) C Monteiro (South Africa) Y Vermaak	3	6	6

Quarterfinals
8	(Switzerland) C Jolissaint (Netherlands) M Mesker	5	5
4	(United Kingdom) J Durie (United States) A Kiyomura	7	7
(United States) L Antonoplis (South Africa) B Mould	6	7
(Brazil) C Monteiro (South Africa) Y Vermaak	2	5

Semifinals
4	(United Kingdom) J Durie (United States) A Kiyomura	6	6
(United States) L Antonoplis (South Africa) B Mould	2	1
