= Lion's Cup =

Women's tennis tournament

Defunct tennis tournament
- Event name: Emeron Cup (1978–1979); Lion's Cup (1980–1985)
- Tour: WTA Tour
- Founded: 1978
- Abolished: 1985
- Editions: 8
- Location: Tokyo, Japan
- Surface: Hard / indoor Carpet / indoor

The Lion's Cup (named the Emeron Cup in its first two years) was a WTA Tour tennis tournament held from 1978 until 1985, in Tokyo, Japan. The event was held on indoor hard courts in 1978 and 1979 before moving to indoor carpet courts. Only a singles event was contested.

== Finals ==
Date	Winner	Finalist	Score
11 December 1978	(United States) Chris Evert	(Czechoslovakia) Martina Navratilova	7–5, 6–2
10 December 1979	(United States) Tracy Austin	(Czechoslovakia) Martina Navratilova	6–2, 6–1
17 November 1980	(Czechoslovakia) Martina Navratilova	(United States) Tracy Austin	6–4, 6–3
16 November 1981	(Czechoslovakia) Martina Navratilova	(United States) Chris Evert-Lloyd	6–3, 6–2
15 November 1982	(United States) Chris Evert-Lloyd	(United States) Andrea Jaeger	6–3, 6–2
21 November 1983	(Czechoslovakia) Martina Navratilova	(United States) Chris Evert-Lloyd	6–2, 6–2
12 November 1984	(Bulgaria) Manuela Maleeva	(Czechoslovakia) Hana Mandlíková	6–1, 1–6, 6–4
11 November 1985	(United States) Chris Evert-Lloyd	(Bulgaria) Manuela Maleeva	7–5, 6–0
