= Laura Arraya =

Peruvian tennis player

- Country (sports): Peru
- Residence: Lima, Peru
- Born: 12 January 1964 (age 62) Córdoba, Argentina
- Height: 1.73 m (5 ft 8 in)
- Turned pro: 1983
- Plays: Right-handed (two-handed backhand)
- Prize money: $1,005,589

Singles
- Career record: 245–207 (54.2%)
- Career titles: 4
- Highest ranking: No. 14 (12 March 1990)

Grand Slam singles results
- Australian Open: 2R (1991, 1992, 1993)
- French Open: 4R (1984, 1986, 1990)
- Wimbledon: QF (1991)
- US Open: 3R (1990)

Other tournaments
- Olympic Games: 1R (1984)

Doubles
- Career record: 148–170 (46.5%)
- Career titles: 1
- Highest ranking: No. 27 (28 March 1988)

Grand Slam doubles results
- Australian Open: 1R (1991, 1992, 1993)
- French Open: 3R (1985)
- Wimbledon: 3R (1993)
- US Open: 3R (1985, 1987, 1990, 1992)

Laura Arraya (born 12 January 1964) is a retired Peruvian tennis player. She was also known by her married name Laura Gildemeister.

== Career ==
At a young age, Argentine-born Arraya emigrated to Peru with her family and acquired Peruvian nationality. She later represented Peru in international matches. Her best result in a Grand Slam was a quarterfinal at Wimbledon in 1991. Her brother Pablo Arraya is a former tennis player, who reached the top 30 in the Association of Tennis Professionals rankings. In 1984, Arraya married Chilean tennis player Heinz Gildemeister, but they later divorced.

At present, she directs a tennis academy in Lima and in Key Biscayne with her brother Pablo.

When she won the OTB Open in July 1989, she became the first mother since Evonne Goolagong to win a Women's Tennis Association tournament.

== WTA Tour finals ==
=== Singles: 10 (4–6) ===
Winner – Legend Grand Slam tournaments (0–0) WTA Tour Championships (0–0) Tier I (0–0) Tier II (0–0) Tier III (0–1) Tier IV (1–1) Tier V (1–0) Virginia Slims, Avon, Others (2–4)	Titles by surface Hard (3–2) Grass (0–0) Clay (1–3) Carpet (0–1)

Result	W/L	Date	Tournament	Surface	Opponent	Score
Win	1–0	Oct 1982	Tokyo, Japan	Hard	(Peru) Pilar Vásquez	3–6, 6–4, 6–0
Loss	1–1	Jul 1983	Freiburg, West Germany	Clay	(France) Catherine Tanvier	4–6, 5–7
Loss	1–2	Oct 1983	Tokyo, Japan	Hard	(United States) Lisa Bonder	1–6, 3–6
Win	2–2	Apr 1984	Miami, U.S.	Clay	(Austria) Petra Huber	6–3, 6–2
Loss	2–3	Apr 1984	Orlando, U.S.	Clay	(United States) Martina Navratilova	0–6, 1–6
Loss	2–4	Mar 1985	São Paulo, Brazil	Clay	(Argentina) Mercedes Paz	7–5, 1–6, 4–6
Win	3–4	Jul 1989	Schenectady, U.S.	Hard	(United States) Marianne Werdel	6–4, 6–3
Win	4–4	Oct 1989	San Juan, U.S.	Hard	(United States) Gigi Fernández	6–1, 6–2
Loss	4–5	Aug 1990	Albuquerque, U.S.	Hard	(Czechoslovakia) Jana Novotná	4–6, 4–6
Loss	4–6	Feb 1992	Osaka, Japan	Carpet (I)	(Czechoslovakia) Helena Suková	2–6, 6–4, 1–6

=== Doubles: 10 (1–9) ===
Winner – Legend Grand Slam tournaments (0–0) WTA Tour Championships (0–0) Tier I (0–0) Tier II (0–1) Tier III (0–1) Tier IV (0–1) Tier V (0–0) Virginia Slims (1–6)	Titles by surface Hard (0–4) Grass (0–0) Clay (1–5) Carpet (0–0)

Result	W/L	Date	Tournament	Surface	Partner	Opponents	Score
Loss	0–1	Mar 1985	Palm Beach Gardens, U.S.	Clay	(Argentina) Gabriela Sabatini	(United States) JoAnne Russell (United States) Anne Smith	6–1, 1–6, 6–7^{(4–7)}
Loss	0–2	Oct 1985	Tokyo, Japan	Hard	(United States) Beth Herr	(Australia) Belinda Cordwell (Australia) Julie Richardson	4–6, 4–6
Loss	0–3	Nov 1985	Tampa, U.S.	Hard	(United States) Lisa Bonder	(Canada) Carling Bassett (Argentina) Gabriela Sabatini	0–6, 0–6
Loss	0–4	Apr 1986	Isle of Palms, U.S.	Clay	(Czechoslovakia) Marcela Skuherská	(Italy) Sandra Cecchini (Socialist Federal Republic of Yugoslavia) Sabrina Goleš	6–4, 0–6, 3–6
Loss	0–5	Dec 1986	São Paulo, Brazil	Clay	(Austria) Petra Huber	(Brazil) Niege Dias (Brazil) Pat Medrado	6–4, 4–6, 6–7^{(6–8)}
Win	1–5	Mar 1987	Isle of Palms, U.S.	Clay	(Denmark) Tine Scheuer-Larsen	(Argentina) Mercedes Paz (United States) Candy Reynolds	6–4, 6–4
Loss	1–6	May 1987	Geneva, Switzerland	Clay	(France) Catherine Tanvier	(United States) Betsy Nagelsen (Australia) Elizabeth Smylie	6–4, 4–6, 3–6
Loss	1–7	Aug 1989	Mahwah, U.S.	Hard	(United States) Louise Allen	(West Germany) Steffi Graf (United States) Pam Shriver	2–6, 4–6
Loss	1–8	Apr 1990	Tampa, U.S.	Clay	(Italy) Sandra Cecchini	(Argentina) Mercedes Paz (Spain) Arantxa Sánchez Vicario	2–6, 0–6
Loss	1–9	Sep 1991	Tokyo, Japan	Hard	(United States) Carrie Cunningham	(United States) Mary Joe Fernández (United States) Pam Shriver	3–6, 3–6

== Grand Slam singles performance timeline ==
Key
W	F	SF	QF	#R	RR	Q#	DNQ	A	NH

(W) winner; (F) finalist; (SF) semifinalist; (QF) quarterfinalist; (#R) rounds 4, 3, 2, 1; (RR) round-robin stage; (Q#) qualification round; (DNQ) did not qualify; (A) absent; (NH) not held; (SR) strike rate (events won / competed); (W–L) win–loss record.

Tournament	1981	1982	1983	1984	1985	1986	1987	1988	1989	1990	1991	1992	1993	Career SR
Australian Open	A	A	A	A	A	NH	A	A	A	A	2R	2R	2R	0 / 3
French Open	A	1R	1R	4R	2R	4R	1R	A	2R	4R	2R	1R	3R	0 / 11
Wimbledon	A	A	A	1R	A	1R	3R	A	3R	3R	QF	3R	1R	0 / 8
US Open	1R	2R	2R	1R	1R	2R	2R	A	2R	3R	2R	2R	1R	0 / 12
SR	0 / 1	0 / 2	0 / 2	0 / 3	0 / 2	0 / 3	0 / 3	0 / 0	0 / 3	0 / 3	0 / 4	0 / 4	0 / 4	0 / 34
Year End Ranking	116	69	51	34	63	33	45	NR	19	21	24	45	71	

== Other finals ==
=== Singles (3-1) ===
Result	No.	Date	Tournament	Surface	Opponent	Score
Win	1.	21 March 1982	Brasília, Brazil	Clay	(Argentina) Andrea Tiezzi	6–3, 7–6
Win	2.	4 April 1982	Porto Alegre, Brazil	Clay	(Argentina) Ivanna Madruga	6–3, 6–4
Loss	3.	4 April 1982	Curitiba, Brazil	Clay	(Brazil) Patricia Medrado	3–6, 6–4, 6–7
Win	4.	26 November 1989	Santiago, Chile	Clay	(Argentina) Gabriela Mosca	6–3, 2–6, 6–0

=== Doubles (2–2) ===
Result	No.	Date	Tournament	Surface	Partner	Opponents	Score
Win	1.	28 March 1982	Rio de Janeiro, Brazil	Clay	(Argentina) Ivanna Madruga	(Brazil) Patricia Medrado (Spain) Carmen Perea	6–0, 6–2
Loss	2.	4 April 1982	Porto Alegre, Brazil	Clay	(Argentina) Ivanna Madruga	(Brazil) Patricia Medrado (Spain) Carmen Perea	6–4, 4–6, 2–6
Win	3.	14 October 1990	Lima, Peru	Clay	(Peru) Karim Strohmeier	(Cuba) Iluminada Concepción (Cuba) Rita Pichardo	6–4, 7–6
Loss	4.	26 September 1994	Lima, Peru	Clay	(Peru) María Eugenia Rojas	(Brazil) Luciana Tella (Brazil) Vanessa Menga	4–6, 3–6

== Personal life ==
Laura is the ex-wife of German-Chilean former tennis player Heinz Gildemeister
