= Jennifer Mundel =

South African tennis player

- Full name: Jennifer Mundel-Reinbold
- Country (sports): South Africa
- Born: 20 January 1962 (age 64) Rustenburg, South Africa
- Height: 1.78 m (5 ft 10 in)
- Turned pro: 1979
- Plays: Left-handed (two-handed backhand)
- Prize money: US$ 194,242

Singles
- Career record: 53–66
- Career titles: 1
- Highest ranking: No. 55 (15 August 1983)

Grand Slam singles results
- Australian Open: 3R (1987)
- French Open: 2R (1985)
- Wimbledon: QF (1983)
- US Open: 3R (1982, 1984)

Doubles
- Career record: 37–51
- Career titles: 0

Grand Slam doubles results
- Wimbledon: QF (1986)

Jennifer Mundel (born 20 January 1962) is a former professional tennis player from South Africa.

== Career ==
Mundel turned professional in 1979. She reached a career-high singles world ranking of 55 in August 1983.

Her best Grand Slam result came at the 1983 Wimbledon Championships. Unseeded, she defeated eighth seed Hana Mandlíková 5–7, 6–4, 6–4 in the fourth round to reach the quarterfinals. There she lost to top seed and eventual champion Martina Navratilova 6–3, 6–1.

Her only professional singles title came at the 1983 Bakersfield Open which was part of the Ginny Circuit. She was a doubles finalist at the 1982 Hong Kong Open, the 1984 Central Fidelity Banks International, and the 1985 Virginia Slims of Indianapolis.

== Career finals ==
=== Singles (1 win) ===
Result	W/L	Date	Tournament	Surface	Opponent	Score
Win	1–0	Sep 1983	Bakersfield, U.S.	Hard	(United States) Julie Harrington	6–4, 6–1
