= 1983 Family Circle Cup – Singles =

Singles
- 1983 Family Circle Cup
- 1982 Champion: (United States) Martina Navratilova

Final
- Champion: (United States) Martina Navratilova
- Runner-up: (United States) Tracy Austin
- Score: 5–7, 6–1, 6–0

Details
- Draw: 56
- Seeds: 16

Events
Singles	Doubles
← 1982 ·	Family Circle Cup	· 1984 →

Martina Navratilova was the defending champion and won in the final 5–7, 6–1, 6–0 against Tracy Austin.

== Seeds ==
A champion seed is indicated in bold text while text in italics indicates the round in which that seed was eliminated. The top eight seeds received a bye to the second round.

1. (United States) **Martina Navratilova (champion)**
2. (United States) Andrea Jaeger (semifinals)
3. (United States) Tracy Austin (final)
4. (West Germany) Bettina Bunge (semifinals)
5. (Czechoslovakia) Hana Mandlíková (second round)
6. (West Germany) Sylvia Hanika (quarterfinals)
7. (United States) Barbara Potter (third round)
8. (Romania) Virginia Ruzici (quarterfinals)
9. (United States) Zina Garrison (third round)
10. (United States) Kathy Rinaldi (second round)
11. (United States) Bonnie Gadusek (third round)
12. (Hungary) Andrea Temesvári (quarterfinals)
13. (South Africa) Rosalyn Fairbank (first round)
14. (West Germany) Claudia Kohde-Kilsch (second round)
15. n/a
16. n/a

== Draw ==
=== Key ===
- Q = Qualifier
- WC = Wild card
- LL = Lucky loser
- Alt = Alternate
- SE = Special exempt
- PR = Protected ranking
- ITF = ITF entry
- JE = Junior exempt
- w/o = Walkover
- r = Retired
- d = Defaulted
- SR = Special ranking

=== Finals ===
Quarterfinals
1	(United States) **Martina Navratilova**	**7**	4	**6**
12	(Hungary) Andrea Temesvári	6	**6**	2
4	(West Germany) **Bettina Bunge**	**6**	4	**6**
6	(West Germany) Sylvia Hanika	2	**6**	2
(Bulgaria) Manuela Maleeva	3	2
3	(United States) **Tracy Austin**	**6**	**6**
8	(Romania) Virginia Ruzici	3	2
2	(United States) **Andrea Jaeger**	**6**	**6**

Semifinals
1	(United States) **Martina Navratilova**	**6**	**6**
4	(West Germany) Bettina Bunge	2	3
3	(United States) **Tracy Austin**	**7**	**7**
2	(United States) Andrea Jaeger	5	5

Final
1	(United States) **Martina Navratilova**	5	**6**	**6**
3	(United States) Tracy Austin	**7**	1	0

=== Top half ===
==== Section 1 ====
First round
(Argentina) **I Madruga-Osses**	**6**	0	**6**
(Italy) S Simmonds	3	**6**	3
(United States) S Mascarin	**6**	4	1
Q	(Italy) **R Reggi**	1	**6**	**6**
(United States) P Casale	4	6
(United States) **A Moulton**	**6**	**7**
12	(Hungary) **A Temesvári**	**6**	3	**6**
(United States) B Nagelsen	4	**6**	3
(United States) D Gilbert	**6**	4	2
Q	(Czechoslovakia) **M Pazderová**	3	**6**	**6**
(United States) **W White**	**6**	**6**
(France) C Tanvier	2	0

Second round
1	(United States) **M Navratilova**	**6**	**6**
(Argentina) I Madruga-Osses	0	0
Q	(Italy) R Reggi	6	4
(United States) **A Moulton**	**7**	**6**
12	(Hungary) **A Temesvári**	**6**	**6**
Q	(Czechoslovakia) M Pazderová	1	0
(United States) W White	**6**	2	6
7	(United States) **B Potter**	3	**6**	**7**

Third round
1	(United States) **M Navratilova**	**6**	**6**
(United States) A Moulton	1	3
12	(Hungary) **A Temesvári**	**6**	**6**
7	(United States) B Potter	0	4

Quarterfinals
1	(United States) **M Navratilova**	**7**	4	**6**
12	(Hungary) A Temesvári	6	**6**	2

==== Section 2 ====
First round
(Czechoslovakia) **H Suková**	**7**	2	**6**
Q	(Switzerland) C Pasquale	5	**6**	4
Q	(Switzerland) **P Delhees**	**6**	**6**
(South Africa) Y Vermaak	1	3
(Canada) **C Bassett**	**6**	**6**
13	(South Africa) R Fairbank	4	3
9	(United States) **Z Garrison**	6	**6**	**7**
(United States) K Horvath	**7**	4	5
Q	(United States) J Klitch	3	**7**	1
(Australia) **E Goolagong Cawley**	**6**	5	**6**
(United States) N Yeargin	5	**7**	4
Q	(United States) **B Bramblett**	**7**	6	**6**

Second round
4	(West Germany) **B Bunge**	**6**	**6**
(Czechoslovakia) H Suková	2	3
Q	(Switzerland) P Delhees	3	4
(Canada) **C Bassett**	**6**	**6**
9	(United States) **Z Garrison**	**7**	**6**
(Australia) E Goolagong Cawley	5	3
Q	(United States) B Bramblett	4	2
6	(West Germany) **S Hanika**	**6**	**6**

Third round
4	(West Germany) **B Bunge**	**6**	**6**
(Canada) C Bassett	1	3
9	(United States) Z Garrison	0	4
6	(West Germany) **S Hanika**	**6**	**6**

Quarterfinals
4	(West Germany) **B Bunge**	**6**	4	**6**
6	(West Germany) S Hanika	2	**6**	2

=== Bottom half ===
==== Section 3 ====
First round
(Bulgaria) **M Maleeva**	4	**6**	**6**
(France) C Vanier	**6**	2	3
(South Korea) D-H Lee	3	4
(United States) **L Bonder**	**6**	**6**
(Netherlands) M Mesker	3	4
14	(West Germany) **C Kohde-Kilsch**	**6**	**6**
(United States) C Reynolds	2	2
Q	(United States) **T Mochizuki**	**6**	**6**
(United States) S Collins	4	1
(Australia) **D Fromholtz**	**6**	**6**
(United States) **C Benjamin**	1	**6**	**6**
(United States) B Herr	**6**	3	4

Second round
5	(Czechoslovakia) H Mandlíková	**6**	4	4
(Bulgaria) **M Maleeva**	4	**6**	**6**
(United States) **L Bonder**	**6**	**6**
14	(West Germany) C Kohde-Kilsch	3	0
Q	(United States) **T Mochizuki**	1	**7**	**6**
(Australia) D Fromholtz	**6**	5	4
(United States) C Benjamin	3	2
3	(United States) **T Austin**	**6**	**6**

Third round
(Bulgaria) **M Maleeva**	**6**	**6**
(United States) L Bonder	4	3
Q	(United States) T Mochizuki	2	1
3	(United States) **T Austin**	**6**	**6**

Quarterfinals
(Bulgaria) M Maleeva	3	2
3	(United States) **T Austin**	**6**	**6**

==== Section 4 ====
First round
(Socialist Federal Republic of Yugoslavia) **M Jaušovec**	**6**	**6**
(United States) V Nelson	2	1
(United States) L-A Thompson	1	5
Q	(Peru) **L Arraya**	**6**	**7**
(United Kingdom) S Barker	4	**6**	4
10	(United States) **K Rinaldi**	**6**	2	**6**
11	(United States) **B Gadusek**	**6**	**6**
(United States) A Leand	4	0
(West Germany) **E Pfaff**	3	**6**	**6**
(United States) K Latham	**6**	4	4
(Czechoslovakia) I Budařová	2	**6**	2
(Australia) **K Reid**	**6**	4	**6**

Second round
8	(Romania) **V Ruzici**	**6**	**6**
(Socialist Federal Republic of Yugoslavia) M Jaušovec	1	1
Q	(Peru) **L Arraya**	5	**6**	**6**
10	(United States) K Rinaldi	**7**	2	4
11	(United States) **B Gadusek**	**6**	**6**
(West Germany) E Pfaff	3	3
(Australia) K Reid	2	1
2	(United States) **A Jaeger**	**6**	**6**

Third round
8	(Romania) **V Ruzici**	**6**	**6**
Q	(Peru) L Arraya	4	2
11	(United States) B Gadusek	3	4
2	(United States) **A Jaeger**	**6**	**6**

Quarterfinals
8	(Romania) V Ruzici	3	2
2	(United States) **A Jaeger**	**6**	**6**
