= 1989 Family Circle Cup – Singles =

Singles
- 1989 Family Circle Cup

Final
- Champion: (West Germany) Steffi Graf
- Runner-up: (Soviet Union) Natasha Zvereva
- Score: 6–1, 6–1

Details
- Draw: 56
- Seeds: 16

Events
Singles	Doubles
← 1988 ·	Family Circle Cup	· 1990 →

Martina Navratilova was the defending champion but lost in the semifinals to Natasha Zvereva.

Steffi Graf won in the final 6–1, 6–1 against Zvereva.

== Seeds ==
A champion seed is indicated in bold text while text in italics indicates the round in which that seed was eliminated. The top eight seeds received a bye to the second round.

1. (West Germany) **Steffi Graf (champion)**
2. (United States) Martina Navratilova (semifinals)
3. n/a - Zina Garrison, originally seeded third, withdrew from the tournament due to an injury.
4. (Soviet Union) Natasha Zvereva (final)
5. (United States) Lori McNeil (third round)
6. (Canada) Helen Kelesi (third round)
7. (Spain) Arantxa Sánchez (semifinals)
8. (Australia) Hana Mandlíková (quarterfinals)
9. (Italy) Sandra Cecchini (third round)
10. (Sweden) Catarina Lindqvist (third round)
11. (Argentina) Bettina Fulco (third round)
12. (Italy) Raffaella Reggi (second round)
13. (Austria) Judith Wiesner (first round)
14. (United States) Terry Phelps (first round)
15. n/a
16. n/a

== Draw ==
=== Key ===
- Q = Qualifier
- WC = Wild card
- LL = Lucky loser
- Alt = Alternate
- SE = Special exempt
- PR = Protected ranking
- ITF = ITF entry
- JE = Junior exempt
- w/o = Walkover
- r = Retired
- d = Defaulted
- SR = Special ranking

=== Finals ===
Semifinals
1	(West Germany) **Steffi Graf**	**6**	**6**
7	(Spain) Arantxa Sánchez	2	4
4	(Soviet Union) **Natasha Zvereva**	**6**	3	**6**
2	(United States) Martina Navratilova	2	**6**	1

Final
1	(West Germany) **Steffi Graf**	**6**	**6**
4	(Soviet Union) Natasha Zvereva	1	1

=== Top half ===
==== Section 1 ====
First round
Q	(United Kingdom) C Wood	**6**	2	3
(South Africa) **R Fairbank**	1	**6**	**6**
(United States) S Martin	4	3
Q	(Czechoslovakia) **R Rajchrtová**	**6**	**6**
Q	(Argentina) A Villagrán	2	2
(West Germany) **I Cueto**	**6**	**6**
14	(United States) T Phelps	**7**	6	2
(Czechoslovakia) **R Zrubáková**	5	**7**	**6**
(United States) H Na	5	2
(West Germany) **W Probst**	**7**	**6**
Q	(Hungary) **A Temesvári**	**6**	**7**
(United States) E Hakami	2	5

Second round
1	(West Germany) **S Graf**	**6**	**6**
(South Africa) R Fairbank	4	3
Q	(Czechoslovakia) **R Rajchrtová**	**7**	**6**
(West Germany) I Cueto	6	2
(Czechoslovakia) **R Zrubáková**	3	**6**	**6**
(West Germany) W Probst	**6**	4	2
Q	(Hungary) A Temesvári	5	2
6	(Canada) **H Kelesi**	**7**	**6**

Third round
1	(West Germany) **S Graf**	**6**	**6**
Q	(Czechoslovakia) R Rajchrtová	0	2
(Czechoslovakia) **R Zrubáková**	6	**6**	**7**
6	(Canada) H Kelesi	**7**	4	6

Quarterfinals
1	(West Germany) **S Graf**	**6**	**6**
(Czechoslovakia) R Zrubáková	2	1

==== Section 2 ====
First round
(Italy) **L Ferrando**	**6**	**6**
(United States) R Casals	0	0
(United States) **S Stafford**	4	**7**	**6**
(United States) D Faber	**6**	6	4
(Italy) L Lapi	**6**	5	0
9	(Italy) **S Cecchini**	3	**7**	**6**
12	(Italy) **R Reggi**	**6**	**7**
(United States) K Kessaris	4	6
(United States) M Torres	2	2
(Czechoslovakia) **J Pospíšilová**	**6**	**6**
(Italy) L Garrone	5	4
(United Kingdom) **S Gomer**	**7**	**6**

Second round
LL	(Czechoslovakia) A Holíková	2	4
(Italy) **L Ferrando**	**6**	**6**
(United States) S Stafford	0	**7**	3
9	(Italy) **S Cecchini**	**6**	6	**6**
12	(Italy) R Reggi	5	4
(Czechoslovakia) **J Pospíšilová**	**7**	**6**
(United Kingdom) S Gomer	0	0
7	(Spain) **A Sánchez**	**6**	**6**

Third round
(Italy) **L Ferrando**	**6**	**7**
9	(Italy) S Cecchini	1	5
(Czechoslovakia) J Pospíšilová	3	**6**	1
7	(Spain) **A Sánchez**	**6**	3	**6**

Quarterfinals
(Italy) L Ferrando	5	1
7	(Spain) **A Sánchez**	**7**	**6**

=== Bottom half ===
==== Section 3 ====
First round
(South Africa) **K Schimper**	4	**6**	**6**
(Sweden) M Strandlund	**6**	3	2
(Netherlands) **B Schultz**	2	**6**	**6**
(Greece) A Kanellopoulou	**6**	3	2
Q	(Czechoslovakia) R Maršíková	2	1
(Soviet Union) **L Meskhi**	**6**	**6**
13	(Austria) J Wiesner	4	3
(Argentina) **M Paz**	**6**	**6**
(United States) C Reynolds	1	1
Q	(South Africa) **A Coetzer**	**6**	**6**
(Argentina) P Tarabini	**6**	6	3
(United States) **W White**	2	**7**	**6**

Second round
5	(United States) **L McNeil**	**6**	**7**
(South Africa) K Schimper	3	5
(Netherlands) B Schultz	6	3
(Soviet Union) **L Meskhi**	**7**	**6**
(Argentina) M Paz	6	4
Q	(South Africa) **A Coetzer**	**7**	**6**
(United States) W White	1	2
4	(Soviet Union) **N Zvereva**	**6**	**6**

Third round
5	(United States) L McNeil	1	2
(Soviet Union) **L Meskhi**	**6**	**6**
Q	(South Africa) A Coetzer	4	**6**	0
4	(Soviet Union) **N Zvereva**	**6**	3	**6**

Quarterfinals
(Soviet Union) L Meskhi	3	2
4	(Soviet Union) **N Zvereva**	**6**	**6**

==== Section 4 ====
First round
(Italy) F Bonsignori	**6**	3	4
(France) **J Halard**	2	**6**	**6**
(Czechoslovakia) **I Budařová**	**6**	**6**
Q	(France) M-C Damas	4	1
(Czechoslovakia) P Langrová	5	3
11	(Argentina) **B Fulco**	**7**	**6**
10	(Sweden) **C Lindqvist**	**6**	**6**
(United States) M L Daniels	1	1
(Socialist Federal Republic of Yugoslavia) S Goleš	1	5
(United States) **C Benjamin**	**6**	**7**
Q	(France) M Pierce	**7**	1	3
(Peru) **L Gildemeister**	5	**6**	**6**

Second round
8	(Australia) **H Mandlíková**	**6**	**6**
(France) J Halard	4	2
(Czechoslovakia) I Budařová	3	**6**	1
11	(Argentina) **B Fulco**	**6**	4	**6**
10	(Sweden) **C Lindqvist**	3	**6**	**6**
(United States) C Benjamin	**6**	4	1
(Peru) L Gildemeister	4	**6**	0
2	(United States) **M Navratilova**	**6**	4	**6**

Third round
8	(Australia) **H Mandlíková**	**6**	**6**
11	(Argentina) B Fulco	1	2
10	(Sweden) C Lindqvist	4	2
2	(United States) **M Navratilova**	**6**	**6**

Quarterfinals
8	(Australia) H Mandlíková	2	5
2	(United States) **M Navratilova**	**6**	**7**
