= 1988 Family Circle Cup – Singles =

Singles
- 1988 Family Circle Cup

Final
- Champion: (United States) Martina Navratilova
- Runner-up: (Argentina) Gabriela Sabatini
- Score: 6–1, 4–6, 6–4

Details
- Draw: 56
- Seeds: 16

Events
Singles	Doubles
← 1987 ·	Family Circle Cup	· 1989 →

Steffi Graf was the defending champion but did not compete that year.

Martina Navratilova won in the final 6–1, 4–6, 6–4 against Gabriela Sabatini.

== Seeds ==
A champion seed is indicated in bold text while text in italics indicates the round in which that seed was eliminated. The top eight seeds received a bye to the second round.

1. (United States) **Martina Navratilova (champion)**
2. (Argentina) Gabriela Sabatini (final)
3. (Bulgaria) Manuela Maleeva (semifinals)
4. (West Germany) Claudia Kohde-Kilsch (third round)
5. (United States) Lori McNeil (quarterfinals)
6. (United States) Zina Garrison (semifinals)
7. n/a - Mary Joe Fernandez, originally seeded seventh, withdrew from the tournament with a fever.
8. (Italy) Raffaella Reggi (quarterfinals)
9. (West Germany) Sylvia Hanika (quarterfinals)
10. (Italy) Sandra Cecchini (third round)
11. (West Germany) Isabel Cueto (first round)
12. (Czechoslovakia) Jana Novotná (second round)
13. (Austria) Judith Wiesner (second round)
14. (Canada) Helen Kelesi (quarterfinals)
15. n/a
16. n/a

== Draw ==
=== Key ===
- Q = Qualifier
- WC = Wild card
- LL = Lucky loser
- Alt = Alternate
- SE = Special exempt
- PR = Protected ranking
- ITF = ITF entry
- JE = Junior exempt
- w/o = Walkover
- r = Retired
- d = Defaulted
- SR = Special ranking

=== Finals ===
Semifinals
1	(United States) **Martina Navratilova**	6	**6**	**6**
3	(Bulgaria) Manuela Maleeva	**7**	4	2
6	(United States) Zina Garrison	0	0
2	(Argentina) **Gabriela Sabatini**	**6**	**6**

Final
1	(United States) **Martina Navratilova**	**6**	4	**6**
2	(Argentina) Gabriela Sabatini	1	**6**	4

=== Top half ===
==== Section 1 ====
First round
(South Africa) D van Rensburg	2	1
(United States) **T Phelps**	**6**	**6**
(West Germany) E Pfaff	2	3
(Argentina) **M Paz**	**6**	**6**
(United States) B Bowes	1	0
12	(Czechoslovakia) **J Novotná**	**6**	**6**
Q	(Peru) P Vásquez	0	**7**	4
Q	(United States) **P Casale**	**6**	6	**6**
(South Africa) **E Reinach**	**7**	**6**
(United States) M L Daniels	6	4
Q	(United States) W Wood	2	6
(United States) **C Benjamin**	**6**	**7**

Second round
1	(United States) **M Navratilova**	**6**	**6**
(United States) T Phelps	1	1
(Argentina) **M Paz**	**6**	**6**
12	(Czechoslovakia) J Novotná	2	2
Q	(United States) P Casale	**7**	0	2
(South Africa) **E Reinach**	6	**6**	**6**
(United States) C Benjamin	**7**	3	2
8	(Italy) **R Reggi**	5	**6**	**6**

Third round
1	(United States) **M Navratilova**	**6**	**6**
(Argentina) M Paz	3	2
(South Africa) E Reinach	6	3
8	(Italy) **R Reggi**	**7**	**6**

Quarterfinals
1	(United States) **M Navratilova**	4	**6**	**6**
8	(Italy) R Reggi	**6**	2	3

==== Section 2 ====
First round
(South Africa) **K Schimper**	**6**	**6**
Q	(United States) S Martin	3	2
(Czechoslovakia) **I Budařová**	**6**	1	**6**
Q	(Greece) A Kanellopoulou	3	**6**	4
(Switzerland) E Krapl	6	0
10	(Italy) **S Cecchini**	**7**	**6**
13	(Austria) **J Wiesner**	**6**	**6**
(United States) R Casals	1	2
(United States) H Na	5	0
Q	(Czechoslovakia) **A Holíková**	**7**	**6**
(Italy) **F Bonsignori**	3	**7**	**7**
(Brazil) G Miró	**6**	6	5

Second round
3	(Bulgaria) **M Maleeva**	**6**	**6**
(South Africa) K Schimper	0	0
(Czechoslovakia) I Budařová	**6**	1	0
10	(Italy) **S Cecchini**	3	**6**	**6**
13	(Austria) J Wiesner	2	**6**	3
Q	(Czechoslovakia) **A Holíková**	**6**	1	**6**
(Italy) F Bonsignori	1	5
5	(United States) **L McNeil**	**6**	**7**

Third round
3	(Bulgaria) **M Maleeva**	**6**	**6**
10	(Italy) S Cecchini	1	1
Q	(Czechoslovakia) A Holíková	**6**	1	4
5	(United States) **L McNeil**	2	**6**	**6**

Quarterfinals
3	(Bulgaria) **M Maleeva**	**7**	**6**
5	(United States) L McNeil	6	4

=== Bottom half ===
==== Section 3 ====
First round
(United States) P Smith	0	2
(Austria) **P Huber**	**6**	**6**
(Italy) **L Garrone**	**7**	**6**
(United States) G Magers	6	1
(Argentina) **B Fulco**	**6**	**6**
11	(West Germany) I Cueto	3	1
14	(Canada) **H Kelesi**	**6**	**7**
(United States) M Torres	3	6
(United States) W White	3	1
(Argentina) **A Villagrán**	**6**	**6**
(United States) **E Hakami**	4	**6**	**6**
(United States) K Horvath	**6**	3	3

Second round
6	(United States) **Z Garrison**	**6**	**7**
(Austria) P Huber	4	5
(Italy) L Garrone	3	5
(Argentina) **B Fulco**	**6**	**7**
14	(Canada) **H Kelesi**	**6**	**6**
(Argentina) A Villagrán	3	4
(United States) E Hakami	5	4
4	(West Germany) **C Kohde-Kilsch**	**7**	**6**

Third round
6	(United States) **Z Garrison**	**6**	**6**
(Argentina) B Fulco	2	1
14	(Canada) **H Kelesi**	**6**	**7**
4	(West Germany) C Kohde-Kilsch	4	5

Quarterfinals
6	(United States) **Z Garrison**	**7**	**6**
14	(Canada) H Kelesi	6	1

==== Section 4 ====
First round
(Socialist Federal Republic of Yugoslavia) **S Goleš**	**7**	**6**
Q	(Argentina) G Mosca	5	1
(Spain) **A Sánchez**	**6**	**6**
Q	(West Germany) A Betzner	2	4
(Belgium) S Wasserman	5	**6**	2
9	(West Germany) **S Hanika**	**7**	2	**6**
(West Germany) **W Probst**	**6**	**6**
(United States) C MacGregor	4	4
(Poland) **I Kuczyńska**	4	**6**	**6**
(United States) C Reynolds	**6**	0	0
(Argentina) **P Tarabini**	**7**	**6**
(United States) K Adams	5	3

Second round
LL	(Italy) L Lapi	4	4
(Socialist Federal Republic of Yugoslavia) **S Goleš**	**6**	**6**
(Spain) A Sánchez	5	2
9	(West Germany) **S Hanika**	**7**	**6**
(West Germany) **W Probst**	**6**	**6**
(Poland) I Kuczyńska	1	4
(Argentina) P Tarabini	1	2
2	(Argentina) **G Sabatini**	**6**	**6**

Third round
(Socialist Federal Republic of Yugoslavia) S Goleš	2	3
9	(West Germany) **S Hanika**	**6**	**6**
(West Germany) W Probst	4	1
2	(Argentina) **G Sabatini**	**6**	**6**

Quarterfinals
9	(West Germany) S Hanika	2	2
2	(Argentina) **G Sabatini**	**6**	**6**
