= 1977 Family Circle Cup – Singles =

Singles
- 1977 Family Circle Cup

Final
- Champion: (United States) Chris Evert
- Runner-up: (United States) Billie Jean King
- Score: 6–0, 6–1

Details
- Draw: 32
- Seeds: 8

Events
Singles	Doubles
← 1976 ·	Family Circle Cup	· 1978 →

Chris Evert was the reigning singles champion at the Family Circle Cup tennis tournament, and defended her title, defeating Billie Jean King in the final, 6–0, 6–1. The draw consisted of 32 players of which 8 were seeded.

== Seeds ==
1. (United States) Chris Evert (champion)
2. (United Kingdom) Virginia Wade (second round)
3. (United States) Rosie Casals (Quarterfinal)
4. (Netherlands) Betty Stöve (second round)
5. (Australia) Dianne Fromholtz (second round)
6. (Socialist Federal Republic of Yugoslavia) Mima Jaušovec (semifinal)
7. (France) Françoise Dürr (first round)
8. (United States) Billie Jean King (final)

== Draw ==
=== Finals ===
Semifinals
1	(United States) Chris Evert	6	6
6	(Socialist Federal Republic of Yugoslavia) Mima Jaušovec	3	3
(Australia) Kerry Reid	3	6
8	(United States) Billie Jean King	6	7

Final
1	(United States) Chris Evert	6	6
8	(United States) Billie Jean King	0	1

=== Top half ===
First round
1	(United States) Chris Evert	6	6
(United States) Bunny Bruning	0	3
(Australia) Wendy Turnbull	7	6
(United States) Janet Newberry	5	0
(United States) Kathy May	6	6
7	(France) Françoise Dürr	4	2
(United States) Betsy Nagelsen	4	6	6
(United States) Julie Anthony	6	2	1
3	(United States) Rosie Casals	6	6
(United States) Kathleen Harter	2	3
(United States) Mary Struthers	4	7	3
(United States) Lele Forood	6	5	3^{r}

Second round
1	(United States) Chris Evert	6	6
(Australia) Wendy Turnbull	1	0
(United States) Kathy May	7	6
(United States) Betsy Nagelsen	5	3
3	(United States) Rosie Casals	6	5	7
(United States) Laura duPont	2	7	5
6	(Socialist Federal Republic of Yugoslavia) Mima Jaušovec	3	6	6
(United States) Mary Struthers	6	3	1

Quarterfinals
1	(United States) Chris Evert	6	6
(United States) Kathy May	1	0
3	(United States) Rosie Casals	3	4
6	(Socialist Federal Republic of Yugoslavia) Mima Jaušovec	6	6

Semifinals
1	(United States) Chris Evert	6	6
6	(Socialist Federal Republic of Yugoslavia) Mima Jaušovec	3	3

=== Bottom half ===
First round
(United States) Tracy Austin	4	6	6
(United States) Kate Latham	6	3	1
5	(Australia) Dianne Fromholtz	6	4	7
(United States) Valerie Ziegenfuss	3	6	5
(Australia) Kerry Reid	6	6
(United States) Mona Guerrant	2	1
4	(Netherlands) Betty Stöve	6	6	6
(Sweden) Ingrid Bentzer	2	7	2
(Romania) Virginia Ruzici	4	6	6
(United Kingdom) Lindsey Beaven	6	3	1
8	(United States) Billie Jean King	0	7	6
(United States) Nancy Richey	6	6	2
(West Germany) Renáta Tomanová	7	7
(United States) Marcie Louie	5	6
(United States) Pam Teeguarden	2	3
2	(United Kingdom) Virginia Wade	6	6

Second round
(United States) Tracy Austin	7	6
5	(Australia) Dianne Fromholtz	5	4
(Australia) Kerry Reid	6	6
4	(Netherlands) Betty Stöve	3	1
(Romania) Virginia Ruzici	1	5
8	(United States) Billie Jean King	6	7
(West Germany) Renáta Tomanová	6	6
2	(United Kingdom) Virginia Wade	1	4

Quarterfinals
(United States) Tracy Austin	3	5
(Australia) Kerry Reid	6	7
8	(United States) Billie Jean King	6	7
(West Germany) Renáta Tomanová	3	5

Semifinals
(Australia) Kerry Reid	3	6
8	(United States) Billie Jean King	6	7
