= 1989 Family Circle Cup – Doubles =

Doubles
- 1989 Family Circle Cup

Final
- Champions: (Australia) Hana Mandlíková (United States) Martina Navratilova
- Runners-up: (United States) Mary Lou Daniels (United States) Wendy White
- Score: 6–4, 6–1

Details
- Draw: 28
- Seeds: 8

Events
Singles	Doubles
← 1988 ·	Family Circle Cup	· 1990 →

Lori McNeil and Martina Navratilova were the defending champions but they competed with different partners that year, McNeil with Kathy Foxworth and Navratilova with Hana Mandlíková.

Foxworth and McNeil lost in the second round to Catherine Suire and Patricia Tarabini.

Mandlíková and Navratilova won in the final 6–4, 6–1 against Mary Lou Daniels and Wendy White.

== Seeds ==
Champion seeds are indicated in bold text while text in italics indicates the round in which those seeds were eliminated. The top four seeded teams received byes into the second round.

1. (Soviet Union) Larisa Savchenko / (Soviet Union) Natasha Zvereva (second round)
2. (Australia) **Hana Mandlíková** / (United States) **Martina Navratilova (champions)**
3. (South Africa) Rosalyn Fairbank / (Argentina) Mercedes Paz (second round)
4. (United States) Terry Phelps / (Italy) Raffaella Reggi (second round)
5. (United States) Rosemary Casals / (United States) Candy Reynolds (first round)
6. (Italy) Sandra Cecchini / (Socialist Federal Republic of Yugoslavia) Sabrina Goleš (first round)
7. (France) Catherine Suire / (Argentina) Patricia Tarabini (quarterfinals)
8. (United States) Sandy Collins / (Soviet Union) Leila Meskhi (semifinals)

== Draw ==
=== Key ===
- Q = Qualifier
- WC = Wild card
- LL = Lucky loser
- Alt = Alternate
- SE = Special exempt
- PR = Protected ranking
- ITF = ITF entry
- JE = Junior exempt
- w/o = Walkover
- r = Retired
- d = Defaulted
- SR = Special ranking

=== Final ===
Final

- (United States) Mary Lou Daniels
- (United States) Wendy White
4
1

2
- (Australia) **Hana Mandlíková**
- (United States) **Martina Navratilova**
**6**
**6**

=== Top half ===
First round

Second round

Quarterfinals

Semifinals

1
- (Soviet Union) L Savchenko
- (Soviet Union) N Zvereva
3
4

- (Italy) L Ferrando
- (Italy) S La Fratta
4
2

- (United States) **J Smoller**
- (Sweden) **M Strandlund**
**6**
**6**

- (United States) **J Smoller**
- (Sweden) **M Strandlund**
**6**
**6**

- (United States) J Smoller
- (Sweden) M Strandlund
4
6

- (United States) **M Norwood**
- (United States) **J Thomas**
**6**
**7**

- (United States) **M L Daniels**
- (United States) **W White**
**6**
**7**

- (West Germany) W Probst
- (Czechoslovakia) R Zrubáková
4
6

- (United States) M Norwood
- (United States) J Thomas
2
1

- (United States) **M L Daniels**
- (United States) **W White**
**6**
**6**

- (United States) **M L Daniels**
- (United States) **W White**
**6**
**6**

5
- (United States) R Casals
- (United States) C Reynolds
3
2

- (United States) **M L Daniels**
- (United States) **W White**
**6**
**6**

8
- (United States) S Collins
- (Soviet Union) L Meskhi
2
1

3
- (South Africa) R Fairbank
- (Argentina) M Paz
6
3

- (West Germany) I Cueto
- (Italy) L Garrone
5
3

- (United States) **E Hakami**
- (South Africa) **K Schimper**
**7**
**6**

- (United States) **E Hakami**
- (South Africa) **K Schimper**
**7**
**6**

- (United States) E Hakami
- (South Africa) K Schimper
3
4

- (Argentina) B Fulco
- (Argentina) A Villagrán
1
1

8
- (United States) **S Collins**
- (Soviet Union) **L Meskhi**
**6**
**6**

- (Czechoslovakia) **R Maršíková**
- (Czechoslovakia) **R Rajchrtová**
**6**
**6**

- (Czechoslovakia) R Maršíková
- (Czechoslovakia) R Rajchrtová
2
4

- (Argentina) G Mosca
- (Brazil) A Vieira
3
0

8
- (United States) **S Collins**
- (Soviet Union) **L Meskhi**
**6**
**6**

8
- (United States) **S Collins**
- (Soviet Union) **L Meskhi**
**6**
**6**

=== Bottom half ===
First round

Second round

Quarterfinals

Semifinals

6
(Italy) S Cecchini
(Socialist Federal Republic of Yugoslavia) S Goleš
3
**6**
4

- (Peru) **L Gildemeister**
- (Netherlands) **B Schultz**
**6**
4
**6**

- (Peru) L Gildemeister
- (Netherlands) B Schultz
6
4

- (Czechoslovakia) I Budařová
- (United Kingdom) C Wood
4
3

- (West Germany) **B Bunge**
- (Sweden) **C Lindqvist**
**7**
**6**

- (West Germany) **B Bunge**
- (Sweden) **C Lindqvist**
**6**
**6**

- (West Germany) **B Bunge**
- (Sweden) **C Lindqvist**
4
**7**
**7**

- (South Africa) A Coetzer
- (West Germany) S Frankl
1
4

- (Spain) A Sánchez
- (Austria) J Wiesner
**6**
6
6

- (Spain) **A Sánchez**
- (Austria) **J Wiesner**
**6**
**6**

- (Spain) **A Sánchez**
- (Austria) **J Wiesner**
**6**
**6**

4
- (United States) T Phelps
- (Italy) R Reggi
1
4

- (West Germany) B Bunge
- (Sweden) C Lindqvist
5
0

7
- (France) **C Suire**
- (Argentina) **P Tarabini**
4
**6**
**6**

2
- (Australia) **H Mandlíková**
- (United States) **M Navratilova**
**7**
**6**

- (Poland) R Baranski
- (United States) T Whittington
**6**
1
1

7
- (France) **C Suire**
- (Argentina) **P Tarabini**
**6**
**6**

- (United States) **K Foxworth**
- (United States) **L McNeil**
**6**
3
**7**

- (United States) K Foxworth
- (United States) L McNeil
2
2

- (United States) B Bowes
- (United States) H Na
4
**6**
6

7
- (France) C Suire
- (Argentina) P Tarabini
2
1

- (United States) **C Benjamin**
- (United States) **J Kaplan**
6
**6**
**6**

2
- (Australia) **H Mandlíková**
- (United States) **M Navratilova**
**6**
**6**

- (Czechoslovakia) P Langrová
- (Czechoslovakia) J Pospíšilová
**7**
4
0

- (United States) C Benjamin
- (United States) J Kaplan
3
3

2
- (Australia) **H Mandlíková**
- (United States) **M Navratilova**
**6**
**6**
