= 1983 Family Circle Cup – Doubles =

Doubles
- 1983 Family Circle Cup

Final
- Champions: (United States) Martina Navratilova (United States) Candy Reynolds
- Runners-up: (United States) Andrea Jaeger (United States) Paula Smith
- Score: 6–2, 6–3

Details
- Draw: 32
- Seeds: 8

Events
Singles	Doubles
← 1982 ·	Family Circle Cup	· 1984 →

Martina Navratilova and Pam Shriver were the defending champions but only Navratilova competed that year with Candy Reynolds.

Navratilova and Reynolds won in the final 6–2, 6–3 against Andrea Jaeger and Paula Smith.

== Seeds ==
Champion seeds are indicated in bold text while text in italics indicates the round in which those seeds were eliminated.

1. (United States) **Martina Navratilova** / (United States) **Candy Reynolds (champions)**
2. (West Germany) Claudia Kohde-Kilsch / (West Germany) Eva Pfaff (second round)
3. (United States) Leslie Allen / (United States) Rosemary Casals (second round)
4. (United States) Andrea Jaeger / (United States) Paula Smith (final)
5. (United States) Kathleen Horvath / (South Africa) Yvonne Vermaak (second round)
6. (Czechoslovakia) Hana Mandlíková / (Romania) Virginia Ruzici (semifinals)
7. (Socialist Federal Republic of Yugoslavia) Mima Jaušovec / (Czechoslovakia) Helena Suková (first round)
8. (Brazil) Patricia Medrado / (Brazil) Cláudia Monteiro (second round)

== Draw ==
=== Key ===
- Q = Qualifier
- WC = Wild card
- LL = Lucky loser
- Alt = Alternate
- SE = Special exempt
- PR = Protected ranking
- ITF = ITF entry
- JE = Junior exempt
- w/o = Walkover
- r = Retired
- d = Defaulted
- SR = Special ranking

=== Final ===
Final
1	(United States) **Martina Navratilova** (United States) **Candy Reynolds**	**6**	**6**
4	(United States) Andrea Jaeger (United States) Paula Smith	2	3

=== Top half ===
First round
1	(United States) **M Navratilova** (United States) **C Reynolds**	**6**	**6**
(Canada) C Bassett (United States) Z Garrison	2	4
(Australia) B Remilton (Australia) A Tobin	1	**6**	0
(Australia) **D Fromholtz** (United States) **A Moulton**	**6**	2	**6**
(United States) P Casale (United States) K Sands	2	1
(United States) **S Mascarin** (Australia) **E Sayers**	**6**	**6**
(United States) S Collins (Netherlands) M Mesker	**6**	3	4
8	(Brazil) **P Medrado** (Brazil) **C Monteiro**	2	**6**	**6**
3	(United States) **L Allen** (United States) **R Casals**	**7**	**6**
(United States) C Benjamin (France) C Vanier	6	4
(United States) A-M Fernandez (United States) B Norton	**6**	5	6
(South Africa) **R Fairbank** (United States) **B Nagelsen**	3	**7**	**7**
(Australia) **C O'Neil** (Australia) **P Whytcross**	6	**6**	**6**
(United States) K Jones-Shaefer (United States) N Yeargin	**7**	4	2
(United States) B Buckley (United States) B Bruning	3	3
6	(Czechoslovakia) **H Mandlíková** (Romania) **V Ruzici**	**6**	**6**

Second round
1	(United States) **M Navratilova** (United States) **C Reynolds**	**6**	**6**
(Australia) D Fromholtz (United States) A Moulton	1	2
(United States) **S Mascarin** (Australia) **E Sayers**	**6**	**6**
8	(Brazil) P Medrado (Brazil) C Monteiro	4	0
3	(United States) L Allen (United States) R Casals	3	1
(South Africa) **R Fairbank** (United States) **B Nagelsen**	**6**	**6**
(Australia) C O'Neil (Australia) P Whytcross	2	3
6	(Czechoslovakia) **H Mandlíková** (Romania) **V Ruzici**	**6**	**6**

Quarterfinals
1	(United States) **M Navratilova** (United States) **C Reynolds**	**6**	**7**
(United States) S Mascarin (Australia) E Sayers	4	5
(South Africa) R Fairbank (United States) B Nagelsen	**7**	2	3
6	(Czechoslovakia) **H Mandlíková** (Romania) **V Ruzici**	6	**6**	**6**

Semifinals
1	(United States) **M Navratilova** (United States) **C Reynolds**	**6**	**6**
6	(Czechoslovakia) H Mandlíková (Romania) V Ruzici	1	1

=== Bottom half ===
First round
5	(United States) **K Horvath** (South Africa) **Y Vermaak**	**7**	**6**
(Switzerland) P Delhees (Italy) S Simmonds	6	1
(United Kingdom) **S Barker** (Netherlands) **B Stöve**	6	**6**	**6**
(United States) T Mochizuki (Republic of Ireland) J O'Brien	**7**	3	3
(Peru) L Arraya (Czechoslovakia) K Skronská	2	1
(United States) **B Gadusek** (United States) **W White**	**6**	**6**
(Czechoslovakia) I Budařová (Czechoslovakia) R Tomanová	0	1
4	(United States) **A Jaeger** (United States) **P Smith**	**6**	**6**
7	(Socialist Federal Republic of Yugoslavia) M Jaušovec (Czechoslovakia) H Suková	3	**6**	4
(United States) **J Klitch** (Argentina) **I Madruga-Osses**	**6**	1	**6**
(France) **C Tanvier** (Hungary) **A Temesvári**	**6**	**6**
(United States) J Davis (United States) K Latham	2	1
(West Germany) **B Bunge** (Australia) **E Goolagong Cawley**	**7**	**6**
(United States) J Filkoff (United States) V Nelson	6	0
(United States) L Bonder (United States) B Herr	2	4
2	(West Germany) **C Kohde-Kilsch** (West Germany) **E Pfaff**	**6**	**6**

Second round
5	(United States) K Horvath (South Africa) Y Vermaak	2	**6**	4
(United Kingdom) **S Barker** (Netherlands) **B Stöve**	**6**	4	**6**
(United States) B Gadusek (United States) W White	2	1
4	(United States) **A Jaeger** (United States) **P Smith**	**6**	**6**
(United States) J Klitch (Argentina) I Madruga-Osses	4	3
(France) **C Tanvier** (Hungary) **A Temesvári**	**6**	**6**
(West Germany) **B Bunge** (Australia) **E Goolagong Cawley**	**6**	**6**
2	(West Germany) C Kohde-Kilsch (West Germany) E Pfaff	3	2

Quarterfinals
(United Kingdom) S Barker (Netherlands) B Stöve	3	2
4	(United States) **A Jaeger** (United States) **P Smith**	**6**	**6**
(France) **C Tanvier** (Hungary) **A Temesvári**	**7**	**7**
(West Germany) B Bunge (Australia) E Goolagong Cawley	6	6

Semifinals
4	(United States) **A Jaeger** (United States) **P Smith**	**6**	**6**
(France) C Tanvier (Hungary) A Temesvári	4	4
