= 1988 Family Circle Cup – Doubles =

Doubles
- 1988 Family Circle Cup

Final
- Champions: (United States) Lori McNeil (United States) Martina Navratilova
- Runners-up: (West Germany) Claudia Kohde-Kilsch (Argentina) Gabriela Sabatini
- Score: 6–2, 2–6, 6–3

Events
Singles	Doubles
← 1987 ·	Family Circle Cup	· 1989 →

Mercedes Paz and Eva Pfaff were the defending champions but they competed with different partners that year, Paz with Mary Lou Daniels and Pfaff with Zina Garrison.

Daniels and Paz lost in the second round to Bettina Fulco and Emilse Raponi-Longo.

Garrison and Pfaff lost in the semifinals to Lori McNeil and Martina Navratilova.

McNeil and Navratilova won in the final 6–2, 2–6, 6–3 against Claudia Kohde-Kilsch and Gabriela Sabatini.

== Seeds ==
Champion seeds are indicated in bold text while text in italics indicates the round in which those seeds were eliminated. The top four seeded teams received byes into the second round.

1. (West Germany) Claudia Kohde-Kilsch / (Argentina) Gabriela Sabatini (final)
2. (United States) **Lori McNeil** / (United States) **Martina Navratilova (champions)**
3. (United States) Zina Garrison / (West Germany) Eva Pfaff (semifinals)
4. (United States) Mary Lou Daniels / (Argentina) Mercedes Paz (second round)
5. (United States) Katrina Adams / (United States) Penny Barg (first round)
6. (United States) Candy Reynolds / (United States) Paula Smith (second round)
7. (Bulgaria) Katerina Maleeva / (Bulgaria) Manuela Maleeva (first round)
8. (United States) Cammy MacGregor / (United States) Cynthia MacGregor (first round)

== Draw ==
=== Key ===
- Q = Qualifier
- WC = Wild card
- LL = Lucky loser
- Alt = Alternate
- SE = Special exempt
- PR = Protected ranking
- ITF = ITF entry
- JE = Junior exempt
- w/o = Walkover
- r = Retired
- d = Defaulted
- SR = Special ranking

=== Final ===
Final
1	(West Germany) Claudia Kohde-Kilsch (Argentina) Gabriela Sabatini	2	**6**	3
2	(United States) **Lori McNeil** (United States) **Martina Navratilova**	**6**	2	**6**

=== Top half ===
First round
(Argentina) G Mosca (Argentina) A Villagrán	2	0
(United States) **G Magers** (United States) **W White**	**6**	**6**
(United States) E Hakami (South Africa) K Schimper	5	**7**	1
(Italy) **L Garrone** (South Africa) **E Reinach**	**7**	6	**6**
(Czechoslovakia) A Holíková (United States) M Torres	1	2
6	(United States) **C Reynolds** (United States) **P Smith**	**6**	**6**
(Argentina) **B Fulco** (United States) **E Raponi-Longo**	**6**	6	**6**
(United States) V Nelson-Dunbar (United States) K Steinmetz	2	**7**	1
(West Germany) W Probst (Argentina) P Tarabini	1	6
(United States) **M J Fernández** (Canada) **H Kelesi**	**6**	**7**
(United States) **C Benjamin** (United States) **H Na**	**7**	**6**
8	(United States) Ca MacGregor (United States) Cy MacGregor	6	4

Second round
1	(West Germany) **C Kohde-Kilsch** (Argentina) **G Sabatini**	**6**	**7**
(United States) G Magers (United States) W White	1	6
(Italy) **L Garrone** (South Africa) **E Reinach**	**7**	6	**7**
6	(United States) C Reynolds (United States) P Smith	6	**7**	6
4	(United States) M L Daniels (Argentina) M Paz	4	3
(Argentina) **B Fulco** (United States) **E Raponi-Longo**	**6**	**6**
(United States) M J Fernández (Canada) H Kelesi
(United States) **C Benjamin** (United States) **H Na**	**w/o**

Quarterfinals
1	(West Germany) **C Kohde-Kilsch** (Argentina) **G Sabatini**	**7**	**6**
(Italy) L Garrone (South Africa) E Reinach	5	1
(Argentina) **B Fulco** (United States) **E Raponi-Longo**	**6**	**7**
(United States) C Benjamin (United States) H Na	4	6

Semifinals
1	(West Germany) **C Kohde-Kilsch** (Argentina) **G Sabatini**	**6**	**6**
(Argentina) B Fulco (United States) E Raponi-Longo	1	2

=== Bottom half ===
First round
7	(Bulgaria) K Maleeva (Bulgaria) M Maleeva	3	4
(Czechoslovakia) **I Budařová** (United States) **J Kaplan**	**6**	**6**
(United States) **K Horvath** (South Africa) **D Van Rensburg**	**6**	1	**7**
(United States) T Phelps (Italy) R Reggi	2	**6**	6
(United States) D-A Hansel (United States) W Wood	**6**	0	2
(United States) **B Bowes** (United States) **S Collins**	2	**6**	**6**
5	(United States) K Adams (United States) P Barg	5	**6**	6
(West Germany) **A Betzner** (Austria) **J Wiesner**	**7**	2	**7**
(United States) R Casals (United States) J Russell	6	**7**	4
(Italy) **S Cecchini** (Socialist Federal Republic of Yugoslavia) **S Goleš**	**7**	5	**6**
(West Germany) **I Cueto** (Spain) **A Sánchez**	**6**	**6**
(South Africa) L Barnard (South Africa) M de Swardt	3	2

Second round
(Czechoslovakia) I Budařová (United States) J Kaplan	2	2
(United States) **K Horvath** (South Africa) **D Van Rensburg**	**6**	**6**
(United States) B Bowes (United States) S Collins	3	**6**	2
3	(United States) **Z Garrison** (West Germany) **E Pfaff**	**6**	4	**6**
(West Germany) A Betzner (Austria) J Wiesner	2	5
(Italy) **S Cecchini** (Socialist Federal Republic of Yugoslavia) **S Goleš**	**6**	**7**
(West Germany) I Cueto (Spain) A Sánchez	5	**6**	6
2	(United States) **L McNeil** (United States) **M Navratilova**	**7**	3	**7**

Quarterfinals
(United States) K Horvath (South Africa) D Van Rensburg	2	1
3	(United States) **Z Garrison** (West Germany) **E Pfaff**	**6**	**6**
(Italy) S Cecchini (Socialist Federal Republic of Yugoslavia) S Goleš	2	3
2	(United States) **L McNeil** (United States) **M Navratilova**	**6**	**6**

Semifinals
3	(United States) Z Garrison (West Germany) E Pfaff	3	4
2	(United States) **L McNeil** (United States) **M Navratilova**	**6**	**6**
