= 1988 Family Circle Cup =

- Date: April 4–10
- Edition: 16th
- Category: Category 5
- Draw: 56S / 28D
- Prize money: $300,000
- Surface: Clay / outdoor
- Location: Hilton Head Island, SC, U.S.
- Venue: Sea Pines Plantation

Champions

Singles
- (United States) Martina Navratilova

Doubles
- (United States) Lori McNeil / (United States) Martina Navratilova
← 1987 ·	Family Circle Cup	· 1989 →

The 1988 Family Circle Cup was a women's tennis tournament played on outdoor clay courts at the Sea Pines Plantation on Hilton Head Island, South Carolina in the United States and was part of the Category 5 tier of the 1988 WTA Tour. It was the 16th edition of the tournament and ran from April 4 through April 10, 1988. First-seeded Martina Navratilova won the singles title.

== Finals ==
=== Singles ===
(United States) Martina Navratilova defeated (Argentina) Gabriela Sabatini 6–1, 4–6, 6–4

- It was Navratilova's 4th singles title of the year and the 133rd of her career.

=== Doubles ===
(United States) Lori McNeil / (United States) Martina Navratilova defeated (West Germany) Claudia Kohde-Kilsch / (Argentina) Gabriela Sabatini 6–2, 2–6, 6–3

- It was McNeil's 3rd doubles title of the year and the 13th of her career. It was Navratilova's 4th doubles title of the year and the 139th of her career.
