= 1990 Family Circle Cup – Doubles =

Doubles
- 1990 Family Circle Cup

Final
- Champions: (United States) Martina Navratilova (Spain) Arantxa Sánchez Vicario
- Runners-up: (Argentina) Mercedes Paz (Soviet Union) Natasha Zvereva
- Score: 6–2, 6–1

Details
- Draw: 28
- Seeds: 8

Events
| Singles | Doubles |
- Family Circle Cup

The defending champions were Hana Mandlíková and Martina Navratilova, but Mandliková chose not to participate. Navratilova partnered Arantxa Sánchez Vicario and successfully defended her title, defeating Mercedes Paz and Natalia Zvereva in the final, 6–2, 6–1.

== Seeds ==
The top four seeds received a bye to the second round.

1. (United States) Martina Navratilova / (Spain) Arantxa Sánchez Vicario (champions)
2. (Argentina) Mercedes Paz / (Soviet Union) Natalia Zvereva (final)
3. (South Africa) Lise Gregory / (United States) Gretchen Rush (semifinal)
4. (United States) Mary Lou Daniels / (United States) Wendy White (semifinal)
5. (Soviet Union) Leila Meskhi / (Bulgaria) Katerina Maleeva (quarterfinal)
6. (Italy) Sandra Cecchini / (Argentina) Patricia Tarabini (second round)
7. (Czechoslovakia) Regina Rajchrtová / (Peru) Andrea Temesvári-Trunkos (quarterfinal)
8. (Peru) Laura Gildemeister / (West Germany) Claudia Kohde-Kilsch (second round)

== Draw ==
Key

- Q = Qualifier
- WC = Wild card
- LL = Lucky loser
- Alt = Alternate
- ITF = ITF entry
- PR = Protected ranking
- SR = Special ranking
- SE = Special exempt
- JE = Junior exempt
- JR = Junior Accelerator Programme entrant
- CO = College Accelerator Programme entrant
- NG = Next Gen Accelerator Program entrant
- w/o = Walkover
- r = Retired
- d = Defaulted

=== Finals ===
Semifinals
1 | (United States) Martina Navratilova (Spain) Arantxa Sánchez Vicario | 6 | 6
4 | (United States) Mary Lou Daniels (United States) Wendy White | 0 | 2
3 | (South Africa) Lise Gregory (United States) Gretchen Rush | 6 | 4
2 | (Argentina) Mercedes Paz (Soviet Union) Natasha Zvereva | 7 | 6

Final
1 | (United States) Martina Navratilova (Spain) Arantxa Sánchez Vicario | 6 | 6
2 | (Argentina) Mercedes Paz (Soviet Union) Natasha Zvereva | 2 | 1

=== Top half ===
First round
(United States) B Bowes (United States) H Cioffi | 4 | 6 | 4
(Denmark) S Albinus (France) N van Lottum | 6 | 0 | 6
(United States) C MacGregor (United States) C MacGregor | 3 | 6 | 2
(United States) S Collins (United States) J Smoller | 6 | 4 | 6
(United States) C Benjamin (South Africa) K Schimper | 2 | 5
5 | (United States) L Meskhi (Bulgaria) K Maleeva | 6 | 7
(United States) S Foltz (United States) J Thomas | 6 | 6
(Czechoslovakia) A Holikova (Czechoslovakia) R Maršíková | 4 | 1
(Poland) R Baranski (Argentina) B Fulco | 6 | 6
(Italy) L Garrone (Italy) B Romano | 4 | 1
(United States) K Foxworth (United States) T Whittington | 6 | 2
7 | (Czechoslovakia) R Rajchrtová (Hungary) A Temesvári-Trunkos | 7 | 6

Second round
1 | (United States) M Navratilova (Spain) A Sánchez Vicario | 6 | 6
(Denmark) S Albinus (France) N van Lottum | 1 | 1
(United States) S Collins (United States) J Smoller | 4 | 3
5 | (United States) L Meskhi (Bulgaria) K Maleeva | 6 | 6
4 | (United States) M Daniels (United States) W White | 6 | 6
(United States) S Foltz (United States) J Thomas | 2 | 0
(Poland) R Baranski (Argentina) B Fulco | 3 | 1
7 | (Czechoslovakia) R Rajchrtová (Hungary) A Temesvári-Trunkos | 6 | 6

Quarterfinals
1 | (United States) M Navratilova (Spain) A Sánchez Vicario | 6 | 6
5 | (United States) L Meskhi (Bulgaria) K Maleeva | 1 | 0
4 | (United States) M Daniels (United States) W White | 6 | 2 | 7
7 | (Czechoslovakia) R Rajchrtová (Hungary) A Temesvári-Trunkos | 2 | 6 | 5

Semifinals
1 | (United States) Martina Navratilova (Spain) Arantxa Sánchez Vicario | 6 | 6
4 | (United States) Mary Lou Daniels (United States) Wendy White | 0 | 2

=== Bottom half ===
First round
8 | (Peru) L Gildemeister (West Germany) C Kohde-Kilsch | 6 | 6
(Brazil) L Corsato-Owsianka (Brazil) A Vieira | 3 | 0
(Czechoslovakia) Budařová (Czechoslovakia) P Langrová | 6 | 3
(United States) L Spadea (Peru) P Vasquez | 7 | 6
(Socialist Federal Republic of Yugoslavia) S Goleš (Bulgaria) E Pampoulova | 2 | 6 | 6
(Italy) L Ferrando (Italy) S La Fratta | 6 | 0 | 3
6 | (Italy) S Cecchini (Argentina) P Tarabini | 4 | 6 | 6
(Switzerland) C Caverzasio (Italy) S Farina | 6 | 4 | 1
(United States) P Barg-Mager (United States) T Phelps | 6 | 6
(Argentina) G Castro (Spain) C Martínez | 3 | 3
(United States) D Faber (Canada) H Kelesi | 6 | 3 | 3
(United States) R Casals (United States) Z Garrison-Jackson | 4 | 6 | 6

Second round
8 | (Peru) L Gildemeister (West Germany) C Kohde-Kilsch | 4 | 6 | 2
(United States) L Spadea (Peru) P Vasquez | 6 | 4 | 6
(Socialist Federal Republic of Yugoslavia) S Goleš (Bulgaria) E Pampoulova | 1 | 3
3 | (South Africa) L Gregory (United States) G Rush | 6 | 6
6 | (Italy) S Cecchini (Argentina) P Tarabini | 6 | 3 | 3
(United States) P Barg-Mager (United States) T Phelps | 3 | 6 | 6
(United States) R Casals (United States) Z Garrison-Jackson | 4 | 1
2 | (Argentina) M Paz (Soviet Union) N Zvereva | 6 | 6

Quarterfinals
(United States) L Spadea (Peru) P Vasquez | 0 | 3
3 | (South Africa) L Gregory (United States) G Rush | 6 | 6
(United States) P Barg-Mager (United States) T Phelps | 4 | 7 | 2
2 | (Argentina) M Paz (Soviet Union) N Zvereva | 6 | 6 | 6

Semifinals
3 | (South Africa) Lise Gregory (United States) Gretchen Rush | 6 | 4
2 | (Argentina) Mercedes Paz (Soviet Union) Natalia Zvereva | 7 | 6
