= 2005 Family Circle Cup =

- Date: April 11–17
- Edition: 33rd
- Category: WTA Tier I
- Draw: 56S / 28D
- Surface: Clay / outdoor
- Location: Charleston, South Carolina, U.S.
- Venue: Family Circle Tennis Center
- Attendance: 92,350

Champions

Singles
- (Belgium) Justine Henin-Hardenne

Doubles
- (Spain) Conchita Martínez / (Spain) Virginia Ruano
← 2004 ·	Family Circle Cup	· 2006 →

The 2005 Family Circle Cup was the 33rd edition of the Family Circle Cup women's tennis tournament. This WTA Tier I Event was held at the Family Circle Tennis Center in Charleston, South Carolina, United States. Unseeded Justine Henin-Hardenne won the singles title.

== Finals ==
=== Singles ===
(Belgium) Justine Henin-Hardenne defeated (Russia) Elena Dementieva, 7–5, 6–4

=== Doubles ===
(Spain) Conchita Martínez / (Spain) Virginia Ruano Pascual defeated (Czech Republic) Iveta Benešová / (Czech Republic) Květa Peschke, 6–1, 6–4
