= 1990 Family Circle Cup – Singles =

Singles
- 1990 Family Circle Cup

Final
- Champion: (United States) Martina Navratilova
- Runner-up: (United States) Jennifer Capriati
- Score: 6–2, 6–4

Details
- Draw: 56 (8Q)
- Seeds: 16

Events
Singles	Doubles
- Family Circle Cup

Martina Navratilova defeated Jennifer Capriati in the final, 6–2, 6–4 to win the singles tennis title at the 1990 Family Circle Cup.

Steffi Graf was the reigning champion, but chose not to participate.

== Seeds ==
All seeds received a bye to the second round.

1. (United States) Martina Navratilova (champion)
2. (Spain) Arantxa Sánchez Vicario (third round)
3. (United States) Zina Garrison-Jackson (quarterfinal)
4. (Spain) Conchita Martínez (quarterfinal)
5. (Bulgaria) Katerina Maleeva (quarterfinal)
6. (Soviet Union) Natalia Zvereva (semifinal)
7. (Peru) Laura Gildemeister (third round)
8. (Canada) Helen Kelesi (quarterfinal)
9. (Italy) Sandra Cecchini (first round)
10. (United States) Gretchen Rush (third round)
11. (Soviet Union) Leila Meskhi (third round)
12. (West Germany) Isabel Cueto (third round)
13. (United States) Susan Sloane (first round)
14. (Argentina) Bettina Fulco (first round)
15. (Italy) Linda Ferrando (third round)
16. (Switzerland) Cathy Caverzasio (third round)

== Draw ==
Key

- Q = Qualifier
- WC = Wild card
- LL = Lucky loser
- Alt = Alternate
- ITF = ITF entry
- PR = Protected ranking
- SR = Special ranking
- SE = Special exempt
- JE = Junior exempt
- JR = Junior Accelerator Programme entrant
- CO = College Accelerator Programme entrant
- NG = Next Gen Accelerator Program entrant
- w/o = Walkover
- r = Retired
- d = Defaulted

=== Finals ===
Quarterfinals
1	(United States) Martina Navratilova	6	6
5	(Bulgaria) Katerina Maleeva	0	1
3	(United States) Zina Garrison-Jackson	6	3	1
(Czechoslovakia) Regina Rajchrtová	4	6	6
6	(Soviet Union) Natalia Zvereva	7	6
4	(Spain) Conchita Martínez	6	0
8	(Canada) Helen Kelesi	2	6	1
(United States) Jennifer Capriati	6	4	6

Semifinals
1	(United States) Martina Navratilova	6	6
(Czechoslovakia) Regina Rajchrtová	4	3
6	(Soviet Union) Natalia Zvereva	0	4
(United States) Jennifer Capriati	6	6

Final
1	(United States) Martina Navratilova	6	6
(United States) Jennifer Capriati	2	4

=== Top half ===
==== Section 1 ====
First round
(United States) H Cioffi	6	6
(United States) R Casals	3	4
(Italy) L Garrone	7	4	6
(Italy) B Romanò	5	6	2
(United States) T Phelps	2	3
12	(West Germany) I Cueto	6	6
9	(Italy) S Cecchini	3	1
(West Germany) C Kohde-Kilsch	6	6
(United States) W White	1	4
(Italy) L Lapi	6	6
Q	(Netherlands) H Ter Rier	0	1
(United States) L Harvey-Wild	6	6

Second round
1	(United States) M Navratilova	6	6
(United States) H Cioffi	2	1
(Italy) L Garrone	1	3
12	(West Germany) I Cueto	6	6
(West Germany) C Kohde-Kilsch	3	6
(Italy) L Lapi	6	7
(United States) L Harvey-Wild	1	2
5	(Bulgaria) K Maleeva	6	6

Third round
1	(United States) M Navratilova	6	6
12	(West Germany) I Cueto	3	2
(Italy) L Lapi	5	3
5	(Bulgaria) K Maleeva	7	6

Quarterfinals
1	(United States) Martina Navratilova	6	6
5	(Bulgaria) Katerina Maleeva	0	1

==== Section 2 ====
First round
LL	(United States) K Shin	6	2	2
(United States) B Bowes	4	6	6
(United States) S Collins	6	1	2
(United States) T Whitlinger	3	6	6
LL	(South Africa) K Schimper	4	1
15	(Italy) L Ferrando	6	6
14	(Argentina) B Fulco	1	0^{r}
(United States) A Keller	6	4
Q	(Soviet Union) E Brioukhovets	6	4	3
(Czechoslovakia) R Rajchrtová	2	6	6
Q	(United States) A Gooden	6	6
Q	(Peru) P Vásquez	4	3

Second round
3	(United States) Z Garrison-Jackson	6	6
(United States) B Bowes	2	2
(United States) T Whitlinger	2	1
15	(Italy) L Ferrando	6	6
(United States) A Keller	6	2	1
(Czechoslovakia) R Rajchrtová	4	6	6
Q	(United States) A Gooden	1	4
7	(Peru) L Gildemeister	6	6

Third round
3	(United States) Z Garrison-Jackson	6	4	7
15	(Italy) L Ferrando	1	6	5
(Czechoslovakia) R Rajchrtová	6	6
7	(Peru) L Gildemeister	4	2

Quarterfinals
3	(United States) Zina Garrison-Jackson	6	3	1
(Czechoslovakia) Regina Rajchrtová	4	6	6

=== Bottom half ===
==== Section 1 ====
First round
Q	(United States) E Rossides	1	6
(Argentina) P Tarabini	6	7
(Czechoslovakia) P Langrová	2	6	6
(United States) D Faber	6	4	1
Q	(Poland) R Baranski	6	2	0
11	(Soviet Union) L Meskhi	3	6	6
16	(Switzerland) C Caverzasio	6	6
(Czechoslovakia) Budařová	2	3
(United States) S Martin	6	6
(United States) J Santrock	4	3
(United States) C Benjamin	6	6
(Brazil) A Vieira	4	2

Second round
6	(Soviet Union) N Zvereva	6	6
(Argentina) P Tarabini	4	2
(Czechoslovakia) P Langrová	6	2	6
11	(Soviet Union) L Meskhi	4	6	7
16	(Switzerland) C Caverzasio	6	6
(United States) S Martin	1	2
(United States) C Benjamin	6	0
4	(Spain) C Martínez	7	6

Third round
6	(Soviet Union) N Zvereva	6	6
11	(Soviet Union) L Meskhi	2	1
16	(Switzerland) C Caverzasio	3	5
4	(Spain) C Martínez	6	7

Quarterfinals
6	(Soviet Union) Natalia Zvereva	7	6
4	(Spain) Conchita Martínez	6	0

==== Section 2 ====
First round
(Socialist Federal Republic of Yugoslavia) S Goleš	6	2	7
(Hungary) A Temesvári-Trunkos	2	6	5
Q	(West Germany) V Martinek	4	6	5
(Argentina) M Paz	6	3	7
(Bulgaria) E Pampoulova	3	3
10	(United States) G Rush	6	6
13	(United States) S Sloane	4	1
(United States) J Capriati	6	6
Q	(Brazil) L Corsato-Owsianka	2	4
(Greece) A Kanellopoulou	6	6
(United States) M Daniels	6	6
(United States) C MacGregor	3	4

Second round
8	(Canada) H Kelesi	6	6
(Socialist Federal Republic of Yugoslavia) S Goleš	2	2
(Argentina) M Paz	4	6	3
10	(United States) G Rush	6	4	6
(United States) J Capriati	6	6
(Greece) A Kanellopoulou	1	3
(United States) M Daniels	2	2
2	(Spain) A Sánchez Vicario	6	6

Third round
8	(Canada) H Kelesi	6	7
10	(United States) G Rush	1	6
(United States) J Capriati	6	6
2	(Spain) A Sánchez Vicario	1	1

Quarterfinals
8	(Canada) Helen Kelesi	2	6	1
(United States) Jennifer Capriati	6	4	6
