= 1986 Family Circle Cup =

- Date: April 7–13
- Edition: 14th
- Category: Category 4
- Draw: 56S / 32D
- Prize money: $200,000
- Surface: Clay / outdoor
- Location: Hilton Head Island, SC, U.S.
- Venue: Sea Pines Plantation

Champions

Singles
- (West Germany) Steffi Graf

Doubles
- (United States) Chris Evert-Lloyd / (United States) Anne White
← 1985 ·	Family Circle Cup	· 1987 →

The 1986 Family Circle Cup was a women's tennis tournament played on outdoor clay courts at the Sea Pines Plantation on Hilton Head Island, South Carolina in the United States and was part of the Category 4 tier of the 1986 WTA Tour. It was the 14th edition of the tournament and ran from April 7 through April 13, 1986. Third-seeded Steffi Graf won the singles title, the first WTA singles title of her career.

== Finals ==
=== Singles ===
(West Germany) Steffi Graf defeated (United States) Chris Evert-Lloyd 6–4, 7–5

- It was Graf's 1st singles title of her career.

=== Doubles ===
(United States) Chris Evert-Lloyd / (United States) Anne White defeated (West Germany) Steffi Graf / (France) Catherine Tanvier 6–3, 6–3

- It was Evert's 1st doubles title of the year and the 31st of her career. It was White's 1st doubles title of the year and the 5th of her career.
