= 1977 Family Circle Cup =

- Date: March 28 – April 3
- Edition: 5th
- Category: Colgate Series (AAA)
- Draw: 32S / 16D
- Prize money: $110,000
- Surface: Clay / outdoor
- Location: Hilton Head Island, U.S
- Venue: Sea Pines Plantation

Champions

Singles
- (United States) Chris Evert

Doubles
- (United States) Rosemary Casals / (United States) Chris Evert
← 1976 ·	Family Circle Cup	· 1978 →

The 1977 Family Circle Cup was a women's tennis tournament played on outdoor clay courts at the Sea Pines Plantation on Hilton Head Island, South Carolina in the United States. The event was part of the AAA (Note: Tournaments with prize money for the women of at least $100,000.) category of the 1977 Colgate Series. It was the fifth edition of the tournament and was held from March 28 through April 3, 1977. First-seeded Chris Evert won the singles title, her fourth consecutive title at the event, and earned $25,000 first-prize money.

== Finals ==
=== Singles ===
(United States) Chris Evert defeated (United States) Billie Jean King 6–0, 6–1

- It was Evert's 7th singles title of the year and the 74th of her career.

=== Doubles ===
(United States) Rosemary Casals / (United States) Chris Evert defeated (France) Françoise Dürr / (United Kingdom) Virginia Wade 1–6, 6–2, 6–3

== Prize money ==
Event	W	F	3rd	4th	QF	Round of 16	Round of 32
Singles	$25,000	$12,000	$6,600	$5,900	$2,700	$1,400	$750
