= 2005 Family Circle Cup – Singles =

Singles
- 2005 Family Circle Cup

Final
- Champion: (Belgium) Justine Henin-Hardenne
- Runner-up: (Russia) Elena Dementieva
- Score: 7–5, 6–4

Details
- Draw: 56
- Seeds: 16

Events
Singles	Doubles
- Family Circle Cup

Justine Henin-Hardenne defeated Elena Dementieva in the final, 7–5, 6–4 to win the singles tennis title at the 2005 Family Circle Cup.

Venus Williams was the defending champion, but lost in the third round to Tatiana Golovin.

== Seeds ==
The top eight seeds received a bye into the second round.

1. (United States) Lindsay Davenport (quarterfinals, retired due to a right hip flexor strain)
2. (Russia) Elena Dementieva (final)
3. (Russia) Anastasia Myskina (second round)
4. (United States) Venus Williams (third round)
5. (Australia) Alicia Molik (withdrew due to an inner ear infection)
6. (Russia) Vera Zvonareva (second round)
7. (Russia) Nadia Petrova (quarterfinals)
8. (Switzerland) Patty Schnyder (semifinals)
9. (Russia) Elena Likhovtseva (first round)
10. (Serbia and Montenegro) Jelena Janković (first round)
11. (Japan) Ai Sugiyama (third round)
12. (Italy) Silvia Farina Elia (first round)
13. (France) Tatiana Golovin (semifinals)
14. (Japan) Shinobu Asagoe (third round)
15. (France) Mary Pierce (second round)
16. (Colombia) Fabiola Zuluaga (second round)

== Draw ==
Key

- Q = Qualifier
- WC = Wild card
- LL = Lucky loser
- Alt = Alternate
- ITF = ITF entry
- PR = Protected ranking
- SR = Special ranking
- SE = Special exempt
- JE = Junior exempt
- JR = Junior Accelerator Programme entrant
- CO = College Accelerator Programme entrant
- NG = Next Gen Accelerator Program entrant
- w/o = Walkover
- r = Retired
- d = Defaulted

=== Finals ===
Quarterfinals
1	(United States) Lindsay Davenport	6	3	0^{r}
(Belgium) Justine Henin-Hardenne	3	6	1
13	(France) Tatiana Golovin	7	6
7	(Russia) Nadia Petrova	5	3
8	(Switzerland) Patty Schnyder	6	6
(Czech Republic) Nicole Vaidišová	3	2
(Slovenia) Katarina Srebotnik	3	7	4
2	(Russia) Elena Dementieva	6	5	6

Semifinals
(Belgium) Justine Henin-Hardenne	7^{7}	7
13	(France) Tatiana Golovin	6^{4}	5
8	(Switzerland) Patty Schnyder	6	4	0
2	(Russia) Elena Dementieva	3	6	6

Final
(Belgium) Justine Henin-Hardenne	7	6
2	(Russia) Elena Dementieva	5	4

=== Top half ===
==== Section 1 ====
First round
WC	(United States) J Craybas	7	4	2
Q	(Canada) M-È Pelletier	5	6	6
Q	(Puerto Rico) K Brandi	6	0	1
Q	(Ukraine) V Kutuzova	1	6	6
Q	(France) S Beltrame	3	4
16	(Colombia) F Zuluaga	6	6
10	(Serbia and Montenegro) J Janković	7	4	3
(Belgium) J Henin-Hardenne	5	6	6
(China) S Peng	6	6
(United States) M Irvin	2	4
(Czech Republic) I Benešová	1	6	6
Q	(Russia) G Voskoboeva	6	3	1

Second round
1	(United States) L Davenport	6	6
Q	(Canada) M-È Pelletier	2	2
Q	(Ukraine) V Kutuzova	6	6
16	(Colombia) F Zuluaga	3	1
(Belgium) J Henin-Hardenne	6	4	6
(China) S Peng	2	6	4
(Czech Republic) I Benešová	6	4	7
6	(Russia) V Zvonareva	4	6	5

Third round
1	(United States) L Davenport	6	6
Q	(Ukraine) V Kutuzova	3	1
(Belgium) J Henin-Hardenne	6	6
(Czech Republic) I Benešová	2	3

Quarterfinals
1	(United States) L Davenport	6	3	0^{r}
(Belgium) J Henin-Hardenne	3	6	1

==== Section 2 ====
First round
(Czech Republic) D Chládková	6	3	7
(Italy) ME Camerin	2	6	5
(France) V Razzano	3	0
(United States) L Raymond	6	6
(United States) A Frazier	3	3
13	(France) T Golovin	6	6
12	(Italy) S Farina Elia	4	6^{6}
(Croatia) J Kostanić	6	7^{8}
(Czech Republic) B Strýcová	6	6
(Spain) C Martínez	3	4
(Japan) A Morigami	6	6
(Italy) T Garbin	1	2

Second round
4	(United States) V Williams	7^{7}	6
(Czech Republic) D Chládková	6^{1}	2
(United States) L Raymond	4	3
13	(France) T Golovin	6	6
(Croatia) J Kostanić	6	6
(Czech Republic) B Strýcová	3	2
(Japan) A Morigami	4	0
7	(Russia) N Petrova	6	6

Third round
4	(United States) V Williams	5	4
13	(France) T Golovin	7	6
(Croatia) J Kostanić	3	3
7	(Russia) N Petrova	6	6

Quarterfinals
13	(France) T Golovin	7	6
7	(Russia) N Petrova	5	3

=== Bottom half ===
==== Section 3 ====
First round
(Spain) M Marrero	7^{9}	6
(Spain) A Medina Garrigues	6^{7}	0
(Australia) S Stosur	6	6
(Spain) V Ruano Pascual	2	3
(Czech Republic) K Koukalová	6	6
9	(Russia) E Likhovtseva	3	4
14	(Japan) S Asagoe	6^{5}	6	6
Q	(United States) L Lee-Waters	7^{7}	0	2
WC	(Greece) E Daniilidou	4	0
(United States) M Shaughnessy	6	6
Q	(Israel) S Pe'er	6	6^{8}	2
(Czech Republic) N Vaidišová	4	7^{10}	6

Second round
8	(Switzerland) P Schnyder	6	7
(Spain) M Marrero	2	5
(Australia) S Stosur	3	3
(Czech Republic) K Koukalová	6	6
14	(Japan) S Asagoe	w/o
(United States) M Shaughnessy
(Czech Republic) N Vaidišová	6	5	6
3	(Russia) A Myskina	3	7	4

Third round
8	(Switzerland) P Schnyder	6	6
(Czech Republic) K Koukalová	4	0
14	(Japan) S Asagoe	6	4	6^{2}
(Czech Republic) N Vaidišová	3	6	7^{7}

Quarterfinals
8	(Switzerland) P Schnyder	6	6
(Czech Republic) N Vaidišová	3	2

==== Section 4 ====
First round
WC	(Australia) N Pratt	5	1
(Slovenia) K Srebotnik	7	6
WC	(United States) C Gullickson	3	3
(Germany) A-L Grönefeld	6	6
Q	(Ukraine) Y Fedak	3	6	4
11	(Japan) A Sugiyama	6	4	6
15	(France) M Pierce	6	6
(United States) M Washington	3	2
(Spain) N Llagostera Vives	6	1	6
(Slovakia) M Suchá	4	6	2
(Madagascar) D Randriantefy	4	6	2
(Russia) A Jidkova	6	4	6

Second round
LL	(Ukraine) T Perebiynis	6	3	1
(Slovenia) K Srebotnik	2	6	6
(Germany) A-L Grönefeld	2	4
11	(Japan) A Sugiyama	6	6
15	(France) M Pierce	4	6^{3}
(Spain) N Llagostera Vives	6	7^{7}
(Russia) A Jidkova	4	4
2	(Russia) E Dementieva	6	6

Third round
(Slovenia) K Srebotnik	6	4	6
11	(Japan) A Sugiyama	1	6	1
(Spain) N Llagostera Vives	0	3
2	(Russia) E Dementieva	6	6

Quarterfinals
(Slovenia) K Srebotnik	3	7	4
2	(Russia) E Dementieva	6	5	6
