= 2026 Credit One Charleston Open =

- Date: March 30 – April 5
- Edition: 54th
- Category: WTA 500
- Draw: 48S / 16D
- Prize money: $2,300,000
- Surface: Green clay / outdoor
- Location: Charleston, South Carolina, United States
- Venue: LTP-Daniel Island

Champions

Singles
- (United States) Jessica Pegula

Doubles
- (United States) Desirae Krawczyk / (United States) Caty McNally
- Charleston Open

The 2026 Charleston Open (branded as the Credit One Charleston Open for sponsorship reasons) was a professional women's tennis tournament played on outdoor green clay courts at the LTP Daniel Island Tennis Center on Daniel Island in Charleston, South Carolina. It was the 54th edition of the tournament and a WTA 500 tournament on the 2026 WTA Tour. It took place from March 30 to April 5, 2026, and was the only event of the clay court season played on green clay.

== Champions ==
=== Singles ===
- (United States) Jessica Pegula def. (Ukraine) Yuliia Starodubtseva 6–2, 6–2

=== Doubles ===
- (United States) Desirae Krawczyk / (United States) Caty McNally def. (Hungary) Anna Bondár / (Poland) Magdalena Fręch, 6–3, 6–2

== Singles main draw entrants ==
=== Seeds ===
Country	Player	Rank^{1}	Seed
USA	Jessica Pegula	5	1
	~~Ekaterina Alexandrova~~	~~11~~	~~2~~
SUI	Belinda Bencic	12	3
USA	Iva Jovic	17	4
USA	Madison Keys	18	5
~~BEL~~	~~Elise Mertens~~	~~19~~	~~6~~
	Diana Shnaider	20	7
	Anna Kalinskaya	21	8
CAN	Leylah Fernandez	25	9
GRE	Maria Sakkari	33	10
POL	Magdalena Fręch	37	11
INA	Janice Tjen	40	12
CZE	Sára Bejlek	41	13
ITA	Elisabetta Cocciaretto	44	14
USA	Hailey Baptiste	45	15
USA	Sofia Kenin	46	16
USA	Peyton Stearns	47	17

- ^{1} Rankings as of March 16, 2026.

=== Other entrants ===
The following players received wildcards into the main draw:

- (Canada) Bianca Andreescu
- (Spain) Paula Badosa
- (United States) Jennifer Brady
- (United States) Sloane Stephens

The following players received entry from the qualifying draw:

- (United States) Kayla Day
- (Uzbekistan) Polina Kudermetova
- (United States) Mary Stoiana
- (Bulgaria) Viktoriya Tomova
- (United States) Akasha Urhobo
- (Croatia) Donna Vekić

The following players received entry as lucky losers:

- (Georgia (country)) Ekaterine Gorgodze
- (United States) Elvina Kalieva
- (Czech Republic) Darja Vidmanova
- (China) Yuan Yue

=== Withdrawals ===
- Ekaterina Alexandrova → replaced by (Georgia (country)) Ekaterine Gorgodze
- (United States) Amanda Anisimova → replaced by (Ukraine) Yuliia Starodubtseva
- (Spain) Cristina Bucșa → replaced by Anastasia Zakharova
- (France) Varvara Gracheva → replaced by (New Zealand) Lulu Sun
- (Brazil) Beatriz Haddad Maia → replaced by (Australia) Ajla Tomljanović
- (Australia) Maya Joint → replaced by (Czech Republic) Darja Vidmanova
- (Australia) Daria Kasatkina → replaced by (Hungary) Dalma Gálfi
- (Poland) Magda Linette → replaced by (United States) Elvina Kalieva
- (Belgium) Elise Mertens → replaced by (China) Yuan Yue
- (United States) Emma Navarro → replaced by (United States) Alycia Parks
- (Latvia) Jeļena Ostapenko → replaced by (Mexico) Renata Zarazúa
- (China) Wang Xinyu → replaced by (United States) Katie Volynets

== Doubles main draw entrants ==
=== Seeds ===
Country	Player	Country	Player	Rank^{1}	Seed
SRB	Aleksandra Krunić	CHN	Zhang Shuai	22	1
USA	Nicole Melichar-Martinez		Alexandra Panova	43	2
TPE	Chan Hao-ching	TPE	Wu Fang-hsien	76	3
JPN	Miyu Kato	MEX	Giuliana Olmos	88	4

- Rankings are as of March 16, 2026.

=== Other entrants ===
The following pairs received entry using a protected ranking:

- (United States) Jennifer Brady / (New Zealand) Erin Routliffe
- (Chile) Alexa Guarachi / (United States) Sofia Kenin
