= 1980 Family Circle Cup =

Women's tennis tournament

- Date: April 7–13
- Edition: 8th
- Category: Colgate Series (AAA)
- Draw: 64S / 32D
- Prize money: $150,000
- Surface: Clay / outdoor
- Location: Hilton Head Island, U.S
- Venue: Sea Pines Plantation

Champions

Singles
- (United States) Tracy Austin

Doubles
- (United States) Kathy Jordan / (United States) Anne Smith
← 1979 ·	Family Circle Cup	· 1981 →

The 1980 Family Circle Cup was a women's tennis tournament played on outdoor clay courts at the Sea Pines Plantation on Hilton Head Island, South Carolina in the United States. The event was part of the AAA (Note: Tournaments with prize money for the women of at least $125,000.) category of the 1980 Colgate Series. It was the eighth edition of the tournament and was held from April 7 through April 13, 1980. First-seeded and defending champion Tracy Austin won the singles title and earned $30,000 first-prize money.

== Finals ==
=== Singles ===
(United States) Tracy Austin defeated (Czechoslovakia) Regina Maršíková 3–6, 6–1, 6–0

- It was Austin's 6th title of the year and the 16th of her career.

=== Doubles ===
(United States) Kathy Jordan / (United States) Anne Smith defeated (United States) Candy Reynolds / (United States) Paula Smith 6–1, 6–1

== Prize money and ranking points ==
Event		W	F	3rd	4th	QF	Round of 16	Round of 32	Round of 64
Singles	Prize money	$30,000	$15,000	$7,600	$7,200	$3,250	$1,600	$800	$350
Singles	Ranking points	125	95	70	70	40	25	15	5
