= 1979 Family Circle Cup =

- Date: April 10–15
- Edition: 7th
- Category: Colgate Series (AAAA)
- Draw: 32S/16D
- Prize money: $150,000
- Surface: Clay / outdoor
- Location: Hilton Head Island, U.S
- Venue: Sea Pines Plantation

Champions

Singles
- (United States) Tracy Austin

Doubles
- (United States) Rosie Casals / (United States) Martina Navratilova
| ← 1978 · | Family Circle Cup | · 1980 → |

The 1979 Family Circle Cup was a women's tennis tournament played on outdoor clay courts at the Sea Pines Plantation on Hilton Head Island, South Carolina in the United States. The event was part of the AAAA (Note: Tournaments with prize money for the women of at least $150,000.) category of the 1979 Colgate Series. It was the seventh edition of the tournament and was held from April 10 through April 15, 1979. Second-seeded Tracy Austin won the singles title and earned $30,000 first-prize money.

== Finals ==
=== Singles ===
(United States) Tracy Austin defeated (Australia) Kerry Reid 7–6^{(7–3)}, 7–6^{(9–7)}

- It was Austin's 2nd title of the year and the 5th of her career.

=== Doubles ===
(United States) Rosie Casals / (United States) Martina Navratilova defeated (France) Françoise Dürr / (Netherlands) Betty Stöve 6–4, 7–5

== Prize money ==
| Event | W | F | 3rd | 4th | QF | Round of 16 | Round of 32 |
| Singles | $26,000 | $15,000 | $7,600 | $7,200 | $3,250 | $1,600 | $825 |
