= 1989 Family Circle Cup =

- Date: April 3–9
- Edition: 17th
- Category: Category 5
- Draw: 56S / 28D
- Prize money: $300,000
- Surface: Clay / outdoor
- Location: Hilton Head Island, SC, U.S.
- Venue: Sea Pines Plantation

Champions

Singles
- (West Germany) Steffi Graf

Doubles
- (Australia) Hana Mandlíková (United States) Martina Navratilova
← 1988 ·	Family Circle Cup	· 1990 →

The 1989 Family Circle Cup was a women's tennis tournament played on outdoor clay courts at the Sea Pines Plantation on Hilton Head Island, South Carolina in the United States and was part of the Category 5 tier of the 1989 WTA Tour. It was the 17th edition of the tournament and ran from April 3 through April 9, 1989. First-seeded Steffi Graf won the singles title, her third at the event.

== Finals ==
=== Singles ===
(West Germany) Steffi Graf defeated (Soviet Union) Natasha Zvereva 6–1, 6–1

- It was Graf's 5th title of the year and the 35th of her career.

=== Doubles ===
(Australia) Hana Mandlíková / (United States) Martina Navratilova defeated (United States) Mary Lou Daniels / (United States) Wendy White 6–4, 6–1

- It was Mandlíková's 2nd title of the year and the 30th of her career. It was Navratilova's 5th title of the year and the 286th of her career.
