= 2005 Family Circle Cup – Doubles =

Doubles
- 2005 Family Circle Cup

Final
- Champions: (Spain) Conchita Martínez (Spain) Virginia Ruano Pascual
- Runners-up: (Czech Republic) Iveta Benešová (Czech Republic) Květa Peschke
- Score: 6–1, 6–4

Details
- Draw: 28
- Seeds: 8

Events
Singles	Doubles
- Family Circle Cup

Virginia Ruano Pascual and Paola Suárez were the defending champions, but had different outcomes. While Suárez did not compete this year, Ruano Pascual teamed up with Conchita Martínez and successfully defended her title, by defeating Iveta Benešová and Květa Peschke 6–1, 6–4 in the final.

It was the 12th doubles title for Martínez and the 32rd doubles title for Ruano Pascual, in their respective careers.

== Seeds ==
The first four seeds received a bye into the second round.

1. (United States) Lisa Raymond / (Australia) Rennae Stubbs (semifinals)
2. (Spain) Conchita Martínez / (Spain) Virginia Ruano Pascual (champions)
3. (Russia) Elena Likhovtseva / (Japan) Ai Sugiyama (second round)
4. (Germany) Anna-Lena Grönefeld / (United States) Martina Navratilova (second round)
5. (Australia) Bryanne Stewart / (Australia) Samantha Stosur (quarterfinals)
6. (Japan) Shinobu Asagoe / (Slovenia) Katarina Srebotnik (quarterfinals)
7. (Greece) Eleni Daniilidou / (Australia) Nicole Pratt (first round)
8. (United States) Corina Morariu / (France) Mary Pierce (quarterfinals)

== Draw ==
Key

- Q = Qualifier
- WC = Wild card
- LL = Lucky loser
- Alt = Alternate
- ITF = ITF entry
- PR = Protected ranking
- SR = Special ranking
- SE = Special exempt
- JE = Junior exempt
- JR = Junior Accelerator Programme entrant
- CO = College Accelerator Programme entrant
- NG = Next Gen Accelerator Program entrant
- w/o = Walkover
- r = Retired
- d = Defaulted

=== Finals ===
Semifinals
1	(United States) Lisa Raymond (Australia) Rennae Stubbs	6	4	1
(Czech Republic) Iveta Benešová (Czech Republic) Květa Peschke	0	6	6
(Spain) Lourdes Domínguez Lino (Spain) Anabel Medina Garrigues	1	2
2	(Spain) Conchita Martínez (Spain) Virginia Ruano Pascual	6	6

Final
(Czech Republic) Iveta Benešová (Czech Republic) Květa Peschke	1	4
2	(Spain) Conchita Martínez (Spain) Virginia Ruano Pascual	6	6

=== Top half ===
First round
(Italy) ME Camerin (Italy) T Garbin	6	4	6
(Czech Republic) D Chládková (Romania) R Dragomir Ilie	4	6	4
(Serbia and Montenegro) J Janković (Croatia) J Kostanić	6	6
WC	(Puerto Rico) K Brandi (South Africa) K Grant	0	4
(France) T Golovin (Russia) V Zvonareva	2	2
6	(Japan) S Asagoe (Slovenia) K Srebotnik	6	6
(United States) A Cargill (United States) L Granville	5	2
(Czech Republic) I Benešová (Czech Republic) K Peschke	7	6
(United States) J Craybas (United States) J Russell	7^{7}	7
(Latvia) L Dekmeijere (Japan) N Miyagi	6^{4}	5
(United States) J Hopkins (United States) M Washington	7^{8}	6
7	(Greece) E Daniilidou (Australia) N Pratt	6^{6}	2

Second round
1	(United States) L Raymond (Australia) R Stubbs	6	6
(Italy) ME Camerin (Italy) T Garbin	2	0
(Serbia and Montenegro) J Janković (Croatia) J Kostanić	3	3
6	(Japan) S Asagoe (Slovenia) K Srebotnik	6	6
4	(Germany) A-L Grönefeld (United States) M Navratilova	5	7	6^{5}
(Czech Republic) I Benešová (Czech Republic) K Peschke	7	5	7^{7}
(United States) J Craybas (United States) J Russell	3	4
(United States) J Hopkins (United States) M Washington	6	6

Quarterfinals
1	(United States) L Raymond (Australia) R Stubbs	6	7^{7}
6	(Japan) S Asagoe (Slovenia) K Srebotnik	3	6^{4}
(Czech Republic) I Benešová (Czech Republic) K Peschke	6	7
(United States) J Hopkins (United States) M Washington	2	5

Semifinals
1	(United States) L Raymond (Australia) R Stubbs	6	4	1
(Czech Republic) I Benešová (Czech Republic) K Peschke	0	6	6

=== Bottom half ===
First round
5	(Australia) B Stewart (Australia) S Stosur	6	6
(Chinese Taipei) J Lee (China) S Peng	4	2
(Russia) A Jidkova (Ukraine) T Perebiynis	4	7^{12}	6
(Ukraine) Y Fedak (United States) L Osterloh	6	6^{10}	4
(Spain) L Domínguez Lino (Spain) A Medina Garrigues	6	6^{4}	6
(Australia) L McShea (United States) A Spears	2	7^{7}	1
8	(United States) C Morariu (France) M Pierce	6	6
WC	(Ukraine) V Kutuzova (Czech Republic) N Vaidišová	3	4
Q	(Czech Republic) B Strýcová (Russia) G Voskoboeva	3	6	6
(Canada) M Drake (United States) L Lee-Waters	6	2	4
(Belgium) E Callens (United States) M Tu	6	6
(Spain) N Llagostera Vives (Spain) M Marrero	3	2

Second round
5	(Australia) B Stewart (Australia) S Stosur	7	6
(Russia) A Jidkova (Ukraine) T Perebiynis	5	3
(Spain) L Domínguez Lino (Spain) A Medina Garrigues	7^{10}	3	6
3	(Russia) E Likhovtseva (Japan) A Sugiyama	6^{8}	6	1
8	(United States) C Morariu (France) M Pierce	6	3	6
Q	(Czech Republic) B Strýcová (Russia) G Voskoboeva	0	6	2
(Belgium) E Callens (United States) M Tu	4	3
2	(Spain) C Martínez (Spain) V Ruano Pascual	6	6

Quarterfinals
5	(Australia) B Stewart (Australia) S Stosur	6	2	4
(Spain) L Domínguez Lino (Spain) A Medina Garrigues	4	6	6
8	(United States) C Morariu (France) M Pierce	2	7^{7}	2
2	(Spain) C Martínez (Spain) V Ruano Pascual	6	6^{5}	6

Semifinals
(Spain) L Domínguez Lino (Spain) A Medina Garrigues	1	2
2	(Spain) C Martínez (Spain) V Ruano Pascual	6	6
