= 2026 Credit One Charleston Open – Doubles =

Doubles
- 2026 Credit One Charleston Open

Final
- Champions: (United States) Desirae Krawczyk (United States) Caty McNally
- Runners-up: (Hungary) Anna Bondár (Poland) Magdalena Fręch
- Score: 6–3, 6–2

Details
- Draw: 16
- Seeds: 4

Events
Singles	Doubles
- Charleston Open

Desirae Krawczyk and Caty McNally defeated Anna Bondár and Magdalena Fręch in the final, 6–3, 6–2 to win the doubles tennis title at the 2026 Charleston Open.

Jeļena Ostapenko and Erin Routliffe were the reigning champions, but Ostapenko did not participate this year. Routliffe partnered Jennifer Brady, but lost in the quarterfinals to Miyu Kato and Giuliana Olmos.

== Seeds ==
1. (Serbia) Aleksandra Krunić / (China) Zhang Shuai (quarterfinals)
2. (United States) Nicole Melichar-Martinez / Alexandra Panova (quarterfinals)
3. (Chinese Taipei) Chan Hao-ching / (Chinese Taipei) Wu Fang-hsien (first round)
4. (Japan) Miyu Kato / (Mexico) Giuliana Olmos (semifinals)

== Draw ==
Key

- Q = Qualifier
- WC = Wild card
- LL = Lucky loser
- Alt = Alternate
- ITF = ITF entry
- PR = Protected ranking
- SR = Special ranking
- SE = Special exempt
- JE = Junior exempt
- JR = Junior Accelerator Programme entrant
- CO = College Accelerator Programme entrant
- NG = Next Gen Accelerator Program entrant
- w/o = Walkover
- r = Retired
- d = Defaulted

=== Draw ===
First round
1	(Serbia) A Krunić (China) S Zhang	7^{7}	7
(Indonesia) A Sutjiadi (Indonesia) J Tjen	6^{3}	5
(United States) D Krawczyk (United States) C McNally	7^{7}	6
PR	(Chile) A Guarachi (United States) S Kenin	6^{3}	3
3	(Chinese Taipei) H-c Chan (Chinese Taipei) F-h Wu	3	2
(Italy) E Cocciaretto (Kazakhstan) Y Putintseva	6	6
(Georgia (country)) E Gorgodze (Mexico) R Zarazúa	6	6
(United States) S Santamaria (United States) P Stearns	2	3
PR	(United States) J Brady (New Zealand) E Routliffe	6	7^{7}
(United States) A Muhammad (United States) J Pegula	4	6^{4}
(United States) A Akli (United States) I Corley	2	2
4	(Japan) M Kato (Mexico) G Olmos	6	6
(Canada) L Fernandez (France) K Mladenovic	6^{2}	6	[9]
(Hungary) A Bondár (Poland) M Fręch	7^{7}	2	[11]
(Norway) U Eikeri (United States) Q Gleason	1	6	[4]
2	(United States) N Melichar-Martinez; A Panova	6	1	[10]

Quarterfinals
1	(Serbia) A Krunić (China) S Zhang	1	5
(United States) D Krawczyk (United States) C McNally	6	7
(Italy) E Cocciaretto (Kazakhstan) Y Putintseva	3	7	[10]
(Georgia (country)) E Gorgodze (Mexico) R Zarazúa	6	5	[7]
PR	(United States) J Brady (New Zealand) E Routliffe	3	1
4	(Japan) M Kato (Mexico) G Olmos	6	6
(Hungary) A Bondár (Poland) M Fręch	2	7	[10]
2	(United States) N Melichar-Martinez; A Panova	6	5	[2]

Semifinals
(United States) D Krawczyk (United States) C McNally	w/o
(Italy) E Cocciaretto (Kazakhstan) Y Putintseva
4	(Japan) M Kato (Mexico) G Olmos	1	4
(Hungary) A Bondár (Poland) M Fręch	6	6

Final
(United States) D Krawczyk (United States) C McNally	6	6
(Hungary) A Bondár (Poland) M Fręch	3	2
