= 1975 Family Circle Cup =

- Date: April 21–27
- Edition: 3rd
- Category: WTA Tour
- Draw: 32S / 16D
- Prize money: $100,000
- Surface: Clay / outdoor
- Location: Amelia Island, Florida, U.S.
- Venue: Amelia Island Plantation

Champions

Singles
- (United States) Chris Evert

Doubles
- (Australia) Evonne Goolagong / (United Kingdom) Virginia Wade
← 1974 ·	Family Circle Cup	· 1976 →

The 1975 Family Circle Cup was a women's tennis tournament played on outdoor clay courts at the Amelia Island Plantation in Amelia Island, Florida in the United States. The event was part of the 1975 WTA Tour. It was the third edition of the tournament and was held from April 21 through April 27, 1975. First-seeded Chris Evert won the singles title, her second consecutive title at the event, and earned $25,000 first-prize money.

== Finals ==
=== Singles ===
(United States) Chris Evert defeated (Czechoslovakia) Martina Navratilova 7–5, 6–4

- It was Evert's 6th singles title of the year and the 45th of her career.

=== Doubles ===
(Australia) Evonne Goolagong / (United Kingdom) Virginia Wade defeated (United States) Rosemary Casals / (Soviet Union) Olga Morozova 4–6, 6–4, 6–2

== See also ==
- Evert–Navratilova rivalry
