= 2026 Credit One Charleston Open – Singles =

Singles
- 2026 Credit One Charleston Open

Final
- Champion: (United States) Jessica Pegula
- Runner-up: (Ukraine) Yuliia Starodubtseva
- Score: 6–2, 6–2

Details
- Draw: 48
- Seeds: 16

Events
| Singles | Doubles |
- Charleston Open

Defending champion Jessica Pegula defeated Yuliia Starodubtseva in the final, 6–2, 6–2 to win the singles tennis title at the 2026 Charleston Open. It was her eleventh WTA Tour title. Pegula was the first player to defend the title since Serena Williams in 2013.

== Seeds ==
All seeds received a bye into the second round.

1. (United States) Jessica Pegula (champion)
2. Ekaterina Alexandrova (withdrew)
3. (Switzerland) Belinda Bencic (quarterfinals)
4. (United States) Iva Jovic (semifinals)
5. (United States) Madison Keys (semifinals)
6. (Belgium) Elise Mertens (withdrew)
7. Diana Shnaider (quarterfinals)
8. Anna Kalinskaya (quarterfinals)
9. (Canada) Leylah Fernandez (third round)
10. (Greece) Maria Sakkari (second round)
11. (Poland) Magdalena Fręch (second round)
12. (Indonesia) Janice Tjen (second round)
13. (Czech Republic) Sára Bejlek (third round)
14. (Italy) Elisabetta Cocciaretto (third round)
15. (United States) Hailey Baptiste (second round)
16. (United States) Sofia Kenin (third round)
17. (United States) Peyton Stearns (third round)

Click on the seed number of a player to go to their draw section.

== Draw ==
Key

- Q = Qualifier
- WC = Wild card
- LL = Lucky loser
- Alt = Alternate
- ITF = ITF entry
- PR = Protected ranking
- SR = Special ranking
- SE = Special exempt
- JE = Junior exempt
- JR = Junior Accelerator Programme entrant
- CO = College Accelerator Programme entrant
- NG = Next Gen Accelerator Program entrant
- w/o = Walkover
- r = Retired
- d = Defaulted

=== Finals ===
Quarterfinals
1 | (United States) Jessica Pegula | 3 | 6 | 6
7 | Diana Shnaider | 6 | 3 | 2
4 | (United States) Iva Jovic | 6 | 6
8 | Anna Kalinskaya | 3 | 4
5 | (United States) Madison Keys | 4 | 6 | 6
3 | (Switzerland) Belinda Bencic | 6 | 3 | 2
(United States) McCartney Kessler | 4 | 4
(Ukraine) Yuliia Starodubtseva | 6 | 6

Semifinals
1 | (United States) Jessica Pegula | 6 | 5 | 6
4 | (United States) Iva Jovic | 4 | 7 | 3
5 | (United States) Madison Keys | 1 | 4
(Ukraine) Yuliia Starodubtseva | 6 | 6

Final
1 | (United States) Jessica Pegula | 6 | 6
(Ukraine) Yuliia Starodubtseva | 2 | 2

=== Top half ===
==== Section 1 ====
First round
(Kazakhstan) Y Putintseva | 7^{8} | 6
(New Zealand) L Sun | 6^{6} | 2
(Egypt) M Sherif | 6 | 6^{4} | 6^{5}
LL | (China) Y Yuan | 2 | 7^{7} | 7^{7}
Q | (Uzbekistan) P Kudermetova | 3 | 7^{7} | 6
(Ukraine) O Oliynykova | 6 | 6^{1} | 4
(Germany) E Lys | 7 | 2 | 0
(United States) K Volynets | 5 | 6 | 6

Second round
1 | (United States) J Pegula | 4 | 6 | 7
(Kazakhstan) Y Putintseva | 6 | 4 | 5
LL | (China) Y Yuan | 0 | 5
14 | (Italy) E Cocciaretto | 6 | 7
9 | (Canada) L Fernandez | 6 | 6
Q | (Uzbekistan) P Kudermetova | 2 | 1
(United States) K Volynets | 5 | 5
7 | D Shnaider | 7 | 7

Third round
1 | (United States) J Pegula | 1 | 6 | 7^{7}
14 | (Italy) E Cocciaretto | 6 | 1 | 6^{1}
9 | (Canada) L Fernandez | 3 | 0
7 | D Shnaider | 6 | 6

Quarterfinals
1 | (United States) J Pegula | 3 | 6 | 6
7 | D Shnaider | 6 | 3 | 2

==== Section 2 ====
First round
(United States) A Parks | 2 | 6 | 6
Q | (United States) M Stoiana | 6 | 4 | 1
WC | (Canada) B Andreescu | 1 | 6 | 6
(Hungary) D Gálfi | 6 | 4 | 1
Q | (United States) K Day | 4 | 3
WC | (Spain) P Badosa | 6 | 6
Q | (Bulgaria) V Tomova | 6 | 6
WC | (United States) J Brady | 4 | 3

Second round
4 | (United States) I Jovic | 6 | 6
(United States) A Parks | 3 | 2
WC | (Canada) B Andreescu | 4 | 4
16 | (United States) S Kenin | 6 | 6
10 | (Greece) M Sakkari | 3 | 4
WC | (Spain) P Badosa | 6 | 6
Q | (Bulgaria) V Tomova | 2 | 4
8 | A Kalinskaya | 6 | 6

Third round
4 | (United States) I Jovic | 7 | 7
16 | (United States) S Kenin | 5 | 5
WC | (Spain) P Badosa | 4 | 2
8 | A Kalinskaya | 6 | 6

Quarterfinals
4 | (United States) I Jovic | 6 | 6
8 | A Kalinskaya | 3 | 4

=== Bottom half ===
==== Section 3 ====
First round
(Australia) A Tomljanović | 6 | 1 | 4
Q | (Croatia) D Vekić | 3 | 6 | 6
LL | (Czech Republic) D Vidmanová | 5 | 5
(Hungary) A Bondár | 7 | 7
(Argentina) S Sierra | 5 | 0^{r}
Q | (United States) A Urhobo | 7 | 3
A Zakharova | 5 | 2
(Ukraine) D Yastremska | 7 | 6

Second round
5 | (United States) M Keys | 6 | 6
Q | (Croatia) D Vekić | 2 | 3
(Hungary) A Bondár | 7 | 6
11 | (Poland) M Fręch | 5 | 3
13 | (Czech Republic) S Bejlek | 6 | 6
Q | (United States) A Urhobo | 1 | 1
(Ukraine) D Yastremska | 2 | 7^{7} | 3
3 | (Switzerland) B Bencic | 6 | 6^{5} | 6

Third round
5 | (United States) M Keys | 6 | 7
(Hungary) A Bondár | 2 | 5
13 | (Czech Republic) S Bejlek | 6^{4} | 2
3 | (Switzerland) B Bencic | 7^{7} | 6

Quarterfinals
5 | (United States) M Keys | 4 | 6 | 6
3 | (Switzerland) B Bencic | 6 | 3 | 2

==== Section 4 ====
First round
(United States) A Krueger | 6 | 1 | 6
(United States) C McNally | 4 | 6 | 3
LL | (United States) E Kalieva | 6 | 3 | 3
(United States) M Kessler | 4 | 6 | 6
WC | (United States) S Stephens | 2 | 0
(Mexico) R Zarazúa | 6 | 6
(China) S Zhang | 3 | 0
(Ukraine) Y Starodubtseva | 6 | 6

Second round
17 | (United States) P Stearns | 7^{10} | 7
(United States) A Krueger | 6^{8} | 5
(United States) M Kessler | 6 | 6
12 | (Indonesia) J Tjen | 2 | 1
15 | (United States) H Baptiste | 6 | 3 | 4
(Mexico) R Zarazúa | 3 | 6 | 6
(Ukraine) Y Starodubtseva | 3 | 6 | 6
LL | (Georgia (country)) E Gorgodze | 6 | 1 | 2

Third round
17 | (United States) P Stearns | 0 | 6 | 4
(United States) M Kessler | 6 | 3 | 6
(Mexico) R Zarazúa | 1 | 0
(Ukraine) Y Starodubtseva | 6 | 6

Quarterfinals
(United States) M Kessler | 4 | 4
(Ukraine) Y Starodubtseva | 6 | 6

== Qualifying ==
=== Seeds ===
1. (Ukraine) Yuliia Starodubtseva (moved to main draw)
2. (Croatia) Donna Vekić (qualified)
3. (Czech Republic) Darja Vidmanová (qualifying competition, lucky loser)
4. (China) Yuan Yue (qualifying competition, lucky loser)
5. (Uzbekistan) Polina Kudermetova (qualified)
6. (United States) Elvina Kalieva (qualifying competition, lucky loser)
7. (United States) Whitney Osuigwe (first round)
8. (Bulgaria) Viktoriya Tomova (qualified)
9. (United States) Kayla Day (qualified)
10. (Georgia (country)) Ekaterine Gorgodze (qualifying competition, lucky loser)
11. (United States) Mary Stoiana (qualified)
12. (Japan) Aoi Ito (first round)

=== Qualifiers ===
1. (Bulgaria) Viktoriya Tomova
2. (Croatia) Donna Vekić
3. (United States) Mary Stoiana
4. (United States) Kayla Day
5. (Uzbekistan) Polina Kudermetova
6. (United States) Akasha Urhobo

=== Lucky losers ===
1. (Czech Republic) Darja Vidmanová
2. (United States) Elvina Kalieva
3. (China) Yuan Yue
4. (Georgia (country)) Ekaterine Gorgodze

=== Qualifying draw ===
==== First qualifier ====
First round
Alt | (Italy) Tatiana Pieri | 0 | 3
(United States) Ayana Akli | 6 | 6
WC | (United States) Usue Maitane Arconada | 2 | 3
8 | (Bulgaria) Viktoriya Tomova | 6 | 6

Qualifying competition
(United States) Ayana Akli | 6 | 1 | 1
8 | (Bulgaria) Viktoriya Tomova | 3 | 6 | 6

==== Second qualifier ====
First round
2/WC | (Croatia) Donna Vekić | 6 | 6
PR | (United States) Sachia Vickery | 2 | 2
(Spain) Aliona Bolsova | 0 | 6 | 6^{5}
10 | (Georgia (country)) Ekaterine Gorgodze | 6 | 2 | 7^{7}

Qualifying competition
2/WC | (Croatia) Donna Vekić | 6 | 6
10 | (Georgia (country)) Ekaterine Gorgodze | 2 | 3

==== Third qualifier ====
First round
3 | (Czech Republic) Darja Vidmanova | 6 | 7
(Serbia) Katarina Jokić | 2 | 5
WC | (France) Kristina Mladenovic | 6 | 3 | 3
11 | (United States) Mary Stoiana | 3 | 6 | 6

Qualifying competition
3 | (Czech Republic) Darja Vidmanova | 2 | 6^{2}
11 | (United States) Mary Stoiana | 6 | 7^{7}

==== Fourth qualifier ====
First round
4 | (China) Yuan Yue | 4 | 6 | 6
(Sweden) Kajsa Rinaldo Persson | 6 | 4 | 3
(United States) Haley Giavara | 0 | 2
9 | (United States) Kayla Day | 6 | 6

Qualifying competition
4 | (China) Yuan Yue | 1 | 4
9 | (United States) Kayla Day | 6 | 6

==== Fifth qualifier ====
First round
5 | (Uzbekistan) Polina Kudermetova | 6 | 2 | 7
(United States) Carolyn Ansari | 2 | 6 | 5
(Netherlands) Eva Vedder | 6 | 6
12 | (Japan) Aoi Ito | 2 | 1

Qualifying competition
5 | (Uzbekistan) Polina Kudermetova | 6 | 6
(Netherlands) Eva Vedder | 3 | 2

==== Sixth qualifier ====
First round
6 | (United States) Elvina Kalieva | 6 | 6
PR | (United States) Madison Brengle | 2 | 0
(United States) Akasha Urhobo | 6 | 6
7 | (United States) Whitney Osuigwe | 2 | 2

Qualifying competition
6 | (United States) Elvina Kalieva | 1 | 1
(United States) Akasha Urhobo | 6 | 6
