= 1983 Family Circle Cup =

- Date: April 4–10
- Edition: 11th
- Draw: 64S / 32D
- Prize money: $200,000
- Surface: Clay / outdoor
- Location: Hilton Head Island, SC, U.S.
- Venue: Sea Pines Plantation

Champions

Singles
- (United States) Martina Navratilova

Doubles
- (United States) Martina Navratilova (United States) Candy Reynolds
← 1982 ·	Family Circle Cup	· 1984 →

The 1983 Family Circle Cup was a women's tennis tournament played on outdoor clay courts at the Sea Pines Plantation on Hilton Head Island, South Carolina in the United States that was part of the 1983 Virginia Slims World Championship Series. It was the 11th edition of the tournament and was held from April 4 through April 10, 1983. Martina Navratilova won the singles title and earned $34,000 first-prize money.

== Finals ==
=== Singles ===
(United States) Martina Navratilova defeated (United States) Tracy Austin 5–7, 6–1, 6–0

- It was Navratilova's 6th singles title of the year and the 76th of her career.

=== Doubles ===
(United States) Martina Navratilova / (United States) Candy Reynolds defeated (United States) Andrea Jaeger / (United States) Paula Smith 6–2, 6–3

- It was Navratilova's 12th title of the year and the 159th of her career. It was Reynolds' 3rd title of the year and the 11th of her career.

== Prize money ==
Event	W	F	3rd	4th	QF	Round of 16	Round of 32
Singles	$34,000	$17,000	$8,400	$4,100	$2,100	$1,150	$575
