= 1981 Family Circle Cup =

- Date: April 7–12
- Edition: 9th
- Draw: 64S / 32D
- Prize money: $150,000
- Surface: Clay / outdoor
- Location: Hilton Head Island, SC, U.S.
- Venue: Sea Pines Racquet Club

Champions

Singles
- (United States) Chris Evert

Doubles
- (United States) Rosemary Casals / (Australia) Wendy Turnbull
← 1980 ·	Family Circle Cup	· 1982 →

The 1981 Family Circle Cup was a women's tennis tournament played on outdoor clay courts at the Sea Pines Racquet Club on Hilton Head Island, South Carolina in the United States that was part of the 1981 Avon Championships World Championship Series. It was the ninth edition of the tournament and was held from April 7 through April 12, 1981. First-seeded Chris Evert won the singles title and earned $30,000 first-prize money.

== Finals ==
=== Singles ===
(United States) Chris Evert defeated (United States) Pam Shriver 6–3, 6–2

- It was Evert's 3rd singles title of the year and the 104th of her career.

=== Doubles ===
(United States) Rosemary Casals / (Australia) 'Wendy Turnbull defeated (Socialist Federal Republic of Yugoslavia) Mima Jaušovec / (United States) Pam Shriver 7–5, 7–5

== Prize money ==
Event	W	F	3rd	4th	QF	Round of 16	Round of 32	Round of 64
Singles	$30,000	$15,000	$7,600	$7,200	$3,260	$1,625	$800	$350
