= 1990 Family Circle Cup =

- Date: April 2–8
- Edition: 18th
- Category: Tier I
- Draw: 56S / 28D
- Prize money: $500,000
- Surface: Clay / outdoor
- Location: Hilton Head Island, SC, U.S.
- Venue: Sea Pines Plantation

Champions

Singles
- (United States) Martina Navratilova

Doubles
- (United States) Martina Navratilova (Spain) Arantxa Sánchez Vicario
← 1989 ·	Family Circle Cup	· 1991 →

The 1990 Family Circle Cup was a women's tennis tournament played on outdoor clay courts at the Sea Pines Plantation on Hilton Head Island, South Carolina in the United States and was part of Tier I of the 1990 WTA Tour. It was the 18th edition of the tournament and ran from April 2 through April 8, 1990. First-seeded Martina Navratilova won the singles title, her fourth at the event.

== Finals ==
=== Singles ===
(United States) Martina Navratilova defeated (United States) Jennifer Capriati 6–2, 6–4

- It was Navratilova's 4th singles title of the year and the 150th of her career.

=== Doubles ===
(United States) Martina Navratilova / (Spain) Arantxa Sánchez Vicario defeated (Argentina) Mercedes Paz / (Soviet Union) Natasha Zvereva 6–2, 6–1

- It was Navratilova's 3rd doubles title of the year and the 153rd of her career. It was Sánchez Vicario's 1st doubles title of the year and the 2nd of her career.
