= 1973 Family Circle Cup =

- Date: May 1–5
- Edition: 1st
- Category: Virginia Slims Circuit
- Draw: 16S / 8D
- Prize money: $100,000
- Surface: Clay / outdoor
- Location: Hilton Head Island, U.S
- Venue: Sea Pines Plantation

Champions

Singles
- (United States) Rosemary Casals

Doubles
- (France) Françoise Dürr / (Netherlands) Betty Stöve
Family Circle Cup	· 1974 →

The 1973 Family Circle Cup was a women's tennis tournament played on outdoor clay courts at the Sea Pines Plantation on Hilton Head Island, South Carolina in the United States. The event was part of the 1973 Virginia Slims Circuit. It was the inaugural edition of the tournament and was held from May 1 through May 5, 1973. Fourth-seeded Rosemary Casals won the singles title and earned $30,000 first-prize money.

== Finals ==
=== Singles ===
(United States) Rosemary Casals defeated (United States) Nancy Richey 3–6, 6–1, 7–5

=== Doubles ===
(France) Françoise Dürr / (Netherlands) Betty Stöve defeated (United States) Rosemary Casals / (United States) Billie Jean King 3–6, 6–4, 6–3
