= 1974 Family Circle Cup =

- Date: April 30 – May 5
- Edition: 2nd
- Category: WTA Tour
- Draw: 32S / 16D
- Prize money: $100,000
- Surface: Clay / outdoor
- Location: Hilton Head Island, SC, U.S
- Venue: Sea Pines Racquet Club

Champions

Singles
- (United States) Chris Evert

Doubles
- (United States) Rosemary Casals / (Soviet Union) Olga Morozova
| ← 1973 · | Family Circle Cup | · 1975 → |

The 1974 Family Circle Cup was a women's tennis tournament played on outdoor clay courts at the Sea Pines Racquet Club on Hilton Head Island, South Carolina in the United States. The event was part of the 1974 WTA Tour. It was the second edition of the tournament and was held from April 30 through May 5, 1974. First-seeded Chris Evert won the singles title and earned $30,000 first-prize money.

== Finals ==
=== Singles ===
(United States) Chris Evert defeated (Australia) Kerry Melville 6–1, 6–3

- It was Evert's 6th title of the year and the 29th of her career.

=== Doubles ===
(United States) Rosemary Casals / (Soviet Union) Olga Morozova defeated (Australia) Helen Gourlay / (Australia) Karen Krantzcke 6–2, 6–1
