= 1978 Family Circle Cup =

- Date: April 10–16
- Edition: 6th
- Category: Colgate Series (AAA)
- Draw: 32S / 16D
- Prize money: $125,000
- Surface: Clay / outdoor
- Location: Hilton Head Island, U.S
- Venue: Sea Pines Plantation

Champions

Singles
- (United States) Chris Evert

Doubles
- (United States) Billie Jean King / (United States) Martina Navratilova
← 1977 ·	Family Circle Cup	· 1979 →

The 1978 Family Circle Cup was a women's tennis tournament played on outdoor clay courts at the Sea Pines Plantation on Hilton Head Island, South Carolina in the United States. The event was part of the AAA (Note: Tournaments with prize money for the women of at least $100,000.) category of the 1978 Colgate Series. It was the sixth edition of the tournament and was held from April 10 through April 16, 1978. Second-seeded Chris Evert won the singles title and earned $26,000 first-prize money.

== Finals ==
=== Singles ===
(United States) Chris Evert defeated (Australia) Kerry Reid 6–2, 6–0

- It was Evert's 2nd singles title of the year and the 80th of her career.

=== Doubles ===
(United States) Billie Jean King / (United States) Martina Navratilova defeated (United States) Mona Guerrant / (South Africa) Greer Stevens 6–3, 7–5

== Prize money ==
Event	W	F	SF	QF	Round of 16	Round of 32
Singles	$26,000	$13,000	$6,200	$3,000	$1,600	$900
