= 1976 Family Circle Cup =

- Date: April 26 – May 2
- Edition: 4th
- Category: WTA Tour
- Draw: 32S / 16D
- Prize money: $100,000
- Surface: Clay / outdoor
- Location: Amelia Island, Florida, U.S.

Champions

Singles
- (United States) Chris Evert

Doubles
- (South Africa) Ilana Kloss / (South Africa) Linky Boshoff
← 1975 ·	Family Circle Cup	· 1977 →

The 1976 Family Circle Cup was a women's tennis tournament played on outdoor clay courts at Amelia Island, Florida in the United States. The event was part of the 1976 WTA Tour. It was the fourth edition of the tournament and was held from March 28 through April 2, 1976. First-seeded Chris Evert won the singles title, her third consecutive title at the event, and earned $25,000 first-prize money.

== Finals ==
=== Singles ===
(United States) Chris Evert defeated (Australia) Kerry Reid 6–2, 6–2

- It was Evert's 6th singles title of the year and the 61st of her career.

=== Doubles ===
(South Africa) Ilana Kloss / (South Africa) Linky Boshoff defeated (United States) Kathy Kuykendall / (United States) Valerie Ziegenfuss 6–3, 6–2
