= 1982 Family Circle Cup =

- Date: April 5–11
- Edition: 10th
- Draw: 64S / 32D
- Prize money: $200,000
- Surface: Clay / outdoor
- Location: Hilton Head Island, SC, U.S.
- Venue: Sea Pines Racquet Club

Champions

Singles
- (United States) Martina Navratilova

Doubles
- (United States) Martina Navratilova / (United States) Pam Shriver
← 1981 ·	Family Circle Cup	· 1983 →

The 1982 Family Circle Cup was a women's tennis tournament played on outdoor clay courts at the Sea Pines Racquet Club on Hilton Head Island, South Carolina in the United States that was part of the 1982 Avon Championships World Championship Series. It was the 10th edition of the tournament and was held from April 5 through April 11, 1982. Second-seeded Martina Navratilova won the singles title and earned $34,000 first-prize money.

== Finals ==
=== Singles ===
(United States) Martina Navratilova defeated (United States) Andrea Jaeger 6–4, 6–2

- It was Navratilova's 6th singles title of the year and the 61st of her career.

=== Doubles ===
(United States) Martina Navratilova / (United States) Pam Shriver defeated (United States) JoAnne Russell / (Romania) Virginia Ruzici 6–1, 6–2

== Prize money ==
Event	W	F	3rd	4th	QF	Round of 16	Round of 32
Singles	$34,000	$17,500	$8,400	$4,100	$2,100	$1,150	$575
