= 1984 Family Circle Cup =

- Date: April 9–15
- Edition: 12th
- Draw: 64S / 32D
- Prize money: $200,000
- Surface: Clay / outdoor
- Location: Hilton Head Island, SC, U.S.
- Venue: Sea Pines Plantation

Champions

Singles
- (United States) Chris Evert-Lloyd

Doubles
- (West Germany) Claudia Kohde-Kilsch (Czechoslovakia) Hana Mandlíková
← 1983 ·	Family Circle Cup	· 1985 →

The 1984 Family Circle Cup was a tennis tournament played on outdoor clay courts in Hilton Head, South Carolina in the United States that was part of the 1984 Virginia Slims World Championship Series. The tournament was held from April 9 through April 15, 1984. First-seeded Chris Evert-Lloyd won the singles title, her seventh at the event.

== Finals ==
=== Singles ===
(United States) Chris Evert-Lloyd defeated (West Germany) Claudia Kohde-Kilsch 6–2, 6–3

- It was Evert's 2nd singles title of the year and the 128th of her career.

=== Doubles ===
(West Germany) Claudia Kohde-Kilsch / (Czechoslovakia) Hana Mandlíková defeated (United Kingdom) Anne Hobbs / (United States) Sharon Walsh 6–3, 6–3

- It was Kohde-Kilsch's 1st title of the year and the 7th of her career. It was Mandlíková's 7th title of the year and the 25th of her career.
