= 1987 Family Circle Cup =

- Date: April 6–12
- Edition: 15th
- Category: Category 4
- Draw: 56S / 28D
- Prize money: $300,000
- Surface: Clay / outdoor
- Location: Hilton Head Island, SC, U.S.
- Venue: Sea Pines Plantation

Champions

Singles
- (West Germany) Steffi Graf

Doubles
- (Argentina) Mercedes Paz / (West Germany) Eva Pfaff
- Family Circle Cup

The 1987 Family Circle Cup was a women's tennis tournament played on outdoor clay courts at the Sea Pines Plantation on Hilton Head Island, South Carolina in the United States. It was part of the Category 4 tier of the 1987 WTA Tour. It was the 15th edition of the tournament and ran from April 6 through April 12, 1987. First-seeded Steffi Graf won her second consecutive singles title at the event and earned $60,000 in first-prize money.

== Finals ==
=== Singles ===
(West Germany) Steffi Graf defeated (Bulgaria) Manuela Maleeva 6–2, 4–6, 6–3

- It was Graf's 3rd singles title of the year and the 11th of her career.

=== Doubles ===
(Argentina) Mercedes Paz / (West Germany) Eva Pfaff defeated (United States) Zina Garrison / (United States) Lori McNeil 7–6^{(8–6)}, 7–5

- It was Paz' 1st doubles title of the year and the 6th of her career. It was Pfaff's 1st doubles title of the year and the 5th of her career.
