= Karen Schimper =

South African tennis player (born 1967)

- Full name: Karen Schimper
- Country (sports): South Africa
- Born: 26 May 1967 (age 59)
- Retired: 1994
- Prize money: $126,308

Singles
- Career record: 112-77
- Career titles: 2 ITF
- Highest ranking: No. 75 (23 May 1988)

Grand Slam singles results
- French Open: 4R (1987)
- Wimbledon: 3R (1988)
- US Open: 2R (1987)

Doubles
- Career record: 34-51
- Highest ranking: No. 78 (10 April 1989)

Grand Slam doubles results
- French Open: 2R (1987)
- Wimbledon: 2R (1989)
- US Open: 1R (1987, 1988)

Karen Schimper (born 26 May 1967) is a former professional tennis player from South Africa.

== Biography ==
Schimper, who comes from Bloemfontein, began competing on the professional tour in 1986, winning two ITF singles titles.

At the 1987 French Open she made it to the four round, competing as a qualifier. She had with wins over Maria Lindström, Lisa Bonder and Terry Phelps, before being eliminated by Gabriela Sabatini.

Her career best ranking of 75 in the world came in 1988.

== ITF finals ==
$25,000 tournaments
$5–10,000 tournaments

=== Singles (2–3) ===
Result	No.	Date	Tournament	Surface	Opponent	Score
Win	1.	13 July 1986	Boynton Beach, United States	Hard	(United States) Sheri Norris	6–0, 6–3
Win	1.	20 July 1986	Midland, United States	Clay	(New Zealand) Ruth Seeman	6–3, 6–2
Loss	3.	29 November 1986	Pretoria, South Africa	Hard	(South Africa) Dianne Van Rensburg	6–4, 1–6, 4–6
Loss	4.	8 December 1986	Johannesburg, South Africa	Hard	(France) Marie-Christine Damas	4–6, 4–6
Loss	5.	22 December 1986	Johannesburg, South Africa	Hard	(South Africa) Elna Reinach	6-2, 3-6, 1-6

=== Doubles (0–2) ===
Outcome	No.	Date	Tournament	Surface	Partner	Opponents	Score
Loss	1.	30 June 1986	Tampa, United States	Clay	(United States) Brenda Niemeyer	(United States) Katrina Adams (Mexico) Heliane Steden	6–4, 1–6, 3–6
Loss	2.	24 November 1986	Pretoria, South Africa	Hard	(South Africa) Janet Kock	(United States) Mary Dailey (South Africa) Dianne Van Rensburg	5–7, 4–6
