= Charleston Open =

Tennis tournament in South Carolina, US

Coordinates: 32°51′41″N 79°54′13″W

WTA Tour
- Founded: 1973; 53 years ago
- Editions: 54 (2026)
- Location: Hilton Head Island, SC, U.S. (1973–74, 1977–2000); Amelia Island, FL, U.S. (1975–76); Daniel Island, SC, U.S. (2001–current)
- Venue: LTP-Daniel Island
- Category: WTA 500
- Surface: Clay (green) – outdoors
- Draw: 48S / 24Q / 16D
- Prize money: US$2,300,000 (2026)
- Website: creditonecharlestonopen.com

Current champions (2026)
- Singles: (United States) Jessica Pegula
- Doubles: (United States) Desirae Krawczyk (United States) Caty McNally

The Charleston Open, currently sponsored by Credit One, is a WTA Tour-affiliated professional tennis event, held every year since 1973. The tournament celebrated 50 years in 2022 at the newly renovated Credit One Stadium located in Charleston, South Carolina, USA. It is played on the green clay courts at LTP Daniel Island tennis center (which contains the 10,200-seat Credit One Stadium) on Daniel Island in Charleston.

It is the oldest professional all-women's tournament in America with a $2.5 million purse, announced in 2026, making it the first standalone WTA 500 event to make its purse equal to those of comparable events on the men's ATP Tour.

== Tournament history ==
From its inception in 1973 to 2000, the tournament was held at the Sea Pines Plantation on Hilton Head Island with the exception of 1975 and 1976 when it was played on Amelia Island off the coast of Florida. The event moved to Charleston, and specifically Daniel Island, in 2001.

From 1973 to 2015, the title sponsor was Family Circle magazine, which had made it the longest-running title sponsor in professional tennis. Chinese automaker Geely, which has a factory in nearby Berkeley County for their Volvo brand, took over sponsorship from 2016 to 2021. Credit One Bank, which had sponsored the 2020 tournament, became the title sponsor of both the tournament and stadium in July 2021. Also in 2021, two tournaments were organised in consecutive weeks as a makeup tournament for those cancelled by pandemic restrictions. The Medical University of South Carolina sponsored the event.

From 1990 to 2008, the tournament was classified as a WTA Tier I event. In 2009, it was downgraded to a WTA Premier tournament. It celebrated its 40th year in 2012 by naming its main stadium court in honor of Billie Jean King. With the reorganization of the WTA's schedule in 2021, the tournament became a WTA 500 tournament. The 2021 second tournament held the week afterwards was part of the WTA 250 tournaments list.

In February 2026, Ben Navarro (Tournament Owner) announced that the Charleston Open would increase its prize money to a record $2.5 million. This established the event as the first standalone WTA 500 tournament to achieve prize money parity with comparable men's ATP Tour events, reaching the milestone seven years ahead of the WTA's 2033 goal for equal pay.

== Past finals ==
=== Singles ===
| Year | Champion | Runner-up | Score |
|---|---|---|---|
| 1973 | (United States) Rosemary Casals | (United States) Nancy Richey | 3–6, 6–1, 7–5 |
| 1974 | (United States) Chris Evert | (Australia) Kerry Melville | 6–1, 6–3 |
| 1975 | (United States) Chris Evert (2) | (Czechoslovakia) Martina Navratilova | 7–5, 6–4 |
| 1976 | (United States) Chris Evert (3) | (Australia) Kerry Reid | 6–2, 6–2 |
| 1977 | (United States) Chris Evert (4) | (United States) Billie Jean King | 6–0, 6–1 |
| 1978 | (United States) Chris Evert (5) | (Australia) Kerry Reid | 6–2, 6–0 |
| 1979 | (United States) Tracy Austin | (Australia) Kerry Reid | 7–6^{(7–3)}, 7–6^{(9–7)} |
| 1980 | (United States) Tracy Austin (2) | (Czechoslovakia) Regina Maršíková | 3–6, 6–1, 6–0 |
| 1981 | (United States) Chris Evert (6) | (United States) Pam Shriver | 6–3, 6–2 |
| 1982 | (United States) Martina Navratilova | (United States) Andrea Jaeger | 6–4, 6–2 |
| 1983 | (United States) Martina Navratilova (2) | (United States) Tracy Austin | 5–7, 6–1, 6–0 |
| 1984 | (United States) Chris Evert (7) | (West Germany) Claudia Kohde-Kilsch | 6–2, 6–3 |
| 1985 | (United States) Chris Evert (8) | (Argentina) Gabriela Sabatini | 6–4, 6–0 |
| 1986 | (West Germany) Steffi Graf | (United States) Chris Evert | 6–4, 7–5 |
| 1987 | (West Germany) Steffi Graf (2) | (Bulgaria) Manuela Maleeva-Fragnière | 6–2, 4–6, 6–3 |
↓ Tier II event ↓
| 1988 | (United States) Martina Navratilova (3) | (Argentina) Gabriela Sabatini | 6–1, 4–6, 6–4 |
| 1989 | (West Germany) Steffi Graf (3) | (Soviet Union) Natasha Zvereva | 6–1, 6–1 |
↓ Tier I event ↓
| 1990 | (United States) Martina Navratilova (4) | (United States) Jennifer Capriati | 6–2, 6–4 |
| 1991 | (Argentina) Gabriela Sabatini | (Soviet Union) Leila Meskhi | 6–1, 6–1 |
| 1992 | (Argentina) Gabriela Sabatini (2) | (Spain) Conchita Martínez | 6–1, 6–4 |
| 1993 | (Germany) Steffi Graf (4) | (Spain) Arantxa Sánchez Vicario | 7–6^{(10–8)}, 6–1 |
| 1994 | (Spain) Conchita Martínez | (Belarus) Natalia Zvereva | 6–4, 6–0 |
| 1995 | (Spain) Conchita Martínez (2) | (Bulgaria) Magdalena Maleeva | 6–1, 6–1 |
| 1996 | (Spain) Arantxa Sánchez Vicario | (Austria) Barbara Paulus | 6–2, 2–6, 6–2 |
| 1997 | (Switzerland) Martina Hingis | (United States) Monica Seles | 3–6, 6–3, 7–6^{(7–5)} |
| 1998 | (South Africa) Amanda Coetzer | (Romania) Irina Spîrlea | 6–3, 6–4 |
| 1999 | (Switzerland) Martina Hingis (2) | (Russia) Anna Kournikova | 6–4, 6–3 |
| 2000 | (France) Mary Pierce | (Spain) Arantxa Sánchez Vicario | 6–1, 6–0 |
| 2001 | (United States) Jennifer Capriati | (Switzerland) Martina Hingis | 6–0, 4–6, 6–4 |
| 2002 | (Croatia) Iva Majoli | (Switzerland) Patty Schnyder | 7–6^{(7–5)}, 6–4 |
| 2003 | (Belgium) Justine Henin | (United States) Serena Williams | 6–3, 6–4 |
| 2004 | (United States) Venus Williams | (Spain) Conchita Martínez | 2–6, 6–2, 6–1 |
| 2005 | (Belgium) Justine Henin (2) | (Russia) Elena Dementieva | 7–5, 6–4 |
| 2006 | (Russia) Nadia Petrova | (Switzerland) Patty Schnyder | 6–3, 4–6, 6–1 |
| 2007 | (Serbia) Jelena Janković | (Russia) Dinara Safina | 6–2, 6–2 |
| 2008 | (United States) Serena Williams | (Russia) Vera Zvonareva | 6–4, 3–6, 6–3 |
↓ Premier event ↓
| 2009 | (Germany) Sabine Lisicki | (Denmark) Caroline Wozniacki | 6–2, 6–4 |
| 2010 | (Australia) Samantha Stosur | (Russia) Vera Zvonareva | 6–0, 6–3 |
| 2011 | (Denmark) Caroline Wozniacki | (Russia) Elena Vesnina | 6–2, 6–3 |
| 2012 | (United States) Serena Williams (2) | (Czech Republic) Lucie Šafářová | 6–0, 6–1 |
| 2013 | (United States) Serena Williams (3) | (Serbia) Jelena Janković | 3–6, 6–0, 6–2 |
| 2014 | (Germany) Andrea Petkovic | (Slovakia) Jana Čepelová | 7–5, 6–2 |
| 2015 | (Germany) Angelique Kerber | (United States) Madison Keys | 6–2, 4–6, 7–5 |
| 2016 | (United States) Sloane Stephens | (Russia) Elena Vesnina | 7–6^{(7–4)}, 6–2 |
| 2017 | (Russia) Daria Kasatkina | (Latvia) Jeļena Ostapenko | 6–3, 6–1 |
| 2018 | (Netherlands) Kiki Bertens | (Germany) Julia Görges | 6–2, 6–1 |
| 2019 | (United States) Madison Keys | (Denmark) Caroline Wozniacki | 7–6^{(7–5)}, 6–3 |
↓ WTA 500 event ↓
| 2021 (a) | (Russia) Veronika Kudermetova | (Montenegro) Danka Kovinić | 6–4, 6–2 |
↓ WTA 250 event ↓
| 2021 (b) | (Australia) Astra Sharma | (Tunisia) Ons Jabeur | 2–6, 7–5, 6–1 |
↓ WTA 500 event ↓
| 2022 | (Switzerland) Belinda Bencic | (Tunisia) Ons Jabeur | 6–1, 5–7, 6–4 |
| 2023 | (Tunisia) Ons Jabeur | (Switzerland) Belinda Bencic | 7–6^{(8–6)}, 6–4 |
| 2024 | (United States) Danielle Collins | Daria Kasatkina | 6–2, 6–1 |
| 2025 | (United States) Jessica Pegula | (United States) Sofia Kenin | 6–3, 7–5 |
| 2026 | (United States) Jessica Pegula (2) | (Ukraine) Yuliia Starodubtseva | 6–2, 6–2 |

=== Doubles ===
| Year | Champions | Runners-up | Score |
|---|---|---|---|
| 1973 | (France) Françoise Dürr (Netherlands) Betty Stöve | (United States) Rosemary Casals (United States) Billie Jean King | 3–6, 6–4, 6–3 |
| 1974 | (United States) Rosemary Casals (Soviet Union) Olga Morozova | (Australia) Helen Gourlay (Australia) Karen Krantzcke | 6–2, 6–1 |
| 1975 | (Australia) Evonne Goolagong Cawley (United Kingdom) Virginia Wade | (United States) Rosemary Casals (Soviet Union) Olga Morozova | 4–6, 6–4, 6–2 |
| 1976 | (South Africa) Ilana Kloss (South Africa) Linky Boshoff | (United States) Kathy Kuykendall (United States) Valerie Ziegenfuss | 6–3, 6–2 |
| 1977 | (United States) Rosemary Casals (2) (United States) Chris Evert | (France) Françoise Dürr (United Kingdom) Virginia Wade | 1–6, 6–2, 6–3 |
| 1978 | (United States) Billie Jean King (United States) Martina Navratilova | (United States) Mona Guerrant (South Africa) Greer Stevens | 6–3, 7–5 |
| 1979 | (United States) Rosemary Casals (3) (United States) Martina Navratilova (2) | (France) Françoise Dürr (Netherlands) Betty Stöve | 6–4, 7–5 |
| 1980 | (United States) Kathy Jordan (United States) Anne Smith | (United States) Candy Reynolds (United States) Paula Smith | 6–2, 6–1 |
| 1981 | (United States) Rosemary Casals (4) (Australia) Wendy Turnbull | (Socialist Federal Republic of Yugoslavia) Mima Jaušovec (United States) Pam Shriver | 7–5, 7–5 |
| 1982 | (United States) Martina Navratilova (3) (United States) Pam Shriver | (United States) JoAnne Russell (Romania) Virginia Ruzici | 6–1, 6–2 |
| 1983 | (United States) Martina Navratilova (4) (United States) Candy Reynolds | (United States) Andrea Jaeger (United States) Paula Smith | 6–2, 6–3 |
| 1984 | (West Germany) Claudia Kohde-Kilsch (Czechoslovakia) Hana Mandlíková | (United Kingdom) Anne Hobbs (United States) Sharon Walsh | 7–5, 6–2 |
| 1985 | (South Africa) Rosalyn Fairbank (United States) Pam Shriver (2) | (Soviet Union) Svetlana Parkhomenko (Soviet Union) Larisa Savchenko | 6–4, 6–1 |
| 1986 | (United States) Chris Evert (2) (United States) Anne White | (West Germany) Steffi Graf (France) Catherine Tanvier | 6–3, 6–3 |
| 1987 | (Argentina) Mercedes Paz (West Germany) Eva Pfaff | (United States) Zina Garrison (United States) Lori McNeil | 7–6^{(8–6)}, 7–5 |
| 1988 | (United States) Lori McNeil (United States) Martina Navratilova (5) | (West Germany) Claudia Kohde-Kilsch (Argentina) Gabriela Sabatini | 6–2, 2–6, 6–3 |
| 1989 | (Australia) Hana Mandlíková (United States) Martina Navratilova (6) | (United States) Mary-Lou Daniels (United States) Wendy White | 6–4, 6–1 |
↓ Tier I event ↓
| 1990 | (United States) Martina Navratilova (7) (Spain) Arantxa Sánchez Vicario | (Argentina) Mercedes Paz (Soviet Union) Natasha Zvereva | 6–2, 6–1 |
| 1991 | (Germany) Claudia Kohde-Kilsch (2) (Soviet Union) Natasha Zvereva | (United States) Mary-Lou Daniels (South Africa) Lise Gregory | 6–4, 6–0 |
| 1992 | (Spain) Arantxa Sánchez Vicario (2) (Belarus) Natasha Zvereva (2) | (Latvia) Larisa Savchenko-Neiland (Czechoslovakia) Jana Novotná | 6–4, 6–2 |
| 1993 | (United States) Gigi Fernández (Belarus) Natasha Zvereva (3) | (United States) Katrina Adams (Netherlands) Manon Bollegraf | 6–3, 6–1 |
| 1994 | (United States) Lori McNeil (2) (Spain) Arantxa Sánchez Vicario (3) | (United States) Gigi Fernández (Belarus) Natasha Zvereva | 6–4, 4–1 retired |
| 1995 | (United States) Nicole Arendt (Netherlands) Manon Bollegraf | (United States) Gigi Fernández (Belarus) Natasha Zvereva | 0–6, 6–3, 6–4 |
| 1996 | (Czech Republic) Jana Novotná (Spain) Arantxa Sánchez Vicario (4) | (United States) Gigi Fernández (United States) Mary Joe Fernández | 6–2, 6–3 |
| 1997 | (United States) Mary Joe Fernández (Switzerland) Martina Hingis | (United States) Lindsay Davenport (Czech Republic) Jana Novotná | 7–5, 4–6, 6–1 |
| 1998 | (Spain) Conchita Martínez (Argentina) Patricia Tarabini | (United States) Lisa Raymond (Australia) Rennae Stubbs | 3–6, 6–4, 6–4 |
| 1999 | (Russia) Elena Likhovtseva (Czech Republic) Jana Novotná (2) | (Austria) Barbara Schett (Switzerland) Patty Schnyder | 6–1, 6–4 |
| 2000 | (Spain) Virginia Ruano Pascual (Argentina) Paola Suárez | (Spain) Conchita Martínez (Argentina) Patricia Tarabini | 7–5, 6–3 |
| 2001 | (United States) Lisa Raymond (Australia) Rennae Stubbs | (Spain) Virginia Ruano Pascual (Argentina) Paola Suárez | 5–7, 7–6^{(7–5)}, 6–3 |
| 2002 | (United States) Lisa Raymond (2) (Australia) Rennae Stubbs (2) | (France) Alexandra Fusai (Netherlands) Caroline Vis | 6–4, 3–6, 7–6^{(7–4)} |
| 2003 | (Spain) Virginia Ruano Pascual (2) (Argentina) Paola Suárez (2) | (Slovakia) Janette Husárová (Spain) Conchita Martínez | 6–0, 6–3 |
| 2004 | (Spain) Virginia Ruano Pascual (3) (Argentina) Paola Suárez (3) | (United States) Martina Navratilova (United States) Lisa Raymond | 6–4, 6–1 |
| 2005 | (Spain) Conchita Martínez (2) (Spain) Virginia Ruano Pascual (4) | (Czech Republic) Iveta Benešová (Czech Republic) Květa Hrdličková Peschke | 6–1, 6–4 |
| 2006 | (United States) Lisa Raymond (3) (Australia) Samantha Stosur | (Spain) Virginia Ruano Pascual (United States) Meghann Shaughnessy | 3–6, 6–1, 6–1 |
| 2007 | (China) Yan Zi (China) Zheng Jie | (China) Peng Shuai (China) Sun Tiantian | 7–5, 6–0 |
| 2008 | (Slovenia) Katarina Srebotnik (Japan) Ai Sugiyama | (Romania) Edina Gallovits (Belarus) Olga Govortsova | 6–2, 6–2 |
↓ Premier event ↓
| 2009 | (United States) Bethanie Mattek-Sands (Russia) Nadia Petrova | (Latvia) Līga Dekmeijere (Switzerland) Patty Schnyder | 6–7^{(5–7)}, 6–2, [11–9] |
| 2010 | (United States) Liezel Huber (Russia) Nadia Petrova (2) | (United States) Vania King (Netherlands) Michaëlla Krajicek | 6–3, 6–4 |
| 2011 | (India) Sania Mirza (Russia) Elena Vesnina | (United States) Bethanie Mattek-Sands (United States) Meghann Shaughnessy | 6–4, 6–4 |
| 2012 | (Russia) Anastasia Pavlyuchenkova (Czech Republic) Lucie Šafářová | (Spain) Anabel Medina Garrigues (Kazakhstan) Yaroslava Shvedova | 5–7, 6–4, [10–6] |
| 2013 | (France) Kristina Mladenovic (Czech Republic) Lucie Šafářová (2) | (Czech Republic) Andrea Hlaváčková (United States) Liezel Huber | 6–3, 7–6^{(8–6)} |
| 2014 | (Spain) Anabel Medina Garrigues (Kazakhstan) Yaroslava Shvedova | (Chinese Taipei) Chan Hao-ching (Chinese Taipei) Chan Yung-jan | 7–6^{(7–4)}, 6–2 |
| 2015 | (Switzerland) Martina Hingis (2) (India) Sania Mirza (2) | (Australia) Casey Dellacqua (Croatia) Darija Jurak | 6–0, 6–4 |
| 2016 | (France) Caroline Garcia (France) Kristina Mladenovic (2) | (United States) Bethanie Mattek-Sands (Czech Republic) Lucie Šafářová | 6–2, 7–5 |
| 2017 | (United States) Bethanie Mattek-Sands (2) (Czech Republic) Lucie Šafářová (3) | (Czech Republic) Lucie Hradecká (Czech Republic) Kateřina Siniaková | 6–1, 4–6, [10–7] |
| 2018 | (Russia) Alla Kudryavtseva (Slovenia) Katarina Srebotnik (2) | (Slovenia) Andreja Klepač (Spain) María José Martínez Sánchez | 6–3, 6–3 |
| 2019 | (Germany) Anna-Lena Grönefeld (Poland) Alicja Rosolska | (Russia) Irina Khromacheva (Russia) Veronika Kudermetova | 7–6^{(9–7)}, 6–2 |
↓ WTA 500 event ↓
| 2021 (a) | (United States) Nicole Melichar (Netherlands) Demi Schuurs | (Czech Republic) Marie Bouzková (Czech Republic) Lucie Hradecká | 6–2, 6–4 |
↓ WTA 250 event ↓
| 2021 (b) | (United States) Hailey Baptiste (United States) Caty McNally | (Australia) Ellen Perez (Australia) Storm Sanders | 6–7^{(4–7)}, 6–4, [10–6] |
↓ WTA 500 event ↓
| 2022 | (Slovenia) Andreja Klepač (Poland) Magda Linette | (Czech Republic) Lucie Hradecká (India) Sania Mirza | 6–2, 4–6, [10–7] |
| 2023 | (United States) Danielle Collins (United States) Desirae Krawczyk | (Mexico) Giuliana Olmos (Japan) Ena Shibahara | 0–6, 6–4, [14–12] |
| 2024 | (United States) Ashlyn Krueger (United States) Sloane Stephens | (Ukraine) Lyudmyla Kichenok (Ukraine) Nadiia Kichenok | 1–6, 6–3, [10–7] |
| 2025 | (Latvia) Jeļena Ostapenko (New Zealand) Erin Routliffe | (United States) Caroline Dolehide (United States) Desirae Krawczyk | 6–4, 6–2 |
| 2026 | (United States) Desirae Krawczyk (2) (United States) Caty McNally (2) | (Hungary) Anna Bondár (Poland) Magdalena Fręch | 6–3, 6–2 |

=== Exhibition team tournament ===
Because of an ongoing pandemic, the tournament in 2020 was reformatted into a Laver Cup style team tournament. Each team captain's name in BOLD and listed first.

| Year | Winner | Loser | Score |
|---|---|---|---|
| 2020 | (United States) **Bethanie Mattek-Sands** (United States) Sofia Kenin (United States) Jennifer Brady (Canada) Eugenie Bouchard (United States) Caroline Dolehide (United States) Danielle Collins (United States) Emma Navarro (Australia) Ajla Tomljanović | (United States) **Madison Keys** (Belarus) Victoria Azarenka (United States) Sloane Stephens (United States) Amanda Anisimova (United States) Alison Riske (United States) Shelby Rogers (Canada) Leylah Annie Fernandez (Puerto Rico) Monica Puig | 26–22 |
