= 1982 WTA Tour =

Women's tennis circuit

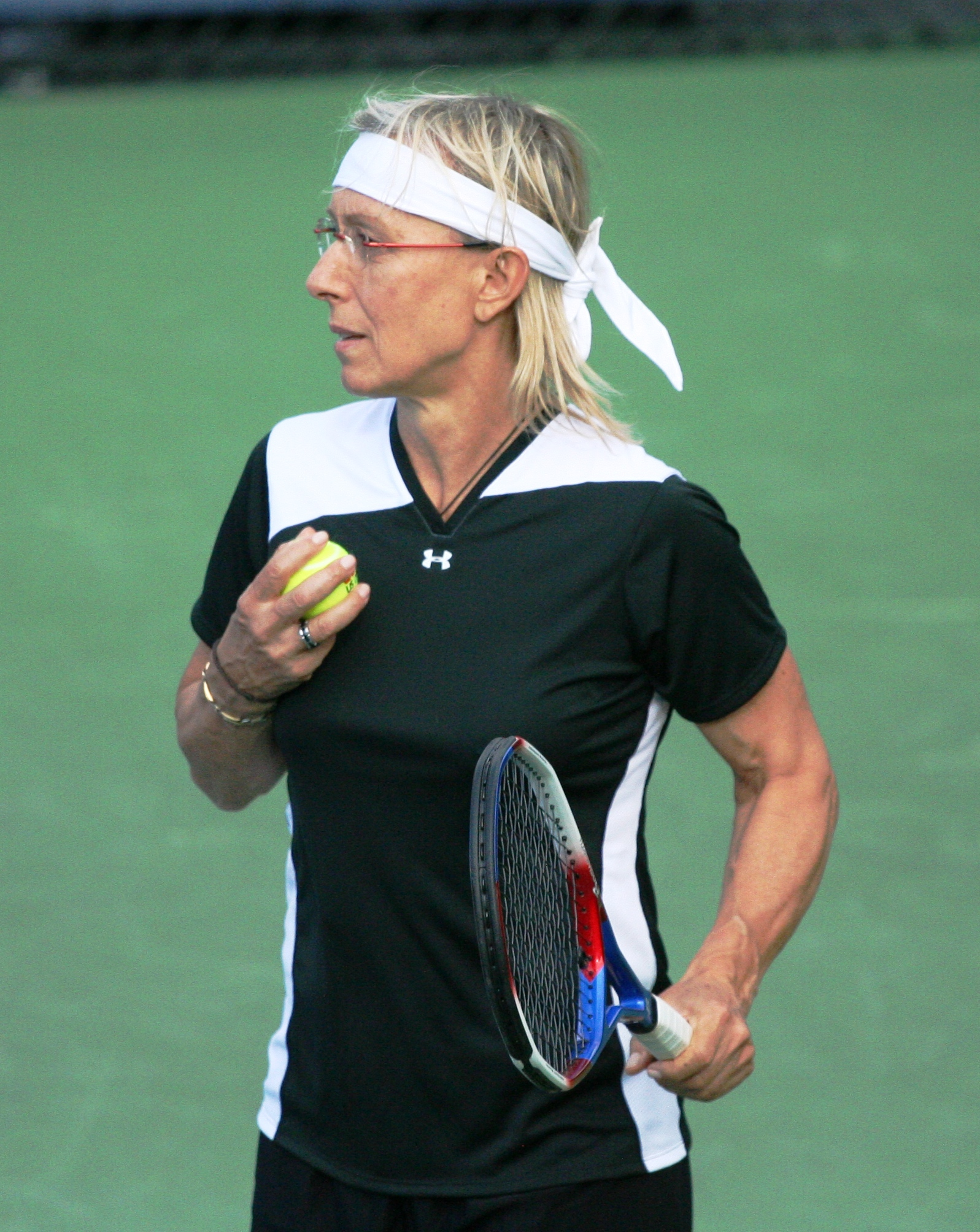
- Martina Navratilova finished the year as world No. 1 for the third time in her career. She won 15 singles tournaments during the season, including two majors at the French Open and the Wimbledon Championships. She also finished runner-up at another major, the Australian Open.

Details
- Duration: 4 January – 19 December 1982
- Edition: 10th
- Tournaments: 50
- Categories: Grand Slam (4); WTA Championships (3); Avon Championships (11); Toyota Series (29)

Achievements (singles)
- Most titles: (United States) Martina Navratilova (15)
- Most finals: (United States) Martina Navratilova (17)
- Prize money leader: (United States) Martina Navratilova ($1,475,055)
- Points leader: (United States) Martina Navratilova (19.165)

Awards
- Player of the year: (United States) Martina Navratilova
- Doubles team of the year: (United States) Martina Navratilova (United States) Pam Shriver
- Most improved player of the year: (Italy) Sabina Simmonds
- Newcomer of the year: (United States) Zina Garrison

The 1982 WTA Tour was the 10th season since the foundation of the Women's Tennis Association. It commenced on 4 January 1982, and concluded on 19 December 1982, after 36 events. The WTA Tour was the elite tour for professional women's tennis organised by the Women's Tennis Association (WTA). The tour consistent of two major circuits, the Avon Championships World Championship Series and the Toyota Series. It included the four Grand Slam tournaments and a series of other events. ITF tournaments were not part of the tour, although they awarded points for the WTA World Ranking.

== Schedule ==
The table below shows the 1982 WTA Tour schedule.

Key

Grand Slam tournaments
WTA Championships
Avon Championships Circuit
Toyota Series
Team events

=== January ===
Week	Tournament	Champions	Runners-up	Semifinalists	Quarterfinalists
4 Jan	Avon Championships of Washington; Washington, United States; Avon Championships Circuit; Carpet (i) – $200,000 – 32S/16D	(United States) Martina Navratilova; 6–2, 6–3	(United States) Anne Smith	(West Germany) Sylvia Hanika (United States) Barbara Potter	(United States) Pam Shriver (United States) Bonnie Gadusek (United States) Andrea Jaeger (West Germany) Bettina Bunge
4 Jan	Avon Championships of Washington; Washington, United States; Avon Championships Circuit; Carpet (i) – $200,000 – 32S/16D	(United States) Kathy Jordan (United States) Anne Smith; 6–2, 3–6, 6–1	(United States) Martina Navratilova (United States) Pam Shriver	(West Germany) Sylvia Hanika (United States) Barbara Potter	(United States) Pam Shriver (United States) Bonnie Gadusek (United States) Andrea Jaeger (West Germany) Bettina Bunge
11 Jan	Avon Championships of Cincinnati; Cincinnati, United States; Avon Championships Circuit; Carpet (i) – $150,000 – 32S/16D	(United States) Barbara Potter; 6–4, 7–6^{(7–3)}	(West Germany) Bettina Bunge	(United States) Anne Smith (United States) Billie Jean King	(United States) Candy Reynolds (United States) Leslie Allen (United States) Kathy Rinaldi (West Germany) Sylvia Hanika
11 Jan	Avon Championships of Cincinnati; Cincinnati, United States; Avon Championships Circuit; Carpet (i) – $150,000 – 32S/16D	(United Kingdom) Sue Barker (United States) Ann Kiyomura; 6–2, 7–6^{(7–5)}	(United States) Pam Shriver (United States) Anne Smith	(United States) Anne Smith (United States) Billie Jean King	(United States) Candy Reynolds (United States) Leslie Allen (United States) Kathy Rinaldi (West Germany) Sylvia Hanika
18 Jan	Avon Championships of Seattle; Seattle, United States; Avon Championships Circuit; Carpet (i) – $150,000 – 32S/16D	(United States) Martina Navratilova; 6–2, 6–0	(United States) Andrea Jaeger	(United States) Barbara Potter (Australia) Wendy Turnbull	(United States) Anne Smith (West Germany) Bettina Bunge (West Germany) Sylvia Hanika (Romania) Virginia Ruzici
18 Jan	Avon Championships of Seattle; Seattle, United States; Avon Championships Circuit; Carpet (i) – $150,000 – 32S/16D	(United States) Rosie Casals (Australia) Wendy Turnbull; 7–5, 6–4	(United States) Pam Shriver (United States) Anne Smith	(United States) Barbara Potter (Australia) Wendy Turnbull	(United States) Anne Smith (West Germany) Bettina Bunge (West Germany) Sylvia Hanika (Romania) Virginia Ruzici
25 Jan	Avon Championships of Chicago; Chicago, United States; Avon Championships Circuit; Carpet (i) – $150,000 – 32S/16D	(United States) Martina Navratilova; 6–4, 6–1	(Australia) Wendy Turnbull	(West Germany) Sylvia Hanika (United States) Andrea Jaeger	(United States) Andrea Leand (Czechoslovakia) Helena Suková (United States) Pam Shriver (Australia) Dianne Fromholtz
25 Jan	Avon Championships of Chicago; Chicago, United States; Avon Championships Circuit; Carpet (i) – $150,000 – 32S/16D	(United States) Martina Navratilova (United States) Pam Shriver; 7–5, 6–4	(United States) Rosie Casals (Australia) Wendy Turnbull	(West Germany) Sylvia Hanika (United States) Andrea Jaeger	(United States) Andrea Leand (Czechoslovakia) Helena Suková (United States) Pam Shriver (Australia) Dianne Fromholtz

=== February ===
Week	Tournament	Champions	Runners-up	Semifinalists	Quarterfinalists
1 Feb	Avon Championships of Detroit; Detroit, United States; Avon Championships Circuit; Carpet (i) – $150,000 – 32S/16D	(United States) Andrea Jaeger; 2–6, 6–4, 6–2	(Socialist Federal Republic of Yugoslavia) Mima Jaušovec	(Australia) Wendy Turnbull (South Africa) Rosalyn Nideffer	(United States) Anne Smith (Australia) Dianne Fromholtz (Romania) Virginia Ruzici (United States) Mary Lou Daniels
1 Feb	Avon Championships of Detroit; Detroit, United States; Avon Championships Circuit; Carpet (i) – $150,000 – 32S/16D	(United States) Leslie Allen (Socialist Federal Republic of Yugoslavia) Mima Jaušovec; 6–4, 6–0	(United States) Rosie Casals (Australia) Wendy Turnbull	(Australia) Wendy Turnbull (South Africa) Rosalyn Nideffer	(United States) Anne Smith (Australia) Dianne Fromholtz (Romania) Virginia Ruzici (United States) Mary Lou Daniels
8 Feb	Avon Championships of Kansas City; Kansas City, United States; Avon Championships Circuit; Carpet (i) – $100,000 – 16S/8D	(United States) Martina Navratilova; 6–2, 6–2	(United States) Barbara Potter	(United States) Mary Lou Piatek (Socialist Federal Republic of Yugoslavia) Mima Jaušovec	(United States) Anne Smith (Romania) Virginia Ruzici (United States) Andrea Leand (South Africa) Rosalyn Fairbank
8 Feb	Avon Championships of Kansas City; Kansas City, United States; Avon Championships Circuit; Carpet (i) – $100,000 – 16S/8D	(United States) Barbara Potter (United States) Sharon Walsh; 4–6, 6–2, 6–2	(United States) Mary Lou Piatek (United States) Anne Smith	(United States) Mary Lou Piatek (Socialist Federal Republic of Yugoslavia) Mima Jaušovec	(United States) Anne Smith (Romania) Virginia Ruzici (United States) Andrea Leand (South Africa) Rosalyn Fairbank
15 Feb	Avon Championships of Houston; Houston, United States; Avon Championships Circuit; Carpet (i) – $100,000 – 17S/10D	(West Germany) Bettina Bunge; 6–2, 3–6, 6–2	(United States) Pam Shriver	(United Kingdom) Sue Barker (Australia) Dianne Fromholtz	(United States) Wendy White (Italy) Sabina Simmonds (United States) Mary Lou Piatek (Australia) Wendy Turnbull
15 Feb	Avon Championships of Houston; Houston, United States; Avon Championships Circuit; Carpet (i) – $100,000 – 17S/10D	(United States) Kathy Jordan (United States) Pam Shriver; 7–6^{(8–6)}, 6–2	(United Kingdom) Sue Barker (United States) Sharon Walsh	(United Kingdom) Sue Barker (Australia) Dianne Fromholtz	(United States) Wendy White (Italy) Sabina Simmonds (United States) Mary Lou Piatek (Australia) Wendy Turnbull
22 Feb	Avon Championships of California; Oakland, United States; Avon Championships Circuit; Carpet (i) – $150,000 – 32S/16D	(United States) Andrea Jaeger; 7–6^{(7–5)}, 6–3	(United States) Chris Evert-Lloyd	(West Germany) Sylvia Hanika (West Germany) Claudia Kohde-Kilsch	(United States) Leslie Allen (Romania) Virginia Ruzici (Australia) Wendy Turnbull (United States) Barbara Potter
22 Feb	Avon Championships of California; Oakland, United States; Avon Championships Circuit; Carpet (i) – $150,000 – 32S/16D	(United States) Barbara Potter (United States) Sharon Walsh; 6–1, 3–6, 7–6^{(7–5)}	(United States) Kathy Jordan (United States) Pam Shriver	(West Germany) Sylvia Hanika (West Germany) Claudia Kohde-Kilsch	(United States) Leslie Allen (Romania) Virginia Ruzici (Australia) Wendy Turnbull (United States) Barbara Potter

=== March ===
Week	Tournament	Champions	Runners-up	Semifinalists	Quarterfinalists
1 Mar	Avon Championships of Los Angeles; Los Angeles, United States; Avon Championships Circuit; Hard – $150,000 – 32S/16D	(Socialist Federal Republic of Yugoslavia) Mima Jaušovec; 6–2, 7–6^{(7–4)}	(West Germany) Sylvia Hanika	(United States) Billie Jean King (United States) Leslie Allen	(South Africa) Yvonne Vermaak (United States) Andrea Leand (United Kingdom) Jo Durie (United States) Barbara Potter
1 Mar	Avon Championships of Los Angeles; Los Angeles, United States; Avon Championships Circuit; Hard – $150,000 – 32S/16D	(United States) Kathy Jordan (United States) Anne Smith; 6–3, 7–5	(United States) Barbara Potter (United States) Sharon Walsh	(United States) Billie Jean King (United States) Leslie Allen	(South Africa) Yvonne Vermaak (United States) Andrea Leand (United Kingdom) Jo Durie (United States) Barbara Potter
8 Mar	Avon Championships of Dallas; Dallas, United States; Avon Championships Circuit; Carpet (i) – $200,000 – 565/16D	(United States) Martina Navratilova; 6–3, 6–2	(Socialist Federal Republic of Yugoslavia) Mima Jaušovec	(United States) Kate Latham (Italy) Sabina Simmonds	(Australia) Wendy Turnbull (United States) Mary-Lou Piatek (United States) Leslie Allen (United States) Jennifer Russell
8 Mar	Avon Championships of Dallas; Dallas, United States; Avon Championships Circuit; Carpet (i) – $200,000 – 565/16D	(United States) Martina Navratilova (United States) Pam Shriver; 6–4, 6–4	(United States) Billie Jean King (South Africa) Ilana Kloss	(United States) Kate Latham (Italy) Sabina Simmonds	(Australia) Wendy Turnbull (United States) Mary-Lou Piatek (United States) Leslie Allen (United States) Jennifer Russell
15 Mar	Avon Championships of Boston; Boston, United States; Avon Championships Circuit; Carpet (i) – $150,000 – 32S/16D	(United States) Kathy Jordan; 7–5, 1–6, 6–4	(Australia) Wendy Turnbull	(United States) Bonnie Gadusek (United States) Andrea Leand	(United States) Anne Smith (United States) Betsy Nagelsen (South Africa) Yvonne Vermaak (United States) Billie Jean King
15 Mar	Avon Championships of Boston; Boston, United States; Avon Championships Circuit; Carpet (i) – $150,000 – 32S/16D	(United States) Kathy Jordan (United States) Anne Smith; 7–6^{(9–7)}, 2–6, 6–4	(United States) Rosie Casals (Australia) Wendy Turnbull	(United States) Bonnie Gadusek (United States) Andrea Leand	(United States) Anne Smith (United States) Betsy Nagelsen (South Africa) Yvonne Vermaak (United States) Billie Jean King
22 Mar	Avon Championships; New York City, United States; WTA championships Carpet (i) – $300,000 – 8S/4D; Singles – Doubles	(West Germany) Sylvia Hanika; 1–6, 6–3, 6–4	(United States) Martina Navratilova	(Australia) Wendy Turnbull (United States) Anne Smith	
22 Mar	Avon Championships; New York City, United States; WTA championships Carpet (i) – $300,000 – 8S/4D; Singles – Doubles	(United States) Martina Navratilova (United States) Pam Shriver; 6–4, 6–3	(United States) Kathy Jordan (United States) Anne Smith	(Australia) Wendy Turnbull (United States) Anne Smith	

=== April ===
Week	Tournament	Champions	Runners-up	Semifinalists	Quarterfinalists
5 Apr	Family Circle Cup; Hilton Head Island, United States; Toyota Series (Category 7); Clay – $200,000 – 56S/32D	(United States) Martina Navratilova; 6–4, 6–2	(United States) Andrea Jaeger	(United States) Chris Evert-Lloyd (Socialist Federal Republic of Yugoslavia) Mima Jaušovec	(United States) Pam Shriver (United States) Zina Garrison (Czechoslovakia) Hana Mandlíková (United States) Andrea Leand
5 Apr	Family Circle Cup; Hilton Head Island, United States; Toyota Series (Category 7); Clay – $200,000 – 56S/32D	(United States) Martina Navratilova (United States) Pam Shriver; 6–1, 6–2	(United States) Jennifer Russell (Romania) Virginia Ruzici	(United States) Chris Evert-Lloyd (Socialist Federal Republic of Yugoslavia) Mima Jaušovec	(United States) Pam Shriver (United States) Zina Garrison (Czechoslovakia) Hana Mandlíková (United States) Andrea Leand
12 Apr	Bridgestone Doubles Championships; Fort Worth, United States; Toyota Series (Category 5); Carpet (i) – $150,000 – 8D	(United States) Martina Navratilova (United States) Pam Shriver; 7–5, 6–3	(United States) Kathy Jordan (United States) Anne Smith	(United States) Kiyomura / (United Kingdom) Barker (United States) Allen / (Socialist Federal Republic of Yugoslavia) Jaušovec	(United States) Piatek / (United States) White (United States) King / (South Africa) Kloss (United States) Casals / (Australia) Turnbull (United States) Potter / (United States) Walsh
19 Apr	Murjani WTA Championships; Amelia Island, United States; Toyota Series (Category 7); Clay – $250,000 – 56S/32D	(United States) Chris Evert-Lloyd; 6–3, 6–1	(United States) Andrea Jaeger	(West Germany) Bettina Bunge (United States) Kathleen Horvath	(Argentina) Ivanna Madruga-Osses (United States) Pam Casale (France) Catherine Tanvier (United States) Kathy Rinaldi
19 Apr	Murjani WTA Championships; Amelia Island, United States; Toyota Series (Category 7); Clay – $250,000 – 56S/32D	(United States) Leslie Allen (Socialist Federal Republic of Yugoslavia) Mima Jaušovec; 6–1, 7–5	(United States) Barbara Potter (United States) Sharon Walsh	(West Germany) Bettina Bunge (United States) Kathleen Horvath	(Argentina) Ivanna Madruga-Osses (United States) Pam Casale (France) Catherine Tanvier (United States) Kathy Rinaldi
26 Apr	United Airlines Tournament of Champions; Orlando, United States; Toyota Series (Category 7); Clay – $200,000 – 22S/8D	(United States) Martina Navratilova; 6–2, 7–5	(Australia) Wendy Turnbull	(Socialist Federal Republic of Yugoslavia) Mima Jaušovec (United States) Andrea Jaeger	(Brazil) Patricia Medrado (United States) Barbara Potter (United States) Pam Shriver (United States) Lisa Bonder
26 Apr	United Airlines Tournament of Champions; Orlando, United States; Toyota Series (Category 7); Clay – $200,000 – 22S/8D	(United States) Rosie Casals (Australia) Wendy Turnbull; 6–3, 6–3	(United States) Kathy Jordan (United States) Anne Smith	(Socialist Federal Republic of Yugoslavia) Mima Jaušovec (United States) Andrea Jaeger	(Brazil) Patricia Medrado (United States) Barbara Potter (United States) Pam Shriver (United States) Lisa Bonder
26 Apr	Torneo Citta di Arzachena; Arzachena, Italy; Toyota Series (Category 1); Clay – $50,000 – 22S/8D	(Australia) Elizabeth Smylie; 6–2, 7–5	(United States) Dana Gilbert		
26 Apr	Torneo Citta di Arzachena; Arzachena, Italy; Toyota Series (Category 1); Clay – $50,000 – 22S/8D	(United Kingdom) Debbie Jevans (United Kingdom) Liz Jones; 7–6, 6–2	(Sweden) Catrin Jexell (Argentina) Susana Villaverde		

=== May ===
Week	Tournament	Champions	Runners-up	Semifinalists	Quarterfinalists
3 May	Italian Open; Perugia, Italy; Toyota Series (Category 5); Clay – $150,000 – 56S/32D	(United States) Chris Evert-Lloyd; 6–0, 6–2	(Czechoslovakia) Hana Mandlíková	(United States) Lisa Bonder (United States) Billie Jean King	(United States) Bonnie Gadusek (South Africa) Yvonne Vermaak (West Germany) Sylvia Hanika (United States) Pam Casale
3 May	Italian Open; Perugia, Italy; Toyota Series (Category 5); Clay – $150,000 – 56S/32D	(United States) Kathleen Horvath (South Africa) Yvonne Vermaak; 2–6, 6–4, 7–6	(United States) Billie Jean King (South Africa) Ilana Kloss	(United States) Lisa Bonder (United States) Billie Jean King	(United States) Bonnie Gadusek (South Africa) Yvonne Vermaak (West Germany) Sylvia Hanika (United States) Pam Casale
10 May	Toyota Swiss Open; Lugano, Switzerland; Toyota Series (Category 3); Clay – $100,000 – 56S/32D	(United States) Chris Evert-Lloyd; 6–0, 6–3	(Hungary) Andrea Temesvári	(Romania) Virginia Ruzici (South Africa) Yvonne Vermaak	(Czechoslovakia) Helena Suková (Netherlands) Marcella Mesker (Brazil) Patricia Medrado (West Germany) Sylvia Hanika
10 May	Toyota Swiss Open; Lugano, Switzerland; Toyota Series (Category 3); Clay – $100,000 – 56S/32D	(United States) Candy Reynolds (United States) Paula Smith; 6–2, 6–4	(United States) Jennifer Russell (Romania) Virginia Ruzici	(Romania) Virginia Ruzici (South Africa) Yvonne Vermaak	(Czechoslovakia) Helena Suková (Netherlands) Marcella Mesker (Brazil) Patricia Medrado (West Germany) Sylvia Hanika
17 May	German Open; West Berlin, West Germany; Toyota Series (Category 5); Clay – $150,000 – 56S/29D; Singles – Doubles	(West Germany) Bettina Bunge; 6–2, 6–2	(United States) Kathy Rinaldi	(United States) Bonnie Gadusek (West Germany) Sylvia Hanika	(Czechoslovakia) Hana Mandlíková (South Korea) Lee Duk-hee (Socialist Federal Republic of Yugoslavia) Mima Jaušovec (United States) Andrea Leand
17 May	German Open; West Berlin, West Germany; Toyota Series (Category 5); Clay – $150,000 – 56S/29D; Singles – Doubles	(South Africa) Liz Gordon (South Africa) Beverly Mould; 6–3, 6–4	(West Germany) Bettina Bunge (West Germany) Claudia Kohde-Kilsch	(United States) Bonnie Gadusek (West Germany) Sylvia Hanika	(Czechoslovakia) Hana Mandlíková (South Korea) Lee Duk-hee (Socialist Federal Republic of Yugoslavia) Mima Jaušovec (United States) Andrea Leand
24 May; 31 May	French Open; Paris, France; Grand Slam; Clay – $350,000 – 112S/64Q/48D/32X; Singles – Doubles – Mixed doubles	(United States) Martina Navratilova; 7–6^{(8–6)}, 6–1	(United States) Andrea Jaeger	(United States) Chris Evert-Lloyd (Czechoslovakia) Hana Mandlíková	(Romania) Lucia Romanov (Romania) Virginia Ruzici (United States) Tracy Austin (United States) Zina Garrison
24 May; 31 May	French Open; Paris, France; Grand Slam; Clay – $350,000 – 112S/64Q/48D/32X; Singles – Doubles – Mixed doubles	(United States) Martina Navratilova (United States) Anne Smith; 6–3, 6–4	(United States) Rosemary Casals (Australia) Wendy Turnbull	(United States) Chris Evert-Lloyd (Czechoslovakia) Hana Mandlíková	(Romania) Lucia Romanov (Romania) Virginia Ruzici (United States) Tracy Austin (United States) Zina Garrison
24 May; 31 May	French Open; Paris, France; Grand Slam; Clay – $350,000 – 112S/64Q/48D/32X; Singles – Doubles – Mixed doubles	(Australia) Wendy Turnbull (United Kingdom) John Lloyd; 6–2, 7–6	(Brazil) Cláudia Monteiro (Brazil) Cássio Motta	(United States) Chris Evert-Lloyd (Czechoslovakia) Hana Mandlíková	(Romania) Lucia Romanov (Romania) Virginia Ruzici (United States) Tracy Austin (United States) Zina Garrison

=== June ===
Week	Tournament	Champions	Runners-up	Semifinalists	Quarterfinalists
7 Jun	Edgbaston Cup; Birmingham, Great Britain; Toyota Series (Category 3); Grass – $100,000 – 56S/32D; Singles	(United States) Billie Jean King; 6–2, 6–1	(South Africa) Rosalyn Fairbank	(United States) Ann Kiyomura (United States) Betsy Nagelsen	(Netherlands) Betty Stöve (United Kingdom) Jo Durie (United States) Leslie Allen (United States) Nancy Yeargin
7 Jun	Edgbaston Cup; Birmingham, Great Britain; Toyota Series (Category 3); Grass – $100,000 – 56S/32D; Singles	(United Kingdom) Jo Durie (United Kingdom) Anne Hobbs; 6–3, 6–2	(United States) Rosie Casals (Australia) Wendy Turnbull	(United States) Ann Kiyomura (United States) Betsy Nagelsen	(Netherlands) Betty Stöve (United Kingdom) Jo Durie (United States) Leslie Allen (United States) Nancy Yeargin
14 Jun	BMW Championships; Eastbourne, Great Britain; Toyota Series (Category 5); Grass – $150,000 – 64S/32D	(United States) Martina Navratilova; 6–4, 6–3	(Czechoslovakia) Hana Mandlíková	(United Kingdom) Jo Durie (West Germany) Bettina Bunge	(United States) Barbara Potter (Netherlands) Betty Stöve (United States) Zina Garrison (United States) Andrea Jaeger
14 Jun	BMW Championships; Eastbourne, Great Britain; Toyota Series (Category 5); Grass – $150,000 – 64S/32D	(United States) Martina Navratilova (United States) Pam Shriver; 6–3, 6–4	(United States) Kathy Jordan (United States) Anne Smith	(United Kingdom) Jo Durie (West Germany) Bettina Bunge	(United States) Barbara Potter (Netherlands) Betty Stöve (United States) Zina Garrison (United States) Andrea Jaeger
21 Jun; 28 Jun	Wimbledon Championships; London, Great Britain; Grand Slam; Grass – $670,000 – 112S/64Q/48D/48X; Singles – Doubles – Mixed doubles	(United States) Martina Navratilova; 6–1, 3–6, 6–2	(United States) Chris Evert-Lloyd	(West Germany) Bettina Bunge (United States) Billie Jean King	(United States) JoAnne Russell (United States) Anne Smith (United States) Tracy Austin (United States) Barbara Potter
21 Jun; 28 Jun	Wimbledon Championships; London, Great Britain; Grand Slam; Grass – $670,000 – 112S/64Q/48D/48X; Singles – Doubles – Mixed doubles	(United States) Martina Navratilova (United States) Pam Shriver; 6–4, 6–1	(United States) Kathy Jordan (United States) Anne Smith	(West Germany) Bettina Bunge (United States) Billie Jean King	(United States) JoAnne Russell (United States) Anne Smith (United States) Tracy Austin (United States) Barbara Potter
21 Jun; 28 Jun	Wimbledon Championships; London, Great Britain; Grand Slam; Grass – $670,000 – 112S/64Q/48D/48X; Singles – Doubles – Mixed doubles	(United States) Anne Smith (South Africa) Kevin Curren; 2–6, 6–3, 7–5	(Australia) Wendy Turnbull (United Kingdom) John Lloyd	(West Germany) Bettina Bunge (United States) Billie Jean King	(United States) JoAnne Russell (United States) Anne Smith (United States) Tracy Austin (United States) Barbara Potter

=== July ===
Week	Tournament	Champions	Runners-up	Semifinalists	Quarterfinalists
5 Jul	Casino Cup; Hamburg, West Germany; Toyota Series (Category 1); Clay – $50,000 – 32S/16D	(United States) Lisa Bonder; 6–3, 6–2	(Czechoslovakia) Renáta Tomanová	(Bulgaria) Manuela Maleeva (Brazil) Cláudia Monteiro	(United States) Kathrin Keil (Czechoslovakia) Lea Plchová (Switzerland) Lilian Drescher (Czechoslovakia) Marcela Skuherská
5 Jul	Casino Cup; Hamburg, West Germany; Toyota Series (Category 1); Clay – $50,000 – 32S/16D	(Sweden) Elisabeth Ekblom (Sweden) Lena Sandin; 7–6, 6–3	(Brazil) Patricia Medrado (Brazil) Cláudia Monteiro	(Bulgaria) Manuela Maleeva (Brazil) Cláudia Monteiro	(United States) Kathrin Keil (Czechoslovakia) Lea Plchová (Switzerland) Lilian Drescher (Czechoslovakia) Marcela Skuherská
12 Jul	Kim Cup; Roquebrune-Cap-Martin, France; Toyota Series (Category 1); Clay – $50,000 – 32S/16D	(Romania) Virginia Ruzici; 6–2, 7–6^{(7–5)}	(United States) Bonnie Gadusek	(West Germany) Sylvia Hanika (Brazil) Patricia Medrado	(France) Catherine Tanvier (United States) Lisa Bonder (United Kingdom) Sue Barker (Hungary) Andrea Temesvári
12 Jul	Kim Cup; Roquebrune-Cap-Martin, France; Toyota Series (Category 1); Clay – $50,000 – 32S/16D	(Romania) Virginia Ruzici (France) Catherine Tanvier; 7–6, 6–2	(Brazil) Patricia Medrado (Brazil) Cláudia Monteiro	(West Germany) Sylvia Hanika (Brazil) Patricia Medrado	(France) Catherine Tanvier (United States) Lisa Bonder (United Kingdom) Sue Barker (Hungary) Andrea Temesvári
19 Jul	Federation Cup; Santa Clara, California, United States; Team event Hard	United States; 3–0	West Germany	Czechoslovakia; Australia	Brazil; Great Britain; Switzerland; Soviet Union
19 Jul	Head Cup; Kitzbühel, Austria; Toyota Series (Category 1); Clay – $50,000 – 32S/16D	(Romania) Virginia Ruzici; 6–2, 6–2	(Czechoslovakia) Lea Plchová	(Austria) Petra Huber (Czechoslovakia) Kateřina Böhmová	(West Germany) Sylvia Hanika (Czechoslovakia) Michaela Pazderová (Hungary) Marie Pinterová (Greece) Angeliki Kanellopoulou
19 Jul	Head Cup; Kitzbühel, Austria; Toyota Series (Category 1); Clay – $50,000 – 32S/16D	(Czechoslovakia) Yvona Brzáková (Czechoslovakia) Kateřina Böhmová; 6–1, 7–5	(United States) Jill Patterson (United States) Courtney Lord	(Austria) Petra Huber (Czechoslovakia) Kateřina Böhmová	(West Germany) Sylvia Hanika (Czechoslovakia) Michaela Pazderová (Hungary) Marie Pinterová (Greece) Angeliki Kanellopoulou
26 Jul	Wells Fargo Open; San Diego, United States; Toyota Series (Category 4); Hard – $125,000- 32S/16D; Singles – Doubles	(United States) Tracy Austin; 7–6^{(7–5)}, 6–3	(United States) Kathy Rinaldi	(United States) Kathy Jordan (France) Corinne Vanier	(United States) Kate Latham (United States) Leslie Allen (United States) Bonnie Gadusek (United States) Alycia Moulton
26 Jul	Wells Fargo Open; San Diego, United States; Toyota Series (Category 4); Hard – $125,000- 32S/16D; Singles – Doubles	(United States) Kathy Jordan (United States) Paula Smith; 6–3, 5–7, 7–6^{(7–3)}	(Brazil) Patricia Medrado (Brazil) Cláudia Monteiro	(United States) Kathy Jordan (France) Corinne Vanier	(United States) Kate Latham (United States) Leslie Allen (United States) Bonnie Gadusek (United States) Alycia Moulton

=== August ===
Week	Tournament	Champions	Runners-up	Semifinalists	Quarterfinalists
2 Aug	U.S. Clay Court Championships; Indianapolis, United States; Toyota Series (Category 7); Clay – $200,000 – 56S/32D; Singles – Doubles	(Romania) Virginia Ruzici; 6–2, 6–0	(Czechoslovakia) Helena Suková	(United States) Bonnie Gadusek (United States) Kathy Rinaldi	(United States) Michelle Torres (South Korea) Lee Duk-hee (Australia) Dianne Fromholtz (United States) Susan Mascarin
2 Aug	U.S. Clay Court Championships; Indianapolis, United States; Toyota Series (Category 7); Clay – $200,000 – 56S/32D; Singles – Doubles	(Argentina) Ivanna Madruga-Osses (France) Catherine Tanvier; 7–5, 7–6^{(7–4)}	(United States) JoAnne Russell (Romania) Virginia Ruzici	(United States) Bonnie Gadusek (United States) Kathy Rinaldi	(United States) Michelle Torres (South Korea) Lee Duk-hee (Australia) Dianne Fromholtz (United States) Susan Mascarin
9 Aug	Toyota Women's Tennis Classic; Atlanta, United States; Toyota Series (Category 5); Hard – $150,000 – 32S/16D	(United States) Chris Evert-Lloyd; 6–3, 6–1	(United States) Susan Mascarin	(United States) Mary Lou Daniels (United States) Dana Gilbert	(South Africa) Yvonne Vermaak (United States) Wendy White (Australia) Dianne Fromholtz (United States) Ann Kiyomura
9 Aug	Toyota Women's Tennis Classic; Atlanta, United States; Toyota Series (Category 5); Hard – $150,000 – 32S/16D	(United States) Kathy Jordan (United States) Betsy Nagelsen; 4–6, 7–6^{(13–11)}, 7–6^{(7–3)}	(United States) Chris Evert-Lloyd (United States) Billie Jean King	(United States) Mary Lou Daniels (United States) Dana Gilbert	(South Africa) Yvonne Vermaak (United States) Wendy White (Australia) Dianne Fromholtz (United States) Ann Kiyomura
16 Aug	Player's Canadian Open; Montreal, Canada; Toyota Series (Category 7); Hard – $200,000 – 56S/32D	(United States) Martina Navratilova; 6–3, 7–5	(United States) Andrea Jaeger	(Czechoslovakia) Hana Mandlíková (Italy) Sabina Simmonds	(Czechoslovakia) Iva Budařová (Romania) Virginia Ruzici (Czechoslovakia) Helena Suková (West Germany) Eva Pfaff
16 Aug	Player's Canadian Open; Montreal, Canada; Toyota Series (Category 7); Hard – $200,000 – 56S/32D	(United States) Martina Navratilova (United States) Candy Reynolds; 6–4, 6–4	(United States) Barbara Potter (United States) Sharon Walsh	(Czechoslovakia) Hana Mandlíková (Italy) Sabina Simmonds	(Czechoslovakia) Iva Budařová (Romania) Virginia Ruzici (Czechoslovakia) Helena Suková (West Germany) Eva Pfaff
23 Aug	Volvo Women's Cup; Mahwah, United States; Toyota Series (Category 3); Hard – $100,000 – 56S/32D	(United States) Leigh-Anne Thompson; 7–6^{(7–4)}, 6–3	(West Germany) Bettina Bunge	(United States) Wendy White (West Germany) Claudia Kohde-Kilsch	(Czechoslovakia) Iva Budařová (South Africa) Jennifer Mundel (United States) Pam Shriver (United States) Kathy Jordan
23 Aug	Volvo Women's Cup; Mahwah, United States; Toyota Series (Category 3); Hard – $100,000 – 56S/32D	(United States) Barbara Potter (United States) Sharon Walsh; 6–1, 6–4	(United States) Rosie Casals (Australia) Wendy Turnbull	(United States) Wendy White (West Germany) Claudia Kohde-Kilsch	(Czechoslovakia) Iva Budařová (South Africa) Jennifer Mundel (United States) Pam Shriver (United States) Kathy Jordan
30 Aug; 6 Sep	US Open; New York City, United States; Grand Slam; Hard – $850,000 – 128S/64Q/64D/32X; Singles – Doubles – Mixed doubles	(United States) Chris Evert-Lloyd; 6–3, 6–1	(Czechoslovakia) Hana Mandlíková	(United States) Pam Shriver (United States) Andrea Jaeger	(United States) Martina Navratilova (United States) Tracy Austin (United States) Gretchen Rush (United States) Bonnie Gadusek
30 Aug; 6 Sep	US Open; New York City, United States; Grand Slam; Hard – $850,000 – 128S/64Q/64D/32X; Singles – Doubles – Mixed doubles	(United States) Rosie Casals (Australia) Wendy Turnbull; 6–4, 6–3	(United States) Barbara Potter (United States) Sharon Walsh	(United States) Pam Shriver (United States) Andrea Jaeger	(United States) Martina Navratilova (United States) Tracy Austin (United States) Gretchen Rush (United States) Bonnie Gadusek
30 Aug; 6 Sep	US Open; New York City, United States; Grand Slam; Hard – $850,000 – 128S/64Q/64D/32X; Singles – Doubles – Mixed doubles	(United States) Anne Smith (South Africa) Kevin Curren; 6–7, 7–6^{(7–4)}, 7–6^{(7–5)}	(United States) Barbara Potter (United States) Ferdi Taygan	(United States) Pam Shriver (United States) Andrea Jaeger	(United States) Martina Navratilova (United States) Tracy Austin (United States) Gretchen Rush (United States) Bonnie Gadusek

=== September ===
Week	Tournament	Champions	Runners-up	Semifinalists	Quarterfinalists
13 Sep	TV Tokyo Open; Tokyo, Japan; Toyota Series (Category 5); Carpet (i) – $150,000 – 16S	(West Germany) Bettina Bunge; 7–6^{(7–4)}, 6–2	(United States) Barbara Potter	(United States) Sandy Collins (Czechoslovakia) Hana Mandlíková	(Australia) Wendy Turnbull (Socialist Federal Republic of Yugoslavia) Mima Jaušovec (United States) Pam Casale (United States) Bonnie Gadusek
27 Sep	U.S. Women's Indoor Championships; Philadelphia, United States; Toyota Series (Category 4); Carpet (i) – $125,000 – 32S/16D	(United States) Barbara Potter; 6–4, 6–2	(United States) Pam Shriver	(United States) Tracy Austin (Australia) Wendy Turnbull	(United States) Camille Benjamin (United States) Susan Mascarin (Socialist Federal Republic of Yugoslavia) Mima Jaušovec (United States) Wendy White
27 Sep	U.S. Women's Indoor Championships; Philadelphia, United States; Toyota Series (Category 4); Carpet (i) – $125,000 – 32S/16D	(United States) Rosie Casals (Australia) Wendy Turnbull; 3–6, 7–6^{(7–5)}, 6–4	(United States) Barbara Potter (United States) Sharon Walsh	(United States) Tracy Austin (Australia) Wendy Turnbull	(United States) Camille Benjamin (United States) Susan Mascarin (Socialist Federal Republic of Yugoslavia) Mima Jaušovec (United States) Wendy White

=== October ===
Week	Tournament	Champions	Runners-up	Semifinalists	Quarterfinalists
4 Oct	Lynda Carter Maybelline Classic; Deerfield Beach, United States; Toyota Series (Category 4); Hard – $125,000 – 32S/16D	(United States) Chris Evert-Lloyd; 6–1, 6–1	(United States) Andrea Jaeger	(United States) Andrea Leand (United States) Pam Shriver	(United Kingdom) Virginia Wade (Romania) Virginia Ruzici (United States) Barbara Hallquist (United States) Barbara Potter
4 Oct	Lynda Carter Maybelline Classic; Deerfield Beach, United States; Toyota Series (Category 4); Hard – $125,000 – 32S/16D	(United States) Barbara Potter (United States) Sharon Walsh; 7–6^{(7–5)}, 7–6^{(7–3)}	(United States) Rosie Casals (Australia) Wendy Turnbull	(United States) Andrea Leand (United States) Pam Shriver	(United Kingdom) Virginia Wade (Romania) Virginia Ruzici (United States) Barbara Hallquist (United States) Barbara Potter
11 Oct	Borden Classic; Tokyo, Japan; Toyota Series (Category 1); Hard – $50,000 – 32S/16D	(United States) Lisa Bonder; 2–6, 6–0, 6–3	(United States) Shelley Solomon	(United States) Phyllis Blackwell (Peru) Laura Arraya	(Canada) Angela Walker (United States) Barbie Bramblett (United States) Kate Latham (United States) Laura duPont
11 Oct	Borden Classic; Tokyo, Japan; Toyota Series (Category 1); Hard – $50,000 – 32S/16D	(Japan) Naoko Sato (Australia) Brenda Remilton; 2–6, 6–3, 6–3	(United States) Laura duPont (United States) Barbara Jordan	(United States) Phyllis Blackwell (Peru) Laura Arraya	(Canada) Angela Walker (United States) Barbie Bramblett (United States) Kate Latham (United States) Laura duPont
11 Oct	Florida Federal Open; Tampa, Florida, United States; Toyota Series (Category 4); Hard – $125,000 – 32S/16D	(United States) Chris Evert-Lloyd; 3–6, 6–1, 6–4	(United States) Andrea Jaeger	(United States) Andrea Leand (United States) Beth Herr	(Romania) Virginia Ruzici (West Germany) Sylvia Hanika (United States) Camille Benjamin (United States) Zina Garrison
11 Oct	Florida Federal Open; Tampa, Florida, United States; Toyota Series (Category 4); Hard – $125,000 – 32S/16D	(United States) Ann Kiyomura (United States) Paula Smith; 6–2, 6–4	(United States) Mary Lou Piatek (United States) Wendy White	(United States) Andrea Leand (United States) Beth Herr	(Romania) Virginia Ruzici (West Germany) Sylvia Hanika (United States) Camille Benjamin (United States) Zina Garrison
18 Oct	Porsche Tennis Grand Prix; Stuttgart, West Germany; Toyota Series (Category 4); Hard (i) – $125,000 – 32S/16D; Singles – Doubles	(United States) Martina Navratilova; 6–3, 6–3	(United States) Tracy Austin	(Socialist Federal Republic of Yugoslavia) Mima Jaušovec (West Germany) Sylvia Hanika	(Brazil) Pat Medrado (United Kingdom) Jo Durie (United States) Pam Shriver (Czechoslovakia) Helena Suková
18 Oct	Porsche Tennis Grand Prix; Stuttgart, West Germany; Toyota Series (Category 4); Hard (i) – $125,000 – 32S/16D; Singles – Doubles	(United States) Martina Navratilova (United States) Pam Shriver; 6–2, 6–3	(United States) Candy Reynolds (United States) Anne Smith	(Socialist Federal Republic of Yugoslavia) Mima Jaušovec (West Germany) Sylvia Hanika	(Brazil) Pat Medrado (United Kingdom) Jo Durie (United States) Pam Shriver (Czechoslovakia) Helena Suková
18 Oct	Japan Open Tennis Championships; Tokyo, Japan; Toyota Series (Category 1); Hard – $50,000 – 32S/16D; Singles – Doubles	(Peru) Laura Arraya; 3–6, 6–4, 6–0	(Peru) Pilar Vásquez	(Australia) Pam Whytcross (United States) Lisa Bonder	(Japan) Etsuko Inoue (Japan) Masako Yanagi (United States) Laura duPont (Sweden) Catrin Jexell
18 Oct	Japan Open Tennis Championships; Tokyo, Japan; Toyota Series (Category 1); Hard – $50,000 – 32S/16D; Singles – Doubles	(United States) Laura duPont (United States) Barbara Jordan; 6–2, 6–7, 6–1	(Japan) Naoko Sato (Australia) Brenda Remilton	(Australia) Pam Whytcross (United States) Lisa Bonder	(Japan) Etsuko Inoue (Japan) Masako Yanagi (United States) Laura duPont (Sweden) Catrin Jexell
25 Oct	Daihatsu Challenge; Brighton, Great Britain; Toyota Series (Category 5); Carpet (i) – $150,000 – 32S/16D	(United States) Martina Navratilova; 6–1, 6–4	(United States) Chris Evert-Lloyd	(United States) Tracy Austin (United States) Pam Shriver	(United States) Barbara Potter (United States) Jennifer Russell (Romania) Virginia Ruzici (United States) Leigh-Anne Thompson
25 Oct	Daihatsu Challenge; Brighton, Great Britain; Toyota Series (Category 5); Carpet (i) – $150,000 – 32S/16D	(United States) Martina Navratilova (United States) Pam Shriver; 2–6, 7–5, 6–4	(United States) Barbara Potter (United States) Sharon Walsh	(United States) Tracy Austin (United States) Pam Shriver	(United States) Barbara Potter (United States) Jennifer Russell (Romania) Virginia Ruzici (United States) Leigh-Anne Thompson

=== November ===
Week	Tournament	Champions	Runners-up	Semifinalists	Quarterfinalists
1 Nov	Seiko Classic; Hong Kong; Toyota Series (Category 1); Hard – $50,000 – 32S/16D	(Sweden) Catrin Jexell; 6–3, 7–5	(United States) Alycia Moulton	(United States) Vicki Nelson-Dunbar (Switzerland) Christiane Jolissaint	(Switzerland) Lilian Drescher (United States) Dana Gilbert (United States) Kim Steinmetz (United States) Phyllis Blackwell
1 Nov	Seiko Classic; Hong Kong; Toyota Series (Category 1); Hard – $50,000 – 32S/16D	(United States) Laura duPont (United States) Alycia Moulton; 6–2, 4–6, 7–5	(South Africa) Jennifer Mundel (South Africa) Yvonne Vermaak	(United States) Vicki Nelson-Dunbar (Switzerland) Christiane Jolissaint	(Switzerland) Lilian Drescher (United States) Dana Gilbert (United States) Kim Steinmetz (United States) Phyllis Blackwell
1 Nov	Wightman Cup; Williamsburg, United States; Hard (i); Team event	United States; 6–1	Great Britain		
15 Nov	National Panasonic Open; Brisbane, Australia; Toyota Series (Category 4); Grass – $150,000 – 56S/32D	(Australia) Wendy Turnbull; 6–3, 6–1	(United States) Pam Shriver	(South Africa) Rosalyn Fairbank (United States) Alycia Moulton	(United States) Tracy Austin (Bulgaria) Manuela Maleeva (Czechoslovakia) Hana Mandlíková (France) Catherine Tanvier
15 Nov	National Panasonic Open; Brisbane, Australia; Toyota Series (Category 4); Grass – $150,000 – 56S/32D	(United States) Billie Jean King (United States) Anne Smith; 6–3, 6–4	(West Germany) Eva Pfaff (West Germany) Claudia Kohde-Kilsch	(South Africa) Rosalyn Fairbank (United States) Alycia Moulton	(United States) Tracy Austin (Bulgaria) Manuela Maleeva (Czechoslovakia) Hana Mandlíková (France) Catherine Tanvier
22 Nov	NSW Building Society Open; Sydney, Australia; Toyota Series (Category 4); Grass – $125,000 – 56S/32D	(United States) Martina Navratilova; 6–0, 3–6, 6–1	(Australia) Evonne Goolagong Cawley	(United States) Pam Shriver (United States) Andrea Jaeger	(United States) Anne Smith (Australia) Wendy Turnbull (West Germany) Eva Pfaff (United States) Billie Jean King
22 Nov	NSW Building Society Open; Sydney, Australia; Toyota Series (Category 4); Grass – $125,000 – 56S/32D	(United States) Martina Navratilova (United States) Pam Shriver; 6–2, 2–6, 7–6	(West Germany) Eva Pfaff (West Germany) Claudia Kohde-Kilsch	(United States) Pam Shriver (United States) Andrea Jaeger	(United States) Anne Smith (Australia) Wendy Turnbull (West Germany) Eva Pfaff (United States) Billie Jean King
29 Nov; 6 Dec	Marlboro Australian Open; Melbourne, Australia; Grand Slam; Grass – $500,000 – 64S/32Q/32D; Singles – Doubles	(United States) Chris Evert-Lloyd; 6–3, 2–6, 6–3	(United States) Martina Navratilova	(United States) Pam Shriver (United States) Zina Garrison	(United Kingdom) Jo Durie (Canada) Carling Bassett-Seguso (Australia) Wendy Turnbull (West Germany) Sylvia Hanika
29 Nov; 6 Dec	Marlboro Australian Open; Melbourne, Australia; Grand Slam; Grass – $500,000 – 64S/32Q/32D; Singles – Doubles	(United States) Martina Navratilova (United States) Pam Shriver; 6–4, 6–2	(West Germany) Eva Pfaff (West Germany) Claudia Kohde-Kilsch	(United States) Pam Shriver (United States) Zina Garrison	(United Kingdom) Jo Durie (Canada) Carling Bassett-Seguso (Australia) Wendy Turnbull (West Germany) Sylvia Hanika

=== December ===
Week	Tournament	Champions	Runners-up	Semifinalists	Quarterfinalists
6 Dec	Central Fidelity Banks International; Richmond, Virginia, United States; Toyota Series (Category 5); Carpet (i) – $150,000 – 32S/16D	(Australia) Wendy Turnbull; 6–7, 6–4, 6–2	(United States) Tracy Austin	(United States) Leigh-Anne Thompson (United States) Jennifer Russell	(United States) Bonnie Gadusek (Romania) Virginia Ruzici (Socialist Federal Republic of Yugoslavia) Mima Jaušovec (United States) Mary Lou Daniels
6 Dec	Central Fidelity Banks International; Richmond, Virginia, United States; Toyota Series (Category 5); Carpet (i) – $150,000 – 32S/16D	(United States) Rosie Casals (United States) Candy Reynolds; 6–3, 6–4	(United States) Jennifer Russell (Romania) Virginia Ruzici	(United States) Leigh-Anne Thompson (United States) Jennifer Russell	(United States) Bonnie Gadusek (Romania) Virginia Ruzici (Socialist Federal Republic of Yugoslavia) Mima Jaušovec (United States) Mary Lou Daniels
13 Dec	Toyota Series Championships; East Rutherford, United States; WTA Championships; Hard (i) – $300,000 – 12S/6D; Singles – Doubles	(United States) Martina Navratilova; 4–6, 6–1, 6–2	(United States) Chris Evert-Lloyd	(Czechoslovakia) Hana Mandlíková (United States) Tracy Austin	(Australia) Wendy Turnbull (United States) Barbara Potter (United States) Andrea Jaeger (United States) Pam Shriver
13 Dec	Toyota Series Championships; East Rutherford, United States; WTA Championships; Hard (i) – $300,000 – 12S/6D; Singles – Doubles	(United States) Martina Navratilova (United States) Pam Shriver; 6–4, 7–5	(United States) Candy Reynolds (United States) Paula Smith	(Czechoslovakia) Hana Mandlíková (United States) Tracy Austin	(Australia) Wendy Turnbull (United States) Barbara Potter (United States) Andrea Jaeger (United States) Pam Shriver

== Rankings ==
Below are the 1982 WTA year-end rankings (December 20, 1982) in singles competition:

Singles Year-end Ranking
No	Player Name	Points	1981	Change
1	Martina Navratilova (USA)	19.165	3	+2
2	Chris Evert-Lloyd (USA)	17.526	1	-1
3	Andrea Jaeger (USA)	12.856	4	+1
4	Tracy Austin (USA)	10.403	2	-2
5	Wendy Turnbull (AUS)	9.783	8	+3
6	Pam Shriver (USA)	9.156	7	+1
7	Hana Mandlíková (TCH)	9.003	5	-2
8	Barbara Potter (USA)	8.699	10	+2
9	Bettina Bunge (FRG)	8.496	9	=
10	Sylvia Hanika (FRG)	8.260	6	-4
11	Virginia Ruzici (ROU)	7.527	12	+1
12	Mima Jaušovec (YUG)	7.097	11	-1
13	Anne Smith (USA)	6.966	16	+3
14	Billie Jean King (USA)	6.974	NR	NR
15	Kathy Rinaldi (USA)	6.593	33	+18
16	Zina Garrison (USA)	6.343	NR	NR
17	Rosalyn Fairbank (RSA)	6.218	43	+26
18	Bonnie Gadusek (USA)	5.956	25	+7
19	Claudia Kohde-Kilsch (FRG)	5.856	20	+1
20	Andrea Leand (USA)	5.677	NR	NR

== See also ==
- 1982 Volvo Grand Prix
- Women's Tennis Association
- International Tennis Federation
