= 1982 WTA German Open – Singles =

Singles
- 1982 WTA German Open

Final
- Champion: (West Germany) Bettina Bunge
- Runner-up: (United States) Kathy Rinaldi
- Score: 6–2, 6–2

Details
- Draw: 56 (8Q)
- Seeds: 16

Events
Singles	Doubles
← 1981 ·	German Open (WTA)	· 1983 →

Regina Maršíková was the defending champion, but did not compete this year.

Bettina Bunge won the title by defeating Kathy Rinaldi 6–2, 6–2 in the final.

== Seeds ==
The top eight seeds received a bye to the second round.

1. (Czechoslovakia) Hana Mandlíková (quarterfinals)
2. (West Germany) Sylvia Hanika (semifinals)
3. (Socialist Federal Republic of Yugoslavia) Mima Jaušovec (quarterfinals)
4. (West Germany) Bettina Bunge (champion)
5. (United States) Andrea Leand (quarterfinals)
6. (United States) Billie Jean King (second round)
7. (United States) Kathy Rinaldi (final)
8. (West Germany) Claudia Kohde-Kilsch (third round)
9. (United States) Sandy Collins (first round)
10. (United States) JoAnne Russell (first round)
11. (n/a)
12. (United States) Kathleen Horvath (third round)
13. (United States) Bonnie Gadusek (semifinals)
14. (United States) Kate Latham (second round)
15. (South Africa) Rosalyn Fairbank (third round)
16. (n/a)

== Draw ==
=== Key ===
- Q = Qualifier
- WC = Wild card
- LL = Lucky loser
- Alt = Alternate
- SE = Special exempt
- PR = Protected ranking
- ITF = ITF entry
- JE = Junior exempt
- w/o = Walkover
- r = Retired
- d = Defaulted
- SR = Special ranking

=== Finals ===
Quarterfinals
1	(Czechoslovakia) Hana Mandlíková	5	3
13	(United States) Bonnie Gadusek	7	6
4	(West Germany) Bettina Bunge	6	6
(South Korea) Lee Duk-hee	0	1
7	(United States) Kathy Rinaldi	4	6	7
3	(Socialist Federal Republic of Yugoslavia) Mima Jaušovec	6	3	5
5	(United States) Andrea Leand	2	5
2	(West Germany) Sylvia Hanika	6	7

Semifinals
13	(United States) Bonnie Gadusek	6	3
4	(West Germany) Bettina Bunge	7	6
7	(United States) Kathy Rinaldi	6	7
2	(West Germany) Sylvia Hanika	3	5

Final
4	(West Germany) Bettina Bunge	6	6
7	(United States) Kathy Rinaldi	2	2

=== Top half ===
==== Section 1 ====
First round
(Australia) B Remilton	6	5	4
(Romania) L Romanov	4	7	6
(South Africa) Y Vermaak	6	6
(United Kingdom) D Jevans	1	1
(Brazil) P Medrado	6	5	6
9	(United States) S Collins	2	7	2
13	(United States) B Gadusek	6	6
(United States) K Sands	1	1
(Australia) A Minter	6	4	6
Q	(United States) D Gilbert	2	6	2
(Netherlands) M Mesker	6	6	6
(Netherlands) M van der Torre	7	3	0

Second round
1	(Czechoslovakia) H Mandlíková	6	6
(Romania) L Romanov	3	2
(South Africa) Y Vermaak	6	6
(Brazil) P Medrado	3	4
13	(United States) B Gadusek	6	6
(Australia) A Minter	3	2
(Netherlands) M Mesker	7	1	2
8	(West Germany) C Kohde-Kilsch	5	6	6

Third round
1	(Czechoslovakia) H Mandlíková	6	3	7
(South Africa) Y Vermaak	4	6	5
13	(United States) B Gadusek	6	6
8	(West Germany) C Kohde-Kilsch	2	1

Quarterfinals
1	(Czechoslovakia) H Mandlíková	5	3
13	(United States) B Gadusek	7	6

==== Section 2 ====
First round
(United States) L Forood	6	1
(Czechoslovakia) I Budařová	7	6
(United States) LA Thompson	4	0
(Netherlands) B Stöve	6	6
Q	(Sweden) B Björk	1	0
12	(United States) K Horvath	6	6
(Peru) L Arraya	6	6
(United States) T Lewis	1	3
(United Kingdom) J Durie	6	6
(Italy) B Rossi	2	3
Q	(South Africa) L Gordon	3	0
(South Korea) D-h Lee	6	6

Second round
4	(West Germany) B Bunge	6	6
(Czechoslovakia) I Budařová	1	2
(Netherlands) B Stöve	0	2
12	(United States) K Horvath	6	6
(Peru) L Arraya	4	4
(United Kingdom) J Durie	6	6
(South Korea) D-h Lee	2	6	6
6	(United States) BJ King	6	3	2

Third round
4	(West Germany) B Bunge	7	7
12	(United States) K Horvath	6	5
(United Kingdom) J Durie	6	3	5
(South Korea) D-h Lee	2	6	7

Quarterfinals
4	(West Germany) B Bunge	6	6
(South Korea) D-h Lee	0	1

=== Bottom half ===
==== Section 3 ====
First round
(West Germany) I Riedel-Kühn	5	0
(Hungary) M Pinterová	7	6
(Switzerland) H Strachoňová	6	2	6
(United States) S Margolin	3	6	1
(Switzerland) C Pasquale	5	4
15	(South Africa) R Fairbank	7	6
Q	(United States) K Steinmetz	7	7
(United States) S McInerney	5	6
Q	(South Africa) B Mould	6	6
(Peru) P Vásquez	2	3
(United States) N Neviaser	7	6
(West Germany) H Lütten	5	1

Second round
7	(United States) K Rinaldi	6	6
(Hungary) M Pinterová	0	0
(Switzerland) H Strachoňová	7	2	3
15	(South Africa) R Fairbank	5	6	6
Q	(United States) K Steinmetz	6	4
Q	(South Africa) B Mould	7	6
(United States) N Neviaser	6	2
3	(Socialist Federal Republic of Yugoslavia) M Jaušovec	7	6

Third round
7	(United States) K Rinaldi	6	6
15	(South Africa) R Fairbank	0	4
Q	(South Africa) B Mould	3	2
3	(Socialist Federal Republic of Yugoslavia) M Jaušovec	6	6

Quarterfinals
7	(United States) K Rinaldi	4	6	7
3	(Socialist Federal Republic of Yugoslavia) M Jaušovec	6	3	5

==== Section 4 ====
First round
Q	(Sweden) C Lindqvist	4	2
(United States) J Harrington	6	6
(Switzerland) P Delhees	4	2
(West Germany) E Pfaff	6	6
(Sweden) L Sandin	2	6	6
10	(United States) J Russell	6	4	4
14	(United States) K Latham	7	6
Q	(Sweden) E Ekblom	6	2
(South Africa) S Rollinson	2	6	6
(Czechoslovakia) K Skronská	6	3	1
(West Germany) R Tomanová	6	6
Q	(Czechoslovakia) L Plchová	0	1

Second round
5	(United States) A Leand	6	7
(United States) J Harrington	1	5
(West Germany) E Pfaff	4	6	1
(Sweden) L Sandin	6	4	6
14	(United States) K Latham	3	2
(South Africa) S Rollinson	6	6
(West Germany) R Tomanová	2	1
2	(West Germany) S Hanika	6	6

Third round
5	(United States) A Leand	7	6
(Sweden) L Sandin	5	1
(South Africa) S Rollinson	3	2
2	(West Germany) S Hanika	6	6

Quarterfinals
5	(United States) A Leand	2	5
2	(West Germany) S Hanika	6	7
