= 1982 WTA German Open – Doubles =

Doubles
- 1982 WTA German Open

Final
- Champions: (South Africa) Liz Gordon (South Africa) Beverly Mould
- Runners-up: (West Germany) Bettina Bunge (West Germany) Claudia Kohde-Kilsch
- Score: 6–3, 6–4

Details
- Draw: 32 (1Alt)
- Seeds: 8

Events
Singles	Doubles
← 1981 ·	German Open (WTA)	· 1983 →

Rosalyn Fairbank and Tanya Harford were the defending champions, but none competed this year.

Liz Gordon and Beverly Mould won the champion by defeating Bettina Bunge and Claudia Kohde-Kilsch 6–3, 6–4 in the final.

== Seeds ==
1. (n/a)
2. (United States) Candy Reynolds / (United States) Paula Smith (semifinals)
3. (United States) Billie Jean King / (South Africa) Ilana Kloss (second round)
4. (West Germany) Bettina Bunge / (West Germany) Claudia Kohde-Kilsch (final)
5. (United States) Kathleen Horvath / (Czechoslovakia) Hana Mandlíková (quarterfinals)
6. (Socialist Federal Republic of Yugoslavia) Mima Jaušovec / (Netherlands) Betty Stöve (quarterfinals)
7. (United States) Lele Forood / (United States) JoAnne Russell (quarterfinals)
8. (Australia) Brenda Remilton / (South Africa) Yvonne Vermaak (second round)

== Draw ==
=== Key ===
- Q = Qualifier
- WC = Wild card
- LL = Lucky loser
- Alt = Alternate
- SE = Special exempt
- PR = Protected ranking
- ITF = ITF entry
- JE = Junior exempt
- w/o = Walkover
- r = Retired
- d = Defaulted
- SR = Special ranking

=== Finals ===
Semifinals
(South Africa) Liz Gordon (South Africa) Beverly Mould	6	6
(United Kingdom) Jo Durie (United States) Kim Sands	3	2
4	(West Germany) Bettina Bunge (West Germany) Claudia Kohde-Kilsch	6	5	6
2	(United States) Candy Reynolds (United States) Paula Smith	2	7	2

Final
(South Africa) Liz Gordon (South Africa) Beverly Mould	6	6
4	(West Germany) Bettina Bunge (West Germany) Claudia Kohde-Kilsch	3	4

=== Top half ===
First round
Alt	(Sweden) E Ekblom (Sweden) C Lindqvist	6	1	2
(Brazil) P Medrado (Spain) C Perea Alcalá	4	6	6
(South Africa) E Gordon (South Africa) B Mould	6	7
(Romania) L Romanov (Romania) Maria Romanov	1	6
(United States) J Harrington (South Korea) D-h Lee	3	2
(South Africa) J Mundel (South Africa) S Rollinson	6	6
(United States) K Latham (Netherlands) M van der Torre	2	3
7	(United States) L Forood (United States) J Russell	6	6
3	(United States) BJ King (South Africa) I Kloss	6	6
(United States) S Collins (United States) Barbara Lemberg	4	2
(Hungary) M Pinterová (Japan) N Sato	2	6	0
(United Kingdom) J Durie (United States) K Sands	6	3	6
(Peru) L Gildemeister (Switzerland) H Strachoňová	6	2	0
(United States) A Henricksson (Australia) P Whytcross	3	6	6
(Australia) N Gregory (Australia) A Minter	2	5
6	(Socialist Federal Republic of Yugoslavia) M Jaušovec (Netherlands) B Stöve	6	7

Second round
(Brazil) P Medrado (Spain) C Perea Alcalá	3	6
(South Africa) E Gordon (South Africa) B Mould	6	7
(South Africa) J Mundel (South Africa) S Rollinson
7	(United States) L Forood (United States) J Russell	w/o
3	(United States) BJ King (South Africa) I Kloss	6	5	4
(United Kingdom) J Durie (United States) K Sands	2	7	6
(United States) A Henricksson (Australia) P Whytcross	7	1	2
6	(Socialist Federal Republic of Yugoslavia) M Jaušovec (Netherlands) B Stöve	6	6	6

Quarterfinals
(South Africa) E Gordon (South Africa) B Mould	6	6
7	(United States) L Forood (United States) J Russell	3	2
(United Kingdom) J Durie (United States) K Sands	6	7
6	(Socialist Federal Republic of Yugoslavia) M Jaušovec (Netherlands) B Stöve	4	5

Semifinals
(South Africa) E Gordon (South Africa) B Mould	6	6
(United Kingdom) J Durie (United States) K Sands	3	2

=== Bottom half ===
First round
5	(United States) K Horvath (Czechoslovakia) H Mandlíková	6	6
(United Kingdom) D Jevans (Switzerland) I Villiger	4	2
(Australia) E Minter (Australia) B Randall	5	6	3
(United States) N Neviaser (United States) K Steinmetz	7	4	6
(United States) B Bramblett (Italy) B Rossi	0	1
(West Germany) K Ebbinghaus (Peru) P Vásquez	6	6
(West Germany) E Pfaff (West Germany) R Tomanová	2	2
4	(West Germany) B Bunge (West Germany) C Kohde-Kilsch	6	6
8	(Australia) B Remilton (South Africa) Y Vermaak	6	6
(Switzerland) P Delhees (Netherlands) M Mesker	1	0
(United States) B Gadusek (United States) A Leand	7	7
(Czechoslovakia) Y Brzáková (Czechoslovakia) K Skronská	5	6
(United States) S Margolin (United States) LA Thompson	5	0
(West Germany) I Riedel-Kühn (Sweden) L Sandin	7	6
(United States) T Lewis (United States) S McInerney	5	7	3
2	(United States) C Reynolds (United States) P Smith	7	5	6

Second round
5	(United States) K Horvath (Czechoslovakia) H Mandlíková	6	6
(United States) N Neviaser (United States) K Steinmetz	2	3
(West Germany) K Ebbinghaus (Peru) P Vásquez	5	0
4	(West Germany) B Bunge (West Germany) C Kohde-Kilsch	7	6
8	(Australia) B Remilton (South Africa) Y Vermaak	6	2	5
(United States) B Gadusek (United States) A Leand	4	6	7
(West Germany) I Riedel-Kühn (Sweden) L Sandin	0	5
2	(United States) C Reynolds (United States) P Smith	6	7

Quarterfinals
5	(United States) K Horvath (Czechoslovakia) H Mandlíková	0	2
4	(West Germany) B Bunge (West Germany) C Kohde-Kilsch	6	6
(United States) B Gadusek (United States) A Leand	1	2
2	(United States) C Reynolds (United States) P Smith	6	6

Semifinals
4	(West Germany) B Bunge (West Germany) C Kohde-Kilsch	6	5	6
2	(United States) C Reynolds (United States) P Smith	2	7	2
