= 1983 Virginia Slims of California – Singles =

Singles
- 1983 Virginia Slims of California
- 1982 Champion: (United States) Andrea Jaeger

Final
- Champion: (West Germany) Bettina Bunge
- Runner-up: (West Germany) Eva Pfaff
- Score: 6–3, 6–3

Details
- Draw: 32
- Seeds: 8

Events
| Singles | Doubles |
| ← 1982 · | Virginia Slims of California | · 1984 → |

Andrea Jaeger was the defending champion but did not compete that year.

Bettina Bunge won in the final 6–3, 6–3 against Eva Pfaff.

== Seeds ==
A champion seed is indicated in bold text while text in italics indicates the round in which that seed was eliminated.

1. (United States) Tracy Austin (quarterfinals)
2. (United States) Pam Shriver (quarterfinals)
3. (Czechoslovakia) Hana Mandlíková (first round)
4. (Australia) Wendy Turnbull (semifinals)
5. (West Germany) Sylvia Hanika (final)
6. (West Germany) **Bettina Bunge (champion)**
7. (United States) Barbara Potter (first round)
8. (Socialist Federal Republic of Yugoslavia) Mima Jaušovec (first round)

== Draw ==
=== Key ===
- Q = Qualifier
- WC = Wild card
- LL = Lucky loser
- Alt = Alternate
- SE = Special exempt
- PR = Protected ranking
- ITF = ITF entry
- JE = Junior exempt
- w/o = Walkover
- r = Retired
- d = Defaulted
- SR = Special ranking

First round
1 | (United States) **T Austin** | **6** | **6**
(South Africa) Y Vermaak | 3 | 2
(Czechoslovakia) **I Budařová** | **7** | 2 | **3**
(United States) M Louie | 6 | **6** | 2/r
(Hungary) **A Temesvári** | **7** | **6**
(Canada) C Bassett | 5 | 4
(United States) **S Collins** | **6** | 3 | **6**
8 | (Socialist Federal Republic of Yugoslavia) M Jaušovec | 3 | **6** | 2
3 | (Czechoslovakia) H Mandlíková | **6** | 3 | 3
(West Germany) **C Kohde-Kilsch** | 1 | **6** | **6**
(United States) A Kiyomura | 2 | 6
(France) **C Tanvier** | **6** | **7**
(Czechoslovakia) **H Suková** | **7** | **6**
(United States) J Harrington | 5 | 4
(United States) B Gadusek | 3 | 5
6 | (West Germany) **B Bunge** | **6** | **7**
7 | (United States) B Potter | 3 | 6
(United States) **A Smith** | **6** | **7**
(United States) **K Jordan** | **6** | **7**
(West Germany) E Pfaff | 1 | 5
(United States) L Allen | 0 | 1
(United States) **M L Piatek** | **6** | **6**
(United Kingdom) A Hobbs | 5 | 1
4 | (Australia) **W Turnbull** | **7** | **6**
5 | (West Germany) **S Hanika** | **6** | **6**
(Italy) S Simmonds | 2 | 0
(United States) **A White** | **6** | **6**
(United States) G Purdy | 4 | 2
(United States) A Leand | 3 | 2
(United Kingdom) **S Barker** | **6** | **6**
(United Kingdom) J Durie | 4 | 4
2 | (United States) **P Shriver** | **6** | **6**

Second round
1 | (United States) **T Austin** | **6** | **6**
(Czechoslovakia) I Budařová | 1 | 1
(Hungary) **A Temesvári** | **6** | **6**
(United States) S Collins | 2 | 2
(West Germany) **C Kohde-Kilsch** | **6** | 6 | **6**
(France) C Tanvier | 3 | **7** | 4
(Czechoslovakia) H Suková | 1 | 4
6 | (West Germany) **B Bunge** | **6** | **6**
(United States) **A Smith** | **6** | 6 | **6**
(United States) K Jordan | 4 | **7** | 3
(United States) M L Piatek | 5 | **6** | 4
4 | (Australia) **W Turnbull** | **7** | 3 | **6**
5 | (West Germany) **S Hanika** | 2 | **6** | **6**
(United States) A White | **6** | 4 | 3
(United Kingdom) S Barker | **7** | 4 | 2
2 | (United States) **P Shriver** | 6 | **6** | **6**

Quarterfinals
1 | (United States) T Austin | **6** | 5 | 4
(Hungary) **A Temesvári** | 4 | **7** | **6**
(West Germany) C Kohde-Kilsch | 4 | **6** | 1
6 | (West Germany) **B Bunge** | **6** | 3 | **6**
(United States) A Smith | 4 | 2
4 | (Australia) **W Turnbull** | **6** | **6**
5 | (West Germany) **S Hanika** | **6** | 3 | **6**
2 | (United States) P Shriver | 3 | **6** | 3

Semifinals
(Hungary) A Temesvári | 1 | 4
6 | (West Germany) **B Bunge** | **6** | **6**
4 | (Australia) W Turnbull | 0 | **6** | 4
5 | (West Germany) **S Hanika** | **6** | 4 | **6**

Final
6 | (West Germany) **Bettina Bunge** | **6** | **6**
5 | (West Germany) Sylvia Hanika | 3 | 3
