= Rene Uys =

South African tennis player

- Country (sports): South Africa
- Born: 26 July 1964 (age 61) Bloemfontein, South Africa
- Retired: 1985
- Plays: Right-handed
- Prize money: US$ 84,568

Singles
- Career record: 14–19
- Career titles: 5 ITF
- Highest ranking: No. 39 (15 October 1984)

Grand Slam singles results
- French Open: 2R (1984)
- Wimbledon: 4R (1985)
- US Open: 2R (1984)

Doubles
- Career record: 7–14
- Career titles: 2 ITF

Grand Slam doubles results
- French Open: 3R (1984)
- Wimbledon: 2R (1980)
- US Open: 1R (1983, 1984, 1985)

Grand Slam mixed doubles results
- French Open: 2R (1984)
- Wimbledon: 2R (1985)

Rene Uys (born 26 July 1964) is a former South African female tennis player who was active in the first half of the 1980s. She reached a highest singles ranking of No. 39 in October 1984.

== Tennis career ==
Uys was the runner-up at the girls' singles event at the 1981 Wimbledon Championships, losing the final to Zina Garrison in three sets. Her best result at a Grand Slam singles event was reaching the fourth round at the 1985 Wimbledon Championships in which she was defeated in straight sets by first-seeded and eventual champion Martina Navratilova.

In April 1984, she reached the final of the WTA event in Durban, South Africa, followed by a semifinal spot at the South African Open in Johannesburg.

== Career finals ==
=== Singles (1 titles, 1 runners-up) ===
| Outcome | No. | Date | Tournament | Surface | Opponent | Score |
|---|---|---|---|---|---|---|
| Runner-up | 1. | 23 April 1984 | Durban, South Africa | Hard | (United States) Peanut Harper | 1–6, 4–6 |

== ITF finals ==
$10,000 tournaments

=== Singles (5–8) ===
| Outcome | No. | Date | Tournament | Surface | Opponent | Score |
|---|---|---|---|---|---|---|
| Runner-up | 1. | 9 November 1980 | Port Elizabeth, South Africa | Hard | (South Africa) Jennifer Mundel | 6-7, 4-6 |
| Runner-up | 2. | 23 November 1980 | Bloemfontein, South Africa | Hard | (South Africa) Susan Rollinson | 1-6, 6-2, 3-6 |
| Runner-up | 3. | 30 November 1980 | Johannesburg, South Africa | Hard | (United Kingdom) Lesley Charles | 5-7, 4-6 |
| Runner-up | 4. | 10 December 1980 | Cape Town, South Africa | Hard | (South Africa) Liz Gordon | 6-4, 4-6, 4-6 |
| Winner | 5. | 10 December 1980 | East London, South Africa | Hard | (South Africa) Liz Gordon | 6-4, 6-3 |
| Winner | 6. | 9 May 1981 | Chichester, United Kingdom | Clay | (Romania) Florența Mihai | 6–4, 6–3 |
| Winner | 7. | 9 May 1981 | Lee-on-the-Solent, United Kingdom | Clay | (United Kingdom) Lesley Charles | 6-2, 3-6, 6-3 |
| Runner-up | 8. | 1 November 1981 | Port Elizabeth, South Africa | Hard | (South Africa) Yvonne Vermaak | 3-6, 2-6 |
| Winner | 9. | 8 November 1981 | Durban, South Africa | Hard | (South Africa) Beverly Mould | 3-6, 6-1, 6-2 |
| Runner-up | 10. | 1 November 1981 | Bloemfontein, South Africa | Hard | (South Africa) Beverly Mould | 6-7, 2-6 |
| Winner | 11. | 8 December 1981 | Cape Town, South Africa | Hard | (South Africa) Beverly Mould | 6-2 6-3 |
| Runner-up | 12. | 31 January 1983 | Boca Raton, United States | Hard | (Argentina) Emilse Raponi Longo | 4-6, 6-4, 2-6 |
| Runner-up | 13. | 28 April 1985 | Durban, South Africa | Hard | (United States) Marcie Louie | W/O |

=== Doubles (2–0) ===
| Outcome | No | Date | Tournament | Surface | Partner | Opponents in the final | Score |
|---|---|---|---|---|---|---|---|
| Winner | 1. | 30 November 1981 | Johannesburg, South Africa | Hard | (South Africa) Beverly Mould | (South Africa) Ilana Kloss (South Africa) Yvonne Vermaak | 6-4, 1-6, 6-3 |
| Winner | 2. | 23 December 1988 | George, South Africa | Hard | (South Africa) Gail Boon | (South Africa) Janine Burton-Durham (South Africa) Louise Venter | 6-2, 7-6 |
