= 1982 WTA German Open =

- Date: 17–23 May
- Edition: 71st
- Category: Category 3
- Draw: 56S / 32D
- Prize money: $100,000
- Surface: Clay / outdoor
- Location: West Berlin, West Germany
- Venue: Rot-Weiss Tennis Club

Champions

Singles
- (West Germany) Bettina Bunge

Doubles
- (South Africa) Liz Gordon / (South Africa) Beverly Mould
- WTA German Open

The 1982 WTA German Open was a women's tennis tournament played on outdoor clay courts at the Rot-Weiss Tennis Club in West Berlin in West Germany that was part of the Toyota Series Category 3 tier of the 1982 WTA Tour. It was the 71st edition of the tournament and was held from 17 May through 23 May 1982. Fourth-seeded Bettina Bunge won the singles title and earned $18,000 first-prize money.

== Finals ==
=== Singles ===
(West Germany) Bettina Bunge defeated (United States) Kathy Rinaldi 6–2, 6–2

- It was Bunge's 2nd singles title of the year and of her career.

=== Doubles ===
(South Africa) Liz Gordon / (South Africa) Beverly Mould defeated (West Germany) Bettina Bunge / (West Germany) Claudia Kohde-Kilsch 6–3, 6–4

- It was Gordon's only doubles title of her career. It was Mould's only doubles title of the year and the 1st of her career.

== Prize money ==
Event	W	F	SF	QF	Round of 16	Round of 32	Round of 64
Singles	$18,000	$9,000	$4,650	$2,200	$1,100	$550	$275
