= 1983 Virginia Slims of California – Doubles =

Doubles
- 1983 Virginia Slims of California
- 1982 Champions: (United States) Barbara Potter (United States) Sharon Walsh

Final
- Champions: (West Germany) Claudia Kohde-Kilsch (West Germany) Eva Pfaff
- Runners-up: (United States) Rosemary Casals (Australia) Wendy Turnbull
- Score: 6–4, 4–6, 6–4

Details
- Draw: 16
- Seeds: 4

Events
Singles	Doubles
← 1982 ·	Virginia Slims of California	· 1984 →

Barbara Potter and Sharon Walsh were the defending champions but lost in the semifinals to Claudia Kohde-Kilsch and Eva Pfaff.

Kohde-Kilsch and Pfaff won in the final 6–4, 4–6, 6–4 against Rosemary Casals and Wendy Turnbull.

== Seeds ==
Champion seeds are indicated in bold text while text in italics indicates the round in which those seeds were eliminated.

1. (United States) Kathy Jordan / (United States) Anne Smith (first round)
2. (United States) Barbara Potter / (United States) Sharon Walsh (semifinals)
3. (United States) Rosemary Casals / (Australia) Wendy Turnbull (final)
4. (West Germany) **Claudia Kohde-Kilsch** / (West Germany) **Eva Pfaff (champions)**

== Draw ==
=== Key ===
- Q = Qualifier
- WC = Wild card
- LL = Lucky loser
- Alt = Alternate
- SE = Special exempt
- PR = Protected ranking
- ITF = ITF entry
- JE = Junior exempt
- w/o = Walkover
- r = Retired
- d = Defaulted
- SR = Special ranking

First round
1	(United States) K Jordan (United States) A Smith	**7**	4	4
(United States) **A Kiyomura** (United States) **P Smith**	6	**6**	**6**
(United States) S Collins (United States) M Louie
(Socialist Federal Republic of Yugoslavia) **M Jaušovec** (Hungary) **A Temesvári**	**w/o**
3	(United States) **R Casals** (Australia) **W Turnbull**	**6**	**6**
(Canada) C Bassett (United States) J Harrington	1	2
(Czechoslovakia) I Budařová (Italy) S Simmonds	**6**	0	2
(United Kingdom) **J Durie** (United Kingdom) **A Hobbs**	4	**6**	**6**
(Netherlands) **B Stöve** (United States) **A White**	**6**	**6**
(United States) T Holladay (South Africa) Y Vermaak	4	1
(United States) L Allen (United States) M L Piatek	4	2
4	(West Germany) **C Kohde-Kilsch** (West Germany) **E Pfaff**	**6**	**6**
(Czechoslovakia) **H Suková** (France) **C Tanvier**	**6**	**6**
(United States) E Burgin (United States) B Gadusek	4	3
(West Germany) B Bunge (United States) A Leand	1	**7**	1
2	(United States) **B Potter** (United States) **S Walsh**	**6**	6	**6**

Quarterfinals
(United States) **A Kiyomura** (United States) **P Smith**	4	**6**	**6**
(Socialist Federal Republic of Yugoslavia) M Jaušovec (Hungary) A Temesvári	**6**	1	2
3	(United States) **R Casals** (Australia) **W Turnbull**	**6**	4	**6**
(United Kingdom) J Durie (United Kingdom) A Hobbs	3	**6**	4
(Netherlands) B Stöve (United States) A White	4	4
4	(West Germany) **C Kohde-Kilsch** (West Germany) **E Pfaff**	**6**	**6**
(Czechoslovakia) H Suková (France) C Tanvier	2	6
2	(United States) **B Potter** (United States) **S Walsh**	**6**	**7**

Semifinals
(United States) A Kiyomura (United States) P Smith	5	4
3	(United States) **R Casals** (Australia) **W Turnbull**	**7**	**6**
4	(West Germany) **C Kohde-Kilsch** (West Germany) **E Pfaff**	4	**6**	**7**
2	(United States) B Potter (United States) S Walsh	**6**	3	6

Final
3	(United States) Rosemary Casals (Australia) Wendy Turnbull	4	**6**	4
4	(West Germany) **Claudia Kohde-Kilsch** (West Germany) **Eva Pfaff**	**6**	4	**6**
