= 1982 Casino Cup =

- Date: 5–11 July
- Edition: 1st
- Category: Toyota Series (Category 1)
- Draw: 32S / 16D
- Prize money: $50,000
- Surface: Clay / outdoor
- Location: Hamburg, West Germany

Champions

Singles
- (United States) Lisa Bonder

Doubles
- (Sweden) Elisabeth Ekblom / (Sweden) Lena Sandin
WTA Hamburg	· 1983 →

The 1982 Casino Cup was a women's tennis tournament played on outdoor clay courts in Hittfeld near Hamburg, West Germany that was part of Category 1 of the Toyota Series which was incorporated into the 1982 WTA Tour. It was the inaugural edition of the tournament and was held from 5 July through 11 July 1982. Fourth-seeded Lisa Bonder won the singles title.

== Finals ==
=== Singles ===
(United States) Lisa Bonder defeated (Czechoslovakia) Renáta Tomanová 6–3, 6–2

- It was Bonder's first singles title of her career.

=== Doubles ===
(Sweden) Elisabeth Ekblom / (Sweden) Lena Sandin defeated (Brazil) Patricia Medrado / (Brazil) Cláudia Monteiro 7–6, 6–3

- It was Ekblom's only doubles title of her career. It was Sandin's only doubles title of her career.
