= 1983 Virginia Slims of California =

- Date: February 21 – 27
- Edition: 12th
- Draw: 33S / 16D
- Prize money: $150,000
- Surface: Carpet / indoors
- Location: Oakland, California, U.S.
- Venue: Oakland-Alameda County Coliseum Arena

Champions

Singles
- (West Germany) Bettina Bunge

Doubles
- (West Germany) Claudia Kohde-Kilsch / (West Germany) Eva Pfaff
← 1982 ·	Stanford Classic	· 1984 →

The 1983 Virginia Slims of California was a women's tennis tournament played on indoor carpet courts at the Oakland-Alameda County Coliseum Arena in Oakland, California in the United States that was part of the 1983 Virginia Slims World Championship Series. It was the 12th edition of the tournament and was held from February 21 through February 27, 1983. Sixth-seeded Bettina Bunge won the singles title and earned $30,000 first-prize money.

== Finals ==
=== Singles ===
(West Germany) Bettina Bunge defeated (West Germany) Sylvia Hanika 6–3, 6–3

- It was Bunge's only singles title of the year and the 4th and last of her career.

=== Doubles ===
(West Germany) Claudia Kohde-Kilsch / (West Germany) Eva Pfaff defeated (United States) Rosemary Casals / (Australia) Wendy Turnbull 6–4, 4–6, 6–4

- It was Kohde-Kilsch's 1st title of the year and the 8th of her career. It was Pfaff's only title of the year and the 1st of her career.

== Prize money ==
Event	W	F	SF	QF	Round of 16	Round of 32	Prel. round
Singles	$30,000	$15,000	$7,350	$3,600	$1,900	$1,100	$700
