= 1982 Avon Championships of Cincinnati =

- Date: January 11–17
- Edition: 3rd
- Category: Virginia Slims circuit
- Draw: 33S / 16D
- Prize money: $150,000
- Surface: Carpet / indoor
- Location: Cincinnati, Ohio, U.S.
- Venue: Riverfront Coliseum

Champions

Singles
- (United States) Barbara Potter

Doubles
- (United Kingdom) Sue Barker / (United States) Ann Kiyomura
← 1981 ·	Avon Championships of Cincinnati

The 1982 Avon Championships of Cincinnati was a women's tennis tournament played on indoor carpet courts at the Riverfront Coliseum in Cincinnati, Ohio in the United States that was part of the 1982 Avon Championships Circuit. It was the third, and last, edition of the tournament and was held from January 11 through January 17, 1982. Fifth-seeded Barbara Potter won the singles title and earned $30,000 first-prize money.

== Finals ==
=== Singles ===
(United States) Barbara Potter defeated (West Germany) Bettina Bunge 6–4, 7–6^{(7–3)}

- It was Potter's first singles title of the year and the 2nd of her career.

=== Doubles ===
(United Kingdom) Sue Barker / (United States) Ann Kiyomura defeated (United States) Pam Shriver / (United States) Anne Smith 6–2, 7–6^{(7–5)}

== Prize money ==
Event	W	F	SF	QF	Round of 16	Round of 32	Prel. round
Singles	$30,000	$15,000	$7,350	$3,600	$1,900	$1,100	$700
