= 1982 TV Tokyo Open =

- Date: 13–19 September
- Edition: 10th
- Category: Toyota Series (Category 5)
- Draw: 16S
- Prize money: $150,000
- Surface: Carpet / indoor
- Location: Tokyo, Japan
- Venue: Yoyogi National Gymnasium

Champions

Singles
- (West Germany) Bettina Bunge
- Pan Pacific Open

The 1982 TV Tokyo Open was a women's singles tennis tournament played on indoor carpet courts at Yoyogi National Gymnasium in Tokyo in Japan. The event was part of the Category 5 (Note: Tournaments with prize money for the women of at least $150,000.) of the 1982 Toyota Series. It was the tenth edition of the tournament and was held from 13 September through 19 September 1982. Third-seeded Bettina Bunge won the title and earned $40,000 first-prize money.

== Finals ==
=== Singles ===
(West Germany) Bettina Bunge defeated (United States) Barbara Potter 7–6^{(7–4)}, 6–2

- It was Bunge's 3rd singles title of the year and of her career.

== Prize money ==
Event	W	F	3rd	4th	QF	Round of 16
Singles	$40,000	$22,000	$12,000	$10,000	$5,300	$3,000
