= 1980 Avon Championships of Cincinnati =

- Date: January 7–13
- Edition: 1st
- Category: Virginia Slims circuit
- Draw: 32S / 16D
- Prize money: $150,000
- Surface: Carpet (Sporteze) / indoor
- Location: Cincinnati, Ohio, U.S.
- Venue: Riverfront Coliseum

Champions

Singles
- (United States) Tracy Austin

Doubles
- (United States) Laura DuPont / (United States) Pam Shriver
Avon Championships of Cincinnati	· 1981 →

The 1980 Avon Championships of Cincinnati was a women's tennis tournament played on indoor carpet courts at the Riverfront Coliseum in Cincinnati, Ohio in the United States that was part of the 1980 Avon Championships Circuit. It was the inaugural edition of the tournament and was held from January 7 through January 13, 1980. Second-seeded Tracy Austin won the singles title and earned $30,000 first-prize money.

== Finals ==
=== Singles ===
(United States) Tracy Austin defeated (United States) Chris Evert-Lloyd 6–2, 6–1

- It was Austin's first singles title of the year and the 11th of her career.

=== Doubles ===
(United States) Laura DuPont / (United States) Pam Shriver defeated (Socialist Federal Republic of Yugoslavia) Mima Jaušovec / (United States) Ann Kiyomura 6–3, 6–3

== Prize money ==
Event	W	F	SF	QF	Round of 16	Round of 32
Singles	$30,000	$15,000	$7,000	$3,500	$1,750	$1,000
