= 1981 Avon Championships of Cincinnati =

- Date: January 19–25
- Edition: 2nd
- Category: Virginia Slims circuit
- Draw: 32S / 16D
- Prize money: $150,000
- Surface: Carpet / indoor
- Location: Cincinnati, Ohio, U.S.
- Venue: Riverfront Coliseum

Champions

Singles
- (United States) Martina Navratilova

Doubles
- (United States) Kathy Jordan / (United States) Anne Smith
← 1980 ·	Avon Championships of Cincinnati	· 1982 →

The 1981 Avon Championships of Cincinnati was a women's tennis tournament played on indoor carpet courts at the Riverfront Coliseum in Cincinnati, Ohio in the United States that was part of the 1981 Avon Championships Circuit. It was the second edition of the tournament and was held from January 19 through January 25, 1981. First-seeded Martina Navratilova won the singles title and earned $30,000 first-prize money.

== Finals ==
=== Singles ===
(United States) Martina Navratilova defeated (West Germany) Sylvia Hanika 6–2, 6–4

- It was Navratilova's first singles title of the year and the 46th of her career.

=== Doubles ===
(United States) Kathy Jordan / (United States) Anne Smith defeated (United States) Martina Navratilova / (United States) Pam Shriver 1–6, 6–3, 6–3

== Prize money ==
Event	W	F	SF	QF	Round of 16	Round of 32
Singles	$30,000	$15,000	$7,350	$3,600	$1,900	$1,100
