= 1982 Avon Championships of California =

- Date: February 22–28
- Edition: 11th
- Category: Virginia Slims circuit
- Draw: 33S / 16D
- Prize money: $150,000
- Surface: Carpet (Sporteze) / indoor
- Location: Oakland, California, US
- Venue: Oakland Coliseum Arena

Champions

Singles
- (United States) Andrea Jaeger

Doubles
- (United States) Barbara Potter / (United States) Sharon Walsh
| ← 1981 · | Stanford Classic | · 1983 → |

The 1982 Avon Championships of California, also known as the Avon Championships of Oakland, was a women's tennis tournament played on indoor carpet court at the Oakland Coliseum Arena in Oakland, California in the United States that was part of the 1982 Avon Championships Circuit. It was the 11th edition of the tournament and was held from February 22 through February 28, 1982. Second-seeded Andrea Jaeger won the singles title, her second consecutive at the event, and earned $30,000 first-prize money.

== Finals ==
=== Singles ===
(United States) Andrea Jaeger defeated (United States) Chris Evert 7–6^{(7–5)}, 6–4

- It was Jeager's 2nd singles title of the year and the 9th of her career.

=== Doubles ===
(United States) Barbara Potter / (United States) Sharon Walsh defeated (United States) Kathy Jordan / (United States) Pam Shriver 6–1, 3–6, 7–6^{(7–5)}

== Prize money ==
| Event | W | F | SF | QF | Round of 16 | Round of 32 | Prel. round |
| Singles | $30,000 | $15,000 | $7,350 | $3,600 | $1,900 | $1,100 | $700 |
