= 1982 Avon Championships of Chicago =

Coordinates: 42.0053°N 87.8879°W

- Date: January 25–31
- Edition: 11th
- Category: Virginia Slims circuit
- Draw: 32S / 16D
- Prize money: $150,000
- Surface: Carpet (Sporteze) / indoor
- Location: Chicago, Illinois, US
- Venue: Rosemont Horizon

Champions

Singles
- (United States) Martina Navratilova

Doubles
- (United States) Martina Navratilova / (United States) Pam Shriver
- Virginia Slims of Chicago

The 1982 Avon Championships of Chicago was a women's tennis tournament played on indoor carpet courts at the Rosemont Horizon in Chicago, Illinois in the United States that was part of the 1982 Avon Championships Circuit. It was the 11th edition of the tournament and was held from January 25 through January 31, 1982. First-seeded Martina Navratilova won the singles title and earned $30,000 first-prize money.

== Finals ==
=== Singles ===
(United States) Martina Navratilova defeated (Australia) Wendy Turnbull 6–4, 6–1

- It was Navratilova's 3rd singles title of the year and the 58th of her career.

=== Doubles ===
(United States) Martina Navratilova / (United States) Pam Shriver defeated (United States) Rosie Casals / (Australia) Wendy Turnbull 7–5, 6–4

== Prize money ==
Event	W	F	SF	QF	Round of 16	Round of 32
Singles	$30,000	$15,000	$7,350	$3,600	$1,900	$1,100
