= 1984 South African Open (tennis) =

- Date: 30 April – 6 May (women); 19 – 25 November (men)
- Edition: 81st
- Category: Grand Prix (men)
- Draw: 32S / 16D
- Prize money: $300,000 (men)
- Surface: Hard / outdoor
- Location: Johannesburg, South Africa
- Venue: Ellis Park Tennis Stadium

Champions

Men's singles
- (United States) David Pate

Women's singles
- (United States) Chris Evert

Men's doubles
- (United States) Tracy Delatte / (Paraguay) Francisco Gonzalez

Women's doubles
- (South Africa) Rosalyn Fairbank / (South Africa) Beverly Mould
- South African Open

The 1984 South African Open was a tennis tournament played on indoor hard courts in Johannesburg, South Africa that was part of the 1984 Volvo Grand Prix and the 1984 Virginia Slims World Championship Series. It was the 81st edition of the tournament. The women's tournament was held from 30 April through 6 May 1984 while the men's tournament was held from 19 November through 25 November 1984.

== Finals ==
=== Men's singles ===
(United States) Eliot Teltscher defeated (United States) Vitas Gerulaitis 6–3, 6–1, 7–6

- It was Teltscher's 2nd title of the year and the 13th of his career.

=== Women's singles ===
(United States) Chris Evert defeated (United States) Andrea Jaeger 6–3, 6–0

- It was Evert's 3rd title of the year and the 150th of her career.

=== Men's doubles ===
(United States) Tracy Delatte / (Paraguay) Francisco Gonzalez defeated (United States) Steve Meister / (United States) Eliot Teltscher 7–6, 6–1

- It was Delatte's only title of the year and the 3rd of his career. It was Gonzalez's 2nd title of the year and the 8th of his career.

=== Women's doubles ===
(South Africa) Rosalyn Fairbank / (South Africa) Beverly Mould defeated (United States) Sandy Collins / (United States) Andrea Leand 6–1, 6–2

- It was Fairbank's 1st title of the year and the 10th of her career. It was Mould's 1st title of the year and the 3rd of her career.
