= Lee Duk-hee =

South Korean tennis player (born 1953)

- Full name: Lee Duk-hee (이덕희)
- Country (sports): South Korea
- Born: 13 July 1953 (age 73) North Jeolla Province
- Retired: 1983
- Plays: Right-handed

Singles
- Career record: 62–82
- Career titles: 1 WTA
- Highest ranking: No. 40 (20 December 1982)

Grand Slam singles results
- Australian Open: 2R (1973)
- French Open: 2R (1980, 1982, 1983)
- Wimbledon: 2R (1980, 1981, 1982, 1983)
- US Open: 4R (1981)

Doubles
- Career record: 27–60

Grand Slam doubles results
- Australian Open: 2R (1980)
- French Open: 3R (1983)
- Wimbledon: 2R (1982)
- US Open: 2R (1983)

Lee Duk-hee (born 13 July 1953) is a former professional tennis player from South Korea.

== Biography ==
Lee started in 1973 when she made the second round of the Australian Open, then featured as a doubles player at both the 1973 French Open and Wimbledon Championships. For the rest of the 1970s, she played only representative tennis for South Korea. She was a foundation player in South Korea's Fed Cup team, first featuring in its tournament debut in 1973, with regular appearances from 1976. At the 1974 Asian Games, she partnered with Lee Soon-oh to win a silver medal in the women's doubles. She won two gold medals at the 1978 Asian Games in both the women's singles and doubles.

Relocating to the United States, Lee became the first South Korean of either gender to play professional tennis in 1980. She featured in the singles draw of all four grand slam tournaments in 1980, which was also a first for a Korean. At the 1981 US Open, she lost in the fourth round to Hana Mandlikova after defeating Susan Leo, Susan Mascarin and ninth-seed Virginia Ruzici. In 1982, she defeated Yvonne Vermaak to win the Fort Myers WTA tournament and had a win over Billie Jean King en route to the quarterfinals of the German Open. She reached her career best ranking of 30 in the world in 1982, which was her final year on the professional tour and still holds the highest career ranking for a South Korean tennis player to date.

== WTA Tour finals ==
=== Singles (1-0) ===
Result	W/L	Date	Tournament	Tier	Surface	Opponent	Score
Win	1–0	Jan 1982	Fort Myers, Florida, U.S.	$50,000	Hard	(South Africa) Yvonne Vermaak	6–0, 6–3
