= Avon Championships of Cincinnati =

Defunct tennis tournament
- Event name: Avon Championships of Cincinnati
- Tour: WTA Tour
- Founded: 1980
- Abolished: 1982
- Editions: 3
- Surface: Carpet {i)

The Avon Championships of Cincinnati is a defunct WTA Tour affiliated women's tennis tournament played from 1980 to 1982. It was held in Cincinnati, Ohio in the United States and played on indoor carpet courts.

== Past finals ==
=== Singles ===
Year	Champions	Runners-up	Score
1980	(United States) Tracy Austin	(United States) Chris Evert	6–2, 6–1
1981	(United States) Martina Navratilova	(West Germany) Sylvia Hanika	6–2, 6–4
1982	(United States) Barbara Potter	(West Germany) Bettina Bunge	6–4, 7–6^{(7–3)}

=== Doubles ===
Year	Champions	Runners-up	Score
1980	(United States) Laura DuPont (United States) Pam Shriver	(Socialist Federal Republic of Yugoslavia) Mima Jaušovec (United States) Ann Kiyomura	6–3, 6–3
1981	(United States) Kathy Jordan (United States) Anne Smith	(United States) Martina Navratilova (United States) Pam Shriver	1–6, 6–3, 6–3
1982	(United Kingdom) Sue Barker (United States) Ann Kiyomura	(United States) Pam Shriver (United States) Anne Smith	6–2, 7–6^{(7–5)}
