= Bonnie Gadusek =

American tennis player

- Country (sports): United States
- Residence: Punta Gorda, Florida, U.S.
- Born: September 11, 1963 (age 63) Pittsburgh, Pennsylvania, U.S.
- Turned pro: September 1981
- Retired: April 1987
- Plays: Right-handed (two-handed backhand)
- Prize money: $504,238

Singles
- Career record: 169–95
- Career titles: 5
- Highest ranking: No. 8 (July 9, 1984)

Grand Slam singles results
- Australian Open: 2R (1981)
- French Open: 4R (1985)
- Wimbledon: 2R (1985)
- US Open: QF (1982, 1986)

Doubles
- Career record: 83–71
- Career titles: 3
- Highest ranking: No. 59 (January 5, 1987)

Bonnie Gadusek (born September 11, 1963) is a retired American professional tennis player.

== Career ==
Gadusek started a career in gymnastics, training for the 1980 Olympics, but fell from uneven parallel bars and landed on her neck, dislocating two vertebrae. While recovering from her injuries, she took up tennis as part of her therapy. She played in her first junior tournament wearing a brace. She was named Junior of the Year in 1980 and Player of the Year in 1981 by the Florida Tennis Association. She won the 1981 French Open girls’ singles championship.

Gadusek played on the WTA Tour from 1981 to 1987. She was named Rookie of the Year in 1982. She won five singles and three doubles titles before retiring. The right-hander reached her highest career ranking on July 9, 1984 when she became the world No. 8. Her best Grand Slam finishes were two quarterfinals at the US Open in 1982 and 1986.

Gadusek had career wins over Billie Jean King, Andrea Jaeger, Sue Barker, Hana Mandlíková, Manuela Maleeva, Wendy Turnbull, Gabriela Sabatini, Dianne Fromholtz, Claudia Kohde-Kilsch, Helena Suková, Zina Garrison, Mary Joe Fernandez, Sylvia Hanika, Jo Durie, and Rosie Casals. During her career, she was coached by renowned Australian coach Harry Hopman.

Gadusek was a member of the 1986 Wightman Cup Team. She helped coach the 1987 Wightman Cup Team. She retired with a 169–95 win–loss record.

== WTA career finals ==
=== Singles: 10 (5 titles, 5 runner-ups) ===
Winner — Legend Grand Slam tournaments (0–0) WTA Championships (0–0) Virginia Slims, Avon, other (5–5)	Titles by surface Hard (1–1) Grass (0–0) Clay (2–3) Carpet (2–1)

Result	W/L	Date	Tournament	Surface	Opponent	Score
Loss	0–1	Jul 1982	Tournoi de Monte Carlo, Monaco	Clay	(Romania) Virginia Ruzici	2–6, 6–7^{(5–7)}
Loss	0–2	May 1983	Italian Open	Clay	(Hungary) Andrea Temesvári	1–6, 0–6
Loss	0–3	Nov 1983	Maybelline Classic, U.S.	Hard	(United States) Chris Evert-Lloyd	0–6, 4–6
Win	1–3	Jan 1984	VS Marco Island, U.S.	Clay	(United States) Kathleen Horvath	3–6, 6–0, 6–4
Loss	1–4	Mar 1984	VS Palm Beach Gardens, U.S.	Clay	(United States) Chris Evert-Lloyd	0–6, 1–6
Win	2–4	Jan 1985	VS Marco Island, U.S.	Hard	(United States) Pam Casale	6–3, 6–4
Win	3–4	May 1985	Swiss Open	Clay	(Bulgaria) Manuela Maleeva	6–2, 6–2
Win	4–4	Sep 1985	VS Chicago, U.S.	Carpet (i)	(United States) Kathy Rinaldi	6–1, 6–3
Win	5–4	Oct 1985	VS Indianapolis, U.S.	Carpet (i)	(United States) Pam Casale	6–0, 6–3
Loss	5–5	Dec 1985	Pan Pacific Open, Japan	Carpet (i)	(Bulgaria) Manuela Maleeva	6–7^{(2–7)}, 6–3, 5–7

=== Doubles: 6 (3 titles, 3 runner-ups) ===
Winner — Legend Grand Slam tournaments (0–0) WTA Tour Championships (0–0) Virginia Slims (3–3)	Titles by surface Hard (1–2) Grass (0–0) Clay (1–0) Carpet (1–1)

Result	W/L	Date	Tournament	Surface	Partner	Opponents	Score
Loss	0–1	Oct 1983	Tampa Open, U.S.	Hard	(United States) Wendy White	(United States) Martina Navratilova (United States) Pam Shriver	0–6, 1–6
Win	1–1	Nov 1983	Deerfield Beach Classic, U.S.	Hard	(United States) Wendy White	(United States) Pam Casale (United States) Mary-Lou Piatek	6–1, 3–6, 6–3
Loss	1–2	Jan 1985	Marco Island Cup, U.S.	Hard	(United States) Camille Benjamin	(United States) Kathy Jordan (Australia) Elizabeth Smylie	3–6, 3–6
Win	2–2	May 1985	Lugano Open, Switzerland	Clay	(Czechoslovakia) Helena Suková	(West Germany) Bettina Bunge (West Germany) Eva Pfaff	6–2, 6–4
Win	3–2	Oct 1985	VS Indianapolis, U.S.	Carpet (i)	(United States) Mary-Lou Piatek	(United States) Penny Barg (United States) Sandy Collins	6–1, 6–0
Loss	3–3	Feb 1986	Oakland Classic, U.S.	Carpet (i)	(Czechoslovakia) Helena Suková	(Czechoslovakia) Hana Mandlíková (Australia) Wendy Turnbull	6–7^{(5–7)}, 1–6

== Grand Slam singles performance timeline ==
Key
W	F	SF	QF	#R	RR	Q#	DNQ	A	NH

(W) winner; (F) finalist; (SF) semifinalist; (QF) quarterfinalist; (#R) rounds 4, 3, 2, 1; (RR) round-robin stage; (Q#) qualification round; (DNQ) did not qualify; (A) absent; (NH) not held; (SR) strike rate (events won / competed); (W–L) win–loss record.

Tournament	1981	1982	1983	1984	1985	1986	1987
Australian Open	2R	A	A	A	A	NH	A
French Open	1R	3R	1R	A	4R	A	A
Wimbledon	A	A	A	A	2R	A	A
US Open	A	QF	4R	4R	3R	QF	1R
Year-end ranking	35	18	18	13	10	13	461
