= Lena Sandin =

Swedish tennis player

- Country (sports): Sweden
- Born: 8 June 1961 (age 63); Tyresö, Sweden
- Height: 1.70 m (5 ft 7 in)
- Retired: 1989
- Plays: Right-handed
- Prize money: $88,544

Singles
- Career record: 15–24
- Highest ranking: No. 91 (6 June 1983)

Grand Slam singles results
- French Open: 2R (1981)
- Wimbledon: 2R (1983)
- US Open: 1R (1980, 1982, 1983)

Doubles
- Career record: 28–16
- Career titles: 1 WTA
- Highest ranking: No. 178 (11 April 1988)

Grand Slam doubles results
- French Open: 2R (1981)
- US Open: 1R (1982, 1983)

Lena Sandin (born 8 June 1961) is a former professional tennis player from Sweden.

== Biography ==
Sandin won the girls' singles title at the 1979 French Open, with a win in the final over American Mary-Lou Piatek.

She represented the Sweden Fed Cup team in a total of six ties, the first in 1979. This included the quarter-final loss to Australia in 1980, where she gave Sweden a winning start by beating Dianne Fromholtz in the opening singles rubber.

At the 1980 US Open she took a set off the second seeded Martina Navratilova in a first-round loss.

She won a doubles title at Hamburg in 1982, partnering countrywoman Elisabeth Ekblom.

== WTA Tour finals ==
=== Doubles (1-0) ===
Result	Date	Tournament	Tier	Surface	Partner	Opponents	Score
Win	Jul 1982	Hamburg, West Germany	Category 1	Clay	(Sweden) Elisabeth Ekblom	(Brazil) Patricia Medrado (Brazil) Cláudia Monteiro	7–6, 6–3
