= Elisabeth Ekblom =

Swedish tennis player

- Full name: Elisabeth Ekblom
- Country (sports): Sweden
- Born: 10 February 1958 (age 67)
- Prize money: $53,404

Singles
- Career record: 31–33

Grand Slam singles results
- Australian Open: SF (1976)
- French Open: 2R (1978)
- Wimbledon: 2R (1980)
- US Open: 1R (1978, 1980)

Doubles
- Career record: 21–13
- Career titles: 1

Grand Slam doubles results
- French Open: 1R (1981)
- Wimbledon: 2R (1980)
- US Open: 1R (1980)

Elisabeth Ekblom (born 10 February 1958) is a former professional tennis player from Sweden.

== Biography ==
Ekblom was a semifinalist at the 1976 Australian Open as a 17-year-old. She started her run with a straight sets win over second seed Kerry Reid, then defeated unseeded players Kathleen Harter and Christine Matison. In the semifinal, she was beaten by Czechoslovakia's Renáta Tomanová.

In 1978, she made her Fed Cup debut for Sweden in a first round tie against France. She played other Fed Cup ties in 1981 against Denmark and Czechoslovakia.

Her only title on the WTA Tour came in the doubles at Hamburg in 1982 with Lena Sandin.

== WTA Tour finals ==
=== Doubles (1-0) ===
Result	Date	Tournament	Tier	Surface	Partner	Opponents	Score
Win	July, 1982	Hamburg, West Germany	Category 1	Clay	(Sweden) Lena Sandin	(Brazil) Patricia Medrado (Brazil) Cláudia Monteiro	7–6, 6–3
