= Beverly Mould =

South African tennis player

- Country (sports): South Africa
- Born: 13 March 1962 (age 64) Ladysmith, South Africa
- Height: 1.60 m (5 ft 3 in)
- Plays: Right-handed
- Prize money: $96,335

Singles
- Career record: 6–14
- Career titles: 0
- Highest ranking: No. 46 (24 December 1984)

Grand Slam singles results
- Australian Open: 2R (1984)
- French Open: 3R (1983)
- Wimbledon: 2R (1984)
- US Open: 3R (1984)

Doubles
- Career record: 21–16
- Career titles: 3

Grand Slam doubles results
- French Open: 3R (1985)
- Wimbledon: 3R (1985)
- US Open: 3R (1982)

Grand Slam mixed doubles results
- French Open: 1R (1984)
- Wimbledon: 1R (1984)

Beverly Mould (born 13 March 1962) is a South African former tennis player who was active in the first half of the 1980s.

== Tennis career ==
During her career, Mould won three WTA Tour doubles titles.

Her best singles result at a Grand Slam tournament was reaching the third round at the 1983 French Open and 1984 US Open, losing to Andrea Jaeger (Note: In the second round she defeated 13-year old Steffi Graf, appearing in her first Grand Slam tournament, in straight sets.) and Wendy Turnbull respectively.

Mould achieved a highest singles ranking of No. 46 on 24 December 1984.

== Career finals ==
=== Doubles (3 titles, 3 runner-ups) ===
Result	W/L	Date	Tournament	Surface	Partner	Opponent	Score
Win	1–0	May 1982	German Open	Clay	(South Africa) Elizabeth Gordon	(West Germany) Bettina Bunge (West Germany) Claudia Kohde Kilsch	6–3, 6–4
Loss	1–1	Jun 1983	Edgbaston Cup	Grass	(Australia) Elizabeth Sayers	(United States) Billie Jean King (United States) Sharon Walsh	2–6, 4–6
Win	2–1	May 1984	South African Open	Clay	(South Africa) Rosalyn Fairbank	(United States) Sandy Collins (United States) Andrea Leand	7–5, 7–5
Loss	2–2	Feb 1984	VS of Indianapolis	Carpet (i)	(Australia) Elizabeth Smylie	(Brazil) Cláudia Monteiro (South Africa) Yvonne Vermaak	4–6, 7–6, 5–7
Loss	2–3	Aug 1984	VS of Newport	Grass	(United States) Lea Antonoplis	(United States) Anna-Maria Fernandez (United States) Peanut Louie-Harper	5–7, 6–7
Win	3–3	Aug 1984	U.S. Clay Court Championships	Clay	(United States) Paula Smith	(United States) Elise Burgin (United States) Joanne Russell	6–2, 7–5
