= Liz Gordon (tennis) =

South African tennis player

- Full name: Elizabeth Gordon Ford
- Country (sports): South Africa
- Born: 16 May 1957 (age 69) Pietermaritzburg, South Africa

Singles
- Career titles: 0

Grand Slam singles results
- Australian Open: Q2 (1981)
- Wimbledon: 2R (1981, 1982)
- US Open: Q1 (1982)

Doubles
- Career titles: 1 WTA

Grand Slam doubles results
- French Open: 1R (1982)
- Wimbledon: 2R (1982)

Elizabeth Gordon Ford (born 16 May 1957) is a South African former professional tennis player.

Gordon featured twice in the singles second round at Wimbledon and won a WTA Tour doubles title in 1982 at the German Open (with Beverly Mould). She is married to cricket coach Graham Ford.

== WTA Tour finals ==
=== Doubles (1–0) ===
Result	Date	Tournament	Surface	Partner	Opponent	Score
Win	May 1982	German Open	Clay	(South Africa) Beverly Mould	(West Germany) Bettina Bunge (West Germany) Claudia Kohde	6–3, 6–4
