= Claudia Kohde-Kilsch =

German tennis player

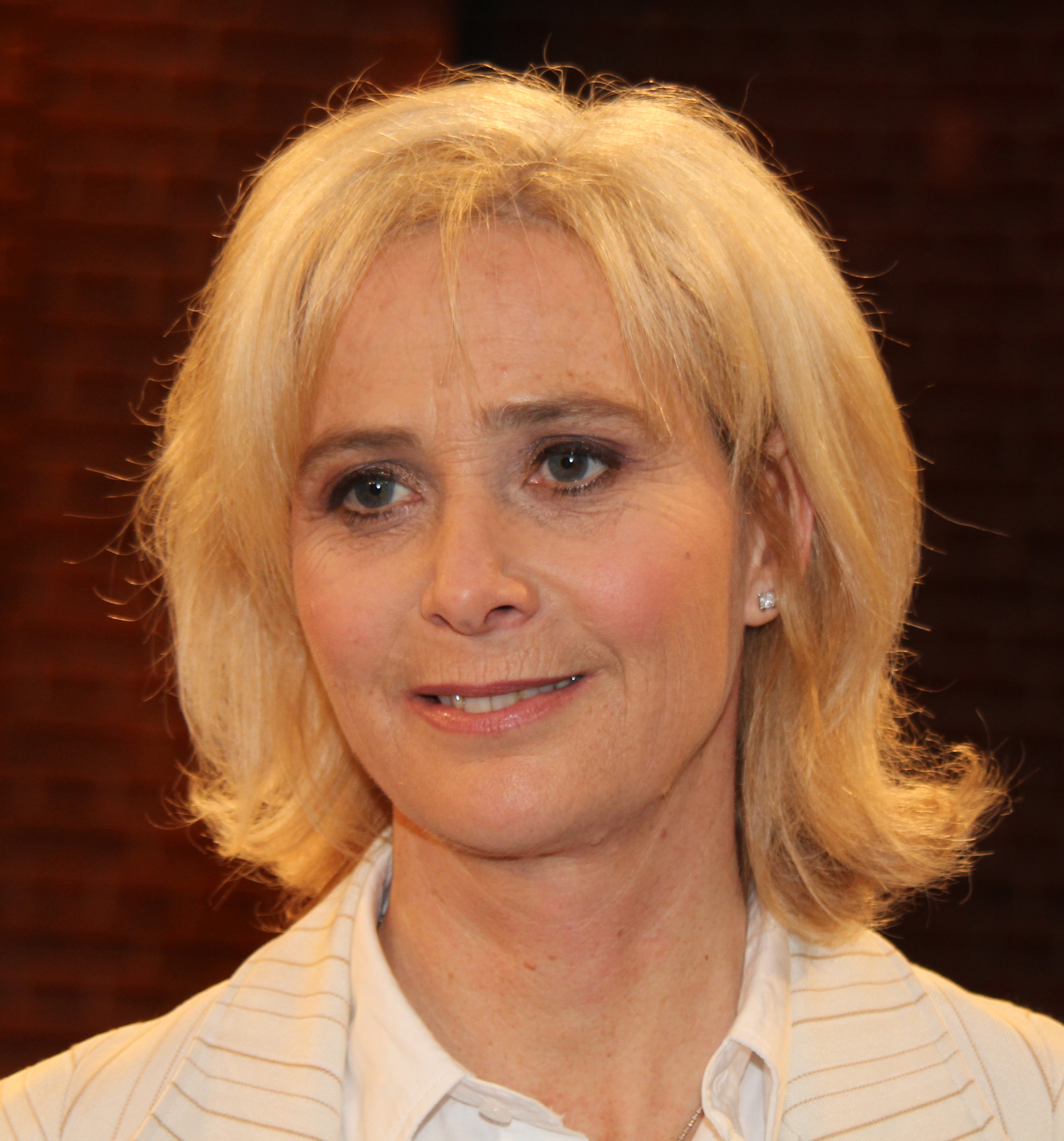
- Country (sports): Germany
- Born: 11 December 1963 (age 62) Saarbrücken, West Germany
- Height: 1.87 m (6 ft 2 in)
- Turned pro: 1980
- Retired: 1994
- Plays: Right-handed (one handed-backhand)
- Prize money: $2,227,116

Singles
- Career record: 408–224
- Career titles: 8
- Highest ranking: No. 4 (2 September 1985)

Grand Slam singles results
- Australian Open: SF (1985, 1987, 1988)
- French Open: SF (1985)
- Wimbledon: QF (1987)
- US Open: QF (1985, 1987)

Other tournaments
- Olympic Games: 2R (1988)

Doubles
- Career record: 438–175
- Career titles: 25
- Highest ranking: No. 3 (17 August 1987)

Grand Slam doubles results
- Australian Open: F (1982, 1984, 1985)
- French Open: F (1984, 1985, 1988)
- Wimbledon: W (1987)
- US Open: W (1985)

Other doubles tournaments
- Tour Finals: F (1983, 1985, 1986^{(Mar)}, 1986^{(Nov)}, 1987)
- Olympic Games: SF (1988)

Team competitions
- Fed Cup: 28–12
Medal record
Olympic Games
Representing West Germany
Bronze medal – third place	1988 Seoul	Doubles

Claudia Kohde-Kilsch (née Kohde; born 11 December 1963) is a former German tennis player and member of the Die Linke. During her tennis career, she won two women's doubles Grand Slam titles. She also won eight singles titles and a total of 25 doubles titles.

== Personal life ==
Kohde-Kilsch was born Claudia Kohde in Saarbrücken, but added the hyphenated "-Kilsch" to her name which came from her adoptive father Jürgen Kilsch, an attorney. She has a younger sister, Katrin. She began playing tennis aged 5, and was soon a rising junior player.

Kohde-Kilsch campaigned for Oskar Lafontaine of Die Linke at the 2012 Saarland state election. With the party winning over 16% of the vote, it was announced that as of 1 May 2012 she would become the new spokesperson for the Landtag parliamentary group.

She currently lives in Saarland with her partner and her son Fynn from her previous marriage with the singer Chris Bennett, from whom she divorced in 2011. Bennett died in 2018. The couple operated CeKay Music, a music publishing house and production company.

== Pro tennis career ==
Kohde-Kilsch turned professional on 1 January 1980, and by 1981, she had defeated Martina Navratilova in Oakland. In 1982, she captured the title at Pittsburgh, and in 1984, she triumphed at the German Open, defeating Kathleen Horvath of the United States 7–6, 6–1.

In 1985, she reached the Australian Open and French Open semifinals as well as won in Los Angeles. Later that year, she defeated Navrátilová in the quarterfinals at the Canadian Open, eventually losing to Chris Evert, 2–6, 4–6 in the final. In 1987, she again reached the finals of the German Open, where she lost to Steffi Graf 2–6, 3–6.

In women's doubles, Kohde-Kilsch and Helena Suková won the 1985 US Open and the 1987 Wimbledon Championships.

Between 1984 and 1987, Kohde-Kilsch and Suková, sometimes referred to as the "twin towers" for their height, won 14 doubles tournaments. At the 1988 Summer Olympics, she partnered with Steffi Graf in the doubles competition, and they won the bronze medal in the event.

== Grand Slam finals ==
=== Doubles: 8 (2 titles, 6 runner-ups) ===
Result	Year	Championship	Surface	Partner	Opponent	Score
Loss	1982	Australian Open	Grass	(West Germany) Eva Pfaff	(United States) Martina Navratilova (United States) Pam Shriver	4–6, 2–6
Loss	1984	French Open	Clay	(Czechoslovakia) Hana Mandlíková	(United States) Martina Navratilova (United States) Pam Shriver	7–5, 3–6, 2–6
Loss	1984	Australian Open	Grass	(Czechoslovakia) Helena Suková	(United States) Martina Navratilova (United States) Pam Shriver	3–6, 4–6
Loss	1985	French Open	Clay	(Czechoslovakia) Helena Suková	(United States) Martina Navratilova (United States) Pam Shriver	6–4, 2–6, 2–6
Win	1985	US Open	Hard	(Czechoslovakia) Helena Suková	(United States) Martina Navratilova (United States) Pam Shriver	6–7^{(5–7)}, 6–2, 6–3
Loss	1985	Australian Open	Grass	(Czechoslovakia) Helena Suková	(United States) Martina Navratilova (United States) Pam Shriver	3–6, 4–6
Win	1987	Wimbledon	Grass	(Czechoslovakia) Helena Suková	(United States) Betsy Nagelsen (Australia) Elizabeth Smylie	7–5, 7–5
Loss	1988	French Open	Clay	(Czechoslovakia) Helena Suková	(United States) Martina Navratilova (United States) Pam Shriver	2–6, 5–7

== Olympic Games ==
=== Doubles: 1 (bronze) ===
Result	Year	Location	Surface	Partner	Opponents	Score
Bronze	1988	Seoul	Hard	(West Germany) Steffi Graf	N.A.	DNP

Graf and Kohde-Kilsch lost in the semifinals to Jana Novotná and Helena Suková 5–7, 3–6. In 1988, there was no bronze medal play-off match, both beaten semifinal pairs received bronze medals.

== Other significant finals ==
=== Year-end championships ===
==== Doubles: 5 (runner-ups) ====
Result	Year	Championship	Surface	Partner	Opponent	Score
Loss	1983	New York	Carpet (i)	(West Germany) Eva Pfaff	(United States) Martina Navratilova (United States) Pam Shriver	5–7, 2–6
Loss	1985	New York	Carpet (i)	(Czechoslovakia) Helena Suková	(United States) Martina Navratilova (United States) Pam Shriver	7–6^{(7–4)}, 4–6, 6–7^{(5–7)}
Loss	1986^{(Mar)}	New York	Carpet (i)	(Czechoslovakia) Helena Suková	(Czechoslovakia) Hana Mandlíková (Australia) Wendy Turnbull	4–6, 7–6^{(7–4)}, 3–6
Loss	1986^{(Nov)}	New York	Carpet (i)	(Czechoslovakia) Helena Suková	(United States) Martina Navratilova (United States) Pam Shriver	6–7^{(1–7)}, 3–6
Loss	1987	New York	Carpet (i)	(Czechoslovakia) Helena Suková	(United States) Martina Navratilova (United States) Pam Shriver	1–6, 1–6

== WTA Tour finals ==
=== Singles: 16 (8–8) ===
Winner – Legend Grand Slam tournaments (0–0) Tier I (0–0) Tier II (0–0) Tier III (0–0) Tier IV (1–0) Tier V (1–0) Virginia Slims, Avon, other (6–8)	Finals by surface Hard (1–1) Grass (1–0) Clay (3–4) Carpet (3–3)

Result	No.	Date	Tournament	Surface	Opponent	Score
Win	1.	Jan 1981	Toronto, Canada	Carpet (i)	(Sweden) Nina Bohm	4–6, 6–2, 7–5
Win	2.	Jul 1981	Kitzbühel, Austria	Clay	(West Germany) Sylvia Hanika	7–5, 7–6
Win	3.	Jan 1982	Pittsburgh, US	Hard	(West Germany) Eva Pfaff	6–4, 6–0
Win	4.	Mar 1982	Austin, US	Carpet (i)	(Czechoslovakia) Helena Suková	7–6^{(7–0)}, 0–6, 6–3
Loss	1.	Apr 1984	Hilton Head, US	Clay	(United States) Chris Evert-Lloyd	2–6, 3–6
Win	5.	May 1984	Berlin, West Germany	Clay	(United States) Kathleen Horvath	7–6^{(10–8)}, 6–1
Loss	2.	Oct 1984	Zürich, Switzerland	Carpet (i)	(United States) Zina Garrison	1–6, 6–0, 2–6
Loss	3.	Dec 1984	Tokyo, Japan	Carpet (i)	(Bulgaria) Manuela Maleeva	6–3, 4–6, 4–6
Win	6.	Jul 1985	Los Angeles, US	Hard	(United States) Pam Shriver	6–2, 6–4
Loss	4.	Aug 1985	Toronto, Canada	Hard	(United States) Chris Evert-Lloyd	2–6, 4–6
Loss	5.	Jan 1986	Worcester, UK	Carpet (i)	(United States) Martina Navratilova	6–4, 1–6, 4–6
Loss	6.	Mar 1986	Marco Island, US	Clay	(United States) Chris Evert-Lloyd	4–6, 2–6
Loss	7.	Apr 1986	Amelia Island, US	Clay	(West Germany) Steffi Graf	4–6, 7–5, 6–7^{(3–7)}
Loss	8.	May 1987	Berlin, West Germany	Clay	(West Germany) Steffi Graf	2–6, 3–6
Win	7.	Jun 1988	Birmingham, UK	Grass	(United States) Pam Shriver	6–1, 6–2
Win	8.	Sep 1990	Kitzbühel, Austria	Clay	(Australia) Rachel McQuillan	7–6^{(7–5)}, 6–4

=== Doubles: 64 (25–39) ===
Winner – Legend Grand Slam tournaments (2–6) WTA Tour Championships (0–5) Tier I (1–2) Tier II (1–3) Tier III (0–1) Tier IV (0–3) Tier V (2–1) Virginia Slims, Avon, other (19–18)	Finals by surface Hard (5–8) Grass (2–9) Clay (10–8) Carpet (8–14)

Result	No.	Date	Tournament	Surface	Partner	Opponents	Score
Win	1.	Jul 1980	Kitzbühel	Clay	(West Germany) Eva Pfaff	(Czechoslovakia) Hana Mandlíková (Czechoslovakia) Renáta Tomanová	w/o
Win	2.	Jul 1981	Kitzbühel	Hard	(West Germany) Eva Pfaff	(Australia) Elizabeth Little (South Africa) Yvonne Vermaak	6–4, 6–3
Loss	1.	May 1982	Berlin	Clay	(West Germany) Bettina Bunge	(South Africa) Liz Gordon (South Africa) Beverly Mould	3–6, 4–6
Loss	2.	Nov 1982	Brisbane	Grass	(West Germany) Eva Pfaff	(United States) Billie Jean King (United States) Anne Smith	3–6, 4–6
Loss	3.	Nov 1982	Sydney	Grass	(West Germany) Eva Pfaff	(United States) Martina Navratilova (United States) Pam Shriver	3–6, 6–2, 6–7
Loss	4.	Nov 1982	Australian Open	Grass	(West Germany) Eva Pfaff	(United States) Martina Navratilova (United States) Pam Shriver	4–6, 2–6
Win	3.	Feb 1983	Oakland	Carpet (i)	(West Germany) Eva Pfaff	(United States) Rosie Casals (Australia) Wendy Turnbull	6–4, 4–6, 6–4
Loss	5.	Mar 1983	Virginia Slims Championships	Carpet (i)	(West Germany) Eva Pfaff	(United States) Martina Navratilova (United States) Pam Shriver	5–7, 2–6
Loss	6.	May 1983	Berlin	Clay	(West Germany) Eva Pfaff	(United Kingdom) Jo Durie (United Kingdom) Anne Hobbs	4–6, 6–7^{(2–7)}
Win	4.	Jul 1983	Hittfeld	Clay	(West Germany) Bettina Bunge	(Argentina) Ivanna Madruga (France) Catherine Tanvier	7–5, 6–4
Win	5.	Apr 1984	Hilton Head	Clay	(Czechoslovakia) Hana Mandlíková	(United Kingdom) Anne Hobbs (United States) Sharon Walsh	7–5, 6–2
Win	6.	Apr 1984	Orlando	Clay	(Czechoslovakia) Hana Mandlíková	(United Kingdom) Anne Hobbs (Australia) Wendy Turnbull	6–0, 1–6, 6–3
Loss	7.	May 1984	French Open	Clay	(Czechoslovakia) Hana Mandlíková	(United States) Martina Navratilova (United States) Pam Shriver	7–5, 3–6, 2–6
Loss	8.	Aug 1984	Montreal	Hard	(Czechoslovakia) Hana Mandlíková	(United States) Kathy Jordan (Australia) Elizabeth Sayers	1–6, 2–6
Win	7.	Oct 1984	Filderstadt	Carpet (i)	(Czechoslovakia) Helena Suková	(West Germany) Bettina Bunge (West Germany) Eva Pfaff	6–2, 4–6, 6–3
Loss	9.	Oct 1984	Zürich	Carpet (i)	(Czechoslovakia) Hana Mandlíková	(United States) Andrea Leand (Hungary) Andrea Temesvári	1–6, 3–6
Win	8.	Nov 1984	Sydney	Grass	(Czechoslovakia) Helena Suková	(Australia) Wendy Turnbull (United States) Sharon Walsh	6–2, 7–6^{(7–4)}
Loss	10.	Nov 1984	Australian Open	Grass	(Czechoslovakia) Helena Suková	(United States) Martina Navratilova (United States) Pam Shriver	3–6, 4–6
Win	9.	Dec 1984	Tokyo	Carpet (i)	(Czechoslovakia) Helena Suková	(Australia) Elizabeth Smylie (France) Catherine Tanvier	6–4, 6–4
Loss	11.	Jan 1985	Washington	Carpet (i)	(Czechoslovakia) Helena Suková	(United States) Gigi Fernández (United States) Martina Navratilova	3–6, 6–3, 3–6
Loss	12.	Mar 1985	Virginia Slims Championships	Carpet (i)	(Czechoslovakia) Helena Suková	(United States) Martina Navratilova (United States) Pam Shriver	7–6^{(7–4)}, 4–6, 6–7^{(5–7)}
Win	10.	May 1985	Berlin	Clay	(Czechoslovakia) Helena Suková	(West Germany) Steffi Graf (France) Catherine Tanvier	6–4, 6–1
Loss	13.	May 1985	French Open	Clay	(Czechoslovakia) Helena Suková	(United States) Martina Navratilova (United States) Pam Shriver	6–4, 2–6, 2–6
Win	11.	Jul 1985	Los Angeles	Hard	(Czechoslovakia) Helena Suková	(Czechoslovakia) Hana Mandlíková (Australia) Wendy Turnbull	6–4, 6–2
Loss	14.	Aug 1985	Mahwah	Hard	(Czechoslovakia) Helena Suková	(United States) Kathy Jordan (Australia) Elizabeth Smylie	6–7^{(6–8)}, 3–6
Win	12.	Aug 1985	US Open	Hard	(Czechoslovakia) Helena Suková	(United States) Martina Navratilova (United States) Pam Shriver	6–7^{(5–7)}, 6–2, 6–3
Loss	15.	Oct 1985	Zürich	Carpet (i)	(Czechoslovakia) Helena Suková	(Czechoslovakia) Hana Mandlíková (Hungary) Andrea Temesvári	4–6, 6–3, 5–7
Loss	16.	Nov 1985	Brisbane	Grass	(Czechoslovakia) Helena Suková	(United States) Martina Navratilova (United States) Pam Shriver	4–6, 7–6^{(8–6)}, 1–6
Loss	17.	Nov 1985	Australian Open	Grass	(Czechoslovakia) Helena Suková	(United States) Martina Navratilova (United States) Pam Shriver	3–6, 4–6
Win	13.	Dec 1985	Tokyo	Carpet (i)	(Czechoslovakia) Helena Suková	(Netherlands) Marcella Mesker (Australia) Elizabeth Smylie	6–0, 6–4
Loss	18.	Jan 1986	Washington	Carpet (i)	(Czechoslovakia) Helena Suková	(United States) Martina Navratilova (United States) Pam Shriver	3–6, 4–6
Loss	19.	Jan 1986	Worcester	Carpet (i)	(Czechoslovakia) Helena Suková	(United States) Martina Navratilova (United States) Pam Shriver	3–6, 1–6
Win	14.	Mar 1986	Dallas	Carpet (i)	(Czechoslovakia) Helena Suková	(Czechoslovakia) Hana Mandlíková (Australia) Wendy Turnbull	4–6, 7–5, 6–4
Loss	20.	Mar 1986	Virginia Slims Championship	Carpet (i)	(Czechoslovakia) Helena Suková	(Czechoslovakia) Hana Mandlíková (Australia) Wendy Turnbull	4–6, 7–6^{(7–4)}, 3–6
Win	15.	Apr 1986	Amelia Island	Clay	(Czechoslovakia) Helena Suková	(Argentina) Gabriela Sabatini (France) Catherine Tanvier	6–2, 5–7, 7–6^{(9–7)}
Loss	21.	Jun 1986	Eastbourne	Grass	(Czechoslovakia) Helena Suková	(United States) Martina Navratilova (United States) Pam Shriver	2–6, 4–6
Loss	22.	Aug 1986	Los Angeles	Hard	(Czechoslovakia) Helena Suková	(United States) Martina Navratilova (United States) Pam Shriver	4–6, 3–6
Loss	23.	Nov 1986	Worcester	Carpet (i)	(Czechoslovakia) Helena Suková	(United States) Martina Navratilova (United States) Pam Shriver	5–7, 3–6
Win	16.	Nov 1986	Chicago	Clay	(Czechoslovakia) Helena Suková	(West Germany) Steffi Graf (Argentina) Gabriela Sabatini	6–7^{(5–7)}, 7–6^{(7–5)}, 6–3
Loss	24.	Nov 1986	Virginia Slims Championship	Carpet (i)	(Czechoslovakia) Helena Suková	(United States) Martina Navratilova (United States) Pam Shriver	6–7^{(1–7)}, 3–6
Win	17.	Jan 1987	Tokyo	Carpet (i)	(Czechoslovakia) Helena Suková	(United States) Elise Burgin (United States) Pam Shriver	6–1, 7–6^{(7–5)}
Loss	25.	Feb 1987	Key Biscayne	Hard	(Czechoslovakia) Helena Suková	(United States) Martina Navratilova (United States) Pam Shriver	3–6, 6–7^{(6–8)}
Loss	26.	Feb 1987	Rome	Clay	(Czechoslovakia) Helena Suková	(United States) Martina Navratilova (Argentina) Gabriela Sabatini	4–6, 1–6
Win	18.	May 1987	Berlin	Clay	(Czechoslovakia) Helena Suková	(Sweden) Catarina Lindqvist (Denmark) Tine Scheuer-Larsen	6–1, 6–2
Win	19.	Jun 1987	Wimbledon	Grass	(Czechoslovakia) Helena Suková	(United States) Betsy Nagelsen (Australia) Elizabeth Smylie	7–5, 7–5
Loss	27.	Aug 1987	Toronto	Hard	(Czechoslovakia) Helena Suková	(United States) Zina Garrison (United States) Lori McNeil	1–6, 2–6
Win	20.	Sep 1987	Hamburg	Clay	(Czechoslovakia) Jana Novotná	(Soviet Union) Natalia Bykova (Soviet Union) Leila Meskhi	7–6^{(7–1)}, 7–6^{(8–6)}
Win	21.	Nov 1987	Chicago	Carpet (i)	(Czechoslovakia) Helena Suková	(United States) Zina Garrison (United States) Lori McNeil	6–4, 6–3
Loss	28.	Nov 1987	Virginia Slims Championship	Carpet (i)	(Czechoslovakia) Helena Suková	(United States) Martina Navratilova (United States) Pam Shriver	1–6, 1–6
Loss	29.	Dec 1987	Brisbane	Grass	(Czechoslovakia) Helena Suková	(United States) Betsy Nagelsen (United States) Pam Shriver	6–2, 5–7, 2–6
Loss	30.	Jan 1988	Sydney	Grass	(Czechoslovakia) Helena Suková	(United States) Ann Henricksson (Switzerland) Christiane Jolissaint	6–7^{(5–7)}, 6–4, 3–6
Loss	31.	Mar 1988	Boca Raton	Hard	(Czechoslovakia) Helena Suková	(United States) Katrina Adams (United States) Zina Garrison	6–4, 5–7, 4–6
Loss	32.	Apr 1988	Hilton Head	Clay	(Argentina) Gabriela Sabatini	(United States) Lori McNeil (United States) Martina Navratilova	2–6, 6–2, 3–6
Loss	33.	May 1988	Berlin	Clay	(Czechoslovakia) Helena Suková	(France) Isabelle Demongeot (France) Nathalie Tauziat	2–6, 6–4, 4–6
Loss	34.	May 1988	French Open	Clay	(Czechoslovakia) Helena Suková	(United States) Martina Navratilova (United States) Pam Shriver	2–6, 5–7
Loss	35.	Oct 1988	Zürich	Carpet (i)	(Czechoslovakia) Helena Suková	(France) Isabelle Demongeot (France) Nathalie Tauziat	3–6, 3–6
Win	22.	Nov 1988	Adelaide	Hard	(West Germany) Sylvia Hanika	(Czechoslovakia) Jana Novotná (United States) Lori McNeil	7–5, 6–7^{(4–7)}, 6–4
Loss	36.	Jan 1989	Tokyo	Carpet (i)	(United States) Mary Joe Fernández	(United States) Katrina Adams (United States) Zina Garrison	3–6, 6–3, 6–7^{(5–7)}
Loss	37.	Aug 1989	Los Angeles	Hard	(United States) Mary Joe Fernández	(United States) Martina Navratilova (Australia) Wendy Turnbull	2–5 ret.
Win	23.	Feb 1991	Oslo	Carpet (i)	(Germany) Silke Meier	(Belgium) Sabine Appelmans (Italy) Raffaella Reggi	3–6, 6–2, 6–4
Win	24.	Apr 1991	Hilton Head	Clay	(Soviet Union) Natasha Zvereva	(United States) Mary-Lou Daniels (South Africa) Lise Gregory	6–4, 6–0
Loss	38.	Aug 1991	Toronto	Hard	(Czechoslovakia) Helena Suková	(Soviet Union) Larisa Savchenko (Soviet Union) Natasha Zvereva	6–1, 5–7, 2–6
Win	25.	Feb 1992	Indian Wells	Hard	(United States) Stephanie Rehe	(Canada) Jill Hetherington (United States) Kathy Rinaldi	6–3, 6–3
Loss	39.	Sep 1992	Bayonne	Carpet (i)	(United States) Stephanie Rehe	(Italy) Linda Ferrando (Czechoslovakia) Petra Langrová	6–1, 3–6, 4–6

== Performance timelines ==
Key
W	F	SF	QF	#R	RR	Q#	DNQ	A	NH

(W) winner; (F) finalist; (SF) semifinalist; (QF) quarterfinalist; (#R) rounds 4, 3, 2, 1; (RR) round-robin stage; (Q#) qualification round; (DNQ) did not qualify; (A) absent; (NH) not held; (SR) strike rate (events won / competed); (W–L) win–loss record.

=== Singles ===
Tournament	1980	1981	1982	1983	1984	1985	1986		1987	1988	1989	1990	1991	1992	SR	W–L
Grand Slam tournaments
Australian Open	1R	1R	3R	3R	3R	SF	NH		SF	SF	QF	1R	1R	2R	0 / 12	24–12
French Open	1R	1R	2R	3R	4R	SF	4R		QF	3R	1R	2R	2R	1R	0 / 13	21–13
Wimbledon	A	2R	4R	4R	4R	2R	3R		QF	A	3R	3R	3R	2R	0 / 11	24–11
US Open	A	1R	3R	2R	4R	QF	4R		QF	3R	1R	A	1R	A	0 / 10	19–10
Win–loss	0–2	1–4	7–4	8–4	11–4	14–4	8–3		16–4	9–3	6–4	3–3	3–4	3–3	0 / 46	88–46
Year-end championships
WTA Championships	did not qualify					1R	QF	QF	1R	1R	did not qualify				0 / 5	2–5
Career statistics
Year-end ranking	78	20	19	22	8	5	7		10	12	36	46	78	79		

=== Doubles ===
Tournament	1980	1981	1982	1983	1984	1985	1986		1987	1988	1989	1990	1991	1992	SR	W–L
Grand Slam tournaments
Australian Open	QF	1R	F	1R	F	F	NH		SF	A	3R	A	1R	3R	0 / 10	21–9
French Open	1R	SF	QF	QF	F	F	SF		SF	F	1R	QF	3R	1R	0 / 13	37–13
Wimbledon	A	1R	SF	QF	QF	SF	2R		W	A	3R	2R	3R	3R	1 / 11	26–10
US Open	A	QF	SF	A	3R	W	QF		QF	3R	A	A	QF	A	1 / 8	26–7
Win–loss	2–2	7–4	13–4	5–2	14–4	19–3	8–3		16–3	7–2	4–3	4–2	7–4	4–3	2 / 42	110–39
Year-end championships
WTA Championships	did not qualify			F	DNQ	F	F	F	F	SF	did not qualify				0 / 6	11–6
Career statistics
Year-end ranking	no rankings				5	4	3		3	8	37	52	24	25		
