= Yvonne Vermaak =

South African tennis player (born 1956)

- Country (sports): South Africa
- Born: 18 December 1956 (age 68) Port Elizabeth, South Africa
- Height: 1.56 m (5 ft 1 1/2 in)
- Plays: Right-handed
- Prize money: US$497,124

Singles
- Career record: 184–172

Grand Slam singles results
- French Open: 4R (1982)
- Wimbledon: SF (1983)
- US Open: 3R (1984)

Doubles
- Career record: 111–129

Grand Slam doubles results
- Australian Open: 2R (1982, 1983, 1984)
- French Open: SF (1982)
- Wimbledon: QF (1982, 1985, 1986)
- US Open: QF (1981)

Grand Slam mixed doubles results
- Wimbledon: 3R (1982)
- US Open: 3R (1984)

Yvonne Vermaak (born 18 December 1956) is a former tour tennis player who represented her native South Africa.

Vermaak's best result was reaching the semi-finals of the 1983 Wimbledon Championships, defeating Virginia Wade in the quarter-finals.

In 1977 she won the All England Plate, a competition for players who were defeated in the first three rounds of the Wimbledon singles competition. In the final she defeated Sue Mappin in straight sets.

Late in her playing career, Vermaak became an American citizen.

Vermaak played USTA Master's tennis. Representing Illinois, she was the 1992 Singles Champion of the USTA National Women's Indoor Championships in Homewood for 35s. In 1993, Yvonne Vermaak was the 25s Singles Champion, and again she was the 25s Singles Champion in 1994. In 1995, Vermaak moved to doubles, winning the 25s and 35s doubles with Ann Kiyomura-Hayashi of California. The 1995 Championships was Vermaak's last USTA Championships win.

== Career finals ==
=== Singles 6 (4–2) ===
Result	No.	Date	Tournament	Surface	Opponent	Score
Win	1–0	Jun 1977	Beckenham, England	Grass	(United Kingdom) Michelle Tyler	6–4, 5–7, 6–1
Loss	1–1	Sep 1978	San Antonio, Texas, U.S.	Hard	(United States) Stacy Margolin	5–7, 1–6
Loss	1–2	Jan 1982	Fort Myers, Florida, U.S.	Hard	(South Korea) Lee Duk-hee	0–6, 3–6
Win	2–2	Mar 1983	Palm Springs, California, U.S.	Hard	(Canada) Carling Bassett	6–3, 7–5
Win	3–2	Sep 1983	Salt Lake City, Utah, U.S.	Hard	(United States) Felicia Raschiatore	6–2, 0–6, 7–5
Win	4–2	Sep 1984	Salt Lake City, Utah, U.S.	Hard	(United States) Terry Holladay	6–1, 6–2

=== Doubles 7 (4–3) ===
Finals by surface
Hard	2
Clay	2
Grass	0
Carpet	0

Result	No.	Date	Tournament	Surface	Partner	Opponents	Score
Loss	0–1	Jun 1978	Chichester, England	Grass	(United Kingdom) Michelle Tyler	(United States) Janet Newberry (United States) Pam Shriver	6–3, 3–6, 4–6
Loss	0–2	Jul 1981	Kitzbühel, Austria	Clay	(Australia) Elizabeth Little	(West Germany) Claudia Kohde-Kilsch (West Germany) Eva Pfaff	4–6, 3–6
Win	1–2	May 1982	Perugia, Italy	Clay	(United States) Kathy Horvath	(United States) Billie Jean King (South Africa) Ilana Kloss	2–6, 6–4, 7–6
Loss	1–3	Nov 1982	Hong Kong	Clay	(South Africa) Jennifer Mundel	(United States) Laura duPont (United States) Alycia Moulton	2–6, 6–4, 5–7
Win	2–3	Sep 1983	Salt Lake City, Utah, U.S.	Hard	(Brazil) Cláudia Monteiro	(United Kingdom) Amanda Brown (Australia) Brenda Remilton	6–1, 3–6, 6–4
Win	3–3	Feb 1984	Indianapolis, Indiana, U.S.	Hard	(Brazil) Cláudia Monteiro	(South Africa) Beverly Mould (Australia) Elizabeth Sayers	6–7, 6–4, 7–5
Win	4–3	Apr 1984	Miami, Florida, U.S.	Clay	(Brazil) Patricia Medrado	(United States) Kate Latham (United States) Janet Newberry	6–3, 6–3
