= Bettina Bunge =

West German tennis player

- Country (sports): West Germany
- Residence: Monte Carlo, Monaco
- Born: 13 June 1963 (age 63) Adliswil, Switzerland
- Height: 1.73 m (5 ft 8 in)
- Turned pro: 1978
- Retired: 1989
- Plays: Right-handed (one–handed backhand)
- Prize money: $1,126,424

Singles
- Career record: 294–177
- Career titles: 4
- Highest ranking: No. 6 (28 March 1983)

Grand Slam singles results
- Australian Open: 3R (1981)
- French Open: 4R (1981)
- Wimbledon: SF (1982)
- US Open: 4R (1981, 1987)

Doubles
- Career record: 206–153
- Career titles: 4
- Highest ranking: No. 17 (19 January 1987)

Grand Slam doubles results
- Australian Open: 2R (1980)
- French Open: SF (1981)
- Wimbledon: SF (1982)
- US Open: SF (1982)

Bettina Bunge (born 13 June 1963) is a retired German tennis player. Born in Adliswil, Switzerland, she was part of a large group of successful German players in the 1980s, which also included Steffi Graf, Claudia Kohde-Kilsch, Sylvia Hanika, and Eva Pfaff.

== Career ==
With German nationality as the daughter of a German businessman, she was born in Switzerland, and resided in Peru for more than 13 years. She was a national champion in Peru at the age of 13, and later moved to Miami, Florida. She dealt with a series of injuries (ear and knee, among others) throughout her career.

Bunge was a professional player from 1978 to 1989, appearing for the first time at No. 150 in July 1978. Her career-high ranking of No. 6 she achieved in 1983. In 1982, she registered her all-time best achievement in Grand Slam singles competition when she reached the semifinals of Wimbledon.

She won four singles tournaments, including the tournaments at the German Open, Houston, and Tokyo in 1982, and Oakland in 1983. She was finalist in Sydney in 1979, Stockholm in 1980, Houston, Tampa, Cincinnati (indoor) and Tokyo in 1981, Mahwah in 1982 and Knokke in 1987.

Bunge won four doubles tournaments, including the tournaments of Pan Pacific in Tokyo with Steffi Graf in 1986 and The Belgian Open with Manuela Maleeva in 1987. She was a finalist at the German Open with Claudia Kohde-Kilsch in 1982, the Swiss Open with Eva Pfaff in 1985, and New England, also Pfaff, in 1987.

She was a part of the German Federation Cup Team from 1980 to 1983, 1985 to 1987 and 1989. She won the 1987 WTA Comeback of the Year Award. Bunge lives in Coral Gables, Florida.

== WTA career finals ==
=== Singles: 13 (4–9) ===
| Winner — Legend Grand Slam tournaments (0–0) WTA Tour Championships (0–0) Virginia Slims, Avon, other (4–9) | Finals by surface Hard (0–2) Grass (0–1) Clay (1–1) Carpet (3–5) |

| Result | W/L | Date | Tournament | Surface | Opponent | Score |
|---|---|---|---|---|---|---|
| Loss | 0–1 | Jan 1979 | Toronto, Canada | Carpet (i) | (United States) Barbara Potter | 1–6, 4–6 |
| Loss | 0–2 | Dec 1979 | Sydney, Australia | Grass | (Czechoslovakia) Hana Mandlíková | 3–6, 6–3, 3–6 |
| Loss | 0–3 | Oct 1980 | Stockholm, Sweden | Carpet (i) | (Czechoslovakia) Hana Mandlíková | 2–6, 2–6 |
| Loss | 0–4 | Feb 1981 | Houston, U.S. | Carpet (i) | (Czechoslovakia) Hana Mandlíková | 4–6, 4–6 |
| Loss | 0–5 | Sep 1981 | Tokyo, Japan | Carpet (i) | (United States) Ann Kiyomura | 4–6, 5–7 |
| Loss | 0–6 | Oct 1981 | Tampa, U.S. | Hard | (United States) Martina Navratilova | 7–5, 2–6, 0–6 |
| Loss | 0–7 | Jan 1982 | Cincinnati, U.S. | Carpet (i) | (United States) Barbara Potter | 4–6, 6–7^{(3–7)} |
| Win | 1–7 | Feb 1982 | Houston, U.S. | Carpet (i) | (United States) Pam Shriver | 6–2, 3–6, 6–2 |
| Win | 2–7 | May 1982 | Berlin, West Germany | Clay | (United States) Kathy Rinaldi | 6–2, 6–2 |
| Loss | 2–8 | Aug 1982 | Mahwah, U.S. | Hard | (United States) Leigh-Anne Thompson | 6–7^{(4–7)}, 3–6 |
| Win | 3–8 | Sep 1982 | Tokyo, Japan | Carpet (i) | (United States) Barbara Potter | 7–6, 6–2 |
| Win | 4–8 | Feb 1983 | Oakland, U.S. | Carpet (i) | (West Germany) Sylvia Hanika | 6–3, 6–3 |
| Loss | 4–9 | Jul 1987 | Knokke, Belgium | Clay | (United States) Kathleen Horvath | 1–6, 6–7^{(5–7)} |

=== Doubles: 10 (4–6) ===
| Winner — Legend Grand Slam tournaments (0–0) WTA Tour Championships (0–0) Virginia Slims, Avon, other (4–6) | Finals by surface Hard 0–1) Grass (0–1) Clay (3–2) Carpet (1–2) |

| Result | W/L | Date | Tournament | Surface | Partner | Opponents | Score |
|---|---|---|---|---|---|---|---|
| Loss | 0–1 | May 1982 | Berlin, West Germany | Clay | (West Germany) Claudia Kohde-Kilsch | (South Africa) Liz Gordon (South Africa) Beverly Mould | 3–6, 4–6 |
| Win | 1–1 | Jul 1983 | Hamburg, West Germany | Clay | (West Germany) Claudia Kohde-Kilsch | (Argentina) Ivanna Madruga (France) Catherine Tanvier | 7–5, 6–4 |
| Win | 2–1 | Jul 1983 | Freiburg, West Germany | Clay | (West Germany) Eva Pfaff | (Argentina) Ivanna Madruga (Argentina) Emilse Raponi-Longo | 6–1, 6–2 |
| Loss | 2–2 | Oct 1984 | Los Angeles, US | Hard (i) | (West Germany) Eva Pfaff | (United States) Chris Evert-Lloyd (United States) Wendy Turnbull | 2–6, 4–6 |
| Loss | 2–3 | Oct 1984 | Filderstadt, West Germany | Carpet (i) | (West Germany) Eva Pfaff | (West Germany) Claudia Kohde-Kilsch (Czechoslovakia) Helena Suková | 2–6, 6–4, 3–6 |
| Loss | 2–4 | Nov 1984 | Brisbane, Australia | Grass | (West Germany) Eva Pfaff | (United States) Martina Navratilova (United States) Pam Shriver | 3–6, 2–6 |
| Loss | 2–5 | May 1985 | Lugano, Switzerland | Clay | (West Germany) Eva Pfaff | (United States) Bonnie Gadusek (Czechoslovakia) Helena Suková | 2–6, 4–6 |
| Win | 3–5 | Sep 1986 | Tokyo, Japan | Carpet (i) | (West Germany) Steffi Graf | (Bulgaria) Katerina Maleeva (Bulgaria) Manuela Maleeva | 6–1, 6–7^{(4–7)}, 6–2 |
| Win | 4–5 | Jul 1987 | Knokke, Belgium | Clay | (Bulgaria) Manuela Maleeva | (United States) Kathleen Horvath (Netherlands) Marcella Mesker | 4–6, 6–4, 6–4 |
| Loss | 4–6 | Nov 1987 | Worcester, US | Carpet (i) | (West Germany) Eva Pfaff | (United States) Elise Burgin (South Africa) Rosalyn Fairbank | 4–6, 4–6 |

== Grand Slam singles performance timeline ==
Key
| W | F | SF | QF | #R | RR | Q# | DNQ | A | NH |

(W) winner; (F) finalist; (SF) semifinalist; (QF) quarterfinalist; (#R) rounds 4, 3, 2, 1; (RR) round-robin stage; (Q#) qualification round; (DNQ) did not qualify; (A) absent; (NH) not held; (SR) strike rate (events won / competed); (W–L) win–loss record.

| Tournament | 1978 | 1979 | 1980 | 1981 | 1982 | 1983 | 1984 | 1985 | 1986 | 1987 | 1988 | 1989 | Career SR |
|---|---|---|---|---|---|---|---|---|---|---|---|---|---|
| Australian Open | A | A | 1R | 3R | A | A | 2R | 1R | NH | A | A | A | 0 / 4 |
| French Open | A | 3R | 3R | 4R | 2R | 2R | 3R | 3R | 2R | A | A | A | 0 / 8 |
| Wimbledon | A | 2R | 3R | 2R | SF | 1R | 3R | 3R | QF | 3R | A | A | 0 / 9 |
| US Open | 3R | 1R | 3R | 4R | 3R | A | 3R | 1R | 2R | 4R | A | A | 0 / 9 |
| SR | 0 / 1 | 0 / 3 | 0 / 4 | 0 / 4 | 0 / 3 | 0 / 2 | 0 / 4 | 0 / 4 | 0 / 3 | 0 / 2 | 0 / 0 | 0 / 0 | 0 / 30 |
| Year-end ranking | 105 | 32 | 19 | 9 | 9 | 11 | 21 | 23 | 12 | 15 | NR | 71 | |

== See also ==
- Manuela Maleeva
- Steffi Graf
- List of female tennis players

Awards
| Preceded by No award | WTA Comeback Player of the Year; 1987 | Succeeded by (France) Pascale Paradis |
