= 1984 Avon Cup – Singles =

Singles
- 1984 Avon Cup

Final
- Champion: (United States) Bonnie Gadusek
- Runner-up: (United States) Kathleen Horvath
- Score: 3–6, 6–0, 6–4

Details
- Draw: 32
- Seeds: 8

Events
Singles	Doubles
← 1983 ·	Avon Cup	· 1985 →

Andrea Jaeger was the defending champion, but did not compete this year.

Bonnie Gadusek won the title by defeating Kathleen Horvath 3–6, 6–0, 6–4 in the final.

== Seeds ==
1. (United States) Zina Garrison (quarterfinals)
2. (Hungary) Andrea Temesvári (second round)
3. (Czechoslovakia) Hana Mandlíková (second round)
4. (United States) Kathleen Horvath (final)
5. (United States) Bonnie Gadusek (champion)
6. (Czechoslovakia) Helena Suková (first round)
7. (Romania) Virginia Ruzici (semifinals)
8. (Argentina) Ivanna Madruga (quarterfinals)

== Draw ==
=== Key ===
- Q = Qualifier
- WC = Wild card
- LL = Lucky loser
- Alt = Alternate
- SE = Special exempt
- PR = Protected ranking
- ITF = ITF entry
- JE = Junior exempt
- w/o = Walkover
- r = Retired
- d = Defaulted
- SR = Special ranking

=== Finals ===
Semifinals
(United States) Camille Benjamin	3	6
4	(United States) Kathleen Horvath	6	7
5	(United States) Bonnie Gadusek	7	7
7	(Romania) Virginia Ruzici	6	6

Final
4	(United States) Kathleen Horvath	6	0	4
5	(United States) Bonnie Gadusek	3	6	6

=== Top half ===
First round
1	(United States) Z Garrison	6	6
(France) C Vanier	0	3
(United States) M Torres	2	7	6
(Socialist Federal Republic of Yugoslavia) M Jaušovec	6	5	4
(Sweden) C Lindqvist	6	7
(United States) J Klitch	3	5
(United States) C Benjamin	7	6
6	(Czechoslovakia) H Suková	5	4
4	(United States) K Horvath	6	6
(United States) L Allen	1	1
(United States) T Phelps	7	6
(United States) P Teeguarden	5	2
(Italy) S Cecchini	4	6	4
(United Kingdom) A Hobbs	6	4	6
(Canada) C Bassett	3	2
8	(Argentina) I Madruga	6	6

Second round
1	(United States) Z Garrison	6	7
(United States) M Torres	2	5
(Sweden) C Lindqvist	2	1
(United States) C Benjamin	6	6
4	(United States) K Horvath	7	6
(United States) T Phelps	5	4
(United Kingdom) A Hobbs	1	4
8	(Argentina) I Madruga	6	6

Quarterfinals
1	(United States) Z Garrison	3	4
(United States) C Benjamin	6	6
4	(United States) K Horvath	6	6
8	(Argentina) I Madruga	3	4

Semifinals
(United States) C Benjamin	3	6
4	(United States) K Horvath	6	7

=== Bottom half ===
First round
5	(United States) B Gadusek	6	6
(United States) R Casals	0	3
(Bulgaria) M Maleeva	6	4	7
(United States) B Herr	0	6	5
(United States) K Sands	2	2
(United States) P Casale	6	6
(United States) K Keil	2	3
3	(Czechoslovakia) H Mandlíková	6	6
7	(Romania) V Ruzici	6	7
(United States) J Russell	3	6
(Czechoslovakia) I Budařová	6	6
(Australia) A Minter	3	4
(United States) G Purdy	3	6	6
(Peru) L Gildemeister	6	3	7
(Italy) R Reggi	6	5	5
2	(Hungary) A Temesvári	3	7	7

Second round
5	(United States) B Gadusek	6	6
(Bulgaria) M Maleeva	4	2
(United States) P Casale	7	7
3	(Czechoslovakia) H Mandlíková	6	6
7	(Romania) V Ruzici	6	6
(Czechoslovakia) I Budařová	2	3
(Peru) L Gildemeister	6	6
2	(Hungary) A Temesvári	4	2

Quarterfinals
5	(United States) B Gadusek	6	6
(United States) P Casale	2	3
7	(Romania) V Ruzici	6	2	6
(Peru) L Gildemeister	2	6	1

Semifinals
5	(United States) B Gadusek	7	7
7	(Romania) V Ruzici	6	6
