= 1983 Murjani Cup – Doubles =

Doubles
- 1983 Murjani Cup
- 1982 Champions: (United States) Kathy Jordan (United States) Paula Smith

Final
- Champions: (United States) Barbara Potter (United States) Sharon Walsh
- Runners-up: (United States) Kathy Jordan (United States) Paula Smith
- Score: 6–4, 4–6, 6–2

Events
Singles	Doubles
← 1982 ·	Murjani Cup	· 1984 →

Kathy Jordan and Paula Smith were the defending champions but lost in the final 6–4, 4–6, 6–2 against Barbara Potter and Sharon Walsh.

== Seeds ==
Champion seeds are indicated in bold text while text in italics indicates the round in which those seeds were eliminated.

1. (United States) Rosemary Casals / (Australia) Wendy Turnbull (quarterfinals)
2. (United States) **Barbara Potter** / (United States) **Sharon Walsh (champions)**
3. (United States) Kathleen Horvath / (South Africa) Yvonne Vermaak (first round)
4. (United States) Kathy Jordan / (United States) Paula Smith (final)
5. (Czechoslovakia) Hana Mandlíková / (Romania) Virginia Ruzici (semifinals)
6. (United States) Andrea Jaeger / (United States) Mary-Lou Piatek (second round)
7. (Brazil) Patricia Medrado / (Brazil) Cláudia Monteiro (second round)
8. (Czechoslovakia) Iva Budařová / (Czechoslovakia) Marcela Skuherská (first round)

== Draw ==
=== Key ===
- Q = Qualifier
- WC = Wild card
- LL = Lucky loser
- Alt = Alternate
- SE = Special exempt
- PR = Protected ranking
- ITF = ITF entry
- JE = Junior exempt
- w/o = Walkover
- r = Retired
- d = Defaulted
- SR = Special ranking

=== Final ===
Final
4	(United States) Kathy Jordan (United States) Paula Smith	4	**6**	2
2	(United States) **Barbara Potter** (United States) **Sharon Walsh**	**6**	4	**6**

=== Top half ===
First round
1	(United States) **R Casals** (Australia) **W Turnbull**	**6**	**6**
(Australia) C O'Neil (Australia) P Whytcross	3	2
(Switzerland) **P Delhees** (Netherlands) **M Mesker**	**6**	**6**
(United States) L duPont (United States) N Yeargin	3	1
(South Africa) **R Fairbank** (Netherlands) **B Stöve**	**6**	**6**
(United States) Z Garrison (United States) S Mascarin	1	2
(Australia) D Fromholtz (Hungary) A Temesvári	**6**	6	3
5	(Czechoslovakia) **H Mandlíková** (Romania) **V Ruzici**	3	**7**	**6**
4	(United States) **K Jordan** (United States) **P Smith**	**7**	**6**
(United States) P Casale (United States) K Sands	6	1
(United States) S Margolin (United States) K Jones-Shaefer	4	1
(United States) **B Nagelsen** (United States) **K Rinaldi**	**6**	**6**
(South Korea) **D-H Lee** (Romania) **L Romanov**	**7**	**7**
(United Kingdom) D Jarrett (Czechoslovakia) K Skronská	6	6
(United States) F Raschiatore (United States) K Steinmetz	**6**	2	3
7	(Brazil) **P Medrado** (Brazil) **C Monteiro**	2	**6**	**6**

Second round
1	(United States) **R Casals** (Australia) **W Turnbull**	**6**	**6**
(Switzerland) P Delhees (Netherlands) M Mesker	4	3
(South Africa) R Fairbank (Netherlands) B Stöve	1	2
5	(Czechoslovakia) **H Mandlíková** (Romania) **V Ruzici**	**6**	**6**
4	(United States) **K Jordan** (United States) **P Smith**	**6**	**6**
(United States) B Nagelsen (United States) K Rinaldi	3	1
(South Korea) **D-H Lee** (Romania) **L Romanov**	**7**	3	**6**
7	(Brazil) P Medrado (Brazil) C Monteiro	5	**6**	2

Quarterfinals
1	(United States) R Casals (Australia) W Turnbull	**6**	5	4
5	(Czechoslovakia) **H Mandlíková** (Romania) **V Ruzici**	1	**7**	**6**
4	(United States) **K Jordan** (United States) **P Smith**	**6**	**7**
(South Korea) D-H Lee (Romania) L Romanov	3	5

Semifinals
5	(Czechoslovakia) H Mandlíková (Romania) V Ruzici	**7**	4	4
4	(United States) **K Jordan** (United States) **P Smith**	6	**6**	**6**

=== Bottom half ===
First round
8	(Czechoslovakia) I Budařová (Czechoslovakia) M Skuherská	2	**6**	5
(United States) **L Antonoplis** (United States) **B Jordan**	**6**	3	**7**
(United States) **A Leand** (Italy) **S Simmonds**	**6**	**6**
(United States) C Benjamin (France) C Vanier	1	4
(United States) L-A Thompson (United States) W White	**7**	2	2
(United States) **L Bonder** (United States) **B Herr**	6	**6**	**6**
(United States) **J Russell** (United States) **A White**	**6**	**7**
3	(United States) K Horvath (South Africa) Y Vermaak	4	6
6	(United States) **A Jaeger** (United States) **M-L Piatek**	**6**	**7**
(United States) J Harrington (United States) V Nelson	0	5
(United Kingdom) **A Hobbs** (Australia) **S Leo**	**6**	**6**
(Peru) L Arraya (Switzerland) H Strachoňová	2	3
(United States) L Allen (United States) L Forood	5	3
(Czechoslovakia) **H Suková** (France) **C Tanvier**	**7**	**6**
(United States) B Hallquist (United States) A Henricksson	5	1
2	(United States) **B Potter** (United States) **S Walsh**	**7**	**6**

Second round
(United States) **L Antonoplis** (United States) **B Jordan**	**7**	**6**
(United States) A Leand (Italy) S Simmonds	6	2
(United States) L Bonder (United States) B Herr	4	1
(United States) **J Russell** (United States) **A White**	**6**	**6**
6	(United States) A Jaeger (United States) M-L Piatek	3	4
(United Kingdom) **A Hobbs** (Australia) **S Leo**	**6**	**6**
(Czechoslovakia) H Suková (France) C Tanvier	3	6
2	(United States) **B Potter** (United States) **S Walsh**	**6**	**7**

Quarterfinals
(United States) **L Antonoplis** (United States) **B Jordan**	**6**	**7**
(United States) J Russell (United States) A White	4	5
(United Kingdom) A Hobbs (Australia) S Leo	3	**7**	6
2	(United States) **B Potter** (United States) **S Walsh**	**6**	6	**7**

Semifinals
(United States) L Antonoplis (United States) B Jordan	5	5
2	(United States) **B Potter** (United States) **S Walsh**	**7**	**7**
