= 1983 Avon Cup – Doubles =

Doubles
- 1983 Avon Cup

Final
- Champions: (United States) Andrea Jaeger (United States) Mary-Lou Piatek
- Runners-up: (United States) Rosemary Casals (Australia) Wendy Turnbull
- Score: 7–5, 6–4

Details
- Draw: 32
- Seeds: 8

Events
Singles	Doubles
Avon Cup	· 1984 →

Andrea Jaeger and Mary-Lou Piatek won in the final 7–5, 6–4 against Rosemary Casals and Wendy Turnbull.

== Seeds ==
Champion seeds are indicated in bold text while text in italics indicates the round in which those seeds were eliminated.

1. (United States) Rosemary Casals / (Australia) Wendy Turnbull (final)
2. (United States) Barbara Potter / (United States) Sharon Walsh (first round)
3. (United States) Kathy Jordan / (United States) Paula Smith (semifinals)
4. (United States) Kathleen Horvath / (South Africa) Yvonne Vermaak (semifinals)
5. (Czechoslovakia) Hana Mandlíková / (Romania) Virginia Ruzici (first round)
6. (United States) **Andrea Jaeger** / (United States) **Mary-Lou Piatek (champions)**
7. (United States) Betsy Nagelsen / (United Kingdom) Virginia Wade (first round)
8. (Czechoslovakia) Iva Budařová / (Czechoslovakia) Marcela Skuherská (first round)

== Draw ==
=== Key ===
- Q = Qualifier
- WC = Wild card
- LL = Lucky loser
- Alt = Alternate
- SE = Special exempt
- PR = Protected ranking
- ITF = ITF entry
- JE = Junior exempt
- w/o = Walkover
- r = Retired
- d = Defaulted
- SR = Special ranking

=== Final ===
Final
1	(United States) Rosemary Casals (Australia) Wendy Turnbull	5	4
8	(United States) **Andrea Jaeger** (United States) **Mary-Lou Piatek**	**7**	**6**

=== Top half ===
First round
1	(United States) **R Casals** (Australia) **W Turnbull**	**6**	**6**
(United States) P Barg (United States) L Bonder	3	3
(United States) **K Rinaldi** (United States) **P Teeguarden**	**6**	**7**
(Switzerland) P Delhees (Czechoslovakia) K Skronská	4	6
(South Korea) D-H Lee (Romania) L Romanov	2	**6**	4
(United States) **C Benjamin** (France) **C Vanier**	**6**	2	**6**
(United States) **P Casale** (United States) **K Sands**	**7**	**7**
5	(Czechoslovakia) H Mandlíková (Romania) V Ruzici	6	5
4	(United States) **K Horvath** (South Africa) **Y Vermaak**	**7**	**6**
(United Kingdom) A Hobbs (Australia) S Leo	6	4
(Czechoslovakia) H Suková (France) C Tanvier	**6**	4	4
(United States) **L Allen** (United States) **L Forood**	4	**6**	**6**
(Peru) L Arraya (Switzerland) H Strachoňová	2	1
(Australia) **C O'Neil** (Australia) **P Whytcross**	**6**	**6**
(Australia) **D Fromholtz** (Hungary) **A Temesvári**	**6**	**6**
7	(United States) B Nagelsen (United Kingdom) V Wade	3	3

Second round
1	(United States) **R Casals** (Australia) **W Turnbull**	**6**	**6**
(United States) K Rinaldi (United States) P Teeguarden	0	4
(United States) C Benjamin (France) C Vanier	3	**6**	0
(United States) **P Casale** (United States) **K Sands**	**6**	1	**6**
4	(United States) **K Horvath** (South Africa) **Y Vermaak**	**6**	**6**
(United States) L Allen (United States) L Forood	0	3
(Australia) C O'Neil (Australia) P Whytcross	3	5
(Australia) **D Fromholtz** (Hungary) **A Temesvári**	**6**	**7**

Quarterfinals
1	(United States) **R Casals** (Australia) **W Turnbull**	**6**	5	**6**
(United States) P Casale (United States) K Sands	2	**7**	2
4	(United States) **K Horvath** (South Africa) **Y Vermaak**	2	**7**	**7**
(Australia) D Fromholtz (Hungary) A Temesvári	**6**	6	6

Semifinals
1	(United States) **R Casals** (Australia) **W Turnbull**	**6**	**6**
4	(United States) K Horvath (South Africa) Y Vermaak	3	3

=== Bottom half ===
First round
8	(Czechoslovakia) I Budařová (Czechoslovakia) M Skuherská	5	4
(United States) **J Russell** (United States) **A White**	**7**	**6**
(United States) B Hallquist (United States) A Henricksson	4	4
(South Africa) **R Fairbank** (Netherlands) **B Stöve**	**6**	**6**
(United States) **L-A Thompson** (United States) **W White**	**6**	2	**7**
(United States) J Davis (United States) L duPont	4	**6**	5
(United States) J Harrington (United States) V Nelson	2	0
3	(United States) **K Jordan** (United States) **P Smith**	**6**	**6**
6	(United States) **A Jaeger** (United States) **M-L Piatek**	**6**	**6**
(United States) K Jones-Shaefer (Italy) S Simmonds	2	1
(South Africa) I Kloss (Brazil) C Monteiro	3	3
(Netherlands) **M Mesker** (United States) **A Moulton**	**6**	**6**
(United States) **Z Garrison** (United States) **S Mascarin**	**6**	**6**
(United States) J Klitch (United States) S Margolin	3	1
(United States) **L Antonoplis** (United States) **B Jordan**	**6**	2	**6**
2	(United States) B Potter (United States) S Walsh	1	**6**	2

Second round
(United States) J Russell (United States) A White	4	**6**	4
(South Africa) **R Fairbank** (Netherlands) **B Stöve**	**6**	4	**6**
(United States) L-A Thompson (United States) W White	2	1
3	(United States) **K Jordan** (United States) **P Smith**	**6**	**6**
6	(United States) **A Jaeger** (United States) **M-L Piatek**	6	**6**	**6**
(Netherlands) M Mesker (United States) A Moulton	**7**	3	3
(United States) Z Garrison (United States) S Mascarin	3	1
(United States) **L Antonoplis** (United States) **B Jordan**	**6**	**6**

Quarterfinals
(South Africa) R Fairbank (Netherlands) B Stöve	3	3
3	(United States) **K Jordan** (United States) **P Smith**	**6**	**6**
6	(United States) **A Jaeger** (United States) **M-L Piatek**	**6**	**7**
(United States) L Antonoplis (United States) B Jordan	4	5

Semifinals
3	(United States) K Jordan (United States) P Smith	3	3
6	(United States) **A Jaeger** (United States) **M-L Piatek**	**6**	**6**
