= 1984 Avon Cup – Doubles =

Doubles
- 1984 Avon Cup

Final
- Champions: (Czechoslovakia) Hana Mandlíková (Czechoslovakia) Helena Suková
- Runners-up: (United Kingdom) Anne Hobbs (United States) Andrea Jaeger
- Score: 3–6, 6–2, 6–2

Details
- Draw: 16
- Seeds: 4

Events
Singles	Doubles
← 1983 ·	Avon Cup	· 1985 →

Andrea Jaeger and Mary Lou Piatek were the defending champions, but Piatek did not compete this year.

Jaeger teamed up with Anne Hobbs and lost in the final to Hana Mandlíková and Helena Suková. The score was 3–6, 6–2, 6–2.

== Seeds ==
1. (United States) Bonnie Gadusek / (United States) Wendy White (quarterfinals)
2. (United Kingdom) Anne Hobbs / (United States) Andrea Jaeger (final)
3. (United States) JoAnne Russell / (Romania) Virginia Ruzici (first round)
4. (United States) Leslie Allen / (Socialist Federal Republic of Yugoslavia) Mima Jaušovec (semifinals)

== Draw ==
=== Key ===
- Q = Qualifier
- WC = Wild card
- LL = Lucky loser
- Alt = Alternate
- SE = Special exempt
- PR = Protected ranking
- ITF = ITF entry
- JE = Junior exempt
- w/o = Walkover
- r = Retired
- d = Defaulted
- SR = Special ranking

=== Draw ===
First round
1	(United States) B Gadusek (United States) W White	7	6
(United States) R Casals (United States) P Teeguarden	6	4
(United States) B Herr (United Kingdom) V Wade	5	7	3
(Czechoslovakia) H Mandlíková (Czechoslovakia) H Suková	7	5	6
3	(United States) J Russell (Romania) V Ruzici	3	6
(United States) Z Garrison (United States) L McNeil	6	7
(United States) G Purdy (Italy) R Reggi	6	6
(United States) P Casale (Argentina) I Madruga	3	3
(Czechoslovakia) I Budařová (Bulgaria) M Maleeva	6	5	6
(United States) C Benjamin (France) C Vanier	2	7	4
(Australia) A Minter (Italy) S Simmonds	7	3	2
4	(United States) L Allen (Socialist Federal Republic of Yugoslavia) M Jaušovec	5	6	6
(Australia) C O'Neil (Australia) P Whytcross	3	4
(Canada) C Bassett (United States) K Horvath	6	6
(France) S Amiach (Peru) L Gildemeister	6	2
2	(United Kingdom) A Hobbs (United States) A Jaeger	7	6

Quarterfinals
1	(United States) B Gadusek (United States) W White	6	6
(Czechoslovakia) H Mandlíková (Czechoslovakia) H Suková	7	7
(United States) Z Garrison (United States) L McNeil	6	6
(United States) G Purdy (Italy) R Reggi	4	3
(Czechoslovakia) I Budařová (Bulgaria) M Maleeva	6	3	6
4	(United States) L Allen (Socialist Federal Republic of Yugoslavia) M Jaušovec	3	6	7
(Canada) C Bassett (United States) K Horvath	2	4
2	(United Kingdom) A Hobbs (United States) A Jaeger	6	6

Semifinals
(Czechoslovakia) H Mandlíková (Czechoslovakia) H Suková	5	6	6
(United States) Z Garrison (United States) L McNeil	7	2	1
4	(United States) L Allen (Socialist Federal Republic of Yugoslavia) M Jaušovec	7	2	1
2	(United Kingdom) A Hobbs (United States) A Jaeger	5	6	6

Final
(Czechoslovakia) H Mandlíková (Czechoslovakia) H Suková	3	6	6
2	(United Kingdom) A Hobbs (United States) A Jaeger	6	2	2
