= 1983 Avon Cup – Singles =

Singles
- 1983 Avon Cup

Final
- Champion: (United States) Andrea Jaeger
- Runner-up: (Czechoslovakia) Hana Mandlíková
- Score: 6–1, 6–3

Details
- Draw: 56
- Seeds: 16

Events
| Singles | Doubles |
| Avon Cup | · 1984 → |

Andrea Jaeger won in the final 6–1, 6–3 against Hana Mandlíková.

== Seeds ==
A champion seed is indicated in bold text while text in italics indicates the round in which that seed was eliminated. The top nine seeds received a bye to the second round.

1. (United States) **Andrea Jaeger (champion)**
2. (Australia) Wendy Turnbull (second round)
3. (Czechoslovakia) Hana Mandlíková (final)
4. (Romania) Virginia Ruzici (quarterfinals)
5. n/a
6. (United States) Zina Garrison (quarterfinals)
7. (United States) Kathy Rinaldi (quarterfinals)
8. n/a
9. (South Africa) Rosalyn Fairbank (second round)
10. (Australia) Evonne Goolagong Cawley (second round)
11. n/a
12. (United States) Kathy Jordan (second round)
13. (United States) JoAnne Russell (third round)
14. (France) Catherine Tanvier (second round)
15. (South Africa) Yvonne Vermaak (first round)
16. (Czechoslovakia) Helena Suková (third round)

== Draw ==
=== Key ===
- Q = Qualifier
- WC = Wild card
- LL = Lucky loser
- Alt = Alternate
- SE = Special exempt
- PR = Protected ranking
- ITF = ITF entry
- JE = Junior exempt
- w/o = Walkover
- r = Retired
- d = Defaulted
- SR = Special ranking

=== Finals ===
Semifinals
1 | (United States) **Andrea Jaeger** | **6** | **6**
(Hungary) Andrea Temesvári | 3 | 2
3 | (Czechoslovakia) **Hana Mandlíková** | **6** | **6**
(United States) Michelle Torres | 4 | 4

Final
1 | (United States) **Andrea Jaeger** | **6** | **6**
3 | (Czechoslovakia) Hana Mandlíková | 1 | 3

=== Top half ===
==== Section 1 ====
First round
(France) **C Vanier** | **6** | **6**
Q | (United States) S Solomon | 4 | 3
(Czechoslovakia) I Budařová | 3 | 2
(Bulgaria) **M Maleeva** | **6** | **6**
(United States) B Nagelsen | 6 | **7** | 2
13 | (United States) **J Russell** | **7** | 6 | **6**
15 | (South Africa) Y Vermaak | 4 | 1
(Australia) **D Fromholtz** | **6** | **6**
(United States) **P Casale** | **6** | **6**
(Australia) S Leo | 4 | 1
Q | (United States) P Smith | 2 | 3
(United States) **S Mascarin** | **6** | **6**

Second round
1 | (United States) **A Jaeger** | **7** | **6**
(France) C Vanier | 5 | 1
(Bulgaria) M Maleeva | 2 | **6** | 3
13 | (United States) **J Russell** | **6** | 2 | **6**
(Australia) **D Fromholtz** | **6** | **6**
(United States) P Casale | 2 | 2
(United States) **S Mascarin** | **6** | **7**
9 | (South Africa) R Fairbank | 4 | 6

Third round
1 | (United States) **A Jaeger** | **6** | **6**
13 | (United States) J Russell | 3 | 1
(Australia) **D Fromholtz** | **6** | **6**
(United States) S Mascarin | 4 | 2

Quarterfinals
1 | (United States) **A Jaeger** | **6** | **6**
(Australia) D Fromholtz | 4 | 2

==== Section 2 ====
First round
(Switzerland) **P Delhees** | 4 | **6** | **6**
(Romania) L Romanov | **6** | 2 | 4
Q | (United States) K Steinmetz | **6** | 1 | 4
(United States) **K Horvath** | 1 | **6** | **6**
(United States) A White | 4 | 4
16 | (Czechoslovakia) **H Suková** | **6** | **6**
(United States) M L Piatek | 2 | 1
(Hungary) **A Temesvári** | **6** | **6**
(United Kingdom) V Wade | 4 | 5
(Peru) **L Arraya** | **6** | **7**
Q | (United States) **T Phelps** | 3 | **6** | **6**
(United States) B Hallquist | **6** | 2 | 4

Second round
4 | (Romania) **V Ruzici** | **6** | **6**
(Switzerland) P Delhees | 1 | 2
(United States) K Horvath | 3 | 5
16 | (Czechoslovakia) **H Suková** | **6** | **7**
(Hungary) **A Temesvári** | **6** | 3 | **6**
(Peru) L Arraya | 1 | **6** | 3
Q | (United States) **T Phelps** | **6** | **6**
LL | (United States) J Klitch | 1 | 1

Third round
4 | (Romania) **V Ruzici** | **7** | **6**
16 | (Czechoslovakia) H Suková | 5 | 0
(Hungary) **A Temesvári** | **6** | **6**
Q | (United States) T Phelps | 4 | 4

Quarterfinals
4 | (Romania) V Ruzici | 3 | 2
(Hungary) **A Temesvári** | **6** | **6**

=== Bottom half ===
==== Section 3 ====
First round
(United States) **V Nelson** | **6** | **6**
Q | (United States) L Forood | 0 | 3
(United States) M Werdel | 2 | 6
(Netherlands) **M Mesker** | **6** | **7**
(United States) A Moulton | **6** | 1 | 4
12 | (United States) **K Jordan** | 3 | **6** | **6**
14 | (France) **C Tanvier** | 0 | **6** | **6**
(United States) W White | **6** | 1 | 3
(United States) **C Benjamin** | **6** | **6**
Q | (Italy) R Reggi | 3 | 3
LL | (Switzerland) C Pasquale | 1 | 4
(Brazil) **C Monteiro** | **6** | **6**

Second round
6 | (United States) **Z Garrison** | **6** | **6**
(United States) V Nelson | 2 | 1
(Netherlands) **M Mesker** | **6** | **6**
12 | (United States) K Jordan | 1 | 2
14 | (France) C Tanvier | 2 | 3
(United States) **C Benjamin** | **6** | **6**
(Brazil) C Monteiro | 0 | 1
3 | (Czechoslovakia) **H Mandlíková** | **6** | **6**

Third round
6 | (United States) **Z Garrison** | **6** | **6**
(Netherlands) M Mesker | 2 | 4
(United States) C Benjamin | 1 | 4
3 | (Czechoslovakia) **H Mandlíková** | **6** | **6**

Quarterfinals
6 | (United States) Z Garrison | 3 | 4
3 | (Czechoslovakia) **H Mandlíková** | **6** | **6**

==== Section 4 ====
First round
(United States) B Jordan | 2 | **6** | 2
(South Korea) **D-H Lee** | **6** | 2 | **6**
(United States) **L-A Thompson** | **7** | **6**
(United States) P Teeguarden | 6 | 4
Q | (Switzerland) H Strachoňová | 6 | 1
10 | (Australia) **E Goolagong Cawley** | **7** | **6**
LL | (United States) D Gilbert | 4 | 3
(United States) **L Antonoplis** | **6** | **6**
Q | (United States) K Sands | **6** | 2 | 5
(Italy) **S Simmonds** | 1 | **6** | **7**
(United States) **M Torres** | **6** | **6**
(United States) L Bonder | 4 | 2

Second round
7 | (United States) **K Rinaldi** | **7** | **6**
(South Korea) D-H Lee | 6 | 0
(United States) **L-A Thompson** | **6** | **7**
10 | (Australia) E Goolagong Cawley | 0 | 5
(United States) **L Antonoplis** | 5 | **6** | **7**
(Italy) S Simmonds | **7** | 4 | 5
(United States) **M Torres** | **6** | **7**
2 | (Australia) W Turnbull | 3 | 5

Third round
7 | (United States) **K Rinaldi** | **6** | **6**
(United States) L-A Thompson | 2 | 0
(United States) L Antonoplis | 1 | 1
(United States) **M Torres** | **6** | **6**

Quarterfinals
7 | (United States) K Rinaldi | **6** | 5 | 4
(United States) **M Torres** | 3 | **7** | **6**
