= 1983 Murjani Cup =

- Date: January 30 – February 6
- Edition: 2nd
- Prize money: $150,000
- Surface: Clay / outdoors
- Location: Palm Beach, Florida, U.S.

Champions

Singles
- (United States) Chris Evert-Lloyd

Doubles
- (United States) Barbara Potter / (United States) Sharon Walsh
- Murjani Cup

The 1983 Murjani Cup was a women's tennis tournament played on outdoor clay courts in Palm Beach, Florida in the United States that was part of the 1983 Virginia Slims World Championship Series. The tournament was held from January 30 through February 6, 1983. Chris Evert-Lloyd won the singles title.

== Finals ==
=== Singles ===
(United States) Chris Evert-Lloyd defeated (United States) Andrea Jaeger 6–3, 6–3

- It was Evert-Lloyd's 1st title of the year and the 125th of her career.

=== Doubles ===
(United States) Barbara Potter / (United States) Sharon Walsh defeated (United States) Kathy Jordan / (United States) Paula Smith 6–4, 4–6, 6–2

- It was Potter's 1st title of the year and the 7th of her career. It was Walsh's 1st title of the year and the 1st of her career.
