= 1987 Belgian Open =

Tennis tournament

- Date: 6–12 July
- Edition: 1st
- Category: Category 1+
- Draw: 32S / 16D
- Prize money: $75,000
- Surface: Clay / outdoor
- Location: Knokke-Le-Zoute, Belgium

Champions

Singles
- (United States) Kathleen Horvath

Doubles
- (West Germany) Bettina Bunge / (Bulgaria) Manuela Maleeva
- Belgian Open

The 1987 Belgian Open was a women's tennis tournament played on outdoor clay courts in Knokke-Le-Zoute, Belgium and was part of the Category 1+ tier of the 1987 Virginia Slims World Championship Series. It was the inaugural edition of the tournament and was held from 6 July until 12 July 1987. Seventh-seeded Kathleen Horvath won the singles final.

== Finals ==
=== Singles ===
(United States) Kathleen Horvath defeated (West Germany) Bettina Bunge 6–1, 7–6^{(7–5)}

- It was Horvath's only singles title of the year and the 6th and last of her career.

=== Doubles ===
(West Germany) Bettina Bunge / (Bulgaria) Manuela Maleeva defeated (United States) Kathleen Horvath / (Netherlands) Marcella Mesker 4–6, 6–4, 6–4
