= 1983 Murjani Cup – Singles =

Singles
- 1983 Murjani Cup
- 1982 Champion: (United States) Chris Evert-Lloyd

Final
- Champion: (United States) Chris Evert-Lloyd
- Runner-up: (United States) Andrea Jaeger
- Score: 6–3, 6–3

Events
Singles	Doubles
← 1982 ·	Murjani Cup	· 1984 →

Chris Evert-Lloyd was the defending champion and won in the final 6–3, 6–3 against Andrea Jaeger.

== Seeds ==
A champion seed is indicated in bold text while text in italics indicates the round in which that seed was eliminated. The top eight seeds received a bye to the second round.

1. (United States) **Chris Evert-Lloyd (champion)**
2. (United States) Andrea Jaeger (final)
3. (Australia) Wendy Turnbull (semifinals)
4. (Czechoslovakia) Hana Mandlíková (semifinals)
5. (Romania) Virginia Ruzici (second round)
6. (United States) Zina Garrison (quarterfinals)
7. (United States) Kathy Rinaldi (third round)
8. (South Africa) Rosalyn Fairbank (quarterfinals)
9. n/a
10. (United States) Andrea Leand (third round)
11. (United States) Kathy Jordan (second round)
12. (United States) Leslie Allen (second round)
13. (United States) JoAnne Russell (third round)
14. (France) Catherine Tanvier (first round)
15. n/a
16. n/a

== Draw ==
=== Key ===
- Q = Qualifier
- WC = Wild card
- LL = Lucky loser
- Alt = Alternate
- SE = Special exempt
- PR = Protected ranking
- ITF = ITF entry
- JE = Junior exempt
- w/o = Walkover
- r = Retired
- d = Defaulted
- SR = Special ranking

=== Finals ===
Semifinals
1	(United States) **Chris Evert-Lloyd**	**6**	**6**
3	(Australia) Wendy Turnbull	1	1
4	(Czechoslovakia) Hana Mandlíková	2	4
2	(United States) **Andrea Jaeger**	**6**	**6**

Final
1	(United States) **Chris Evert-Lloyd**	**6**	**6**
2	(United States) Andrea Jaeger	2	2

=== Top half ===
==== Section 1 ====
First round
(United States) **K Horvath**	**6**	**6**
(United States) M Torres	3	1
(South Africa) **Y Vermaak**	1	**7**	**6**
(Australia) D Fromholtz	**6**	6	4
(France) C Vanier	1	3
11	(United States) **K Jordan**	**6**	**6**
Q	(United States) **S Solomon**	**6**	**6**
(Romania) L Romanov	1	0
(Hungary) **A Temesvári**	**6**	**6**
(United States) P Casale	1	3
Q	(United Kingdom) A Hobbs	5	4
(United States) **V Nelson**	**7**	**6**

Second round
1	(United States) **C Evert-Lloyd**	**6**	**6**
(United States) K Horvath	2	3
(South Africa) **Y Vermaak**	**7**	**6**
11	(United States) K Jordan	6	1
Q	(United States) S Solomon	0	1
(Hungary) **A Temesvári**	**6**	**6**
(United States) V Nelson	3	**7**	3
7	(United States) **K Rinaldi**	**6**	5	**6**

Third round
1	(United States) **C Evert-Lloyd**	3	**6**	**6**
(South Africa) Y Vermaak	**6**	0	0
(Hungary) **A Temesvári**	**6**	**7**
7	(United States) K Rinaldi	3	6

Quarterfinals
1	(United States) **C Evert-Lloyd**	**6**	**6**
(Hungary) A Temesvári	3	0

==== Section 2 ====
First round
(United States) **B Herr**	**6**	**7**
(Czechoslovakia) H Suková	2	5
(Brazil) C Monteiro	**6**	6	3
(United States) **L Bonder**	4	**7**	**6**
Q	(United States) L Antonoplis	5	2
10	(United States) **A Leand**	**7**	**6**
14	(France) C Tanvier	1	0
Q	(United States) **T Phelps**	**6**	**6**
(Peru) L Arraya	0	4
(Czechoslovakia) **I Budařová**	**6**	**6**
(Czechoslovakia) K Skronská	3	4
(United States) **A White**	**6**	**6**

Second round
3	(Australia) **W Turnbull**	4	**6**	**6**
(United States) B Herr	**6**	4	1
(United States) L Bonder	**6**	2	5
10	(United States) **A Leand**	4	**6**	**7**
Q	(United States) T Phelps	4	1
(Czechoslovakia) **I Budařová**	**6**	**6**
(United States) **A White**	**6**	6	**7**
5	(Romania) V Ruzici	3	**7**	5

Third round
3	(Australia) **W Turnbull**	**6**	**6**
10	(United States) A Leand	1	1
(Czechoslovakia) **I Budařová**	**7**	**6**
(United States) A White	6	3

Quarterfinals
3	(Australia) **W Turnbull**	**6**	**6**
(Czechoslovakia) I Budařová	0	1

=== Bottom half ===
==== Section 3 ====
First round
(United States) L-A Thompson	3	**6**	5
(United States) **W White**	**6**	3	**7**
(South Africa) S Rollinson	2	1
(Switzerland) **P Delhees**	**6**	**6**
(Italy) **S Simmonds**	**6**	4	**6**
(United States) C Benjamin	3	**6**	2
LL	(Australia) C O'Neil	2	5
(United States) **R Casals**	**6**	**7**
(United States) D Gilbert	4	3
(United States) **B Nagelsen**	**6**	**6**
Q	(United States) **J Klitch**	**6**	0	**6**
Q	(United States) K Jones-Shaefer	4	**6**	4

Second round
8	(South Africa) **R Fairbank**	**6**	**6**
(United States) W White	1	3
(Switzerland) P Delhees	0	6
(Italy) **S Simmonds**	**6**	**7**
(United States) R Casals	3	4
(United States) **B Nagelsen**	**6**	**6**
Q	(United States) J Klitch	2	3
4	(Czechoslovakia) **H Mandlíková**	**6**	**6**

Third round
8	(South Africa) **R Fairbank**	**6**	**6**
(Italy) S Simmonds	2	0
(United States) B Nagelsen	3	2
4	(Czechoslovakia) **H Mandlíková**	**6**	**6**

Quarterfinals
8	(South Africa) R Fairbank	0	1
4	(Czechoslovakia) **H Mandlíková**	**6**	**6**

==== Section 4 ====
First round
Q	(Australia) S Leo	3	4
(Bulgaria) **M Maleeva**	**6**	**6**
(United States) **A Holton**	**6**	**6**
(Brazil) P Medrado	2	1
(Netherlands) M Mesker	6	5
12	(United States) **Leslie Allen**	**7**	**7**
13	(United States) **J Russell**	**6**	**6**
(South Korea) D-H Lee	2	1
(United States) Louise Allen	1	2
(United States) **S Mascarin**	**6**	**6**
(United States) B Hallquist	5	2
LL	(United States) **P Smith**	**7**	**6**

Second round
6	(United States) **Z Garrison**	**6**	**7**
(Bulgaria) M Maleeva	1	5
(United States) **A Holton**	5	**6**	**6**
12	(United States) Leslie Allen	**7**	3	1
13	(United States) **J Russell**	**6**	**6**
(United States) S Mascarin	3	3
LL	(United States) P Smith	1	1
2	(United States) **A Jaeger**	**6**	**6**

Third round
6	(United States) **Z Garrison**	**6**	**6**
(United States) A Holton	1	2
13	(United States) J Russell	4	2
2	(United States) **A Jaeger**	**6**	**6**

Quarterfinals
6	(United States) Z Garrison	1	1
2	(United States) **A Jaeger**	**6**	**6**
