= 1984 Avon Cup =

- Date: January 23–29
- Edition: 2nd
- Draw: 32S / 16D
- Prize money: $100,000
- Surface: Clay / outdoor
- Location: Marco Island, Florida, U.S.

Champions

Singles
- (United States) Bonnie Gadusek

Doubles
- (Czechoslovakia) Hana Mandlíková / (Czechoslovakia) Helena Suková
← 1983 ·	Avon Cup	· 1985 →

The 1984 Avon Cup was a women's tennis tournament played on outdoor clay courts in Marco Island, Florida in the United States that was part of the 1983–84 Virginia Slims World Championship Series (Note: The 1983 Virginia Slims World Championship Series ran from January 1983 through February 1984.). It was the second edition of the tournament and was held from January 28 through February 3, 1985. Fifth-seeded Bonnie Gadusek won the singles title.

== Finals ==
=== Singles ===
(United States) Bonnie Gadusek defeated (United States) Kathleen Horvath 3–6, 6–0, 6–4

- It was Gadusek's only singles title of the year and the 1st of her career.

=== Doubles ===
(Czechoslovakia) Hana Mandlíková / (Czechoslovakia) Helena Suková defeated (United Kingdom) Anne Hobbs / (United States) Andrea Jaeger 3–6, 6–2, 6–2

- It was Mandlíková's 3rd title of the year and the 23rd of her career. It was Suková's 1st title of the year and the 2nd of her career.
