= Carlos Landó =

Argentine tennis player

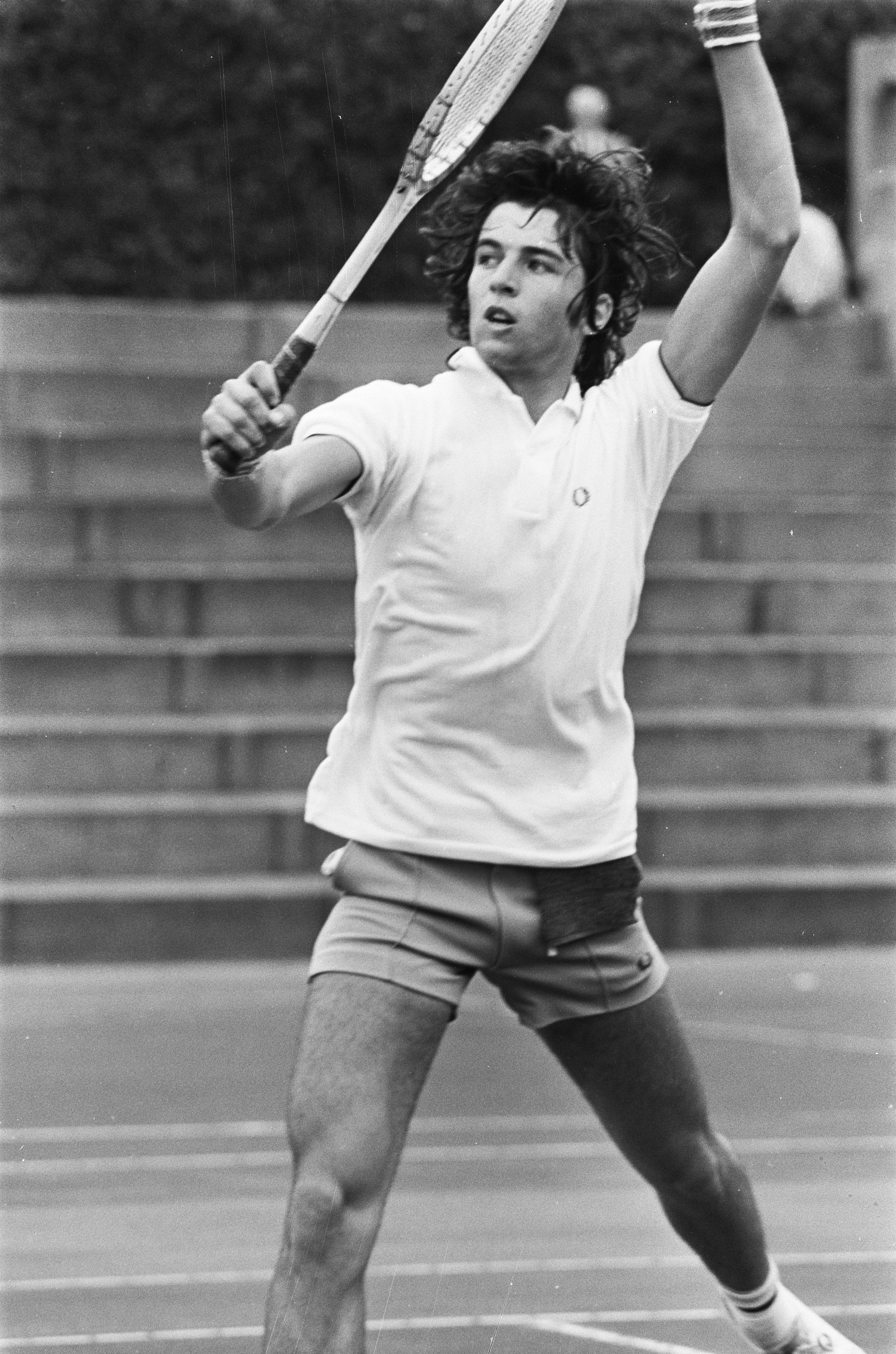
- Country (sports): Argentina
- Plays: Right-handed

Singles
- Career record: 1–7
- Highest ranking: No. 229 (16 Jan 1978)

Doubles
- Career record: 1–9
- Highest ranking: No. 672 (2 Jan 1984)

Grand Slam doubles results
- French Open: 1R (1982)

Carlos Landó is an Argentine former professional tennis player.

Landó, a world number 229 in singles, was runner-up to Carlos Kirmayr at the Rio de Janeiro Challenger in 1980. His only Challenger title came in doubles, partnering Roberto Carruthers, with whom he featured in the men's doubles main draw at the 1982 French Open. He is also known as "Picha" Lando.

== ATP Challenger titles ==
=== Doubles: (1) ===
No.	Date	Tournament	Surface	Partner	Opponents	Score
1.	Feb 1981	Río de la Plata Challenger; Buenos Aires, Argentina	Clay	(Argentina) Roberto Carruthers	(United States) Charles Strode (United States) Morris Strode	0–6, 6–1, 6–3
