= 1982 French Open – Women's singles =

Women's singles
- 1982 French Open

Final
- Champion: (United States) Martina Navratilova
- Runner-up: (United States) Andrea Jaeger
- Score: 7–6^{(8–6)}, 6–1

Details
- Draw: 96
- Seeds: 16

Events
Singles	men	women		boys	girls
Doubles	men	women	mixed	boys	girls
WC Singles	men	women	quad
WC Doubles	men	women	quad
Legends	−45	45+	women
- French Open

Martina Navratilova defeated Andrea Jaeger in the final, 7–6^{(8–6)}, 6–1 to win the women's singles tennis title at the 1982 French Open. It was her first French Open singles title and fourth major singles title overall.

Hana Mandlíková was the defending champion, but was defeated in the semifinals by Navratilova. Four-time champion Chris Evert was defeated by Jaeger in the semifinals.

== Seeds ==
The seeded players are listed below. Martina Navratilova is the champion; others show the round in which they were eliminated.

1. (United States) Chris Evert (semifinals)
2. (United States) Martina Navratilova (champion)
3. (United States) Tracy Austin (quarterfinals)
4. (United States) Andrea Jaeger (finalist)
5. (Czechoslovakia) Hana Mandlíková (semifinals)
6. (West Germany) Sylvia Hanika (second round)
7. (Socialist Federal Republic of Yugoslavia) Mima Jaušovec (fourth round)
8. (United States) Anne Smith (fourth round)
9. (West Germany) Bettina Bunge (second round)
10. (United States) Billie Jean King (third round)
11. (Romania) Virginia Ruzici (quarterfinals)
12. (United States) Andrea Leand (fourth round)
13. n/a
14. (United States) Mary-Lou Piatek (second round)
15. (United States) Kathy Rinaldi (fourth round)
16. (United States) Pam Casale (fourth round)

== Draw ==
Key

- Q = Qualifier
- WC = Wild card
- LL = Lucky loser
- Alt = Alternate
- ITF = ITF entry
- PR = Protected ranking
- SR = Special ranking
- SE = Special exempt
- JE = Junior exempt
- JR = Junior Accelerator Programme entrant
- CO = College Accelerator Programme entrant
- NG = Next Gen Accelerator Program entrant
- w/o = Walkover
- r = Retired
- d = Defaulted

=== Finals ===
Quarterfinals
1	(United States) Chris Evert	6	6
(Romania) Lucia Romanov	2	4
4	(United States) Andrea Jaeger	6	6
11	(Romania) Virginia Ruzici	1	0
5	(Czechoslovakia) Hana Mandlíková	7	6	6
3	(United States) Tracy Austin	6	7	2
(United States) Zina Garrison	3	2
2	(United States) Martina Navratilova	6	6

Semifinals
1	(United States) Chris Evert	3	1
4	(United States) Andrea Jaeger	6	6
5	(Czechoslovakia) Hana Mandlíková	0	2
2	(United States) Martina Navratilova	6	6

Finals
4	(United States) Andrea Jaeger	6^{6}	1
2	(United States) Martina Navratilova	7^{8}	6

=== Earlier rounds ===
==== Section 1 ====
First round
(United States) Forood	6	1	6
(Peru) Arraya	4	6	3
(United States) Steinmetz	6	1	7
(Peru) Vásquez	1	6	5
(United States) Klitch	6	6
(Switzerland) Strachoňová	2	1
(South Africa) Harford	6	7
(Switzerland) Villiger	3	6

Second round
1	(United States) Evert	6	6
(United States) Forood	0	0
(United States) Steinmetz	6	3	6
(United States) Teeguarden	4	6	4
(France) Simon	6	6
(United States) Klitch	3	3
(South Africa) Harford	1	3
16	(United States) Casale	6	6

Third round
1	(United States) Evert	6	6
(United States) Steinmetz	2	1
(France) Simon	3	2
16	(United States) Casale	6	6

Fourth round
1	(United States) Evert	6	6
16	(United States) Casale	2	0

==== Section 2 ====
First round
(United States) Thompson	6	6
(Brazil) Medrado	4	2
(Romania) Romanov	6	6
(United Kingdom) Hobbs	4	2
Q	(Czechoslovakia) Pazderová	6	6
(France) Amiach	3	2
(Australia) Leo	6	6
(United States) Nagelsen	4	4

Second round
10	(United States) King	6	6
(United States) Thompson	4	4
(Romania) Romanov	6	6
(West Germany) Kohde-Kilsch	3	1
(Czechoslovakia) Tomanová	2	1
Q	(Czechoslovakia) Pazderová	6	6
(Australia) Leo	3	1
8	(United States) Smith	6	6

Third round
10	(United States) King	3	4
(Romania) Romanov	6	6
Q	(Czechoslovakia) Pazderová	1	2
8	(United States) Smith	6	6

Fourth round
(Romania) Romanov	6
8	(United States) Smith	5

==== Section 3 ====
First round
(United States) Russell	6	6
(Switzerland) Pasquale	3	2
(United States) Collins	3	7	8
Q	(France) Paradis	6	6	6
(France) Tanvier	6	6
(United Kingdom) Jevans	2	2
(United Kingdom) Durie	1	6	6
(United Kingdom) Coles	6	4	3

Second round
4	(United States) Jaeger	6	6
(United States) Russell	0	2
(United States) Collins	6	6
(United States) Walsh	3	4
(Czechoslovakia) Suková	0	3
(France) Tanvier	6	6
(United Kingdom) Durie	6	3	5
LL	(United States) Gilbert	3	6	7

Third round
4	(United States) Jaeger	6	6
(United States) Collins	0	1
(France) Tanvier	3	6
LL	(United States) Gilbert	6	7

Fourth round
4	(United States) Jaeger	6	6
LL	(United States) Gilbert	1	1

==== Section 4 ====
First round
(Switzerland) Delhees	7	6
Q	(United Kingdom) Jones	6	3
Q	(West Germany) Dries	1	6	6
(South Africa) Fairbank	6	4	2
(United States) Margolin	6	4	6
(Australia) Minter	4	6	2
(Argentina) Madruga-Osses	6	6
(United States) Blount	0	4

Second round
11	(Romania) Ruzici	7	6
(Switzerland) Delhees	6	1
Q	(West Germany) Dries	3	1
(United States) Smith	6	6
(West Germany) Riedel-Kühn	6	1	7
(United States) Margolin	2	6	9
(Argentina) Madruga-Osses	6	1	6
6	(West Germany) Hanika	4	6	4

Third round
11	(Romania) Ruzici	6	6
(United States) Smith	4	2
(United States) Margolin	1	2
(Argentina) Madruga-Osses	6	6

Fourth round
11	(Romania) Ruzici	6	6
(Argentina) Madruga-Osses	4	2

==== Section 5 ====
First round
(Netherlands) Stöve	6	6
(Hungary) Pinterová	1	4
(United States) Mascarin	6	3
(South Africa) Rollinson	2	2	r
(United States) Allen	7	6
(France) Lovera	5	2
(France) Thibault	4	6	6
(United States) DuPont	6	3	3

Second round
5	(Czechoslovakia) Mandlíková	6	6
(Netherlands) Stöve	3	4
(United States) Mascarin	3	3
(United Kingdom) Wade	6	6
(United States) White	6	7
(United States) Allen	2	5
(France) Thibault	2	4
12	(United States) Leand	6	6

Third round
5	(Czechoslovakia) Mandlíková	6	6
(United Kingdom) Wade	2	1
(United States) White	6	1
12	(United States) Leand	7	6

Fourth round
5	(Czechoslovakia) Mandlíková	6	6
12	(United States) Leand	3	1

==== Section 6 ====
First round
(Netherlands) Mesker	6	6
(United States) Jordan	3	2
(South Africa) Vermaak	6	1	6
(United States) Lewis	3	6	3
(Hungary) Temesvári	6	6
LL	(United States) Torres	4	2
(West Germany) Pfaff	6	6
(Netherlands) Vessies	3	0

Second round
14	(United States) Piatek	6	1
(Netherlands) Mesker	7	6
(South Africa) Vermaak	6	6
(Netherlands) Van der Torre	4	4
(South Korea) Lee	0	1
(Hungary) Temesvári	6	6
(West Germany) Pfaff	2	4
3	(United States) Austin	6	6

Third round
(Netherlands) Mesker	1	r
(South Africa) Vermaak	5
(Hungary) Temesvári	5	0
3	(United States) Austin	7	6

Fourth round
(South Africa) Vermaak	2	0
3	(United States) Austin	6	6

==== Section 7 ====
First round
(Brazil) Monteiro	6	5	6
Q	(Belgium) Gabriel	2	7	4
(United States) Gadusek	6	6
(Sweden) Sandin	2	2
(Czechoslovakia) Budařová	3	6	6
(United States) Sands	6	1	3
(United States) Garrison	6	6
(United States) Hallquist	1	1

Second round
7	(Socialist Federal Republic of Yugoslavia) Jaušovec	6	6
(Brazil) Monteiro	3	2
(United States) Gadusek	6	6
(Czechoslovakia) Skuherská	4	3
Q	(United States) Herr	7	6
(Czechoslovakia) Budařová	5	4
(United States) Garrison	1	7	6
9	(West Germany) Bunge	6	6	4

Third round
7	(Socialist Federal Republic of Yugoslavia) Jaušovec
(United States) Gadusek	w/o
Q	(United States) Herr	0	4
(United States) Garrison	6	6

Fourth round
7	(Socialist Federal Republic of Yugoslavia) Jaušovec	5	1
(United States) Garrison	7	6

==== Section 8 ====
First round
(United States) Harrington	2	6	6
(Italy) Simmonds	6	2	3
(United States) Horvath	6	6
(Italy) Rossi	1	1
(United States) Bonder	7	6
Q	(United States) Neviaser	5	0
(United States) Reynolds	6	3	6
(United States) Latham	3	6	3

Second round
15	(United States) Rinaldi	6	6
(United States) Harrington	2	4
(United States) Horvath	6	6
(France) Vanier	3	3
Q	(Bulgaria) Maleeva	5	1
(United States) Bonder	7	6
(United States) Reynolds	1	1
2	(United States) Navratilova	6	6

Third round
15	(United States) Rinaldi	4	6	6
(United States) Horvath	6	2	2
(United States) Bonder	1	3
2	(United States) Navratilova	6	6

Fourth round
15	(United States) Rinaldi	0	6	0
2	(United States) Navratilova	6	2	6

Preceded by 1981 Australian Open – Women's singles	Grand Slam women's singles	Succeeded by 1982 Wimbledon Championships – Women's singles
