= 1983 Avon Cup =

- Date: January 22–30
- Edition: 1st
- Draw: 56S / 32D
- Prize money: $100,000
- Surface: Clay / outdoors
- Location: Marco Island, Florida, United States

Champions

Singles
- (United States) Andrea Jaeger

Doubles
- (United States) Andrea Jaeger / (United States) Mary Lou Piatek
Avon Cup	· 1984 →

The 1983 Avon Cup was a women's tennis tournament played on outdoor clay courts in Marco Island, Florida in the United States that was part of the 1983 Virginia Slims World Championship Series. It was the inaugural edition of the tournament and was held from January 22 through January 30, 1983. First-seeded Andrea Jaeger won the singles title.

== Finals ==
=== Singles ===
(United States) Andrea Jaeger defeated (Czechoslovakia) Hana Mandlíková 6–1, 6–3

- It was Jaeger's only singles title of the year and the 10th and last of her career.

=== Doubles ===
(United States) Andrea Jaeger / (United States) Mary Lou Piatek defeated (United States) Rosemary Casals / (Australia) Wendy Turnbull 6–3, 6–3

- It was Jaeger's 2nd title of the year and the 11th of her career. It was Piatek's only title of the year and the 1st of her career.
