= 1982 French Open – Men's doubles =

Men's doubles
- 1982 French Open

Final
- Champion: (United States) Sherwood Stewart (United States) Ferdi Taygan
- Runner-up: (Chile) Hans Gildemeister (Chile) Belus Prajoux
- Score: 7–5, 6–3, 1–1, retired

Details
- Draw: 64
- Seeds: 16

Events
Singles	men	women		boys	girls
Doubles	men	women	mixed	boys	girls
WC Singles	men	women	quad
WC Doubles	men	women	quad
Legends	−45	45+	women
← 1981 ·	French Open	· 1983 →

The men's doubles tournament at the 1982 French Open was held from 24 May until 6 June 1982 on the outdoor clay courts at the Stade Roland Garros in Paris, France. Sherwood Stewart and Ferdi Taygan won the title, defeating Hans Gildemeister and Belus Prajoux in the final.

== Seeds ==
1. (United States) Sherwood Stewart / (United States) Ferdi Taygan (champions)
2. (South Africa) Kevin Curren / (United States) Steve Denton (first round)
3. (Switzerland) Heinz Günthardt / (Hungary) Balázs Taróczy (semifinals)
4. (Czechoslovakia) Pavel Složil / (Czechoslovakia) Tomáš Šmíd (first round)
5. (Sweden) Anders Järryd / (Sweden) Hans Simonsson (first round)
6. (Australia) Mark Edmondson / (United States) Bruce Manson (quarterfinals)
7. (Chile) Hans Gildemeister / (Chile) Belus Prajoux (final)
8. (United States) Terry Moor / (United States) Eliot Teltscher (third round)
9. (Brazil) Carlos Kirmayr / (France) Henri Leconte (second round)
10. (Argentina) José Luis Clerc / (Romania) Ilie Năstase (third round)
11. (Uruguay) José Luis Damiani / (Ecuador) Ricardo Ycaza (third round)
12. (United States) Tracy Delatte / (United States) Mel Purcell (second round)
13. (Australia) David Carter / (New Zealand) Chris Lewis (quarterfinals)
14. (United States) Marty Davis / (United States) Tim Mayotte (third round)
15. (United States) Brian Gottfried / (United Kingdom) John Lloyd (first round)
16. (United Kingdom) John Feaver / (Brazil) Cássio Motta (semifinals)

== Draw ==
=== Key ===
- Q = Qualifier
- WC = Wild card
- LL = Lucky loser
- Alt = Alternate
- ITF = ITF entry
- PR = Protected ranking
- SR = Special ranking
- SE = Special exempt
- JE = Junior exempt
- JR = Junior Accelerator Programme entrant
- CO = College Accelerator Programme entrant
- NG = Next Gen Accelerator Program entrant
- w/o = Walkover
- r = Retired
- d = Defaulted

=== Finals ===
Quarterfinals
1	(United States) Sherwood Stewart (United States) Ferdi Taygan	6	6
(Australia) Brad Guan (South Africa) Derek Tarr	2	4
13	(Australia) David Carter (New Zealand) Chris Lewis	4	6	4
16	(United Kingdom) John Feaver (Brazil) Cássio Motta	6	2	6
6	(Australia) Mark Edmondson (United States) Bruce Manson	3	4
3	(Switzerland) Heinz Günthardt (Hungary) Balázs Taróczy	6	6
7	(Chile) Hans Gildemeister (Chile) Belus Prajoux	7	6
(South Africa) Eddie Edwards (Finland) Leo Palin	6	4

Semifinals
1	(United States) Sherwood Stewart (United States) Ferdi Taygan	4	6	6	6
16	(United Kingdom) John Feaver (Brazil) Cássio Motta	6	4	3	2
3	(Switzerland) Heinz Günthardt (Hungary) Balázs Taróczy	6	2	6	4	6
7	(Chile) Hans Gildemeister (Chile) Belus Prajoux	4	6	3	6	8

Final
1	(United States) Sherwood Stewart (United States) Ferdi Taygan	7	6	1
7	(Chile) Hans Gildemeister (Chile) Belus Prajoux	5	3	1^{r}

=== Top half ===
==== Section 1 ====
First round
1	(United States) S Stewart (United States) F Taygan	6	6
(Hungary) Z Kuharszky (Italy) C Panatta	4	4
(South Africa) F Sauer (South Africa) S van der Merwe	3	7	6
(Chile) I Camus (Spain) G Urpí	6	6	4
(Israel) S Glickstein (United States) S Krulevitz	6	6
(Brazil) J Góes (Uruguay) D Pérez	3	4
(Brazil) N Keller (Uruguay) H Roverano	2	3
12	(United States) T Delatte (United States) M Purcell	6	6
9	(Brazil) C Kirmayr (France) H Leconte	6	6
(Argentina) R Carruthers (Argentina) C Landó	3	2
(South Africa) T Viljoen (South Africa) D Visser	6	6
(France) D Bedel (France) J-L Haillet	2	3
(Australia) B Guan (South Africa) D Tarr	6	4	6
(United States) S Meister (United States) C Wittus	4	6	4
(Italy) L Bottazzi (Ecuador) R Viver	6	3	7
5	(Sweden) A Järryd (Sweden) H Simonsson	2	6	5

Second round
1	(United States) S Stewart (United States) F Taygan	1	6	6
(South Africa) F Sauer (South Africa) S van der Merwe	6	1	4
(Israel) S Glickstein (United States) S Krulevitz	6	6
12	(United States) T Delatte (United States) M Purcell	4	4
9	(Brazil) C Kirmayr (France) H Leconte	6	6	6
(South Africa) T Viljoen (South Africa) D Visser	7	3	3
(Australia) B Guan (South Africa) D Tarr	6	6
(Italy) L Bottazzi (Ecuador) R Viver	1	1

Third round
1	(United States) S Stewart (United States) F Taygan	6	6	6
(Israel) S Glickstein (United States) S Krulevitz	3	7	3
(South Africa) T Viljoen (South Africa) D Visser	4	6	4
(Australia) B Guan (South Africa) D Tarr	6	3	6

Quarterfinals
1	(United States) S Stewart (United States) F Taygan	6	6
(Australia) B Guan (South Africa) D Tarr	2	4

==== Section 2 ====
First round
4	(Czechoslovakia) P Složil (Czechoslovakia) T Šmíd	3	6	3
(Poland) W Fibak (Australia) J Fitzgerald	6	1	6
(New Zealand) B Derlin (West Germany) D Keretić	6	5	3
(Australia) J Alexander (Australia) P Cash	4	7	6
(Brazil) M Hocevar (Brazil) J Soares	7	2	8
(Australia) B Dyke (Australia) P Johnston	5	6	6
(Sweden) J Gunnarsson (Sweden) P Hjertquist	3	1
13	(Australia) D Carter (New Zealand) C Lewis	6	6
16	(United Kingdom) J Feaver (Brazil) C Motta	7	6
(South Africa) R Chappell (United States) G Hardie	6	4
(Switzerland) I Dupasquier (France) C Roger-Vasselin	3	2
(Paraguay) F González (South Africa) R Moore	6	6
(Australia) W Hampson (Belgium) T Stevaux	6	4
(Switzerland) M Günthardt (Philippines) B Sison	7	6
(Argentina) E Bengoechea (Romania) F Segărceanu	3	1
8	(United States) T Moor (United States) E Teltscher	6	6

Second round
(Poland) W Fibak (Australia) J Fitzgerald	6	3
(Australia) J Alexander (Australia) P Cash	7	6
(Brazil) M Hocevar (Brazil) J Soares	3	2
13	(Australia) D Carter (New Zealand) C Lewis	6	6
16	(United Kingdom) J Feaver (Brazil) C Motta	6	6
(Paraguay) F González (South Africa) R Moore	4	4
(Switzerland) M Günthardt (Philippines) B Sison	5	7	3
8	(United States) T Moor (United States) E Teltscher	7	5	6

Third round
(Australia) J Alexander (Australia) P Cash	6	2	1
13	(Australia) D Carter (New Zealand) C Lewis	3	6	6
16	(United Kingdom) J Feaver (Brazil) C Motta	6	3	6
8	(United States) T Moor (United States) E Teltscher	2	6	3

Quarterfinals
13	(Australia) D Carter (New Zealand) C Lewis	4	6	4
16	(United Kingdom) J Feaver (Brazil) C Motta	6	2	6

=== Bottom half ===
==== Section 3 ====
First round
6	(Australia) M Edmondson (United States) B Manson	6	7
(Spain) S Casal (Chile) A Pierola	3	6
(France) J Potier (France) T Tulasne	6	6
(Argentina) A Ganzábal (Argentina) G Guerrero	4	2
(Belgium) A Brichant (Belgium) J Vanlangendonck	3	2
(Zimbabwe) H Ismail (United States) M Vines	6	6
(Argentina) G Aubone (Argentina) A Gattiker	3	2
10	(Argentina) JL Clerc (Romania) I Năstase	6	6
14	(United States) M Davis (United States) T Mayotte	7	5	6
(United States) M Brunnberg (United States) R Meyer	6	7	1
(United States) L Bourne (United States) C Hooper	1	6	8
(United States) D Ralston (France) J Vanier	6	3	6
(Colombia) I Molina (Argentina) G Tiberti	6	6	7
(United States) M Freedman (Mexico) J Hernández	3	7	5
(Republic of Ireland) M Doyle (Republic of Ireland) S Sorensen	5	2
3	(Switzerland) H Günthardt (Hungary) B Taróczy	7	6

Second round
6	(Australia) M Edmondson (United States) B Manson	6	6
(France) J Potier (France) T Tulasne	1	4
(Zimbabwe) H Ismail (United States) M Vines	7	2	4
10	(Argentina) JL Clerc (Romania) I Năstase	6	6	6
14	(United States) M Davis (United States) T Mayotte	7	6
(United States) L Bourne (United States) C Hooper	6	2
(Colombia) I Molina (Argentina) G Tiberti	5	5
3	(Switzerland) H Günthardt (Hungary) B Taróczy	7	7

Third round
6	(Australia) M Edmondson (United States) B Manson	6	6	6
10	(Argentina) JL Clerc (Romania) I Năstase	4	7	4
14	(United States) M Davis (United States) T Mayotte	5	2
3	(Switzerland) H Günthardt (Hungary) B Taróczy	7	6

Quarterfinals
6	(Australia) M Edmondson (United States) B Manson	3	4
3	(Switzerland) H Günthardt (Hungary) B Taróczy	6	6

==== Section 4 ====
First round
7	(Chile) H Gildemeister (Chile) B Prajoux	6	6
(Italy) P Bertolucci (Italy) A Panatta	1	3
(West Germany) A Maurer (West Germany) W Popp	6	5	9
(Socialist Federal Republic of Yugoslavia) Ž Franulović (Socialist Federal Republic of Yugoslavia) M Ostoja	3	7	7
(Bolivia) R Benavides (Peru) B Maze	0	7	5
(France) G Moretton (France) P Portes	6	6	7
(United States) C Strode (United States) M Strode	6	6	3
11	(Uruguay) JL Damiani (Ecuador) R Ycaza	7	2	6
15	(United States) B Gottfried (United Kingdom) J Lloyd	6	4
(Sweden) S Simonsson (Sweden) H Sundström	7	6
(Czechoslovakia) S Birner (Czechoslovakia) J Granát	6	6
(United States) R Evett (United States) E Iskersky	2	4
(Belgium) B Boileau (Mexico) A González	7	6
(France) T Benhabiles (France) G Forget	6	3
(South Africa) E Edwards (Finland) L Palin	6	7
2	(South Africa) K Curren (United States) S Denton	2	6

Second round
7	(Chile) H Gildemeister (Chile) B Prajoux	6	1	6
(West Germany) A Maurer (West Germany) W Popp	4	6	3
(France) G Moretton (France) P Portes	5	7	3
11	(Uruguay) JL Damiani (Ecuador) R Ycaza	7	6	6
(Sweden) S Simonsson (Sweden) H Sundström	6	7	3
(Czechoslovakia) S Birner (Czechoslovakia) J Granát	7	5	6
(Belgium) B Boileau (Mexico) A González	6	4	10
(South Africa) E Edwards (Finland) L Palin	4	6	12

Third round
7	(Chile) H Gildemeister (Chile) B Prajoux	6	6
11	(Uruguay) JL Damiani (Ecuador) R Ycaza	2	3
(Czechoslovakia) S Birner (Czechoslovakia) J Granát	4	5
(South Africa) E Edwards (Finland) L Palin	6	7

Quarterfinals
7	(Chile) H Gildemeister (Chile) B Prajoux	7	6
(South Africa) E Edwards (Finland) L Palin	6	4
