= 1982 French Open – Women's doubles =

Women's doubles
- 1982 French Open

Final
- Champion: (United States) Martina Navratilova (United States) Anne Smith
- Runner-up: (United States) Rosemary Casals (Australia) Wendy Turnbull
- Score: 6–3, 6–4

Details
- Draw: 48
- Seeds: 8

Events
Singles	men	women		boys	girls
Doubles	men	women	mixed	boys	girls
WC Singles	men	women	quad
WC Doubles	men	women	quad
Legends	−45	45+	women
← 1981 ·	French Open	· 1983 →

Rosalyn Fairbank and Tanya Harford were the defending champions, but lost in the third round to Mary-Lou Piatek and Sharon Walsh.

Martina Navratilova and Anne Smith won the title, defeating Rosemary Casals and Wendy Turnbull in the final 6–3, 6–4.

== Seeds ==
1. (United States) Rosemary Casals / (Australia) Wendy Turnbull (final)
2. (United States) Martina Navratilova / (United States) Anne Smith (champions)
3. (United States) Candy Reynolds / (United States) Paula Smith (quarterfinals)
4. (United States) JoAnne Russell / (Romania) Virginia Ruzici (second round)
5. (South Africa) Rosalyn Fairbank / (South Africa) Tanya Harford (third round)
6. (United States) Leslie Allen / (Socialist Federal Republic of Yugoslavia) Mima Jaušovec (second round)
7. (West Germany) Bettina Bunge / (West Germany) Claudia Kohde-Kilsch (quarterfinals)
8. (United Kingdom) Jo Durie / (United Kingdom) Anne Hobbs (third round)

== Draw ==
=== Key ===
- Q = Qualifier
- WC = Wild card
- LL = Lucky loser
- Alt = Alternate
- SE = Special exempt
- PR = Protected ranking
- ITF = ITF entry
- JE = Junior exempt
- w/o = Walkover
- r = Retired
- d = Defaulted
- SR = Special ranking

=== Finals ===
Quarterfinals
1	(United States) Rosemary Casals (Australia) Wendy Turnbull	4	7	6
(United States) Andrea Jaeger (United States) Betsy Nagelsen	6	5	4
(Argentina) Ivanna Madruga-Osses (France) Catherine Tanvier	6	4
(United States) Mary-Lou Piatek (United States) Sharon Walsh	7	6
(United States) Kathy Horvath (South Africa) Yvonne Vermaak	6	6
3	(United States) Candy Reynolds (United States) Paula Smith	2	4
7	(West Germany) Bettina Bunge (West Germany) Claudia Kohde-Kilsch	6	3
2	(United States) Martina Navratilova (United States) Anne Smith	7	6

Semifinals
1	(United States) Rosemary Casals (Australia) Wendy Turnbull	6	2	6
(United States) Mary-Lou Piatek (United States) Sharon Walsh	0	6	3
(United States) Kathy Horvath (South Africa) Yvonne Vermaak	6	2	2
2	(United States) Martina Navratilova (United States) Anne Smith	2	6	6

Final
1	(United States) Rosemary Casals (Australia) Wendy Turnbull	3	4
2	(United States) Martina Navratilova (United States) Anne Smith	6	6

=== Top half ===
==== Section 1 ====
First round
(Australia) N Gregory (Australia) A Minter	4	3
(United States) A Leand (Hungary) A Temesvári	6	6
(United States) N Neviaser (United States) K Steinmetz	6	6
(United States) K Sands (Italy) S Simmonds	4	4
(United States) T Lewis (United States) S Margolin	2	1
(United States) P Casale (United States) L-A Thompson	6	6
(Hungary) M Pinterová (Japan) N Sato	6	6	2
(Brazil) P Medrado (Brazil) C Monteiro	4	7	6

Second round
1	(United States) R Casals (Australia) W Turnbull	3	6	6
(United States) A Leand (Hungary) A Temesvári	6	2	3
(United States) N Neviaser (United States) K Steinmetz	2	5
(New Zealand) C Newton (Australia) B Remilton	6	7
8	(United Kingdom) J Durie (United Kingdom) A Hobbs	6	6
(United States) P Casale (United States) L-A Thompson	3	2
(Brazil) P Medrado (Brazil) C Monteiro	4	4
(United States) A Jaeger (United States) B Nagelsen	6	6

Third round
1	(United States) R Casals (Australia) W Turnbull	6	6
(New Zealand) C Newton (Australia) B Remilton	2	2
8	(United Kingdom) J Durie (United Kingdom) A Hobbs	4	6	4
(United States) A Jaeger (United States) B Nagelsen	6	3	6

Quarterfinals
1	(United States) R Casals (Australia) W Turnbull	4	7	6
(United States) A Jaeger (United States) B Nagelsen	6	5	4

==== Section 2 ====
First round
(United States) R Blount (Argentina) R Giscafré	6	4	3
(Argentina) I Madruga-Osses (France) C Tanvier	2	6	6
(United Kingdom) G Coles (United States) L duPont	5	3
(Australia) E Sayers (Australia) A Tobin	7	6
(South Africa) E Gordon (South Africa) B Mould	5	6	2
(Czechoslovakia) I Budařová (Czechoslovakia) M Skuherská	7	2	6
(United States) B Jordan (Australia) S Leo	5	1
(United States) J Mundel (South Africa) S Rollinson	7	6

Second round
4	(United States) J Russell (Romania) V Ruzici	4	6	5
(Argentina) I Madruga-Osses (France) C Tanvier	6	2	7
(Australia) E Sayers (Australia) A Tobin	6	6
(United States) L Bonder (United States) Z Garrison	2	3
5	(South Africa) R Fairbank (South Africa) T Harford	2	6	6
(Czechoslovakia) I Budařová (Czechoslovakia) M Skuherská	6	2	3
(United States) J Mundel (South Africa) S Rollinson	6	3	1
(United States) M-L Piatek (United States) S Walsh	3	6	6

Third round
(Argentina) I Madruga-Osses (France) C Tanvier	7	7
(Australia) E Sayers (Australia) A Tobin	6	5
5	(South Africa) R Fairbank (South Africa) T Harford	5	4
(United States) M-L Piatek (United States) S Walsh	7	6

Quarterfinals
(Argentina) I Madruga-Osses (France) C Tanvier	6	4
(United States) M-L Piatek (United States) S Walsh	7	6

=== Bottom half ===
==== Section 3 ====
First round
(France) S Amiach (France) C Vanier	6	6
(United States) L Forood (Sweden) M Wikstedt	4	2
(West Germany) E Pfaff (Czechoslovakia) R Tomanová	6	6
(United States) J Harrington (United States) K Latham	2	2
(United States) M Carillo (United States) R Gerulaitis	1	1
(United States) S Mascarin (United States) A White	6	6
(United Kingdom) D Jevans (Switzerland) I Villiger	2	0^{r}
(United States) A Henricksson (Australia) P Whytcross	6	1

Second round
(United States) K Horvath (South Africa) Y Vermaak	6	6	6
(France) S Amiach (France) C Vanier	3	7	4
(West Germany) E Pfaff (Czechoslovakia) R Tomanová	6	6
6	(United States) L Allen (Socialist Federal Republic of Yugoslavia) M Jaušovec	2	4
(United States) B Hallquist (United States) S McInerney	1	1
(United States) S Mascarin (United States) A White	6	6
(United States) A Henricksson (Australia) P Whytcross	1	3
3	(United States) C Reynolds (United States) P Smith	6	6

Third round
(United States) K Horvath (South Africa) Y Vermaak	6	6
(West Germany) E Pfaff (Czechoslovakia) R Tomanová	2	2
(United States) S Mascarin (United States) A White	3	6	3
3	(United States) C Reynolds (United States) P Smith	6	4	6

Quarterfinals
(United States) K Horvath (South Africa) Y Vermaak	6	6
3	(United States) C Reynolds (United States) P Smith	2	4

==== Section 4 ====
First round
(Netherlands) B Stöve (United States) P Teeguarden	6	6	6
(South Korea) D-h Lee (Peru) P Vásquez	7	3	1
(Romania) L Romanov (Romania) M Romanov	6	6
(Switzerland) P Delhees (Netherlands) M Mesker	4	4
(United States) B Bramblett (United States) B Herr	0	1
(Czechoslovakia) H Mandlíková (Czechoslovakia) H Suková	6	6
(United States) S Collins (United States) B Lemberg	3	7	4
(Peru) L Arraya (Czechoslovakia) H Strachoňová	6	5	6

Second round
(France) G Lovera-Benedetti (France) P Paradis	2	6	2
(Netherlands) B Stöve (United States) P Teeguarden	6	4	6
(Romania) L Romanov (Romania) M Romanov	0	0
7	(West Germany) B Bunge (West Germany) C Kohde-Kilsch	6	6
(United States) B Gadusek (United Kingdom) V Wade	6	4	8
(Czechoslovakia) H Mandlíková (Czechoslovakia) H Suková	4	6	10
(Peru) L Arraya (Czechoslovakia) H Strachoňová	3	4
2	(United States) M Navratilova (United States) A Smith	6	6

Third round
(Netherlands) B Stöve (United States) P Teeguarden	4	2
7	(West Germany) B Bunge (West Germany) C Kohde-Kilsch	6	6
(Czechoslovakia) H Mandlíková (Czechoslovakia) H Suková	4	6	3
2	(United States) M Navratilova (United States) A Smith	6	3	6

Quarterfinals
7	(West Germany) B Bunge (West Germany) C Kohde-Kilsch	6	3
2	(United States) M Navratilova (United States) A Smith	7	6
