= 1982 French Open – Men's singles =

Men's singles
- 1982 French Open

Final
- Champion: (Sweden) Mats Wilander
- Runner-up: (Argentina) Guillermo Vilas
- Score: 1–6, 7–6^{(8–6)}, 6–0, 6–4

Details
- Draw: 128
- Seeds: 16

Events
Singles	men	women		boys	girls
Doubles	men	women	mixed	boys	girls
WC Singles	men	women	quad
WC Doubles	men	women	quad
Legends	−45	45+	women
- French Open

Mats Wilander defeated Guillermo Vilas in the final, 1–6, 7–6^{(8–6)}, 6–0, 6–4 to win the men's singles tennis title at the 1982 French Open. It was his first major title and first top-level title overall. He had won the boys’ title the previous year, and was making his French Open main-draw debut. Wilander defeated four of the top-five seeded players consecutively to win the title (second seed Ivan Lendl, fifth seed Vitas Gerulaitis, fourth seed José Luis Clerc, and third seed Vilas). Wilander became the youngest major champion in the Open Era at 17 years, 288 days old, breaking the record Björn Borg set at the age of 18 years, 10 days when he won the 1974 French Open.

Borg was the four-time reigning champion, but chose not to participate after the Men's Tennis Council ruled he had not played enough tournaments and would have to qualify. World No. 1 John McEnroe withdrew with an ankle injury.

== Seeds ==
The seeded players are listed below. Mats Wilander is the champion; others show the round in which they were eliminated.

1. (United States) Jimmy Connors (quarterfinals)
2. (Czechoslovakia) Ivan Lendl (fourth round)
3. (Argentina) Guillermo Vilas (final)
4. (Argentina) José Luis Clerc (semifinals)
5. (United States) Vitas Gerulaitis (quarterfinals)
6. (United States) Eliot Teltscher (fourth round)
7. (Australia) Peter McNamara (quarterfinals)
8. (France) Yannick Noah (quarterfinals)
9. (Ecuador) Andrés Gómez (fourth round)
10. (Hungary) Balázs Taróczy (second round)
11. (United States) Brian Gottfried (second round)
12. n/a
13. (Spain) José Higueras (semifinals)
14. (United States) Steve Denton (first round)
15. (United States) Chip Hooper (fourth round)
16. (United States) Mel Purcell (fourth round)

== Draw ==
Key

- Q = Qualifier
- WC = Wild card
- LL = Lucky loser
- Alt = Alternate
- ITF = ITF entry
- PR = Protected ranking
- SR = Special ranking
- SE = Special exempt
- JE = Junior exempt
- JR = Junior Accelerator Programme entrant
- CO = College Accelerator Programme entrant
- NG = Next Gen Accelerator Program entrant
- w/o = Walkover
- r = Retired
- d = Defaulted

=== Finals ===
Quarterfinals
1	(United States) Jimmy Connors	2	2	2
13	(Spain) José Higueras	6	6	6
3	(Argentina) Guillermo Vilas	7	6	6
8	(France) Yannick Noah	6	3	4
7	(Australia) Peter McNamara	2	2	1
4	(Argentina) José Luis Clerc	6	6	6
5	(United States) Vitas Gerulaitis	3	3	6	4
(Sweden) Mats Wilander	6	6	4	6

Semifinals
13	(Spain) José Higueras	1	3	6
3	(Argentina) Guillermo Vilas	6	6	7
4	(Argentina) José Luis Clerc	5	2	6	5
(Sweden) Mats Wilander	7	6	1	7

Final
3	(Argentina) Guillermo Vilas	6	6^{6}	0	4
(Sweden) Mats Wilander	1	7^{8}	6	6

=== Top half ===
==== Section 1 ====
First round
1	(United States) J Connors	6	6	6
(United States) B Manson	3	3	1
(Sweden) J Gunnarsson	4	6	1	6	6
(Zimbabwe) H Ismail	6	3	6	2	0
Q	(Socialist Federal Republic of Yugoslavia) S Živojinović	6	2	2
(France) G Forget	7	6	6
(Romania) I Năstase	6	6	6
(Hungary) Z Kuharszky	3	2	2
(West Germany) U Pinner	1	6	6	6	6
(United States) T Mayotte	6	2	3	7	4
(Israel) S Glickstein	2	4	6
(United States) J Arias	6	6	7
(Uruguay) D Pérez	6	6	6
(Australia) J Fitzgerald	0	3	0
(Australia) D Carter	3	4	6	2
15	(United States) C Hooper	6	6	2	6

Second round
1	(United States) J Connors	6	6	6
(Sweden) J Gunnarsson	2	0	2
(France) G Forget	6	5	6	1	9
(Romania) I Năstase	1	7	4	6	7
(West Germany) U Pinner	3	3	6
(United States) J Arias	6	6	7
(Uruguay) D Pérez	6	1	3
15	(United States) C Hooper	7	6	6

Third round
1	(United States) J Connors	6	6	6	6
(France) G Forget	2	3	7	1
(United States) J Arias	3	4	7	6
15	(United States) C Hooper	6	6	6	7

Fourth round
1	(United States) J Connors	6	6	6
15	(United States) C Hooper	1	0	4

==== Section 2 ====
First round
13	(Spain) J Higueras	3	6	6	6
(Spain) S Casal	6	3	0	4
(Czechoslovakia) J Granát	4	6	5	6	6
(United States) M Vines	6	4	7	3	1
(West Germany) D Keretić	3	6	6	6
(Chile) H Gildemeister	6	3	4	4
Q	(United States) C Strode	7	5	1	3
(Argentina) G Tiberti	6	7	6	6
(France) J-F Caujolle	6	4	2	6	6
(United States) S Krulevitz	4	6	6	1	3
(West Germany) P Elter	6	6	6
(France) P Torre	2	2	2
(United States) M Doyle	3	6	6	5
(Paraguay) V Pecci, Sr.	6	3	7	7
(United States) N Saviano	4	4	3
6	(United States) E Teltscher	6	6	6

Second round
13	(Spain) J Higueras	7	4	6
(Czechoslovakia) J Granát	5	6	1	r
(West Germany) D Keretić	6	7	6	2	6
(Argentina) G Tiberti	2	6	7	6	2
(France) J-F Caujolle	6	6	6	0
(West Germany) P Elter	3	7	7	6
(Paraguay) V Pecci, Sr.	w/o
6	(United States) E Teltscher

Third round
13	(Spain) J Higueras	3	3	7	6	6
(West Germany) D Keretić	6	6	6	3	2
(West Germany) P Elter	4	6	1	3
6	(United States) E Teltscher	6	2	6	6

Fourth round
13	(Spain) J Higueras	6	6	6
6	(United States) E Teltscher	4	2	0

==== Section 3 ====
First round
3	(Argentina) G Vilas	6	6	6
(France) C Freyss	2	2	1
(Colombia) J Velasco, Sr.	4	6	6	6
Q	(France) T Benhabiles	6	1	1	3
(United States) L Bourne	6	7	6
(Spain) J García	4	5	2
(Australia) B Guan	3	3	7	3
(Spain) J Avendaño	6	6	6	6
(Sweden) T Högstedt	7	6	6
(Australia) J Alexander	6	4	4
(West Germany) A Maurer	6	7	6
Q	(Argentina) E Bengoechea	2	6	4
(Chile) A Pierola	4	2	2
(Czechoslovakia) P Složil	6	6	6
Q	(Sweden) H Simonsson	6	2	7	1	4
10	(Hungary) B Taróczy	4	6	6	6	6

Second round
3	(Argentina) G Vilas	6	6	6
(Colombia) J Velasco, Sr.	1	2	1
(United States) L Bourne	1	0	5
(Spain) J Avendaño	6	6	7
(Sweden) T Högstedt	1	1	2
(West Germany) A Maurer	6	6	6
(Czechoslovakia) P Složil	3	7	7	6	6
10	(Hungary) B Taróczy	6	6	5	7	3

Third round
3	(Argentina) G Vilas	6	6	6
(Spain) J Avendaño	0	1	0
(West Germany) A Maurer	6	3	7	7
(Czechoslovakia) P Složil	1	6	5	6

Fourth round
3	(Argentina) G Vilas	6	6	6
(West Germany) A Maurer	2	3	1

==== Section 4 ====
First round
Q	(Argentina) A Gattiker	3	3	2
(South Africa) M Myburg	6	6	6
(Brazil) J Góes	2	3	1
(Argentina) A Ganzábal	6	6	6
(Italy) A Panatta	3	7	6	7
(France) P Portes	6	6	4	5
(West Germany) R Gehring	2	2	2
(Poland) W Fibak	6	6	6
(Bolivia) M Martinez	5	4	0
(West Germany) K Eberhard	7	6	6
Q	(United States) C Wittus	2	1	3
Q	(United Kingdom) J Lloyd	6	6	6
(United States) T Moor	7	7	6
(United States) V Winitsky	5	6	4
Q	(France) J-L Haillet	2	3	2
8	(France) Y Noah	6	6	6

Second round
(South Africa) M Myburg	6	2	4	6	6
(Argentina) A Ganzábal	4	6	6	2	4
(Italy) A Panatta	4	1	3
(Poland) W Fibak	6	6	6
(West Germany) K Eberhard	6	3	6	6	3
Q	(United Kingdom) J Lloyd	2	6	7	4	6
(United States) T Moor	0	3	3
8	(France) Y Noah	6	6	6

Third round
(South Africa) M Myburg	0	2	5
(Poland) W Fibak	6	6	7
Q	(United Kingdom) J Lloyd	5	0	3
8	(France) Y Noah	7	6	6

Fourth round
(Poland) W Fibak	6	7	4	4	3
8	(France) Y Noah	4	6	6	6	6

=== Bottom half ===
==== Section 5 ====
First round
7	(Australia) P McNamara	4	6	7	7
(France) H Leconte	6	3	6	5
(Italy) P Bertolucci	4	2	1
(United States) H Solomon	6	6	6
(Czechoslovakia) T Šmid	6	6	6	6
Q	(France) P Kuchna	0	7	3	2
(Paraguay) F González	6	6	7
(Brazil) C Kirmayr	3	2	5
Q	(South Africa) D Tarr	1	4	7	4
(France) G Moretton	6	6	5	6
(Uruguay) J L Damiani	4	6	3	2
(Socialist Federal Republic of Yugoslavia) M Ostoja	6	4	6	6
(France) J Potier	4	7	6	6	5
Q	(Argentina) C Castellan	6	5	0	7	7
(Italy) C Barazzutti	4	4	7	6	3
9	(Ecuador) A Gómez	6	6	6	3	6

Second round
7	(Australia) P McNamara	2	3	7	6	6
(United States) H Solomon	6	6	6	1	3
(Czechoslovakia) T Šmid	7	6	6	6
(Paraguay) F González	6	4	7	4
(France) G Moretton	4	6	6	0	5
(Socialist Federal Republic of Yugoslavia) M Ostoja	6	2	3	6	7
Q	(Argentina) C Castellan	7	4	1	5
9	(Ecuador) A Gómez	6	6	6	7

Third round
7	(Australia) P McNamara	2	6	7	6
(Czechoslovakia) T Šmid	6	1	6	3
(Socialist Federal Republic of Yugoslavia) M Ostoja	4	3	6	4
9	(Ecuador) A Gómez	6	6	4	6

Fourth round
7	(Australia) P McNamara	6	5	6	3	11
9	(Ecuador) A Gómez	1	7	3	6	9

==== Section 6 ====
First round
14	(United States) S Denton	6	4	6	3
(South Africa) D Visser	3	6	7	6
(Sweden) J Nyström	1	7	6	6
(Italy) C Panatta	6	6	0	0
(New Zealand) C Lewis	6	6	6
(New Zealand) O Parun	3	3	3
(Spain) G Urpí	7	6	4	6
Q	(Italy) P Parrini	5	1	6	1
(France) G Goven	6	4	5	3
(Peru) P Arraya	3	6	7	6
(South Africa) F Sauer	2	2	6	6	2
(France) B Fritz	6	6	4	2	6
(France) L Courteau	6	6	2	7
(New Zealand) B Derlin	4	3	6	6
(Spain) E Osta	2	4	1
4	(Argentina) J L Clerc	6	6	6

Second round
(South Africa) D Visser	7	6	2	2
(Sweden) J Nyström	6	7	6	6
(New Zealand) C Lewis	w/o
(Spain) G Urpí
(Peru) P Arraya	6	6	5	4
(France) B Fritz	7	3	7	6
(France) L Courteau	6	6	6	6	2
4	(Argentina) J L Clerc	1	7	4	7	6

Third round
(Sweden) J Nyström	3	6	6	6
(Spain) G Urpí	6	3	3	1
(France) B Fritz	2	6	4	3
4	(Argentina) J L Clerc	6	3	6	6

Fourth round
(Sweden) J Nyström	6	6	0	2
4	(Argentina) J L Clerc	7	4	6	6

==== Section 7 ====
First round
5	(United States) V Gerulaitis	6	6	7	6
(United States) E Iskersky	7	3	6	3
(Ecuador) R Ycaza	6	4	1	5
(Belgium) B Boileau	3	6	6	7
(Brazil) M Hocevar	7	6	6	6	0
(France) C Roger-Vasselin	6	3	7	7	6
(Switzerland) H Gunthardt	4	6	6	6
(Spain) J López-Maeso	6	0	3	4
(Finland) L Palin	6	6	3	7
(United States) M Davis	3	3	6	6
(Argentina) R Cano	1	0	3
(Sweden) A Järryd	6	6	6
(France) D Bedel	4	6	3	6
(United States) J Lapidus	6	2	6	7
Q	(Argentina) G Aubone	5	2	1
16	(United States) M Purcell	7	6	6

Second round
5	(United States) V Gerulaitis	6	6	6
(Belgium) B Boileau	1	2	0
(France) C Roger-Vasselin	4	4	6
(Switzerland) H Günthardt	6	6	7
(Finland) L Palin	3	4	0
(Sweden) A Järryd	6	6	6
(United States) J Lapidus	1	2	1
16	(United States) M Purcell	6	6	6

Third round
5	(United States) V Gerulaitis	6	7	5	6
(Switzerland) H Günthardt	2	6	7	4
(Sweden) A Järryd	2	2	3
16	(United States) M Purcell	6	6	6

Fourth round
5	(United States) V Gerulaitis	6	6	6
16	(United States) M Purcell	3	3	2

==== Section 8 ====
First round
11	(United States) B Gottfried	4	6	6	6
(Spain) A Giménez	6	1	1	3
(Spain) F Luna	6	6	6	6
(France) E Deblicker	7	2	2	1
(Sweden) M Wilander	6	6	6
(Colombia) A Cortes	4	3	4
(Brazil) C Motta	6	4	6	7	6
(Czechoslovakia) S Birner	7	6	3	6	3
(India) R Krishnan	1	4	6	6	6
(Brazil) J Soares	6	6	3	2	4
Q	(United Kingdom) J Feaver	2	1	4
(Sweden) P Hjertquist	6	6	6
(France) T Tulasne	7	6	6
(Chile) P Rebolledo	6	4	1
Q	(Peru) F Maynetto	0	4	1
2	(Czechoslovakia) I Lendl	6	6	6

Second round
11	(United States) B Gottfried	7	7	3	0	4
(Spain) F Luna	5	6	6	6	6
(Sweden) M Wilander	6	6	4	6
(Brazil) C Motta	3	4	6	2
(India) R Krishnan	7	6	6
(Sweden) P Hjertquist	5	1	1
(France) T Tulasne	6	5	6
2	(Czechoslovakia) I Lendl	7	7	7

Third round
(Spain) F Luna	3	1	0
(Sweden) M Wilander	6	6	6
(India) R Krishnan	2	1	0
2	(Czechoslovakia) I Lendl	6	6	6

Fourth round
(Sweden) M Wilander	4	7	3	6	6
2	(Czechoslovakia) I Lendl	6	5	6	4	2

Preceded by 1981 Australian Open	Grand Slam men's singles	Succeeded by 1982 Wimbledon Championships
