= Río de la Plata Challenger =

Argentinian tennis tournament

Defunct tennis tournament
- Tour: ATP Challenger Series
- Founded: 1980
- Abolished: 1981
- Editions: 2
- Location: Buenos Aires; Argentina
- Surface: Clay – outdoors

The Río de la Plata Challenger was a tennis tournament held in Buenos Aires, Argentina in 1980 and 1981. The event is part of the ATP Challenger Tour and is played on outdoor clay courts.

== Past finals ==
=== Singles ===
Year	Champion	Runner-up	Score
1981	(United States) Eric Fromm	(Argentina) Fernando Dalla Fontana	6–2, 6–1

=== Doubles ===
Year	Champions	Runners-up	Score
1981	(Argentina) Roberto Carruthers (Argentina) Carlos Landó	(United States) Charles Strode (United States) Morris Strode	0-6, 6–1, 6–3
