= 1982 French Open – Mixed doubles =

Mixed doubles
- 1982 French Open

Final
- Champion: (United Kingdom) John Lloyd (Australia) Wendy Turnbull
- Runner-up: (Brazil) Cássio Motta (Brazil) Cláudia Monteiro
- Score: 6–2, 7–6^{(12–10)}

Details
- Draw: 32

Events
Singles	men	women		boys	girls
Doubles	men	women	mixed	boys	girls
WC Singles	men	women	quad
WC Doubles	men	women	quad
Legends	−45	45+	women
- French Open

The mixed doubles tournament at the 1982 French Open was held from 24 May until 6 June 1982 on the outdoor clay courts at the Stade Roland Garros in Paris, France. John Lloyd and Wendy Turnbull won the title, defeating Cássio Motta and Cláudia Monteiro in the final.

== Seeds ==
1. (United Kingdom) John Lloyd / (Australia) Wendy Turnbull (champions)
2. (United States) Jimmy Arias / (United States) Kathy Rinaldi (quarterfinals)
3. (United States) Mel Purcell / (United States) Andrea Leand (second round)
4. (United States) Sherwood Stewart / (Romania) Lucia Romanov (semifinals)
5. (United States) Bruce Manson / (United States) Pam Teeguarden (semifinals)
6. (United States) Dennis Ralston / (United States) Sharon Walsh (quarterfinals)
7. (United States) Tracy Delatte / (United States) Candy Reynolds (quarterfinals)
8. n/a

== Draw ==
Key

- Q = Qualifier
- WC = Wild card
- LL = Lucky loser
- Alt = Alternate
- ITF = ITF entry
- PR = Protected ranking
- SR = Special ranking
- SE = Special exempt
- JE = Junior exempt
- JR = Junior Accelerator Programme entrant
- CO = College Accelerator Programme entrant
- NG = Next Gen Accelerator Program entrant
- w/o = Walkover
- r = Retired
- d = Defaulted

=== Finals ===
Semifinals
1	(United Kingdom) John Lloyd (Australia) Wendy Turnbull	6	6	6
5	(United States) Bruce Manson (United States) Pam Teeguarden	7	3	1
4	(United States) Sherwood Stewart (Romania) Lucia Romanov	2	4
(Brazil) Cássio Motta (Brazil) Cláudia Monteiro	6	6

Final
1	(United Kingdom) John Lloyd (Australia) Wendy Turnbull	6	7^{12}
(Brazil) Cássio Motta (Brazil) Cláudia Monteiro	2	6^{10}

=== Top half ===
First round
1	(United Kingdom) J Lloyd (Australia) W Turnbull	6	6
(United States) C Hooper (Canada) C Bassett	3	3
(United States) C Strode (United States) L Allen	6	6
(France) F Hamonet (France) P Paradis	4	2
(Uruguay) D Pérez (France) B Simon	7	1	6
(Switzerland) Z Kuharszky (Switzerland) I Villiger	5	6	8
(Peru) P Arraya (Peru) L Arraya	4	6	4
7	(United States) T Delatte (United States) C Reynolds	6	4	6
3	(United States) M Purcell (United States) A Leand	7	6
(France) T Benhabiles (United States) K Jones	6	2
(Zimbabwe) H Ismail (United States) S Collins	7	6
(Ecuador) R Viver (Peru) P Vásquez	5	4
(France) L Courteau (United States) B Herr	0	3
(United States) M Davis (United States) B Jordan	6	6
(France) D Naegelen (France) G Lovera Benedetti	3	3
5	(United States) B Manson (United States) P Teeguarden	6	6

Second round
1	(United Kingdom) J Lloyd (Australia) W Turnbull	6	7	6
(United States) C Strode (United States) L Allen	7	5	1
(Switzerland) Z Kuharszky (Switzerland) I Villiger	6	3	4
7	(United States) T Delatte (United States) C Reynolds	3	6	6
3	(United States) M Purcell (United States) A Leand	4	3
(Zimbabwe) H Ismail (United States) S Collins	6	6
(United States) M Davis (United States) B Jordan	6	6	3
5	(United States) B Manson (United States) P Teeguarden	7	1	6

Quarterfinals
1	(United Kingdom) J Lloyd (Australia) W Turnbull	6	7
7	(United States) T Delatte (United States) C Reynolds	4	6
(Zimbabwe) H Ismail (United States) S Collins	4	2
5	(United States) B Manson (United States) P Teeguarden	6	6

Semifinals
1	(United Kingdom) J Lloyd (Australia) W Turnbull	6	6	6
5	(United States) B Manson (United States) P Teeguarden	7	3	1

=== Bottom half ===
First round
6	(United States) D Ralston (United States) S Walsh	6	3	6
(United States) G Hardie (United States) M-L Piatek	4	6	4
(Argentina) A Gattiker (Argentina) L Giussani	3	4
(France) G Forget (France) F Thibault	6	6
(Uruguay) H Roverano (France) S Amiach	6	5	3
(Australia) P Cash (United States) S Mascarin	4	7	6
(United States) M Strode (United States) P Smith	4	2
4	(United States) S Stewart (Romania) L Romanov	6	6
Alt	(Argentina) R Carruthers (Chile) G Ohaco	6	6
(France) J Vanier (France) C Vanier	4	1
(Uruguay) J-L Damiani (France) F Duxin	2	6	5
(Brazil) C Motta (Brazil) C Monteiro	6	4	7
(Switzerland) M Günthardt (United Kingdom) D Jevans	w/o
(Argentina) G Aubone (Argentina) R Giscafré
(United States) M Freedman (United States) B Hallquist	1
2	(United States) J Arias (United States) K Rinaldi	6

Second round
6	(United States) D Ralston (United States) S Walsh	6	6
(France) G Forget (France) F Thibault	1	3
(Australia) P Cash (United States) S Mascarin	1	4
4	(United States) S Stewart (Romania) L Romanov	6	6
Alt	(Argentina) R Carruthers (Chile) G Ohaco	4	5
(Brazil) C Motta (Brazil) C Monteiro	6	7
(Switzerland) M Günthardt (United Kingdom) D Jevans	5
2	(United States) J Arias (United States) K Rinaldi	7

Quarterfinals
6	(United States) D Ralston (United States) S Walsh	6	6	3
4	(United States) S Stewart (Romania) L Romanov	7	2	6
(Brazil) C Motta (Brazil) C Monteiro	6	6
2	(United States) J Arias (United States) K Rinaldi	2	1

Semifinals
4	(United States) S Stewart (Romania) L Romanov	2	4
(Brazil) C Motta (Brazil) C Monteiro	6	6
