= 1982 French Open =

- Date: 24 May – 6 June 1982
- Edition: 81
- Category: 52nd Grand Slam (ITF)
- Draw: 128S / 64D / 32X
- Surface: Clay / outdoor
- Location: Paris (XVI^{e}), France
- Venue: Stade Roland Garros

Champions

Men's singles
- (Sweden) Mats Wilander

Women's singles
- (United States) Martina Navratilova

Men's doubles
- (United States) Sherwood Stewart / (United States) Ferdi Taygan

Women's doubles
- (United States) Martina Navratilova / (United States) Anne Smith

Mixed doubles
- (Australia) Wendy Turnbull / (United Kingdom) John Lloyd
- French Open

The 1982 French Open was a tennis tournament that took place on the outdoor clay courts at the Stade Roland Garros in Paris, France. The tournament ran from 24 May until 6 June. It was the 81st staging of the French Open, and the first Grand Slam tennis event of 1982.

== Finals ==
=== Men's singles ===
(Sweden) Mats Wilander defeated (Argentina) Guillermo Vilas, 1–6, 7–6^{(8–6)}, 6–0, 6–4

- It was Wilander's 1st career title (and his 1st ATP title overall).

=== Women's singles ===
(United States) Martina Navratilova defeated (United States) Andrea Jaeger, 7–6^{(8-6)}, 6–1

- It was Navratilova's 8th title of the year, and her 63rd overall. It was her 4th career Grand Slam title, and her 1st French Open title.

=== Men's doubles ===
(United States) Sherwood Stewart / (United States) Ferdi Taygan defeated (Chile) Hans Gildemeister / (Chile) Belus Prajoux, 7–5, 6–3, 1–1, retired

=== Women's doubles ===
(United States) Martina Navratilova / (United States) Anne Smith defeated (United States) Rosemary Casals / (Australia) Wendy Turnbull, 6–3, 6–4

=== Mixed doubles ===
(Australia) Wendy Turnbull / (United Kingdom) John Lloyd defeated (Brazil) Cláudia Monteiro / (Brazil) Cássio Motta, 6–2, 7–6

== Prize money ==
Event		W	F	SF	QF	4R	3R	2R	1R
Singles	Men	FF400,950	FF200,450	FF100,200	FF50,750	FF29,400	FF16,050	FF9,350	FF5,350
Singles	Women	FF310,000	FF165,000	FF85,000	FF44,000	FF22,000	FF12,000	FF6,000	FF3,100

Total prize money for the event was FF4,708,120.

Preceded by 1981 Australian Open	Grand Slams	Succeeded by 1982 Wimbledon Championships
