= 1987 Belgian Open – Doubles =

Doubles
- 1987 Belgian Open

Final
- Champions: (West Germany) Bettina Bunge (Bulgaria) Manuela Maleeva
- Runners-up: (United States) Kathleen Horvath (Netherlands) Marcella Mesker
- Score: 4–6, 6–4, 6–4

Details
- Draw: 16
- Seeds: 4

Events
Singles	Doubles
- Belgian Open

In the inaugural edition of the tournament, Bettina Bunge and Manuela Maleeva won the title by defeating Kathleen Horvath and Marcella Mesker 4–6, 6–4, 6–4 in the final.

== Seeds ==
1. (West Germany) Bettina Bunge / (Bulgaria) Manuela Maleeva (champions)
2. (United States) Kathleen Horvath / (Netherlands) Marcella Mesker (final)
3. (Argentina) Gabriela Mosca / (Argentina) Mercedes Paz (quarterfinals)
4. (West Germany) Andrea Betzner / (West Germany) Christina Singer (semifinals)

== Draw ==
Key

- Q = Qualifier
- WC = Wild card
- LL = Lucky loser
- Alt = Alternate
- ITF = ITF entry
- PR = Protected ranking
- SR = Special ranking
- SE = Special exempt
- JE = Junior exempt
- JR = Junior Accelerator Programme entrant
- CO = College Accelerator Programme entrant
- NG = Next Gen Accelerator Program entrant
- w/o = Walkover
- r = Retired
- d = Defaulted

=== Draw ===
First round
1	(West Germany) B Bunge (Bulgaria) M Maleeva	6	6
(Belgium) S Appelmans (Belgium) C van Renterghem	0	2
(France) S Amiach (France) N Herreman	3	6	6
(Switzerland) C Cohen (Switzerland) E Krapl	6	2	1
4	(West Germany) A Betzner (West Germany) C Singer	6	7
(Belgium) K Schuurmans (United States) Erika Smith	2	6
(France) P Etchemendy (France) V Paquet	4	7	6
(Japan) Y Koizumi (Czechoslovakia) M Pazderová	6	5	0
(Netherlands) H ter Riet (Italy) F Bonsignori	6	3
(Netherlands) N Jagerman (Netherlands) S Schilder	7	6
(Netherlands) D Ketelaar (Australia) A Scott	2	5
3	(Argentina) G Mosca (Argentina) M Paz	6	7
(Belgium) A Devries (Belgium) S Wasserman	7	6
(Belgium) I de Ruysscher (New Zealand) R Seeman	5	3
(Switzerland) C Bartos-Cserepy (Argentina) M Pérez Roldán	2	0
2	(United States) K Horvath (Netherlands) M Mesker	6	6

Quarterfinals
1	(West Germany) B Bunge (Bulgaria) M Maleeva	7	6
(France) S Amiach (France) N Herreman	5	0
4	(West Germany) A Betzner (West Germany) C Singer	4	6	6
(France) P Etchemendy (France) V Paquet	6	2	2
(Netherlands) N Jagerman (Netherlands) S Schilder	2	7	6
3	(Argentina) G Mosca (Argentina) M Paz	6	5	1
(Belgium) A Devries (Belgium) S Wasserman	5	2
2	(United States) K Horvath (Netherlands) M Mesker	7	6

Semifinals
1	(West Germany) B Bunge (Bulgaria) M Maleeva	6	6
4	(West Germany) A Betzner (West Germany) C Singer	1	2
(Netherlands) N Jagerman (Netherlands) S Schilder	2	6	5
2	(United States) K Horvath (Netherlands) M Mesker	6	4	7

Final
1	(West Germany) B Bunge (Bulgaria) M Maleeva	4	6	6
2	(United States) K Horvath (Netherlands) M Mesker	6	4	4
