= Hugo Roverano =

Uruguayan tennis player

- Country (sports): Uruguay
- Born: 3 January 1958 (age 67)

Singles
- Career record: 1–2
- Highest ranking: No. 271 (26 December 1979)

Doubles
- Career record: 1–8
- Highest ranking: No. 251 (2 January 1984)

Grand Slam doubles results
- French Open: 1R (1979, 1982, 1983)

Grand Slam mixed doubles results
- French Open: 1R (1978, 1982)

Hugo Roverano (born 3 January 1958) is an Uruguayan former professional tennis player.

Between 1975 and 1985, Roverano featured in a total of nine ties for the Uruguay Davis Cup team. Most famously, in the 1978 tournament, he helped Uruguay secure the country's only Davis Cup win over Brazil. His win against Carlos Kirmayr gave Uruguay a 2–0 lead and he then partnered with José Luis Damiani to win in the doubles and secure the tie.

Roverano reached a career high singles ranking of 271 in the world while competing on the professional tour and appeared in the doubles main draws of the French Open. On the Grand Prix circuit he had a win over Steve Krulevitz as a qualifier in the Viña del Mar tournament in 1983, to make the second round.
