= 1987 Belgian Open – Singles =

Singles
- 1987 Belgian Open

Final
- Champion: (United States) Kathleen Horvath
- Runner-up: (West Germany) Bettina Bunge
- Score: 6–1, 7–6^{(7–5)}

Details
- Draw: 32 (4Q/1LL)
- Seeds: 8

Events
Singles	Doubles
- Belgian Open

In the inaugural edition of the tournament, Kathleen Horvath won the title by defeating Bettina Bunge 6–1, 7–6^{(7–5)} in the final.

== Seeds ==
1. (Bulgaria) Manuela Maleeva (first round)
2. (West Germany) Bettina Bunge (final)
3. (France) Nathalie Herreman (semifinals)
4. (Argentina) Mariana Pérez Roldán (second round)
5. (Italy) Laura Garrone (semifinals)
6. (West Germany) Isabel Cueto (quarterfinals)
7. (United States) Kathleen Horvath (champion)
8. (Greece) Angeliki Kanellopoulou (first round)

== Draw ==
Key

- Q = Qualifier
- WC = Wild card
- LL = Lucky loser
- Alt = Alternate
- ITF = ITF entry
- PR = Protected ranking
- SR = Special ranking
- SE = Special exempt
- JE = Junior exempt
- JR = Junior Accelerator Programme entrant
- CO = College Accelerator Programme entrant
- NG = Next Gen Accelerator Program entrant
- w/o = Walkover
- r = Retired
- d = Defaulted

=== Finals ===
Semifinals
5	(Italy) Laura Garrone	4	2
7	(United States) Kathleen Horvath	6	6
3	(France) Nathalie Herreman	5	2
2	(West Germany) Bettina Bunge	7	6

Final
7	(United States) Kathleen Horvath	6	7^{7}
2	(West Germany) Bettina Bunge	1	6^{5}

=== Top half ===
First round
1	(Bulgaria) M Maleeva	3	6	3
(Italy) F Bonsignori	6	1	6
(Belgium) S Appelmans	3	6	6
(Netherlands) N Schutte	6	2	3
(Netherlands) H ter Riet	7	6
(West Germany) C Singer	6	1
(Italy) S La Fratta	3	1
5	(Italy) L Garrone	6	6
4	(Argentina) M Pérez Roldán	4	6	7
(West Germany) A Betzner	6	4	6
(Japan) Y Koizumi	1	4
(Belgium) A Devries	6	6
(Switzerland) E Krapl	7	1	6
(Belgium) S Wasserman	5	6	3
(Netherlands) N Jagerman	4	3
7	(United States) K Horvath	6	6

Second round
(Italy) F Bonsignori	3	6	6
(Belgium) S Appelmans	6	4	0
(Netherlands) H ter Riet	2	7	0
5	(Italy) L Garrone	6	6	6
4	(Argentina) M Pérez Roldán	4	3
(Belgium) A Devries	6	6
(Switzerland) E Krapl	3	5
7	(United States) K Horvath	6	7

Quarterfinals
(Italy) F Bonsignori	6	5	3
5	(Italy) L Garrone	2	7	6
(Belgium) A Devries	4	3
7	(United States) K Horvath	6	6

Semifinals
5	(Italy) L Garrone	4	2
7	(United States) K Horvath	6	6

=== Bottom half ===
First round
8	(Greece) A Kanellopoulou	4	3
Q	(Socialist Federal Republic of Yugoslavia) M Jaušovec	6	6
(Switzerland) C Bartos-Cserepy	2	6	1
(Argentina) M Paz	6	3	6
Q	(Netherlands) S Schilder	6	6
(Belgium) K Schuurmans	0	0
LL	(Italy) S Simmonds	5	3
3	(France) N Herreman	7	6
6	(West Germany) I Cueto	6	6
Q	(Austria) K Oberleitner	1	0
Q	(France) S Niox-Château	6	6
(Italy) C Nozzoli	3	3
(France) P Etchemendy	6	6
(Netherlands) M Mesker	4	1
(France) A Dechaume	4	2
2	(West Germany) B Bunge	6	6

Second round
Q	(Socialist Federal Republic of Yugoslavia) M Jaušovec	6	0	1
(Argentina) M Paz	2	6	6
Q	(Netherlands) S Schilder	4	1
3	(France) N Herreman	6	6
6	(West Germany) I Cueto	6	6
Q	(France) S Niox-Château	1	0
(France) P Etchemendy	4	2
2	(West Germany) B Bunge	6	6

Quarterfinals
(Argentina) M Paz	2	6	6
3	(France) N Herreman	6	3	7
6	(West Germany) I Cueto	2	1
2	(West Germany) B Bunge	6	6

Semifinals
3	(France) N Herreman	5	2
2	(West Germany) B Bunge	7	6
