= Brian Sharp =

Australian rules footballer

Personal information
- Full name: Ronald Brian John Sharp
- Born: 21 December 1939; Reservoir, Victoria
- Died: 13 March 2004 (aged 64); Colac, Victoria
- Original team: Colac
- Height: 189 cm (6 ft 2 in)
- Weight: 87 kg (192 lb)

Playing career^{1}
Years	Club	Games (Goals)
1959	Geelong	1 (0)
- ^{1} Playing statistics correct to the end of 1959.

Ronald Brian John Sharp (21 December 1939 – 13 March 2004) was an Australian rules footballer who played with Geelong in the Victorian Football League (VFL).
