= Knokke-Zoute Airfield =

Former airfield in Belgium

Knokke-Het Zoute Airfield Advanced Landing Ground B-83

Site information
- Type: Military/Civilian Airfield

Location
- Coordinates: 51°21′21″N 003°20′56″E

Site history
- In use: 1929-1960
- Battles/wars: World War II

Airfield information
- IATA: none; ICAO: none

Summary
- Coordinates: 51°21′21″N 003°20′56″E

Map
- Location of Knokke-Zoute Airfield

Runways
Direction	Length		Surface
Direction	ft	m	Surface
12/30	3,600	1,090	SMT
18/36	4,500	1,363	SMT

Knokke-Zoute Airfield is a former airfield, located 5 km east of Knokke-Heist in West Flanders, Belgium. It was closed in 1960 and is now in agricultural use.

== History ==
Originally constructed in 1929 between Knokke and the Zwin natural reserve. Initially serving civilian aviation, both by private pilots and airlines such as Sabena, it became a Belgian Air Force field by the late 1930s. At the outbreak of the German invasion of Belgium in May 1940, it was home to 6e Escadrille (Squadron) of 3rd Group flying Fairey Foxes tasked with firing exercises over the North Sea. The squadron was evacuated prior to the airfield being attacked by the German Luftwaffe on 10 May. The Belgian Air Force ordered the field destroyed before it was seized by the German Army on 18 May.

During the German occupation of Belgium it was used for the training of Anti-Aircraft FLAK units and aircraft hangars were constructed, however it was not used as a Luftwaffe airfield. It was attacked by the Royal Air Force in 1942, and in 1944 the airfield was ordered destroyed by the Germans. Trenches were dug to destroy the runways and the area was mined.

The area was liberated by Canadian Army forces in October 1944 and aviation engineers de-mined and constructed twin temporary runways on the airfield. It was designated Advanced Landing Ground B-83.

B-83 was used operationally by:

- 119 RAF Sqn flying Albacore Mk I (Oct 1944 to May 1945)
- 276 RAF Sqn flying Spitfire Mk Vb (Dec 1944 - June 1945)
- 290 RAF Sqn flying Spitfire Mk Vb (Feb 1945 - Oct 1945)

After 1945, it was abandoned by the military and turned over to the Belgian Government. It reverted to civilian use until 1960 when the facility was closed. The former airfield/airport has been dismantled and is now used for agriculture.
