= Roberto Carruthers =

- Country (sports): Argentina

Singles
- Career record: 0–2
- Highest ranking: No. 272 (14 June 1976)

Doubles
- Career record: 7–12

Grand Slam doubles results
- French Open: 2R (1981)
- Wimbledon: 3R (1981)

Grand Slam mixed doubles results
- French Open: 2R (1982)

Roberto Carruthers is an Argentine tennis coach and former professional player.

Known as "Kiko", Carruthers competed during the 1970s and 1980s, most successfully as a doubles player. He won two doubles titles on the ATP Challenger Tour and featured in the main draws at both the French Open and Wimbledon.

Carruthers was the first coach of Gastón Gaudio, whom he took under his guidance at the Temperley Lawn Tennis club when the future French Open champion was 12 years of age. He also coached Guillermo Pérez Roldán on tour.

== ATP Challenger titles ==
=== Doubles: (2) ===
No.	Date	Tournament	Surface	Partner	Opponents	Score
1.	Dec 1980	Buenos Aires Challenger; Buenos Aires, Argentina	Clay	(Argentina) Ricardo Cano	(Argentina) Alejandro Gattiker (Argentina) Carlos Gattiker	6–2 6–4
2.	Feb 1981	Río de la Plata Challenger; Buenos Aires, Argentina	Clay	(Argentina) Carlos Landó	(United States) Charles Strode (United States) Morris Strode	0–6, 6–1, 6–3
