= Palm Beach Cup =

Defunct tennis tournament
- Event name: Citizen Cup (1982); Murjani Cup (1983); Palm Beach Cup (1985)
- Tour: WTA Tour (1982–85)
- Founded: 1982
- Abolished: 1985
- Editions: 3
- Surface: Clay (1982–85)

The Palm Beach Cup is a defunct WTA Tour affiliated tennis tournament played from 1982 to 1985. It was held at the Frenchman's Creek Beach & Country Club in Palm Beach Gardens, Florida in the United States and played on outdoor clay courts.

Chris Evert was the most successful player at the tournament, winning the singles competition twice.

== Results ==
=== Singles ===
Year	Champions	Runners-up	Score
1982	(United States) Chris Evert-Lloyd	(United States) Andrea Jaeger	6–1, 7–5
1983	(United States) Chris Evert-Lloyd	(United States) Andrea Jaeger	6–3, 6–3
1984	Not held		
1985	(United States) Kathleen Horvath	(Switzerland) Petra Jauch-Delhees	3–6, 6–3, 6–3

=== Doubles ===
Year	Champions	Runners-up	Score
1982	(United States) Rosemary Casals (Australia) Wendy Turnbull	(Australia) Evonne Goolagong Cawley (Netherlands) Betty Stöve	6–1, 7–6
1983	(United States) Barbara Potter (United States) Sharon Walsh	(United States) Kathy Jordan (United States) Paula Smith	6–4, 4–6, 6–2
1984	Not held		
1985	(United States) JoAnne Russell (United States) Anne Smith	(Peru) Laura Gildemeister (Argentina) Gabriela Sabatini	1–6, 6–1, 7–6
