= 1985 BMW Championships Marco Island =

- Date: January 28 – February 3
- Edition: 3rd
- Draw: 56S / 32D
- Prize money: $100,000
- Surface: Hard / outdoor
- Location: Marco Island, Florida, U.S.
- Venue: Marriott Marco Beach Resort

Champions

Singles
- (United States) Bonnie Gadusek

Doubles
- (United States) Kathy Jordan / (Australia) Elizabeth Smylie
← 1984 ·	BMW Championships Marco Island	· 1986 →

The 1985 BMW Championships, also known as the BMW Challenge, was a women's tennis tournament played on indoor carpet courts at the Marriott Marco Beach Resort in Marco Island, Florida, United States. It was part of the 1984–85 Virginia Slims World Championship Series (Note: The 1984 Virginia Slims World Championship Series ran from March 1984 through March 1985.) and was played from January 28 through February 3, 1985. Second-seeded Bonnie Gadusek won the singles title.

== Finals ==
=== Singles ===
(United States) Bonnie Gadusek defeated (United States) Pam Casale 6–3, 6–4

- It was Gadusek's 1st singles title of the year and the 2nd of her career.

=== Doubles ===
(United States) Kathy Jordan / (Australia) Elizabeth Smylie defeated (United States) Camille Benjamin / (United States) Bonnie Gadusek 6–3, 6–3
