= Avon Cup =

Defunct tennis tournament
- Event name: Avon Cup (1983–84); BMW Championships (1985); Tournament of Champions (1986)
- Tour: WTA Tour
- Founded: 1983
- Abolished: 1986
- Editions: 4
- Surface: Clay (1983–84, 1986); Hard (1985)

The Avon Cup is a defunct WTA Tour affiliated women's tennis tournament played from 1983 to 1986. It was held on Marco Island, Florida and played on outdoor clay courts from 1983 to 1984 and again in 1986 and on outdoor hard courts in 1985. The event was sponsored by Avon Products and BMW during its tenure and was known as the Tournament of Champions in its final year.

The only woman to win the singles event more than once was Bonnie Gadusek.

== Past finals ==
=== Singles ===
Year	Tournament	Champions	Runners-up	Score
1983	Avon Cup	(United States) Andrea Jaeger	(Czechoslovakia) Hana Mandlíková	6–1, 6–3
1984	Avon Cup	(United States) Bonnie Gadusek	(United States) Kathleen Horvath	3–6, 6–0, 6–4
1985	BMW Championships	(United States) Bonnie Gadusek	(United States) Pam Casale	6–3, 6–4
1986	edition was part of the Tournament of Champions			

=== Doubles ===
Year	Champions	Runners-up	Score
1983	(United States) Andrea Jaeger (United States) Mary-Lou Piatek	(United States) Rosemary Casals (Australia) Wendy Turnbull	7–5, 6–4
1984	(Czechoslovakia) Hana Mandlíková (Czechoslovakia) Helena Suková	(United States) Andrea Jaeger (United Kingdom) Anne Hobbs	3–6, 6–2, 6–2
1985	(United States) Kathy Jordan (Australia) Elizabeth Sayers	(United States) Camille Benjamin (United States) Bonnie Gadusek	6–3, 6–3
1986	edition was part of the Tournament of Champions		
