= Petra Jauch-Delhees =

Swiss tennis player

- Country (sports): Switzerland
- Born: 28 March 1959 (age 65); Aarau, Switzerland
- Height: 1.75 m (5 ft 9 in)
- Plays: Left-handed
- Prize money: $123,967

Singles
- Career record: 16–10

Grand Slam singles results
- Australian Open: 2R (1982)
- French Open: 3R (1980), 1983)
- Wimbledon: 2R (1981, 1982, 1983)
- US Open: 4R (1984)

Doubles
- Career record: 7–8
- Career titles: 1 WTA

Grand Slam doubles results
- Australian Open: 1R (1982)
- French Open: 2R (1980)
- Wimbledon: 2R (1983)
- US Open: 3R (1983)

Petra Jauch-Delhees (born 28 March 1959), born Petra Delhees, is a former professional tennis player from Switzerland.

== Biography ==
Delhees, a left-hander, began playing Federation Cup tennis for Switzerland as a 17-year old in 1976. She was a member of the 1981 and 1983 Swiss semifinal teams, the latter her final season. She finished with a 33-15 overall record, at the time the Swiss record for the number of wins. Her doubles partnership with Christiane Jolissaint, which resulted in ten wins, is the most prolific in the Fed Cup for Switzerland.

From 1983 she was known as Petra Jauch-Delhees after marrying German Peter Jauch. She was a doubles finalist with Patricia Medrado at the 1983 Swiss Open.

She had her best performance at Grand Slam level when she upset sixth seed Manuela Maleeva in the first round of the 1984 US Open and made it to the round of 16 stage, despite entering the draw as a qualifier.

In 1985 was runner-up to Kathy Horvath at the Palm Beach Cup and won the Spanish Open doubles with Patricia Medrado. This was her last year of professional tennis and she retired after the 1985 French Open.

== WTA career finals ==
=== Singles (0–1) ===
Result	W/L	Date	Tournament	Tier	Surface	Opponent	Score
Loss	0–1	Mar 1985	Palm Beach Cup, U.S.	$100,000	Clay	(United States) Kathy Horvath	6–3, 3–6, 3–6

=== Doubles (1–1) ===
Result	W/L	Date	Tournament	Tier	Surface	Partner	Opponents	Score
Loss	0–1	May 1983	Swiss Open, Lugano	$50,000	Clay	(Brazil) Patricia Medrado	(Netherlands) Marcella Mesker (Switzerland) Christiane Jolissaint	2–6, 6–3, 5–7
Win	1–1	May 1985	Spanish Open, Barcelona	$50,000	Clay	(Brazil) Patricia Medrado	(United States) Penny Barg (Argentina) Adriana Villagrán	6–1, 6–0
