= Andrea Jaeger =

American tennis player (born 1965)

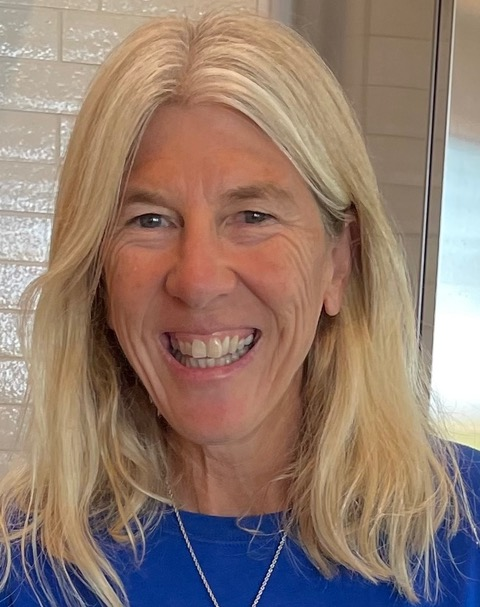
- Jaeger in 2024
- Country (sports): United States
- Born: June 4, 1965 (age 61) Chicago, Illinois, US
- Height: 5 ft 6 in (1.68 m)
- Turned pro: 1980
- Retired: 1985
- Plays: Right-handed (two handed-backhand)
- Prize money: US$ 1,379,065

Singles
- Career record: 260–85
- Career titles: 10
- Highest ranking: No. 2 (August 17, 1981)

Grand Slam singles results
- Australian Open: SF (1982)
- French Open: F (1982)
- Wimbledon: F (1983)
- US Open: SF (1980, 1982)

Other tournaments
- Olympic Games: 2R (1984)

Doubles
- Career record: 47–38
- Career titles: 4

Grand Slam doubles results
- Australian Open: 3R (1981, 1982)
- French Open: QF (1982)
- Wimbledon: 3R (1981)
- US Open: SF (1980)

Mixed doubles
- Career titles: 1

Grand Slam mixed doubles results
- French Open: W (1981)
- Wimbledon: 1R (1980, 1983)

Andrea Jaeger (/ˈjeɪɡər/ YAY-gər; born June 4, 1965) is an American former professional tennis player. She started her professional tennis career at the age of 14 and went on to win pro tennis tournaments while still competing in other junior tennis events. By the age of 16, she was the second ranked female professional tennis player in the world. She reached the singles finals at the French Open in 1982 and at Wimbledon in 1983. She also reached the singles semifinals at the Australian Open and the U.S. Open. During her career, she won 10 singles titles. In mixed doubles, she won the French Open with Jimmy Arias in 1981. She reached a career-high singles ranking of world No. 2.

After sustaining a shoulder injury in 1984, Jaeger shifted her focus from professional tennis to humanitarian projects she had begun as a teenager. She committed her tennis earnings to developing programs that provide support to children with cancer and those in need. Now in its 39th year, her initiative offers financial assistance and various care services to affected children and their families. Nelson Mandela once visited to recognize the work of her foundation.

At 19, a shoulder injury abruptly ended her tennis career. In 2006, she joined the Anglican Dominican order, but left in 2009.

== Early life ==
Andrea Jaeger was born on June 4, 1965, in Chicago. Her parents, Roland and Ilse Jaeger, are both deceased. Jaeger grew up in Skokie and Lincolnshire, Illinois.

== Tennis career ==
While a student at Stevenson High School, Jaeger was the top-ranked player in the United States in the 18-and-under age group. She won 13 U.S. national junior titles, including the most prominent junior titles in tennis: the 1979 Orange Bowl and 1979 Boca Raton.

In 1980 (at the age of 15 years, 19 days), Jaeger became the youngest player ever to be seeded at Wimbledon, a record that was broken by Jennifer Capriati in 1990. After defeating former champion Virginia Wade, she became the youngest quarterfinalist in the history of the tournament. Later in the year, she became the youngest semifinalist in US Open history. By the age of 16, she had become the second ranked female professional tennis player in the world.

Jaeger became a household name on the front pages of news publications, notable magazines and appearances on TV. People Magazine, Sports Illustrated, Life Magazine visited her junior high and high school. One of her endorsement commercials featured Jaeger with Bjorn Borg and another with her Mom, highlighting a new way of viewing sports prodigies.

At the French Open in 1982, Jaeger defeated Chris Evert in the semifinal 6–3, 6–1 but lost the final to Martina Navratilova. She then reached the semifinals of both the US Open and the Australian Open, losing both matches to Evert in straight sets. Jaeger and Evert met 10 times in all in 1982, with Jaeger winning three of the first five but losing the last five in a row.

At Wimbledon in 1983, Jaeger defeated six-time Wimbledon singles champion Billie Jean King 6–1, 6–1 in a semifinal on Centre Court, which was King's last career singles match at that tournament and her most lopsided singles defeat at Wimbledon. Jaeger then lost the final to Navratilova.

Jaeger won eight of the nine singles matches she played for the U.S. in Fed Cup. She also won two of the three Wightman Cup singles matches she played for the U.S., resulting in the U.S. winning Fed Cup and Wightman Cup trophies.

A major shoulder injury at the age of 19 ended Jaeger's career in 1985. Jaeger obtained a degree in theology and ministry training.

During her career, Jaeger won U.S. $1.4 million in prize money and had endorsement deals with clothing, racket, shoes, watch and fast food restaurants.

== Philanthropy ==
Jaeger used her winnings from tennis to create the Silver Lining Foundation in 1990. The foundation's purpose was to provide long-term care to children with cancer and children in need. Originally located in Aspen, Colorado, the organization transported groups of young cancer patients to Aspen for a week of support and activities, including horseback riding and whitewater rafting. The foundation also provided money for programs for children who could not travel. The first contributor was John McEnroe. Many high-profile celebrities were involved, including Andre Agassi, Pete Sampras, David Robinson, Cindy Crawford, David Foster and Kevin Costner. The foundation was later renamed ‘Little Star Foundation’, paying tribute to Rhea Olsen, a teenager with cancer from Chicago. Olsen became best friends with Jaeger and became the first-ever paid employee of the Foundation. Jaeger helped Olsen for years before her death.

In 1996, Jaeger received the Samuel S. Beard Award for Greatest Public Service by an Individual 35 Years or Under, an award given annually by Jefferson Awards.

In 1999, Jaeger received the Jackie Robinson Humanitarian Award from the American Sport Art Museum and Archives (ASAMA).

Jaeger's autobiography, First Service, was published in 2004. In the book, she discussed her teenage years as a tennis player and her focus on serving God. All proceeds from the book were donated to children's charities.

In the aftermath of Hurricane Sandy, and other natural disasters, Jaeger's Foundation provided food, medical, daily, educational and recreational supplies and support to help.

In April 2007, Jaeger and several former athletes, including Andre Agassi, Lance Armstrong, Tony Hawk, Jackie Joyner-Kersee, and Muhammad Ali, appeared on the American morning television talk show Good Morning America to announce their formation of a charity called Athletes for Hope.

Jaeger's Little Star Foundation has a podcast called Little Star Light. Guests have included David Agus, Jill Bolte Taylor, Christine Brennan, Cindy Crawford, David Foster, Tony Hawk, Judy Jordan, Dallas Jenkins, Samina Khan, Nancy Lieberman, Patrick McEnroe, Anne Drysdale, Joe Moravsky, Brian Sharp, Michael Singer, and Leslie Visser.

In September 2025, Jaeger attended the unveiling of a "Pressure is a Privilege" plaque honoring Billie Jean King at the USTA Billie Jean King National Tennis Center during the U.S. Open. She reflected on her 1983 Wimbledon semifinal against King, describing it as an honor to share the court with her, and said that King's phrase "Pressure is a privilege" continues to influence her outlook and charitable work.

== Personal life ==
Jaeger currently resides in Santa Rosa Beach, Florida.

== Major finals ==
=== Grand Slam finals ===
==== Singles: 2 runner-ups ====
Result	Year	Championship	Surface	Opponent	Score
Loss	1982	French Open	Clay	(United States) Martina Navratilova	6–7^{(6–8)}, 1–6
Loss	1983	Wimbledon	Grass	(United States) Martina Navratilova	0–6, 3–6

==== Mixed doubles: 1 title ====
Result	Year	Championship	Surface	Partner	Opponents	Score
Win	1981	French Open	Clay	(United States) Jimmy Arias	(Netherlands) Betty Stöve (United States) Fred McNair	7–6, 6–4

=== Year-end championships finals ===
==== Singles: 1 runner-up ====
Result	Year	Championship	Surface	Opponent	Score
Loss	1981	New York City	Carpet (i)	(United States) Martina Navratilova	3–6, 6–7^{(3–7)}

== WTA career finals ==
=== Singles: 36 (10–26) ===
Legend Grand Slam tournaments (0–2) WTA Tour Championships (0–1) Virginia Slims, Avon Futures, Other (10–23)	Titles by surface Hard (3–7) Grass (1–3) Clay (2–9) Carpet (4–7)

Result	No.	Date	Tournament	Surface	Opponent	Score
Win	1.	Jan 1980	Las Vegas, US	Hard (i)	(United States) Barbara Potter	7–6, 4–6, 6–1
Loss	1.	Mar 1980	Edmond, US	Clay	(Czechoslovakia) Regina Maršíková	2–6, 2–6
Win	2.	Jun 1980	Beckenham, England	Grass	(United Kingdom) Jo Durie	6–0, 6–1
Loss	2.	Aug, 1980	Indianapolis, US	Clay	(United States) Chris Evert-Lloyd	4–6, 3–6
Loss	3.	Aug 1980	Mahwah, US	Hard	(Czechoslovakia) Hana Mandlíková	7–6^{(7–0)}, 2–6, 2–6
Win	3.	Sep 1980	Las Vegas, US	Hard (i)	(Czechoslovakia) Hana Mandlíková	7–5, 4–6, 6–3
Loss	4.	Oct 1980	Deerfield Beach, US	Hard	(United States) Chris Evert-Lloyd	4–6, 1–6
Win	4.	Nov 1980	Tampa, US	Hard	(United States) Tracy Austin	w/o
Loss	5.	Jan 1981	Landover, US	Carpet (i)	(United States) Tracy Austin	2–6, 2–6
Win	5.	Jan 1981	Kansas City, US	Carpet (i)	(United States) Martina Navratilova	3–6, 6–3, 7–5
Win	6.	Feb 1981	Oakland, US	Carpet (i)	(United Kingdom) Virginia Wade	6–3, 6–1
Loss	6.	Mar 1981	Los Angeles, US	Carpet (i)	(United States) Martina Navratilova	4–6, 0–6
Loss	7.	Mar 1981	Avon Championships, US	Carpet (i)	(United States) Martina Navratilova	3–6, 6–7^{(3–7)}
Loss	8.	Apr 1981	Orlando, US	Clay	(United States) Martina Navratilova	5–7, 3–6
Loss	9.	Jun 1981	Eastbourne, England	Grass	(United States) Tracy Austin	3–6, 4–6
Win	7.	Aug 1981	Indianapolis, US	Clay	(Romania) Virginia Ruzici	6–1, 6–0
Loss	10.	Oct, 1981	Deerfield Beach, US	Hard	(United States) Chris Evert-Lloyd	6–4, 3–6, 0–6
Loss	11.	Nov 1981	Perth, Australia	Grass	(United States) Pam Shriver	1–6, 6–7
Loss	12.	Jan 1982	Seattle, US	Carpet (i)	(United States) Martina Navratilova	2–6, 0–6
Win	8.	Feb 1982	Detroit, US	Carpet (i)	(Socialist Federal Republic of Yugoslavia) Mima Jaušovec	2–6, 6–4, 6–2
Win	9.	Feb 1982	Oakland, US	Carpet (i)	(United States) Chris Evert-Lloyd	7–6^{(7–5)}, 6–4
Loss	13.	Apr 1982	Palm Beach Gardens, US	Clay	(United States) Chris Evert-Lloyd	1–6, 5–7
Loss	14.	Apr 1982	Hilton Head Island, US	Clay	(United States) Martina Navratilova	4–6, 2–6
Loss	15.	Apr 1982	Amelia Island, US	Clay	(United States) Chris Evert-Lloyd	3–6, 1–6
Loss	16.	May 1982	French Open	Clay	(United States) Martina Navratilova	6–7^{(6–8)}, 1–6
Loss	17.	Aug 1982	Montreal, Canada	Hard	(United States) Martina Navratilova	3–6, 5–7
Loss	18.	Oct 1982	Deerfield Beach, US	Hard	(United States) Chris Evert-Lloyd	1–6, 1–6
Loss	19.	Oct 1982	Tampa, US	Hard	(United States) Chris Evert-Lloyd	6–3, 1–6, 4–6
Loss	20.	Nov, 1982	Tokyo, Japan	Carpet (i)	(United States) Chris Evert-Lloyd	3–6, 2–6
Win	10.	Jan 1983	Marco Island, US	Clay	(Czechoslovakia) Hana Mandlíková	6–1, 6–3
Loss	21.	Jan 1983	Palm Beach Gardens, US	Clay	(United States) Chris Evert-Lloyd	3–6, 3–6
Loss	22.	Feb 1983	Chicago, US	Carpet (i)	(United States) Martina Navratilova	3–6, 2–6
Loss	23.	Apr 1983	Orlando, US	Clay	(United States) Martina Navratilova	1–6, 5–7
Loss	24.	Jun 1983	Wimbledon, England	Grass	(United States) Martina Navratilova	0–6, 3–6
Loss	25.	Sep 1983	Tokyo, Japan	Carpet (i)	(United States) Lisa Bonder	2–6, 7–5, 1–6
Loss	26.	Apr 1984	Johannesburg, South Africa	Hard (i)	(United States) Chris Evert-Lloyd	3–6, 0–6

=== Doubles: 6 (4–2) ===
Winner — Legend Grand Slam tournaments (0–0) WTA Tour Championships (0–0) Virginia Slims, Avon Futures, Other (4–2)	Titles by surface Hard (3–0) Grass (0–0) Clay (1–2) Carpet (0–0)

Result	No.	Date	Tournament	Surface	Partner	Opponents	Score
Win	1.	Aug 1980	Toronto, Canada	Hard	(Czechoslovakia) Regina Maršíková	(United States) Ann Kiyomura (United States) Betsy Nagelsen	6–1, 6–3
Win	2.	Oct 1980	Deerfield Beach, US	Hard	(Czechoslovakia) Regina Maršíková	(United States) Martina Navratilova (United States) Candy Reynolds	1–6, 6–1, 6–2
Win	3.	Jan 1983	Marco Island, US	Clay	(United States) Mary-Lou Piatek	(United States) Rosie Casals (Australia) Wendy Turnbull	7–5, 6–4
Loss	1.	Apr 1983	Hilton Head Island, US	Clay	(United States) Paula Smith	(United States) Martina Navratilova (United States) Candy Reynolds	2–6, 3–6
Win	4.	Aug 1983	Toronto, Canada	Hard	(United Kingdom) Anne Hobbs	(South Africa) Rosalyn Fairbank (United States) Candy Reynolds	6–4, 5–7, 7–5
Loss	2.	Jan 1984	Marco Island, US	Clay	(United Kingdom) Anne Hobbs	(Czechoslovakia) Hana Mandlíková (Czechoslovakia) Helena Suková	6–3, 2–6, 2–6

== Grand Slam singles performance timeline ==
Key
W	F	SF	QF	#R	RR	Q#	DNQ	A	NH

(W) winner; (F) finalist; (SF) semifinalist; (QF) quarterfinalist; (#R) rounds 4, 3, 2, 1; (RR) round-robin stage; (Q#) qualification round; (DNQ) did not qualify; (A) absent; (NH) not held; (SR) strike rate (events won / competed); (W–L) win–loss record.

Tournament	1979	1980	1981	1982	1983	1984	1985	Career SR
Australian Open	A	A	QF	SF	A	A	A	0 / 2
French Open	A	1R	SF	F	SF	1R	2R	0 / 6
Wimbledon	A	QF	4R	4R	F	A	A	0 / 4
U.S. Open	2R	SF	2R	SF	QF	A	2R	0 / 6
SR	0 / 1	0 / 3	0 / 4	0 / 4	0 / 3	0 / 1	0 / 2	0 / 18
Year-end ranking	NR	7	4	3	3	42	NR	

== See also ==
- Performance timelines for all female tennis players since 1978 who reached at least one Grand Slam final

Awards
Preceded by Kathy Jordan	WTA Newcomer of the Year; 1980	Succeeded by Kathy Rinaldi
