= Kathleen Horvath =

American tennis player

- Country (sports): United States
- Residence: Short Hills, New Jersey, U.S.
- Born: August 25, 1965 (age 61) Chicago, Illinois, U.S.
- Height: 5 ft 6 1/2 in (1.69 m)
- Turned pro: 1981
- Retired: 1989
- Plays: Right-handed (two-handed backhand)
- Prize money: $570,414

Singles
- Career record: 176–154
- Career titles: 6
- Highest ranking: No. 10 (June 11, 1984)

Grand Slam singles results
- Australian Open: 1R (1989)
- French Open: QF (1983, 1984)
- Wimbledon: 3R (1986)
- US Open: 3R (1981, 1986)

Other tournaments
- Olympic Games: QF (1984)

Doubles
- Career record: 150–132
- Career titles: 3
- Highest ranking: No. 45 (September 12, 1988)

Grand Slam doubles results
- Australian Open: 2R (1989)
- French Open: SF (1982, 1984)
- Wimbledon: 3R (1982)
- US Open: 3R (1985)

Grand Slam mixed doubles results
- Australian Open: 1R (1989)
- French Open: SF (1981)
- Wimbledon: 1R (1986)
- US Open: SF (1985)

Erica Kathleen "Kathy" Horvath (born August 25, 1965) is an American former professional tennis player. She is best known for upsetting world No. 1 Martina Navratilova in the fourth round of the 1983 French Open, delivering her only defeat for the season.

== Career ==
Horvath was the youngest player to play in the US Open in 1979 at 14 years and five days — this record still stands. She was the youngest player to win the U.S. National 16 and under in 1979. She also is the only player to ever win all four age groups in the U.S. Girls Clay Courts in all consecutive years.

She played on the WTA Tour from 1981 to 1989, winning six singles titles and reaching a career-high ranking of world No. 10 in 1984. She reached the quarterfinals at the French Open in 1983 and 1984. She retired with a 176–154 singles record.

Horvath was the only player to defeat Martina Navratilova in the 1983 season (at the French Open), winning in the fourth round in three sets. Navratilova's coaches (Renee Richards and Nancy Lieberman) argued in the stands over strategy, something Navratilova noticed during the match.

Horvath had career victories over Navratilova, Andrea Jaeger, Manuela Maleeva, Gabriela Sabatini, Dianne Fromholtz, Claudia Kohde-Kilsch, Mary Joe Fernández, Betty Stöve, and Sylvia Hanika. She was a member of the 1984 United States Fed Cup team. Horvath played in the 1984 Olympics when tennis was reintroduced as a demonstration sport and was the first seed. She was coached by Harry Hopman and Nick Bollettieri.

After her tennis career, she got her BS and MBA at the Wharton School of Business and then worked on Wall Street until 2003.

== WTA career finals ==
=== Singles 9: (6–3) ===
Winner — Legend Grand Slam tournaments (0–0) WTA Tour Championships (0–0) Virginia Slims, Avon, other (6–3)	Finals by surface Hard (0–0) Grass (0–0) Clay (2–3) Carpet (4–0)

Result	W/L	Date	Tournament	Surface	Opponent	Score
Win	1–0	Jan 1981	Montreal, Canada	Carpet (i)	(United States) Candy Reynolds	6–4, 7–6
Win	2–0	Mar 1983	Nashville, US	Carpet (i)	(Czechoslovakia) Marcela Skuherská	6–4, 6–3
Loss	2–1	May 1983	Berlin, West Germany	Clay	(United States) Chris Evert-Lloyd	4–6, 6–7^{(1–7)}
Win	3–1	Nov 1983	Honolulu, US	Carpet	(Canada) Carling Bassett	4–6, 6–2, 7–6^{(7–1)}
Loss	3–2	Jan 1984	Marco Island, US	Clay	(United States) Bonnie Gadusek	6–3, 0–6, 4–6
Loss	3–3	May 1984	Berlin, West Germany	Clay	(West Germany) Claudia Kohde-Kilsch	6–7^{(8–10)}, 1–6
Win	4–3	Mar 1985	Indianapolis, US	Carpet (i)	(United States) Elise Burgin	6–2, 6–4
Win	5–3	Mar 1985	Palm Beach Gardens, US	Clay	(Switzerland) Petra Jauch-Delhees	3–6, 6–3, 6–3
Win	6–3	Jul 1987	Knokke, Belgium	Clay	(West Germany) Bettina Bunge	6–1, 7–6^{(7–5)}

=== Doubles 9: (3–6) ===
Winner — Legend Grand Slam tournaments (0–0) WTA Tour Championships (0–0) Virginia Slims (3–6)	Finals by surface Hard (0–0) Grass (0–0) Clay (2–6) Carpet (1–0)

Result	W/L	Date	Tournament	Surface	Partner	Opponents	Score
Win	1–0	May 1982	Perugia, Italy	Clay	(South Africa) Yvonne Vermaak	(United States) Billie Jean King (South Africa) Ilana Kloss	2–6, 6–4, 7–6
Win	2–0	Aug 1983	Indianapolis, US	Clay	(Romania) Virginia Ruzici	(United States) Gigi Fernández (United States) Beth Herr	4–6, 7–6, 6–2
Loss	2–1	May 1984	Berlin, West Germany	Clay	(Romania) Virginia Ruzici	(United Kingdom) Anne Hobbs (United States) Candy Reynolds	3–6, 6–4, 6–7^{(11–13)}
Loss	2–2	May 1984	Perugia, Italy	Clay	(Romania) Virginia Ruzici	(Czechoslovakia) Iva Budařová (Czechoslovakia) Helena Suková	6–7^{(5–7)}, 6–1, 4–6
Win	3–2	Mar 1985	Indianapolis, US	Carpet (i)	(United States) Elise Burgin	(South Africa) Jennifer Mundel (United States) Molly Van Nostrand	6–4, 6–1
Loss	3–3	Apr 1985	Orlando, US	Clay	(United States) Elise Burgin	(United States) Martina Navratilova (United States) Pam Shriver	3–6, 1–6
Loss	3–4	May 1987	Strasbourg, France	Clay	(Netherlands) Marcella Mesker	(Czechoslovakia) Jana Novotná (France) Catherine Suire	0–6, 2–6
Loss	3–5	Jul 1987	Knokke, Belgium	Clay	(Netherlands) Marcella Mesker	(West Germany) Bettina Bunge (Bulgaria) Manuela Maleeva	6–4, 4–6, 4–6
Loss	3–6	Oct 1987	Athens, Greece	Clay	(South Africa) Dinky Van Rensburg	(West Germany) Andrea Betzner (Austria) Judith Wiesner	4–6, 6–7^{(0–7)}

== Grand Slam singles performance timeline ==
Key
W	F	SF	QF	#R	RR	Q#	DNQ	A	NH

(W) winner; (F) finalist; (SF) semifinalist; (QF) quarterfinalist; (#R) rounds 4, 3, 2, 1; (RR) round-robin stage; (Q#) qualification round; (DNQ) did not qualify; (A) absent; (NH) not held; (SR) strike rate (events won / competed); (W–L) win–loss record.

Tournament	1979	1980	1981	1982	1983	1984	1985	1986	1987	1988	1989	Career SR
Australian Open	A	A	A	A	A	A	A	NH	A	A	1R	0 / 1
French Open	A	2R	3R	3R	QF	QF	3R	1R	1R	1R	A	0 / 9
Wimbledon	A	A	A	1R	A	2R	A	3R	1R	1R	A	0 / 5
US Open	2R	2R	3R	A	2R	1R	1R	3R	1R	A	A	0 / 8
SR	0 / 1	0 / 2	0 / 2	0 / 2	0 / 2	0 / 3	0 / 2	0 / 3	0 / 3	0 / 2	0 / 1	0 / 23
Year-end ranking	NR	NR	28	49	15	29	50	47	37	85	218	

Sporting positions
Preceded by (United States) Andrea Jaeger	Orange Bowl Girls' Singles Champion; Category: 18 and under 1979	Succeeded by (United States) Susan Mascarin
