= 1981 WTA Tour =

Women's tennis circuit

- Chris Evert-Lloyd finished the year as world No. 1 for the fifth time in her career. She won eight singles tournaments during the season, including a major at the Wimbledon Championships. She also finished runner-up at another major, the Australian Open.

Details
- Duration: 12 January – 20 December 1981
- Edition: 9th
- Tournaments: 47
- Categories: Grand Slam (4); WTA Championships (3); Avon Championships (10); Toyota Series (26)

Achievements (singles)
- Most titles: (United States) Martina Navratilova (10)
- Most finals: (United States) Martina Navratilova (16)
- Prize money leader: (United States) Martina Navratilova ($865,437)
- Points leader: (United States) Chris Evert (17.542)

Awards
- Player of the year: (United States) Chris Evert-Lloyd
- Doubles team of the year: (United States) Martina Navratilova (United States) Pam Shriver
- Most improved player of the year: (United States) Barbara Potter
- Newcomer of the year: (United States) Kathy Rinaldi

The 1981 World Championship Series was the 9th season since the foundation of the Women's Tennis Association. It commenced on January 4, 1981, and concluded on December 19, 1981, after 36 events. The World Championship Series was the elite tour for professional women's tennis organised by the Women's Tennis Association (WTA). The year is divided into two sponsors with the first three months sponsored by Avon Series and the latter part by Toyota Series. It included the four Grand Slam tournaments and a series of other events. ITF tournaments were not part of the tour, although they awarded points for the WTA World Ranking.

== Schedule ==
The table below shows the 1981 WTA Tour schedule.

Key

Grand Slam tournaments
WTA championships
Avon Championships Circuit
Toyota Series
Team events

=== January ===
Week	Tournament	Champions	Runners-up	Semifinalists	Quarterfinalists
12 Jan	Avon Championships of Kansas; Kansas City, United States; Avon Championships Circuit; Carpet (i) – $150,000 – 32S/16D; Singles	(United States) Andrea Jaeger; 3–6, 6–3, 7–5	(United States) Martina Navratilova	(United States) Barbara Potter (Romania) Virginia Ruzici	(United States) Kate Latham (United States) Sandy Collins (Socialist Federal Republic of Yugoslavia) Mima Jaušovec (West Germany) Sylvia Hanika
12 Jan	Avon Championships of Kansas; Kansas City, United States; Avon Championships Circuit; Carpet (i) – $150,000 – 32S/16D; Singles	(United States) Barbara Potter (United States) Sharon Walsh; 6–2, 7–6^{(7–4)}	(United States) Rosie Casals (Australia) Wendy Turnbull	(United States) Barbara Potter (Romania) Virginia Ruzici	(United States) Kate Latham (United States) Sandy Collins (Socialist Federal Republic of Yugoslavia) Mima Jaušovec (West Germany) Sylvia Hanika
19 Jan	Avon Championships of Cincinnati; Cincinnati, United States; Avon Championships Circuit; Carpet (i) – $150,000 – 32S/16D	(United States) Martina Navratilova; 6–2, 6–4	(West Germany) Sylvia Hanika	(United States) Jennifer Russell (Czechoslovakia) Hana Mandlíková	(United States) Barbara Potter (United States) Pam Shriver (Romania) Virginia Ruzici (United Kingdom) Virginia Wade
19 Jan	Avon Championships of Cincinnati; Cincinnati, United States; Avon Championships Circuit; Carpet (i) – $150,000 – 32S/16D	(United States) Kathy Jordan (United States) Anne Smith; 1–6, 6–3, 6–3	(United States) Martina Navratilova (United States) Pam Shriver	(United States) Jennifer Russell (Czechoslovakia) Hana Mandlíková	(United States) Barbara Potter (United States) Pam Shriver (Romania) Virginia Ruzici (United Kingdom) Virginia Wade
26 Jan	Avon Championships of Chicago; Chicago, United States; Avon Championships Circuit; Carpet (i) – $200,000 – 56S/28D	(United States) Martina Navratilova; 6–4, 6–2	(Czechoslovakia) Hana Mandlíková	(Australia) Wendy Turnbull (United States) Barbara Potter	(United States) Anne Smith (United States) Pam Shriver (United States) Peanut Louie (West Germany) Sylvia Hanika
26 Jan	Avon Championships of Chicago; Chicago, United States; Avon Championships Circuit; Carpet (i) – $200,000 – 56S/28D	(United States) Martina Navratilova (United States) Pam Shriver; 6–3, 6–1	(United States) Barbara Potter (United States) Sharon Walsh	(Australia) Wendy Turnbull (United States) Barbara Potter	(United States) Anne Smith (United States) Pam Shriver (United States) Peanut Louie (West Germany) Sylvia Hanika

=== February ===
Week	Tournament	Champions	Runners-up	Semifinalists	Quarterfinalists
2 Feb	Avon Championships of Detroit; Detroit, United States; Avon Championships Circuit; Carpet (i) – $150,000 – 32S/16D; Singles	(United States) Leslie Allen; 6–4, 6–4	(Czechoslovakia) Hana Mandlíková	(United States) Pam Shriver (United States) Barbara Potter	(West Germany) Claudia Kohde-Kilsch (West Germany) Bettina Bunge (Socialist Federal Republic of Yugoslavia) Mima Jaušovec (Australia) Wendy Turnbull
2 Feb	Avon Championships of Detroit; Detroit, United States; Avon Championships Circuit; Carpet (i) – $150,000 – 32S/16D; Singles	(United States) Rosie Casals (Australia) Wendy Turnbull; 6–4, 6–2	(Czechoslovakia) Hana Mandlíková (Netherlands) Betty Stöve	(United States) Pam Shriver (United States) Barbara Potter	(West Germany) Claudia Kohde-Kilsch (West Germany) Bettina Bunge (Socialist Federal Republic of Yugoslavia) Mima Jaušovec (Australia) Wendy Turnbull
9 Feb	Avon Championships of California; Oakland, United States; Avon Championships Circuit; Carpet (i) – $125,000 – 32S/16D; Singles	(United States) Andrea Jaeger; 6–3, 6–1	(United Kingdom) Virginia Wade	(United States) Beth Norton (Australia) Wendy Turnbull	(West Germany) Claudia Kohde-Kilsch (United States) Pam Teeguarden (Socialist Federal Republic of Yugoslavia) Mima Jaušovec (United Kingdom) Sue Barker
9 Feb	Avon Championships of California; Oakland, United States; Avon Championships Circuit; Carpet (i) – $125,000 – 32S/16D; Singles	(United States) Rosie Casals (Australia) Wendy Turnbull; 6–1, 6–4	(United States) Martina Navratilova (United Kingdom) Virginia Wade	(United States) Beth Norton (Australia) Wendy Turnbull	(West Germany) Claudia Kohde-Kilsch (United States) Pam Teeguarden (Socialist Federal Republic of Yugoslavia) Mima Jaušovec (United Kingdom) Sue Barker
16 Feb	Avon Championships of Houston; Houston, United States; Avon Championships Circuit; Carpet (i) – $100,000 – 16S/8D; Singles – Doubles	(Czechoslovakia) Hana Mandlíková; 6–4, 6–4	(West Germany) Bettina Bunge	(United States) Kathy Jordan (Socialist Federal Republic of Yugoslavia) Mima Jaušovec	(United States) Pam Teeguarden (United States) Zina Garrison (United States) Jennifer Russell (United States) Kate Latham
16 Feb	Avon Championships of Houston; Houston, United States; Avon Championships Circuit; Carpet (i) – $100,000 – 16S/8D; Singles – Doubles	(United Kingdom) Sue Barker (United States) Ann Kiyomura; 5–7, 6–4, 6–3	(Czechoslovakia) Regina Maršíková (United States) Mary Lou Piatek	(United States) Kathy Jordan (Socialist Federal Republic of Yugoslavia) Mima Jaušovec	(United States) Pam Teeguarden (United States) Zina Garrison (United States) Jennifer Russell (United States) Kate Latham
23 Feb	Avon Championships of Seattle; Seattle, United States; Avon Championships Circuit; Carpet (i) – $150,000 – 32S/16D	(West Germany) Sylvia Hanika; 6–2, 6–1	(United States) Barbara Potter	(United States) Kathy Jordan (West Germany) Bettina Bunge	(United States) Anne Smith (United States) Pam Shriver (Australia) Wendy Turnbull (Czechoslovakia) Hana Mandlíková
23 Feb	Avon Championships of Seattle; Seattle, United States; Avon Championships Circuit; Carpet (i) – $150,000 – 32S/16D	(United States) Rosie Casals (Australia) Wendy Turnbull; 6–1, 6–4	(United Kingdom) Sue Barker (United States) Ann Kiyomura	(United States) Kathy Jordan (West Germany) Bettina Bunge	(United States) Anne Smith (United States) Pam Shriver (Australia) Wendy Turnbull (Czechoslovakia) Hana Mandlíková

=== March ===
Week	Tournament	Champions	Runners-up	Semifinalists	Quarterfinalists
2 Mar	Avon Championships of Los Angeles; Los Angeles, United States; Avon Championships Circuit; Hard – $150,000 – 32S/16D	(United States) Martina Navratilova; 6–4, 6–0	(United States) Andrea Jaeger	(West Germany) Sylvia Hanika (West Germany) Bettina Bunge	(United States) Julie Harrington (United States) Barbara Potter (United States) JoAnne Russell (United States) Billie Jean King
2 Mar	Avon Championships of Los Angeles; Los Angeles, United States; Avon Championships Circuit; Hard – $150,000 – 32S/16D	(Australia) Susan Leo (United States) Kim Sands; 6–1, 4–6, 6–1	(United States) Peanut Louie (United States) Marita Redondo	(West Germany) Sylvia Hanika (West Germany) Bettina Bunge	(United States) Julie Harrington (United States) Barbara Potter (United States) JoAnne Russell (United States) Billie Jean King
9 Mar	Avon Championships of Dallas; Dallas, United States; Avon Championships Circuit; Carpet (i) – $175,000 – 33S/16D	(United States) Martina Navratilova; 6–2, 6–4	(United States) Pam Shriver	(Romania) Virginia Ruzici (West Germany) Bettina Bunge	(United States) Mary Lou Piatek (United States) Billie Jean King (United States) Kathy Jordan (Socialist Federal Republic of Yugoslavia) Mima Jaušovec
9 Mar	Avon Championships of Dallas; Dallas, United States; Avon Championships Circuit; Carpet (i) – $175,000 – 33S/16D	(United States) Martina Navratilova (United States) Pam Shriver; 7–5, 6–4	(United States) Kathy Jordan (United States) Anne Smith	(Romania) Virginia Ruzici (West Germany) Bettina Bunge	(United States) Mary Lou Piatek (United States) Billie Jean King (United States) Kathy Jordan (Socialist Federal Republic of Yugoslavia) Mima Jaušovec
15 Mar	Avon Championships of Boston; Boston, United States; Avon Championships Circuit; Carpet (i) – $150,000 – 32S/16D	(United States) Chris Evert-Lloyd; 6–4, 6–4	(Socialist Federal Republic of Yugoslavia) Mima Jaušovec	(United States) Kathy Jordan (West Germany) Sylvia Hanika	(Romania) Virginia Ruzici (United States) Peanut Louie (Australia) Wendy Turnbull (Czechoslovakia) Hana Mandlíková
15 Mar	Avon Championships of Boston; Boston, United States; Avon Championships Circuit; Carpet (i) – $150,000 – 32S/16D	(United States) Barbara Potter (United States) Sharon Walsh; 5–7, 6–4, 6–3	(United States) Jennifer Russell (Romania) Virginia Ruzici	(United States) Kathy Jordan (West Germany) Sylvia Hanika	(Romania) Virginia Ruzici (United States) Peanut Louie (Australia) Wendy Turnbull (Czechoslovakia) Hana Mandlíková
23 Mar	Avon Championships; New York City, United States; WTA Championships; Carpet (i) – $300,000 – 8S/4D; Singles – Doubles	(United States) Martina Navratilova; 6–3, 7–6^{(7–3)}	(United States) Andrea Jaeger	(West Germany) Bettina Bunge (West Germany) Sylvia Hanika	
23 Mar	Avon Championships; New York City, United States; WTA Championships; Carpet (i) – $300,000 – 8S/4D; Singles – Doubles	(United States) Martina Navratilova (United States) Pam Shriver; 6–0, 7–6^{(8–6)}	(United States) Barbara Potter (United States) Sharon Walsh	(West Germany) Bettina Bunge (West Germany) Sylvia Hanika	

=== April ===
Week	Tournament	Champions	Runners-up	Semifinalists	Quarterfinalists
6 Apr	Family Circle Cup; Hilton Head Island, United States; Toyota Series (Category 5); Clay – $150,000 – 56S/32D	(United States) Chris Evert-Lloyd; 6–3, 6–2	(United States) Pam Shriver	(Romania) Virginia Ruzici (United States) JoAnne Russell	(Czechoslovakia) Regina Maršíková (Socialist Federal Republic of Yugoslavia) Mima Jaušovec (United States) Pam Casale (United States) Joyce Portman
6 Apr	Family Circle Cup; Hilton Head Island, United States; Toyota Series (Category 5); Clay – $150,000 – 56S/32D	(United States) Rosie Casals (Australia) Wendy Turnbull; 7–5, 7–5	(Socialist Federal Republic of Yugoslavia) Mima Jaušovec (United States) Pam Shriver	(Romania) Virginia Ruzici (United States) JoAnne Russell	(Czechoslovakia) Regina Maršíková (Socialist Federal Republic of Yugoslavia) Mima Jaušovec (United States) Pam Casale (United States) Joyce Portman
13 Apr	Wightman Cup; Williamsburg, United States; Team event Hard (i)	United States; 7–0	Great Britain		
20 Apr	Murjani WTA Championships; Amelia Island, United States; Toyota Series (Category 7); Clay – $250,000 – 56S/32D; Singles – Doubles	(United States) Chris Evert-Lloyd; 6–0, 6–0	(United States) Martina Navratilova	(Romania) Virginia Ruzici (Socialist Federal Republic of Yugoslavia) Mima Jaušovec	(United States) Pam Shriver (United States) Andrea Jaeger (Argentina) Ivanna Madruga (West Germany) Sylvia Hanika
20 Apr	Murjani WTA Championships; Amelia Island, United States; Toyota Series (Category 7); Clay – $250,000 – 56S/32D; Singles – Doubles	(United States) Kathy Jordan (United States) Paula Smith; 6–3, 5–7, 7–6^{(7–2)}	(Romania) Virginia Ruzici (United States) JoAnne Russell	(Romania) Virginia Ruzici (Socialist Federal Republic of Yugoslavia) Mima Jaušovec	(United States) Pam Shriver (United States) Andrea Jaeger (Argentina) Ivanna Madruga (West Germany) Sylvia Hanika
27 Apr	United Airlines Tournament of Champions; Orlando, United States; Toyota Series (Category 7); Clay – $200,000 – 22S/8D	(United States) Martina Navratilova; 7–5, 6–3	(United States) Andrea Jaeger	(Czechoslovakia) Regina Maršíková (Czechoslovakia) Hana Mandlíková	(South Africa) Yvonne Vermaak (Australia) Wendy Turnbull (United States) Kathleen Horvath (West Germany) Sylvia Hanika
27 Apr	United Airlines Tournament of Champions; Orlando, United States; Toyota Series (Category 7); Clay – $200,000 – 22S/8D	(United States) Martina Navratilova (United States) Pam Shriver; 6–1, 7–6^{(12–10)}	(United States) Rosie Casals (Australia) Wendy Turnbull	(Czechoslovakia) Regina Maršíková (Czechoslovakia) Hana Mandlíková	(South Africa) Yvonne Vermaak (Australia) Wendy Turnbull (United States) Kathleen Horvath (West Germany) Sylvia Hanika

=== May ===
Week	Tournament	Champions	Runners-up	Semifinalists	Quarterfinalists
4 May	Italian Open; Perugia, Italy; Toyota Series (Category 3); Clay – $100,000 – 56S/32D	(United States) Chris Evert-Lloyd; 6–1, 6–2	(Romania) Virginia Ruzici	(United States) Sandy Collins (United States) Joyce Portman	(Romania) Lucia Romanov (South Africa) Rosalyn Fairbank (Argentina) Ivanna Madruga (Netherlands) Elly Appel-Vessies
4 May	Italian Open; Perugia, Italy; Toyota Series (Category 3); Clay – $100,000 – 56S/32D	(United States) Candy Reynolds (United States) Paula Smith; 7–5, 6–1	(United States) Chris Evert-Lloyd (Romania) Virginia Ruzici	(United States) Sandy Collins (United States) Joyce Portman	(Romania) Lucia Romanov (South Africa) Rosalyn Fairbank (Argentina) Ivanna Madruga (Netherlands) Elly Appel-Vessies
4 May	Bridgestone Doubles Championships; Tokyo, Japan; Toyota Series (Category 5); Carpet (i) – $150,000 – 8D	(United Kingdom) Sue Barker (United States) Ann Kiyomura; 7–5, 6–2	(United States) Barbara Potter (United States) Sharon Walsh	(United States) Casals / (Australia) Turnbull (United States) Jordan / (United States) Smith	(United States) Peanut Louie/ (United States) Redondo (Canada) Blackwood / (Australia) Leo (United States) duPont / (United States) Jordan (United States) Jaeger / (United States) King
11 May	Toyota Swiss Open; Lugano, Switzerland; Toyota Series (Category 3); Clay – $100,000 – 32S/16D	(United States) Chris Evert-Lloyd; 6–1, 6–1	(Romania) Virginia Ruzici	(Czechoslovakia) Regina Maršíková (West Germany) Sylvia Hanika	(United States) Sandy Collins (Australia) Dianne Balestrat (Switzerland) Hana Strachoňová (United States) Candy Reynolds
11 May	Toyota Swiss Open; Lugano, Switzerland; Toyota Series (Category 3); Clay – $100,000 – 32S/16D	(South Africa) Rosalyn Fairbank (South Africa) Tanya Harford; 2–6, 6–1, 6–4	(United States) Candy Reynolds (United States) Paula Smith	(Czechoslovakia) Regina Maršíková (West Germany) Sylvia Hanika	(United States) Sandy Collins (Australia) Dianne Balestrat (Switzerland) Hana Strachoňová (United States) Candy Reynolds
18 May	German Open; West Berlin, West Germany; Toyota Series (Category 3); Clay – $150,000 – 56S/28D	(Czechoslovakia) Regina Maršíková; 6–2, 6–1	(Argentina) Ivanna Madruga	(United States) Sandy Collins (Australia) Dianne Fromholtz	(United States) Tracy Austin (United Kingdom) Deborah Jevans (Socialist Federal Republic of Yugoslavia) Mima Jaušovec (Czechoslovakia) Hana Mandlíková
18 May	German Open; West Berlin, West Germany; Toyota Series (Category 3); Clay – $150,000 – 56S/28D	(South Africa) Rosalyn Fairbank (South Africa) Tanya Harford; 6–3, 6–4	(United Kingdom) Sue Barker (Czechoslovakia) Renáta Tomanová	(United States) Sandy Collins (Australia) Dianne Fromholtz	(United States) Tracy Austin (United Kingdom) Deborah Jevans (Socialist Federal Republic of Yugoslavia) Mima Jaušovec (Czechoslovakia) Hana Mandlíková
25 May; 1 June	French Open; Paris, France; Grand Slam; Clay – $300,000 – 112S/64Q/48D/32X; Singles – Doubles – Mixed doubles	(Czechoslovakia) Hana Mandlíková; 6–2, 6–4	(West Germany) Sylvia Hanika	(United States) Chris Evert-Lloyd (United States) Andrea Jaeger	(Romania) Virginia Ruzici (United States) Kathy Rinaldi (Socialist Federal Republic of Yugoslavia) Mima Jaušovec (United States) Martina Navratilova
25 May; 1 June	French Open; Paris, France; Grand Slam; Clay – $300,000 – 112S/64Q/48D/32X; Singles – Doubles – Mixed doubles	(South Africa) Rosalyn Fairbank (South Africa) Tanya Harford; 6–1, 6–3	(United States) Candy Reynolds (United States) Paula Smith	(United States) Chris Evert-Lloyd (United States) Andrea Jaeger	(Romania) Virginia Ruzici (United States) Kathy Rinaldi (Socialist Federal Republic of Yugoslavia) Mima Jaušovec (United States) Martina Navratilova
25 May; 1 June	French Open; Paris, France; Grand Slam; Clay – $300,000 – 112S/64Q/48D/32X; Singles – Doubles – Mixed doubles	(United States) Andrea Jaeger (United States) James Arias; 7–6, 6–4	(Netherlands) Betty Stöve (United States) Frederick McNair	(United States) Chris Evert-Lloyd (United States) Andrea Jaeger	(Romania) Virginia Ruzici (United States) Kathy Rinaldi (Socialist Federal Republic of Yugoslavia) Mima Jaušovec (United States) Martina Navratilova

=== June ===
Week	Tournament	Champions	Runners-up	Semifinalists	Quarterfinalists
8 Jun	Surrey Championships; Surbiton, Great Britain; Toyota Series (Category 1); Grass – $50,000 – 56S/32D	(United States) Betsy Nagelsen; 6–0, 6–4	(United States) Barbara Hallquist	(United States) Diane Desfor (United States) Martina Navratilova	(Canada) Marjorie Blackwood (United States) Laura duPont (United States) JoAnne Russell (United Kingdom) Sue Barker
8 Jun	Surrey Championships; Surbiton, Great Britain; Toyota Series (Category 1); Grass – $50,000 – 56S/32D	(United Kingdom) Sue Barker (United States) Ann Kiyomura; 6–1, 6–7, 6–1	(United States) Billie Jean King (South Africa) Ilana Kloss	(United States) Diane Desfor (United States) Martina Navratilova	(Canada) Marjorie Blackwood (United States) Laura duPont (United States) JoAnne Russell (United Kingdom) Sue Barker
15 Jun	BMW Championships; Eastbourne, Great Britain; Toyota Series (Category 4); Grass – $125,000 – 64S/32D	(United States) Tracy Austin; 6–3, 6–4	(United States) Andrea Jaeger	(United States) Barbara Potter (United States) Martina Navratilova	(United States) Anne Smith (Australia) Wendy Turnbull (United States) Pam Casale (West Germany) Claudia Kohde-Kilsch
15 Jun	BMW Championships; Eastbourne, Great Britain; Toyota Series (Category 4); Grass – $125,000 – 64S/32D	(United States) Martina Navratilova (United States) Pam Shriver; 6–7^{(5–7)}, 6–2, 6–1	(United States) Kathy Jordan (United States) Anne Smith	(United States) Barbara Potter (United States) Martina Navratilova	(United States) Anne Smith (Australia) Wendy Turnbull (United States) Pam Casale (West Germany) Claudia Kohde-Kilsch
22 Jun; 29 Jun	Wimbledon Championships; London, Great Britain; Grand Slam; Grass – $300,000 – 112S/64Q/48D/48X; Singles – Doubles – Mixed doubles	(United States) Chris Evert-Lloyd; 6–2, 6–2	(Czechoslovakia) Hana Mandlíková	(United States) Pam Shriver (United States) Martina Navratilova	(Socialist Federal Republic of Yugoslavia) Mima Jaušovec (United States) Tracy Austin (Romania) Virginia Ruzici (Australia) Wendy Turnbull
22 Jun; 29 Jun	Wimbledon Championships; London, Great Britain; Grand Slam; Grass – $300,000 – 112S/64Q/48D/48X; Singles – Doubles – Mixed doubles	(United States) Martina Navratilova (United States) Pam Shriver; 6–3, 7–6^{(8–6)}	(United States) Kathy Jordan (United States) Anne Smith	(United States) Pam Shriver (United States) Martina Navratilova	(Socialist Federal Republic of Yugoslavia) Mima Jaušovec (United States) Tracy Austin (Romania) Virginia Ruzici (Australia) Wendy Turnbull
22 Jun; 29 Jun	Wimbledon Championships; London, Great Britain; Grand Slam; Grass – $300,000 – 112S/64Q/48D/48X; Singles – Doubles – Mixed doubles	(Netherlands) Betty Stöve (South Africa) Frew McMillan; 4–6, 7–6^{(7–2)}, 6–3	(United States) Tracy Austin (United States) John Austin	(United States) Pam Shriver (United States) Martina Navratilova	(Socialist Federal Republic of Yugoslavia) Mima Jaušovec (United States) Tracy Austin (Romania) Virginia Ruzici (Australia) Wendy Turnbull

=== July ===
Week	Tournament	Champions	Runners-up	Semifinalists	Quarterfinalists
13 Jul	Austrian Open; Kitzbühel, Austria; Toyota Series (Category 1); Clay – $50,000 – 32S/16D	(West Germany) Claudia Kohde-Kilsch; 7–5, 7–6	(West Germany) Sylvia Hanika	(Czechoslovakia) Regina Maršíková (Romania) Virginia Ruzici	(Brazil) Patricia Medrado (South Africa) Yvonne Vermaak (Sweden) Lena Sandin (Canada) Marjorie Blackwood
13 Jul	Austrian Open; Kitzbühel, Austria; Toyota Series (Category 1); Clay – $50,000 – 32S/16D	(West Germany) Claudia Kohde-Kilsch (West Germany) Eva Pfaff; 6–4, 6–3	(Australia) Elizabeth Little (South Africa) Yvonne Vermaak	(Czechoslovakia) Regina Maršíková (Romania) Virginia Ruzici	(Brazil) Patricia Medrado (South Africa) Yvonne Vermaak (Sweden) Lena Sandin (Canada) Marjorie Blackwood
27 Jul	Wells Fargo Open; San Diego, United States; Toyota Series (Category 4); Hard – $125,000- 32S/16D	(United States) Tracy Austin; 6–2, 5–7, 6–2	(United States) Pam Shriver	(United States) Kathy Jordan (United States) Kate Latham	(United States) Candy Reynolds (United States) Mary Lou Piatek (West Germany) Bettina Bunge (South Africa) Yvonne Vermaak
27 Jul	Wells Fargo Open; San Diego, United States; Toyota Series (Category 4); Hard – $125,000- 32S/16D	(United States) Kathy Jordan (United States) Candy Reynolds; 6–1, 2–6, 6–4	(United States) Rosie Casals (United States) Pam Shriver	(United States) Kathy Jordan (United States) Kate Latham	(United States) Candy Reynolds (United States) Mary Lou Piatek (West Germany) Bettina Bunge (South Africa) Yvonne Vermaak

=== August ===
Week	Tournament	Champions	Runners-up	Semifinalists	Quarterfinalists
3 Aug	U.S. Clay Court Championships; Indianapolis, United States; Toyota Series (Category 5); Clay – $150,000 – 56S/32D; Singles – Doubles	(United States) Andrea Jaeger; 6–1, 6–0	(Romania) Virginia Ruzici	(Socialist Federal Republic of Yugoslavia) Mima Jaušovec (Czechoslovakia) Regina Maršíková	(United Kingdom) Sue Barker (United States) Anne Smith (Switzerland) Hana Strachoňová (United States) Susan Mascarin
3 Aug	U.S. Clay Court Championships; Indianapolis, United States; Toyota Series (Category 5); Clay – $150,000 – 56S/32D; Singles – Doubles	(United States) JoAnne Russell (Romania) Virginia Ruzici; 6–2, 6–2	(United Kingdom) Sue Barker (United States) Paula Smith	(Socialist Federal Republic of Yugoslavia) Mima Jaušovec (Czechoslovakia) Regina Maršíková	(United Kingdom) Sue Barker (United States) Anne Smith (Switzerland) Hana Strachoňová (United States) Susan Mascarin
10 Aug	Central Fidelity Banks International; Richmond, United States; Toyota Series (Category 3); Carpet (i) – $100,000 – 32S/16D	(United States) Mary Lou Piatek; 6–4, 6–1	(United Kingdom) Sue Barker	(United States) Betsy Nagelsen (United States) Pam Shriver	(West Germany) Sylvia Hanika (Czechoslovakia) Regina Maršíková (Australia) Wendy Turnbull (United States) Sandy Collins
10 Aug	Central Fidelity Banks International; Richmond, United States; Toyota Series (Category 3); Carpet (i) – $100,000 – 32S/16D	(United Kingdom) Sue Barker (United States) Ann Kiyomura; 4–6, 7–6, 6–4	(United States) Kathy Jordan (United States) Anne Smith	(United States) Betsy Nagelsen (United States) Pam Shriver	(West Germany) Sylvia Hanika (Czechoslovakia) Regina Maršíková (Australia) Wendy Turnbull (United States) Sandy Collins
17 Aug	Player's Canadian Open; Toronto, Canada; Toyota Series (Category 7); Hard – $200,000 – 56S/32D	(United States) Tracy Austin; 6–1, 6–4	(United States) Chris Evert-Lloyd	(United States) Andrea Jaeger (United States) Martina Navratilova	(Czechoslovakia) Hana Mandlíková (South Africa) Rosalyn Fairbank (West Germany) Sylvia Hanika (United States) Pam Shriver
17 Aug	Player's Canadian Open; Toronto, Canada; Toyota Series (Category 7); Hard – $200,000 – 56S/32D	(United States) Martina Navratilova (United States) Pam Shriver; 7–6, 7–6	(United States) Candy Reynolds (United States) Anne Smith	(United States) Andrea Jaeger (United States) Martina Navratilova	(Czechoslovakia) Hana Mandlíková (South Africa) Rosalyn Fairbank (West Germany) Sylvia Hanika (United States) Pam Shriver
24 Aug	Volvo Women's Cup; Mahwah, United States; Toyota Series (Category 3); Hard – $100,000 – 56S/32D	(Czechoslovakia) Hana Mandlíková; 6–2, 6–2	(United States) Pam Casale	(West Germany) Bettina Bunge (Czechoslovakia) Regina Maršíková	(United States) Trey Lewis (Romania) Virginia Ruzici (United States) Wendy White (United States) Stacy Margolin
24 Aug	Volvo Women's Cup; Mahwah, United States; Toyota Series (Category 3); Hard – $100,000 – 56S/32D	(United States) Rosie Casals (Australia) Wendy Turnbull; 6–2, 6–1	(United States) Candy Reynolds (Netherlands) Betty Stöve	(West Germany) Bettina Bunge (Czechoslovakia) Regina Maršíková	(United States) Trey Lewis (Romania) Virginia Ruzici (United States) Wendy White (United States) Stacy Margolin
31 Aug; 7 Sep	US Open; New York City, United States; Grand Slam; Hard – $400,000 – 128S/64Q/64D/32X; Singles – Doubles – Mixed doubles	(United States) Tracy Austin; 1–6, 7–6^{(7–4)}, 7–6^{(7–1)}	(United States) Martina Navratilova	(United States) Chris Evert-Lloyd (United States) Barbara Potter	(Czechoslovakia) Hana Mandlíková (United States) Anne Smith (West Germany) Sylvia Hanika (United States) Barbara Gerken
31 Aug; 7 Sep	US Open; New York City, United States; Grand Slam; Hard – $400,000 – 128S/64Q/64D/32X; Singles – Doubles – Mixed doubles	(United States) Kathy Jordan (United States) Anne Smith; 6–3, 6–3	(United States) Rosie Casals (Australia) Wendy Turnbull	(United States) Chris Evert-Lloyd (United States) Barbara Potter	(Czechoslovakia) Hana Mandlíková (United States) Anne Smith (West Germany) Sylvia Hanika (United States) Barbara Gerken
31 Aug; 7 Sep	US Open; New York City, United States; Grand Slam; Hard – $400,000 – 128S/64Q/64D/32X; Singles – Doubles – Mixed doubles	(United States) Anne Smith (South Africa) Kevin Curren; 6–4, 7–6^{(7–4)}	(United States) JoAnne Russell (United States) Steve Denton	(United States) Chris Evert-Lloyd (United States) Barbara Potter	(Czechoslovakia) Hana Mandlíková (United States) Anne Smith (West Germany) Sylvia Hanika (United States) Barbara Gerken

=== September ===
Week	Tournament	Champions	Runners-up	Semifinalists	Quarterfinalists
14 Sep	Toray Sillook Open; Tokyo, Japan; Toyota Series (Category 3); Carpet (i) – $100,000 – 32S	(United States) Ann Kiyomura; 6–4, 7–5	(West Germany) Bettina Bunge	(Socialist Federal Republic of Yugoslavia) Mima Jaušovec (United States) Kathleen Horvath	(United States) Sharon Walsh (United States) Candy Reynolds (United Kingdom) Anne Hobbs (United States) Leslie Allen
21 Sep	Toyota Tennis Classic; Atlanta, United States; Toyota Series (Category 2); Hard – $75,000 – 32S/16D	(United States) Tracy Austin; 4–6, 6–3, 6–3	(United States) Mary Lou Piatek	(United States) Laura duPont (United States) Susan Mascarin	(United States) Beth Norton (United States) Wendy White (United States) Rosie Casals (United States) Sharon Walsh
21 Sep	Toyota Tennis Classic; Atlanta, United States; Toyota Series (Category 2); Hard – $75,000 – 32S/16D	(United States) Laura duPont (United States) Betsy Nagelsen; 6–4, 7–5	(United States) Rosie Casals (United States) Candy Reynolds	(United States) Laura duPont (United States) Susan Mascarin	(United States) Beth Norton (United States) Wendy White (United States) Rosie Casals (United States) Sharon Walsh
28 Sep	U.S. Women's Indoor Championships; Bloomington, United States; Toyota Series (Category 4); Carpet (i) – $125,000 – 32S/16D	(United States) Martina Navratilova; 6–0, 6–2	(United States) Tracy Austin	(United States) Candy Reynolds (Australia) Wendy Turnbull	(United States) Sharon Walsh (United States) Julie Harrington (United States) Anne Smith (United States) Barbara Potter
28 Sep	U.S. Women's Indoor Championships; Bloomington, United States; Toyota Series (Category 4); Carpet (i) – $125,000 – 32S/16D	(United States) Martina Navratilova (United States) Pam Shriver; 6–3, 7–6	(United States) Rosie Casals (Australia) Wendy Turnbull	(United States) Candy Reynolds (Australia) Wendy Turnbull	(United States) Sharon Walsh (United States) Julie Harrington (United States) Anne Smith (United States) Barbara Potter

=== October ===
Week	Tournament	Champions	Runners-up	Semifinalists	Quarterfinalists
5 Oct	Florida Federal Open; Tampa, United States; Toyota Series (Category 4); Hard – $125,000 – 32S/16D	(United States) Martina Navratilova; 5–7, 6–2, 6–0	(West Germany) Bettina Bunge	(West Germany) Sylvia Hanika (United States) Mary Lou Piatek	(United States) Barbara Hallquist (United States) Kathy Rinaldi (Australia) Wendy Turnbull (United States) Sandy Collins
5 Oct	Florida Federal Open; Tampa, United States; Toyota Series (Category 4); Hard – $125,000 – 32S/16D	(United States) Rosie Casals (Australia) Wendy Turnbull; 6–3, 6–4	(United States) Martina Navratilova (Czechoslovakia) Renáta Tomanová	(West Germany) Sylvia Hanika (United States) Mary Lou Piatek	(United States) Barbara Hallquist (United States) Kathy Rinaldi (Australia) Wendy Turnbull (United States) Sandy Collins
12 Oct	Borden Classic; Tokyo, Japan; Toyota Series (Category 1); Hard – $50,000 – 32S/16D; Singles – Doubles	(United States) Kathy Rinaldi; 6–1, 7–5	(United States) Julie Harrington	(United States) Pam Casale (Brazil) Patricia Medrado	(United States) Dana Gilbert (United States) Barbara Jordan (United States) Susan Mascarin (United States) Beth Norton
12 Oct	Borden Classic; Tokyo, Japan; Toyota Series (Category 1); Hard – $50,000 – 32S/16D; Singles – Doubles	(Netherlands) Marianne van der Torre (Netherlands) Nanette Schutte; 6–2, 6–4	(Australia) Elizabeth Smylie (United States) Kim Steinmetz	(United States) Pam Casale (Brazil) Patricia Medrado	(United States) Dana Gilbert (United States) Barbara Jordan (United States) Susan Mascarin (United States) Beth Norton
12 Oct	Lynda Carter Maybelline Classic; Deerfield Beach, United States; Toyota Series (Category 4); Hard – $125,000 – 32S/16D	(United States) Chris Evert-Lloyd; 4–6, 6–3, 6–0	(United States) Andrea Jaeger	(United States) Pam Shriver (West Germany) Sylvia Hanika	(United States) Bobbie Gadusek (United States) Anne White (United States) Rosie Casals (United States) Anne Smith
12 Oct	Lynda Carter Maybelline Classic; Deerfield Beach, United States; Toyota Series (Category 4); Hard – $125,000 – 32S/16D	(United States) Mary Lou Piatek (United States) Wendy White; 6–1, 3–6, 7–5	(United States) Pam Shriver (United States) Paula Smith	(United States) Pam Shriver (West Germany) Sylvia Hanika	(United States) Bobbie Gadusek (United States) Anne White (United States) Rosie Casals (United States) Anne Smith
19 Oct	Daihatsu Challenge; Brighton, Great Britain; Toyota Series (Category 4); Carpet (i) – $125,000 – 32S/16D	(United Kingdom) Sue Barker; 4–6, 6–1, 6–1	(Socialist Federal Republic of Yugoslavia) Mima Jaušovec	(United States) Barbara Potter (United States) Anne Smith	(United States) Tracy Austin (West Germany) Claudia Kohde-Kilsch (United States) Pam Shriver (West Germany) Sylvia Hanika
19 Oct	Daihatsu Challenge; Brighton, Great Britain; Toyota Series (Category 4); Carpet (i) – $125,000 – 32S/16D	(United States) Barbara Potter (United States) Anne Smith; 6–7^{(1–7)}, 6–3, 6–4	(Socialist Federal Republic of Yugoslavia) Mima Jaušovec (United States) Pam Shriver	(United States) Barbara Potter (United States) Anne Smith	(United States) Tracy Austin (West Germany) Claudia Kohde-Kilsch (United States) Pam Shriver (West Germany) Sylvia Hanika
19 Oct	Japan Open; Tokyo, Japan; Toyota Series (Category 1); Hard – $50,000 – S/D	(West Germany) Marie Pinterová; 2–6, 6–4, 6–1	(United States) Pam Casale	(United States) Barbara Potter (Brazil) Patricia Medrado	(United States) Julie Harrington (Italy) Barbara Rossi (Netherlands) Marianne van der Torre (South Korea) Lee Duk-hee
19 Oct	Japan Open; Tokyo, Japan; Toyota Series (Category 1); Hard – $50,000 – S/D	(Brazil) Patricia Medrado (Brazil) Cláudia Monteiro; 6–3, 3–6, 6–2	(United States) Barbara Jordan (United States) Roberta McCallum	(United States) Barbara Potter (Brazil) Patricia Medrado	(United States) Julie Harrington (Italy) Barbara Rossi (Netherlands) Marianne van der Torre (South Korea) Lee Duk-hee
26 Oct	Porsche Tennis Grand Prix; Stuttgart, West Germany; Toyota Series (Category 4); Hard (i) – $125,000 – 32S/16D	(United States) Tracy Austin; 4–6, 6–3, 6–4	(United States) Martina Navratilova	(Romania) Virginia Ruzici (West Germany) Sylvia Hanika	(Socialist Federal Republic of Yugoslavia) Mima Jaušovec (United States) JoAnne Russell (United Kingdom) Jo Durie (United States) Anne Smith
26 Oct	Porsche Tennis Grand Prix; Stuttgart, West Germany; Toyota Series (Category 4); Hard (i) – $125,000 – 32S/16D	(Socialist Federal Republic of Yugoslavia) Mima Jaušovec (United States) Martina Navratilova; 6–4, 6–1	(United States) Barbara Potter (United States) Anne Smith	(Romania) Virginia Ruzici (West Germany) Sylvia Hanika	(Socialist Federal Republic of Yugoslavia) Mima Jaušovec (United States) JoAnne Russell (United Kingdom) Jo Durie (United States) Anne Smith

=== November ===
Week	Tournament	Champions	Runners-up	Semifinalists	Quarterfinalists
2 Nov	Seiko Classic; Hong Kong; Toyota Series (Category 1); Hard – $50,000 – 32S/16D	(Australia) Wendy Turnbull; 6–3, 6–4	(Italy) Sabina Simmonds	(Netherlands) Marianne van der Torre (Netherlands) Marcella Mesker	(United Kingdom) Anne Hobbs (Brazil) Patricia Medrado (United States) Leigh-Anne Thompson (South Korea) Lee Duk-hee
2 Nov	Seiko Classic; Hong Kong; Toyota Series (Category 1); Hard – $50,000 – 32S/16D	(United States) Ann Kiyomura (United States) Sharon Walsh; 6–3, 6–4	(United Kingdom) Anne Hobbs (Australia) Susan Leo	(Netherlands) Marianne van der Torre (Netherlands) Marcella Mesker	(United Kingdom) Anne Hobbs (Brazil) Patricia Medrado (United States) Leigh-Anne Thompson (South Korea) Lee Duk-hee
9 Nov	Federation Cup; Tokyo, Japan; Team event Clay	United States; 3–0	Great Britain	Switzerland; Australia	Romania; West Germany; Soviet Union; Netherlands
16 Nov	National Panasonic Classic; Perth, Australia; Toyota Series (Category 4); Grass – $125,000 – 56S/32D	(United States) Pam Shriver; 6–1, 7–6^{(7–4)}	(United States) Andrea Jaeger	(Socialist Federal Republic of Yugoslavia) Mima Jaušovec (United States) Ann Kiyomura	(United States) Leslie Allen (United States) Barbara Potter (United States) Jane Preyer (United States) Anne Smith
16 Nov	National Panasonic Classic; Perth, Australia; Toyota Series (Category 4); Grass – $125,000 – 56S/32D	(United States) Barbara Potter (United States) Sharon Walsh; 6–4, 6–2	(United States) Betsy Nagelsen (United States) Candy Reynolds	(Socialist Federal Republic of Yugoslavia) Mima Jaušovec (United States) Ann Kiyomura	(United States) Leslie Allen (United States) Barbara Potter (United States) Jane Preyer (United States) Anne Smith
23 Nov	NSW Building Society Open; Sydney, Australia; Toyota Series (Category 4); Grass – $125,000 – 56S/32D	(United States) Chris Evert-Lloyd; 6–4, 2–6, 6–1	(United States) Martina Navratilova	(West Germany) Bettina Bunge (Australia) Wendy Turnbull	(Australia) Evonne Goolagong Cawley (United States) Anne Smith (United States) Andrea Jaeger (United States) Barbara Potter
23 Nov	NSW Building Society Open; Sydney, Australia; Toyota Series (Category 4); Grass – $125,000 – 56S/32D	(United States) Martina Navratilova (United States) Pam Shriver; 6–7, 6–2, 6–4	(United States) Kathy Jordan (United States) Anne Smith	(West Germany) Bettina Bunge (Australia) Wendy Turnbull	(Australia) Evonne Goolagong Cawley (United States) Anne Smith (United States) Andrea Jaeger (United States) Barbara Potter
30 Nov; 7 Dec	Toyota Australian Open; Melbourne, Australia; Grand Slam; Grass – $200,000 – 64S/32Q/32D; Singles – Doubles	(United States) Martina Navratilova; 6–7^{(4–7)}, 6–4, 7–5	(United States) Chris Evert-Lloyd	(Australia) Wendy Turnbull (United States) Pam Shriver	(Czechoslovakia) Hana Mandlíková (United States) Andrea Jaeger (Australia) Evonne Goolagong Cawley (United States) Tracy Austin
30 Nov; 7 Dec	Toyota Australian Open; Melbourne, Australia; Grand Slam; Grass – $200,000 – 64S/32Q/32D; Singles – Doubles	(United States) Kathy Jordan (United States) Anne Smith; 6–2, 7–5	(United States) Martina Navratilova (United States) Pam Shriver	(Australia) Wendy Turnbull (United States) Pam Shriver	(Czechoslovakia) Hana Mandlíková (United States) Andrea Jaeger (Australia) Evonne Goolagong Cawley (United States) Tracy Austin

=== December ===
Week	Tournament	Champions	Runners-up	Semifinalists	Quarterfinalists
14 Dec	Toyota Series Championships; East Rutherford, United States; WTA championships Hard (i) – $300,000 – 12S/6D	(United States) Tracy Austin; 2–6, 6–4, 6–2	(United States) Martina Navratilova	(United States) Pam Shriver (United States) Chris Evert-Lloyd	Round robin (Socialist Federal Republic of Yugoslavia) Mima Jaušovec (United States) Andrea Jaeger (Czechoslovakia) Hana Mandlíková (United States) Tracy Austin
14 Dec	Toyota Series Championships; East Rutherford, United States; WTA championships Hard (i) – $300,000 – 12S/6D	(United States) Martina Navratilova (United States) Pam Shriver; 6–3, 6–4	(United States) Rosie Casals (Australia) Wendy Turnbull	(United States) Pam Shriver (United States) Chris Evert-Lloyd	Round robin (Socialist Federal Republic of Yugoslavia) Mima Jaušovec (United States) Andrea Jaeger (Czechoslovakia) Hana Mandlíková (United States) Tracy Austin

== Toyota Series ==
=== Points system ===
The 31 Toyota Series tournaments were divided into eight point categories. The highest points were allocated to the Grand Slam tournaments; French Open, the Wimbledon Championships, the US Open and the Australian Open. Points were allocated based on these categories and the finishing position of a player in a tournament. The points allocation, with doubles points listed in brackets, is as follows:

Category	Grand Slam $300,000+	7 $200,000+	6 $175,000+	5 $150,000+	4 $125,000+	3 $100,000+	2 $75,000+	1 $50,000+
Winner	250 (125)	200 (105)	175 (88)	150 (75)	125 (62)	100 (50)	75 (38)	50 (25)
Runner-up	200 (100)	160 (90)	140 (73)	120 (60)	95 (47)	70 (35)	50 (25)	30 (15)
Semifinalist	160 (80)	130 (70)	110 (57)	90 (45)	70 (35)	50 (25)	35 (17)	20 (10)
Quarterfinalist	120 (60)	100 (50)	80 (40)	60 (30)	40 (20)	25 (12)	20 (8)	10 (5)
Fourth round	80 (40)	65 (35)	50 (25)	35 (17)	25 (12)	15 (8)	10 (5)	5 (3)
Third round	40 (30)	30 (22)	25 (15)	20 (9)	15 (5)	5 (3)	3 (1)	– (–)
Second round	15 (10)	10 (8)	10 (5)	7 (2)	5 (–)	– (–)	– (–)	– (–)

== Rankings ==
Below are the 1981 WTA year-end rankings (December 31, 1981) in both singles and doubles competition:

Singles Year-end Ranking
No	Player Name	Points	1980	Change
1	Chris Evert (USA)	17.542	1	Steady
2	Tracy Austin (USA)	16.486	2	Steady
3	Martina Navratilova (USA)	15.710	3	Steady
4	Andrea Jaeger (USA)	13.107	7	▲3
5	Hana Mandlíková (TCH)	11.234	4	▼1
6	Sylvia Hanika (FRG)	9.620	14	▲8
7	Pam Shriver (USA)	9.594	9	▲2
8	Wendy Turnbull (AUS)	8.262	8	Steady
9	Bettina Bunge (FRG)	7.932	19	▲10
10	Barbara Potter (USA)	7.921	25	▲15
11	Mima Jaušovec (YUG)	7.823	17	▲6
12	Virginia Ruzici (ROU)	7.399	11	▼1
13	Regina Maršíková (TCH)	6.567	18	▲5
14	Sue Barker (GBR)	6.405	16	▲2
15	Kathy Jordan (USA)	5.957	13	▼2
16	Anne Smith (USA)	5.728	24	▲8
17	Mary Lou Piatek (USA)	5.199	23	▲6
18	Sandy Collins (USA)	5.050	36	▲18
19	Leslie Allen (USA)	5.034	54	▲35
20	Claudia Kohde-Kilsch (FRG)	4.846	78	▲58

== See also ==
- 1981 Volvo Grand Prix
- Women's Tennis Association
- International Tennis Federation
