= 1981 Borden Classic – Singles =

Singles
- 1981 Borden Classic

Final
- Champion: (United States) Kathy Rinaldi
- Runner-up: (United States) Julie Harrington
- Score: 6–1, 7–5

Details
- Draw: 32
- Seeds: 8

Events
Singles	Doubles
← 1980 ·	Borden Classic	· 1982 →

Dana Gilbert was the defending champion, but lost in the quarterfinals to Pam Casale.

Kathy Rinaldi won the title by defeating Julie Harrington 6–1, 7–5 in the final.

== Seeds ==
1. (United States) Pam Casale (semifinals)
2. (United States) Beth Norton (quarterfinals)
3. (United States) Kathy Rinaldi (champion)
4. (United States) Susan Mascarin (quarterfinals)
5. (United States) Julie Harrington (final)
6. (Hungary) Marie Pinterová (second round)
7. (South Korea) Lee Duk-hee (first round)
8. (United States) Barbara Jordan (quarterfinals)

== Draw ==
=== Key ===
- Q = Qualifier
- WC = Wild card
- LL = Lucky loser
- Alt = Alternate
- ITF = ITF entry
- PR = Protected ranking
- SR = Special ranking
- SE = Special exempt
- JE = Junior exempt
- JR = Junior Accelerator Programme entrant
- CO = College Accelerator Programme entrant
- NG = Next Gen Accelerator Program entrant
- w/o = Walkover
- r = Retired
- d = Defaulted

=== Finals ===
Semifinals
1	(United States) Pam Casale	6	3	1
3	(United States) Kathy Rinaldi	3	6	6
5	(United States) Julie Harrington	4	6	6
(Brazil) Patricia Medrado	6	3	2

Final
3	(United States) Kathy Rinaldi	6	7
5	(United States) Julie Harrington	1	5

=== Top half ===
First round
1	(United States) P Casale	6	6
(Japan) N Sato	1	4
(United States) M Louie	7	7
(Canada) A Walker	5	6
(Netherlands) M van der Torre	4	6	5
(United States) D Gilbert	6	2	7
(Japan) M Yanagi	1	6	4
6	(Hungary) M Pinterová	6	4	6
3	(United States) K Rinaldi	6	6
(United States) R McCallum	4	3
(Netherlands) N Schutte	6	6
(Japan) F Furuhashi	1	0
(Japan) S Yonezawa	3	6	5
(United States) Shelby Torrance	6	3	7
(Mexico) S Rojas	4	4
8	(United States) B Jordan	6	6

Second round
1	(United States) P Casale	6	6
(United States) M Louie	4	4
(United States) D Gilbert	5	6	6
6	(Hungary) M Pinterová	7	2	2
3	(United States) K Rinaldi	6	6
(Netherlands) N Schutte	2	0
(United States) S Torrance	1	3
8	(United States) B Jordan	6	6

Quarterfinals
1	(United States) P Casale	5	6	6
(United States) D Gilbert	7	2	1
3	(United States) K Rinaldi	6	6
8	(United States) B Jordan	1	2

Semifinals
1	(United States) P Casale	6	3	1
3	(United States) K Rinaldi	3	6	6

=== Bottom half ===
First round
5	(United States) J Harrington	5	6	6
(Japan) K Okamoto	7	0	3
(United States) K Steinmetz	6	6
(Australia) Andrea Galloway	0	4
(United Kingdom) K Glancy	4	3
(Italy) B Rossi	6	6
(Brazil) C Monteiro	3	5
4	(United States) S Mascarin	6	7
7	(South Korea) D-h Lee	4	6	2
(Australia) N Gregory	6	3	6
(Brazil) P Medrado	6	6
(China) N Hu	2	4
(Japan) Kunio Tsukamoto	1	1
(United States) L duPont	6	6
(Australia) E Smylie	1	4
2	(United States) B Norton	6	6

Second round
5	(United States) J Harrington	5	6	6
(United States) K Steinmetz	7	0	3
(Italy) B Rossi	2	3
4	(United States) S Mascarin	6	6
(Australia) N Gregory	1	4
(Brazil) P Medrado	6	6
(United States) L duPont	2	6
2	(United States) B Norton	6	7

Quarterfinals
5	(United States) J Harrington	7	7
4	(United States) S Mascarin	6	6
(Brazil) P Medrado	6	6
2	(United States) B Norton	2	4

Semifinals
5	(United States) J Harrington	4	6	6
(Brazil) P Medrado	6	3	2
