= 1981 Borden Classic – Doubles =

Doubles
- 1981 Borden Classic

Final
- Champions: (Netherlands) Marianne van der Torre (Netherlands) Nanette Schutte
- Runners-up: (Australia) Elizabeth Smylie (United States) Kim Steinmetz
- Score: 6–2, 6–4

Details
- Draw: 16
- Seeds: 4

Events
Singles	Doubles
← 1980 ·	Borden Classic	· 1982 →

Lindsay Morse and Jean Nachand were the defending champions, but none competed this year.

Marianne van der Torre and Nanette Schutte won the title by defeating Elizabeth Smylie and Kim Steinmetz 6–2, 6–4 in the final.

== Seeds ==
1. (United States) Barbara Jordan / (United States) Roberta McCallum (semifinals)
2. (Brazil) Cláudia Monteiro / (Brazil) Patricia Medrado (first round)
3. (Japan) Naoko Sato / (United States) Beth Norton (first round)
4. (Hungary) Marie Pinterová / (Australia) Nerida Gregory (first round)

== Draw ==
=== Key ===
- Q = Qualifier
- WC = Wild card
- LL = Lucky loser
- Alt = Alternate
- ITF = ITF entry
- PR = Protected ranking
- SR = Special ranking
- SE = Special exempt
- JE = Junior exempt
- JR = Junior Accelerator Programme entrant
- CO = College Accelerator Programme entrant
- NG = Next Gen Accelerator Program entrant
- w/o = Walkover
- r = Retired
- d = Defaulted

=== Draw ===
First round
1	(United States) B Jordan (United States) R McCallum	6	6
(United States) D Gilbert (United Kingdom) J Louis	2	2
(United States) J Harrington (South Korea) D-h Lee	6	6
(Canada) K Dewis (Australia) J Walker	1	0
(Australia) E Smylie (United States) K Steinmetz	6	7
(Japan) K Okamoto (Japan) S Yonezawa	4	5
(United States) P Casale (United States) K Rinaldi	7	6
3	(Japan) N Sato (United States) B Norton	6	2
4	(Hungary) M Pinterová (Australia) N Gregory	6	6
(China) L Yu (China) Wang Ting	7	7
(Netherlands) M van der Torre (Netherlands) N Schutte	7	6
(Japan) K Fukuoka (Japan) Michiko Saji	5	3
(Japan) M Yanagi (Japan) F Furuhashi	4	6	6
(Japan) Kiyomi Nakagawa (Japan) Kumiyo Tsukamoto	6	2	2
(United States) L duPont (United States) S Mascarin	6	2	7
2	(Brazil) C Monteiro (Brazil) P Medrado	4	6	5

Quarterfinals
1	(United States) B Jordan (United States) R McCallum	6	6
(United States) J Harrington (South Korea) D-h Lee	3	2
(Australia) E Smylie (United States) K Steinmetz	6	5	7
(United States) P Casale (United States) K Rinaldi	4	7	5
(China) L Yu (China) T Wang	2	4
(Netherlands) M van der Torre (Netherlands) N Schutte	6	6
(Japan) M Yanagi (Japan) F Furuhashi	6	7
(United States) L duPont (United States) S Mascarin	4	5

Semifinals
1	(United States) B Jordan (United States) R McCallum	7	5	2
(Australia) E Smylie (United States) K Steinmetz	6	7	6
(Netherlands) M van der Torre (Netherlands) N Schutte	6	7
(Japan) M Yanagi (Japan) F Furuhashi	4	5

Final
(Australia) E Smylie (United States) K Steinmetz	2	4
(Netherlands) M van der Torre (Netherlands) N Schutte	6	6
