= 1981 Borden Classic =

- Date: 12–18 October 1981
- Edition: 3rd
- Category: Toyota Series (Category 1)
- Draw: 32S / 16D
- Prize money: $50,000
- Surface: Hard / outdoor
- Location: Tokyo, Japan

Champions

Singles
- (United States) Kathy Rinaldi

Doubles
- (Netherlands) Marianne van der Torre / (Netherlands) Nanette Schutte
- Borden Classic

The 1981 Borden Classic was a women's tennis tournament played on outdoor hardcourts in Tokyo, Japan. The event was part of the Category 1 (Note: Tournaments with prize money for the women of at least $50,000.) of the 1981 Toyota Series. It was the third edition of the tournament and was held from 12 October through 18 October 1981. Third -seeded Kathy Rinaldi won the singles title.

== Finals ==
=== Singles ===
(United States) Kathy Rinaldi defeated (United States) Julie Harrington 6–1, 7–5

- It was Rinaldi's only singles title of the year and the 1st of her career.

=== Doubles ===
(Netherlands) Marianne van der Torre / (Netherlands) Nanette Schutte defeated (Australia) Elizabeth Smylie / (United States) Kim Steinmetz 6–2, 6–4

- It was Van der Torre's only doubles title of her career. It was Schutte's only doubles title of her career.
