= 1979 Borden Classic =

- Date: 15–21 October
- Edition: 1st
- Category: Colgate Series (Category A)
- Draw: 32S / 16D
- Prize money: $35,000
- Surface: Hard / outdoor
- Location: Kyoto, Japan

Champions

Singles
- (United States) Betsy Nagelsen

Doubles
- (China) Chen Chuan / (China) Yu Li-Qiao
Borden Classic	· 1980 →

The 1979 Borden Classic was a women's tennis tournament played on outdoor hardcourts in Kyoto, Japan. The event was part of the Category A (Note: Tournaments with prize money for the women of at least $35,000.) of the 1979 Colgate Series. It was the inaugural edition of the tournament and was held from 15 October through 21 October 1979. First-seeded Betsy Nagelsen won the singles title.

== Finals ==
=== Singles ===
(United States) Betsy Nagelsen defeated (Japan) Naoko Sato 6–3, 6–4

- It was Nagelsen's only singles title of the year and the 2nd and last of her career.

=== Doubles ===
(China) Chen Chuan / (China) Yu Li-Qiao defeated (Australia) Sue Saliba / (Australia) Mary Sawyer 6–0, 7–6

- It was Chuan's only doubles title of her career. It was Li-Qiao's only doubles title of her career.
