= 1980 Borden Classic =

- Date: 13–19 October
- Edition: 2nd
- Category: Colgate Series (Category A)
- Draw: 32S / 16D
- Prize money: $50,000
- Surface: Hard / outdoor
- Location: Nagoya, Japan

Champions

Singles
- (United States) Dana Gilbert

Doubles
- (United States) Lindsay Morse / (United States) Jean Nachand
| ← 1979 · | Borden Classic | · 1981 → |

The 1980 Borden Classic was a women's tennis tournament played on outdoor hardcourts in Nagoya, Japan. The event was part of the Category A (Note: Tournaments with prize money for the women of at least $50,000.) of the 1980 Colgate Series. It was the second edition of the tournament and was held from 13 October through 19 October 1980. Unseeded Dana Gilbert won the singles title.

== Finals ==
=== Singles ===
(United States) Dana Gilbert defeated (United States) Barbara Jordan 5-1 ret

- It was Gilbert's only singles title of the year and the 2nd and last of her career.

=== Doubles ===
(United States) Lindsay Morse / (United States) Jean Nachand defeated (Australia) Nerida Gregory / (Hungary) Marie Pinterová 6–3, 6–1

- It was Morse's only doubles title of her career. It was Nachand's only doubles title of her career.
