= Borden Classic (tennis) =

Defunct tennis tournament
- Tour: WTA Tour
- Founded: 1979
- Abolished: 1984
- Editions: 6
- Location: Kyoto, Japan (1979); Nagoya, Japan (1980); Tokyo, Japan (1981–1984)
- Surface: Carpet; Hard

The Borden Classic is a defunct WTA Tour affiliated tennis tournament played from 1979 to 1984. It was held in three Japanese cities, namely Kyoto in 1979, Nagoya in 1980 and Tokyo from 1981 until 1984. The tournament was played on outdoor clay courts and hardcourts. Lisa Bonder won the singles title in 1982 and 1983, making her the only multiple winner in singles.

== Past finals ==
=== Singles ===
Year	Champions	Runners-up	Score
1979	(United States) Betsy Nagelsen	(Japan) Naoko Sato	6–3, 6–4
1980	(United States) Dana Gilbert	(United States) Barbara Jordan	6–3, 6–0
1981	(United States) Kathy Rinaldi	(United States) Julie Harrington	6–1, 7–5
1982	(United States) Lisa Bonder	(United States) Shelley Solomon	2–6, 6–0, 6–3
1983	(United States) Lisa Bonder	(Peru) Laura Arraya	6–1, 6–3
1984	(Japan) Etsuko Inoue	(United States) Beth Herr	6–0, 6–0

=== Doubles ===
Year	Champions	Runners-up	Score
1979	(China) Chen Chuan (China) Yu Li-Qiao	(Australia) Sue Saliba (Australia) Mary Sawyer	7–6, 3–6, 7–5
1980	(United States) Lindsay Morse (United States) Jean Nachand	(Australia) Nerida Gregory (Hungary) Marie Pinterová	6–3, 6–1
1981	(Netherlands) Marianne van der Torre (Netherlands) Nanette Schutte	(Australia) Elizabeth Smylie (United States) Kim Steinmetz	6–2, 6–4
1982	(Australia) Brenda Remilton (Japan) Naoko Sato	(United States) Laura duPont (United States) Barbara Jordan	6–3, 6–3
1983	(Australia) Chris O'Neil (Australia) Pam Whytcross	(Australia) Brenda Remilton (Japan) Naoko Satō	5–7, 7–6, 6–3
1984	(Argentina) Mercedes Paz (United States) Ronni Reis	(Argentina) Emilse Raponi-Longo (Argentina) Adriana Villagrán-Reami	6–4, 7–5
