= 1981 Avon Championships of Houston – Doubles =

Doubles
- 1981 Avon Championships of Houston

Final
- Champions: (United Kingdom) Sue Barker (United States) Ann Kiyomura
- Runners-up: (Czechoslovakia) Regina Maršíková (United States) Mary Lou Piatek
- Score: 5–7, 6–4, 6–3

Details
- Draw: 8 (1Alt)
- Seeds: 2

Events
Singles	Doubles
- Virginia Slims of Houston

Billie Jean King and Ilana Kloss were the defending champions, but none competed this year.

Sue Barker and Ann Kiyomura won the title by defeating Regina Maršíková and Mary Lou Piatek 5–7, 6–4, 6–3 in the final.

== Seeds ==
1. (n/a)
2. (Czechoslovakia) Hana Mandlíková / (Netherlands) Betty Stöve (first round)

== Draw ==
Key

- Q = Qualifier
- WC = Wild card
- LL = Lucky loser
- Alt = Alternate
- ITF = ITF entry
- PR = Protected ranking
- SR = Special ranking
- SE = Special exempt
- JE = Junior exempt
- JR = Junior Accelerator Programme entrant
- CO = College Accelerator Programme entrant
- NG = Next Gen Accelerator Program entrant
- w/o = Walkover
- r = Retired
- d = Defaulted

=== Draw ===
First round
Alt	(West Germany) Heidi Eisterlehner (Netherlands) Marianne van der Torre	1	3
(Socialist Federal Republic of Yugoslavia) Mima Jaušovec (United States) JoAnne Russell	6	6
(United States) Betsy Nagelsen (United Kingdom) Virginia Wade	1	7	6
(Czechoslovakia) Regina Maršíková (United States) Mary Lou Piatek	6	5	7
(West Germany) Bettina Bunge (United States) Pam Teeguarden	6	6
(United States) Renee Blount (United States) Kate Latham	4	3
(United Kingdom) Sue Barker (United States) Ann Kiyomura	6	6
2	(Czechoslovakia) Hana Mandlíková (Netherlands) Betty Stöve	3	1

Semifinals
(Socialist Federal Republic of Yugoslavia) Mima Jaušovec (United States) JoAnne Russell	0	4
(Czechoslovakia) Regina Maršíková (United States) Mary Lou Piatek	6	6
(West Germany) Bettina Bunge (United States) Pam Teeguarden	3	1
(United Kingdom) Sue Barker (United States) Ann Kiyomura	6	6

Final
(Czechoslovakia) Regina Maršíková (United States) Mary Lou Piatek	7	4	3
(United Kingdom) Sue Barker (United States) Ann Kiyomura	5	6	6
