= 1981 New South Wales Open =

- Date: 23–29 November 1981 (W); 14–20 December 1981 (M)
- Edition: 89th
- Category: Grand Prix (M); Colgate Series (W)
- Draw: 64S / 32D
- Prize money: $125,000
- Surface: Grass / outdoor
- Location: Sydney, Australia
- Venue: White City Stadium

Champions

Men's singles
- (United States) Tim Wilkison

Women's singles
- (United States) Chris Evert-Lloyd

Men's doubles
- (Australia) Peter McNamara / (Australia) Paul McNamee

Women's doubles
- (United States) Martina Navratilova / (United States) Pam Shriver
← 1980 ·	New South Wales Open	· 1982 →

The 1981 New South Wales Open was a combined men's and women's tennis tournament played on outdoor grass courts at the White City Stadium in Sydney, Australia. The men's event, also known by its sponsored name Nabisco NSW Championship, was part of the 1981 Volvo Grand Prix circuitand was held from 14 December through 20 December 1981. The women's event, also known by its sponsored name NSW Building Society Open, was part of the 1981 Colgate Series and was held from 23 November through 29 November 1981. It was the 89th edition of the event. The singles titles were won by unseeded Tim Wilkison and first-seeded Chris Evert-Lloyd.

== Finals ==
=== Men's singles ===
(United States) Tim Wilkison defeated (United States) Chris Lewis 6–4, 7–6, 6–3

=== Women's singles ===
(United States) Chris Evert-Lloyd defeated (United States) Martina Navratilova 6–4, 2–6, 6–1

=== Men's doubles ===
(Australia) Peter McNamara / (Australia) Paul McNamee defeated (United States) Hank Pfister / (United States) John Sadri 6–7, 7–6, 7–6

=== Women's doubles ===
(United States) Martina Navratilova / (United States) Pam Shriver defeated (United States) Kathy Jordan / (United States) Anne Smith 6–7, 6–2, 6–4
