= 1981 Avon Championships of California =

- Date: February 9–15
- Edition: 10th
- Category: Virginia Slims circuit
- Draw: 32S / 16D
- Prize money: $125,000
- Surface: Carpet (Sporteze) / indoor
- Location: Oakland, California, US
- Venue: Oakland Coliseum Arena

Champions

Singles
- (United States) Andrea Jaeger

Doubles
- (United States) Rosemary Casals / (Australia) Wendy Turnbull
← 1980 ·	Stanford Classic	· 1982 →

The 1981 Avon Championships of California, also known as the Avon Championships of Oakland, was a women's tennis tournament played on indoor carpet court at the Oakland Coliseum Arena in Oakland, California in the United States that was part of the 1981 Avon Championships Circuit. It was the 10th edition of the tournament and was held from February 9 through February 15, 1981. Second-seeded Andrea Jaeger won the singles title and earned $24,000 first-prize money.

== Finals ==
=== Singles ===
(United States) Andrea Jaeger defeated (United Kingdom) Virginia Wade 6–3, 6–1

- It was Jeager's 2nd singles title of the year and the 6th of her career.

=== Doubles ===
(United States) Rosemary Casals / (Australia) Wendy Turnbull defeated (United States) Martina Navratilova / (United Kingdom) Virginia Wade 6–1, 6–4

== Prize money ==
Event	W	F	SF	QF	Round of 16	Round of 32	Prel. round
Singles	$24,000	$12,000	$6,000	$3,000	$1,600	$900	$500
