= 1990 Virginia Slims Championships – Doubles =

Doubles
- 1990 Virginia Slims Championships

Final
- Champions: (United States) Kathy Jordan (Australia) Elizabeth Smylie
- Runners-up: (Argentina) Mercedes Paz (Spain) Arantxa Sánchez Vicario
- Score: 7–6^{(7–4)}, 6–4

Details
- Draw: 8
- Seeds: 4

Events
Singles	Doubles
- WTA Finals

Kathy Jordan and Elizabeth Smylie defeated Mercedes Paz and Arantxa Sánchez Vicario in the final, 7–6^{(7–4)}, 6–4 to win the doubles tennis title at the 1990 Virginia Slims Championships.

Martina Navratilova and Pam Shriver were the four-time defending champions, but withdrew due to a knee surgery to Navratilova.

== Seeds ==
1. (Czechoslovakia) Jana Novotná / (Czechoslovakia) Helena Suková (quarterfinals)
2. (Soviet Union) Larisa Savchenko / (Soviet Union) Natasha Zvereva (quarterfinals)
3. (United States) Kathy Jordan / (Australia) Elizabeth Smylie (champions)
4. (Argentina) Mercedes Paz / (Spain) Arantxa Sánchez Vicario (final)

== Draw ==
Key

- Q = Qualifier
- WC = Wild card
- LL = Lucky loser
- Alt = Alternate
- ITF = ITF entry
- PR = Protected ranking
- SR = Special ranking
- SE = Special exempt
- JE = Junior exempt
- JR = Junior Accelerator Programme entrant
- CO = College Accelerator Programme entrant
- NG = Next Gen Accelerator Program entrant
- w/o = Walkover
- r = Retired
- d = Defaulted

=== Draw ===
Quarterfinals
1	(Czechoslovakia) Jana Novotná (Czechoslovakia) Helena Suková	4	6	3
(Soviet Union) Natalia Medvedeva (Soviet Union) Leila Meskhi	6	1	6
4	(Argentina) Mercedes Paz (Spain) Arantxa Sánchez Vicario	6	6
(South Africa) Lise Gregory (United States) Gretchen Rush	3	4
(Australia) Nicole Provis (South Africa) Elna Reinach	1	6^{6}
3	(United States) Kathy Jordan (Australia) Elizabeth Smylie	6	7^{8}
(United States) Katrina Adams (United States) Lori McNeil	7	3	7^{7}
2	(Soviet Union) Larisa Savchenko (Soviet Union) Natasha Zvereva	5	6	6^{1}

Semifinals
(Soviet Union) Natalia Medvedeva (Soviet Union) Leila Meskhi	5	6	6^{5}
4	(Argentina) Mercedes Paz (Spain) Arantxa Sánchez Vicario	7	4	7^{7}
3	(United States) Kathy Jordan (Australia) Elizabeth Smylie	6	6
(United States) Katrina Adams (United States) Lori McNeil	1	4

Final
4	(Argentina) Mercedes Paz (Spain) Arantxa Sánchez Vicario	6^{4}	4
3	(United States) Kathy Jordan (Australia) Elizabeth Smylie	7^{7}	6
