= 1981 Avon Championships of Chicago =

- Date: January 26 – February 1
- Edition: 10th
- Category: Virginia Slims circuit
- Draw: 56S / 32D
- Prize money: $200,000
- Surface: Carpet (Sporteze) / indoor
- Location: Chicago, Illinois, US
- Venue: International Amphitheatre

Champions

Singles
- (United States) Martina Navratilova

Doubles
- (United States) Martina Navratilova / (United States) Pam Shriver
- Virginia Slims of Chicago

The 1981 Avon Championships of Chicago was a women's tennis tournament played on indoor carpet courts at the International Amphitheatre in Chicago, Illinois in the United States that was part of the 1981 Avon Championships Circuit. It was the 10th edition of the tournament and was held from January 26 through February 1, 1981. First-seeded Martina Navratilova won the singles title and earned $35,000 first-prize money.

== Finals ==
=== Singles ===
(United States) Martina Navratilova defeated (Czechoslovakia) Hana Mandlíková 6–4, 6–2

- It was Navratilova's 2nd singles title of the year and the 47th of her career.

=== Doubles ===
(United States) Martina Navratilova / (United States) Pam Shriver defeated (United States) Barbara Potter / (United States) Sharon Walsh 6–3, 6–1

== Prize money ==
Event	W	F	SF	QF	Round of 16	Round of 32	Round of 64
Singles	$35,000	$17,000	$8,900	$4,250	$2,300	$1,200	$650
