= 1981 Avon Championships of Houston – Singles =

Singles
- 1981 Avon Championships of Houston

Final
- Champion: (Czechoslovakia) Hana Mandlíková
- Runner-up: (West Germany) Bettina Bunge
- Score: 6–4, 6–4

Details
- Draw: 16
- Seeds: 4

Events
| Singles | Doubles |
- Virginia Slims of Houston

Billie Jean King was the defending champion.

Second-seeded Hana Mandlíková won the title, defeating unseeded Bettina Bunge in the final 6–4, 6–4.

== Seeds ==
A champion seed is indicated in bold text while text in italics indicates the round in which that seed was eliminated.

1. (United States) Tracy Austin (withdrew)
2. (Czechoslovakia) **Hana Mandlíková (champion)**
3. (United States) Barbara Jordan (semifinals)
4. (Socialist Federal Republic of Yugoslavia) Mima Jaušovec (semifinals)

== Draw ==
Key

- Q = Qualifier
- WC = Wild card
- LL = Lucky loser
- Alt = Alternate
- ITF = ITF entry
- PR = Protected ranking
- SR = Special ranking
- SE = Special exempt
- JE = Junior exempt
- JR = Junior Accelerator Programme entrant
- CO = College Accelerator Programme entrant
- NG = Next Gen Accelerator Program entrant
- w/o = Walkover
- r = Retired
- d = Defaulted

=== Final ===
First round
(United States) **Pam Teeguarden** | **6** | **6**
(West Germany) Heidi Eisterlehner | 1 | 3
(Netherlands) Betty Stöve | 6 | 3
(West Germany) **Bettina Bunge** | **7** | **6**
3 | (United States) **Kathy Jordan** | **6** | 3 | **6**
(United States) Betsy Nagelsen | 4 | **6** | 1
(United States) **Zina Garrison** | **6** | 1 | **6**
(Netherlands) Marianne van der Torre | 4 | **6** | 1
(United Kingdom) Virginia Wade | **7** | 4 | 0r
(United States) **Joanne Russell** | 5 | **6** | **2**
(United Kingdom) Sue Barker | **7** | 0 | 4
4 | (Socialist Federal Republic of Yugoslavia) **Mima Jaušovec** | 6 | **6** | **6**
(United States) **Kate Latham** | **6** | **6**
(United States) Renee Blount | 4 | 0
(United States) Mary Lou Daniels | **6** | 5 | 2
2 | (Czechoslovakia) **Hana Mandlíková** | 3 | **7** | **6**

Quarterfinals
(United States) Pam Teeguarden | **6** | 3 | 1
(West Germany) **Bettina Bunge** | 4 | **6** | **6**
3 | **(United States) Kathy Jordan** | **6** | **6**
(United States) Zina Garrison | 2 | 3
(United States) Joanne Russell | 3 | 4
4 | **(Socialist Federal Republic of Yugoslavia) Mima Jaušovec** | **6** | **6**
(United States) Kate Latham | 3 | 4
2 | (Czechoslovakia) **Hana Mandlíková** | **6** | **6**

Semifinals
(West Germany) **Bettina Bunge** | **6** | **6**
3 | (United States) Kathy Jordan | 3 | 3
4 | (Socialist Federal Republic of Yugoslavia) Mima Jaušovec | 3 | **6** | 1
2 | (Czechoslovakia) **Hana Mandlíková** | **6** | 3 | **6**

Final
(West Germany) Bettina Bunge | 4 | 4
2 | (Czechoslovakia) **Hana Mandlíková** | **6** | **6**
