= 1980 Avon Championships of California =

- Date: February 11–17
- Edition: 9th
- Category: Virginia Slims circuit
- Draw: 32S / 16D
- Prize money: $150,000
- Surface: Carpet (Sporteze) / indoor
- Location: Oakland, California, US
- Venue: Oakland Coliseum Arena

Champions

Singles
- (United States) Martina Navratilova

Doubles
- (United Kingdom) Sue Barker / (United States) Ann Kiyomura
| ← 1979 · | Stanford Classic | · 1981 → |

The 1980 Avon Championships of California, also known as the Avon Championships of Oakland, was a women's tennis tournament played on indoor carpet courts at the Oakland Coliseum Arena in Oakland, California in the United States that was part of the 1980 Avon Championships Circuit. It was the ninth edition of the tournament and was held from February 11 through February 17, 1980. First-seeded Martina Navratilova won the singles title, her second consecutive at the event, and earned $30,000 first-prize money.

== Finals ==
=== Singles ===
(United States) Martina Navratilova defeated (Australia) Evonne Goolagong Cawley 6–1, 7–6^{(7–4)}

- It was Navratilova's 5th singles title of the year and the 39th of her career.

=== Doubles ===
(United Kingdom) Sue Barker / (United States) Ann Kiyomura defeated (South Africa) Greer Stevens / (United Kingdom) Virginia Wade 6–0, 6–4

== Prize money ==
| Event | W | F | SF | QF | Round of 16 | Round of 32 |
| Singles | $30,000 | $15,000 | $7,350 | $3,500 | $1,750 | $1,000 |
