= 1981 Avon Championships of Houston =

- Date: February 16 – 22
- Edition: 11th
- Category: Virginia Slims circuit
- Draw: 17S / 8D
- Prize money: $100,000
- Surface: Carpet (Sporteze) / indoor
- Location: Houston, Texas, U.S.
- Venue: The Summit

Champions

Singles
- (Czechoslovakia) Hana Mandlíková

Doubles
- (United Kingdom) Sue Barker / (United States) Ann Kiyomura
- Virginia Slims of Houston

The 1981 Avon Championships of Houston was a women's tennis tournament played on indoor carpet courts at the Summit in Houston, Texas in the United States that was part of the 1981 Avon Championships Circuit. It was the 11th edition of the tournament and was held from February 16 through February 22, 1981. Second-seeded Hana Mandlíková won the singles title and earned $22,000 first-prize money. First-seeded Tracy Austin withdrew due to a back injury.

== Finals ==
=== Singles ===
(Czechoslovakia) Hana Mandlíková defeated (West Germany) Bettina Bunge 6–4, 6–4

- It was Mandlíková's 1st title of the year and the 14th of her career.

=== Doubles ===
(United Kingdom) Sue Barker / (United States) Ann Kiyomura defeated (Czechoslovakia) Regina Maršíková / (United States) Mary Lou Piatek 5–7, 6–4, 6–3

== Prize money ==
| Event | W | F | 3rd | 4th | QF | Round of 16 | Prel. round |
| Singles | $22,000 | $11,800 | $6,200 | $5,900 | $3,000 | $1,650 | $900 |
