= Lindsay Morse =

American tennis player

- Full name: Lindsay Morse Bennett
- Country (sports): United States
- Born: January 24, 1955 (age 70) Pasadena, California

Singles

Grand Slam singles results
- Australian Open: 3R (1980)
- French Open: Q1 (1980)
- Wimbledon: 3R (1980)
- US Open: 3R (1980, 1981)

Doubles
- Career titles: 1 WTA

Grand Slam doubles results
- Australian Open: 1R (1980)
- Wimbledon: 3R (1980)
- US Open: 2R (1981)

Lindsay Morse Bennett (born January 24, 1955) is an American former professional tennis player.

Morse, who grew up in Pasadena, California, was a collegiate player for UC Irvine and won the AIAW Singles Championship in 1977. She competed on the professional tour in the early 1980s and made several grand slam appearances. This included the 1980 Wimbledon Championships, where she fell in the third round to Chris Evert Lloyd. She won a WTA Tour doubles title in Nagoya in 1980, partnering UC Irvine teammate Jean Nachand.

== WTA Tour finals ==
=== Doubles (1–0) ===
Result	Date	Tournament	Surface	Partner	Opponents	Score
Win	Oct 1980	Nagoya, Japan	Hard	(United States) Jean Nachand	(Australia) Nerida Gregory (Hungary) Marie Pinterová	6–3, 6–1
