= Jean Nachand =

American professional tennis player (born 1955)

- Country (sports): United States
- Born: June 6, 1955 (age 70)
- Plays: Right-handed

Singles

Grand Slam singles results
- Australian Open: Q2 (1980)
- French Open: Q1 (1978)
- Wimbledon: Q1 (1978, 1979)
- US Open: Q2 (1978)

Doubles
- Career titles: 1 WTA

Grand Slam doubles results
- Australian Open: 1R (1980)
- Wimbledon: 2R (1978)
- US Open: 2R (1976)

Jean Nachand (born June 6, 1955) is an American former professional tennis player.

Nachand grew up in Los Angeles County, attending Palos Verdes High School. She played collegiate tennis for UC Irvine and along with Lindsay Morse was their first female All-American. In 1977 she represented the United States at the Summer Universiade in Sofia, Bulgaria On the professional tour she teamed up to Morse to win a WTA Tour doubles title in Nagoya in 1980. She has since held various executive roles for the USTA and WTA.

== WTA Tour finals ==
=== Doubles (1–0) ===
Result	Date	Tournament	Surface	Partner	Opponents	Score
Win	Oct 1980	Nagoya, Japan	Hard	(United States) Lindsay Morse	(Australia) Nerida Gregory (Hungary) Marie Pinterová	6–3, 6–1
