= Kathy Rinaldi =

American tennis player

Kathy Rinaldi-Stunkel
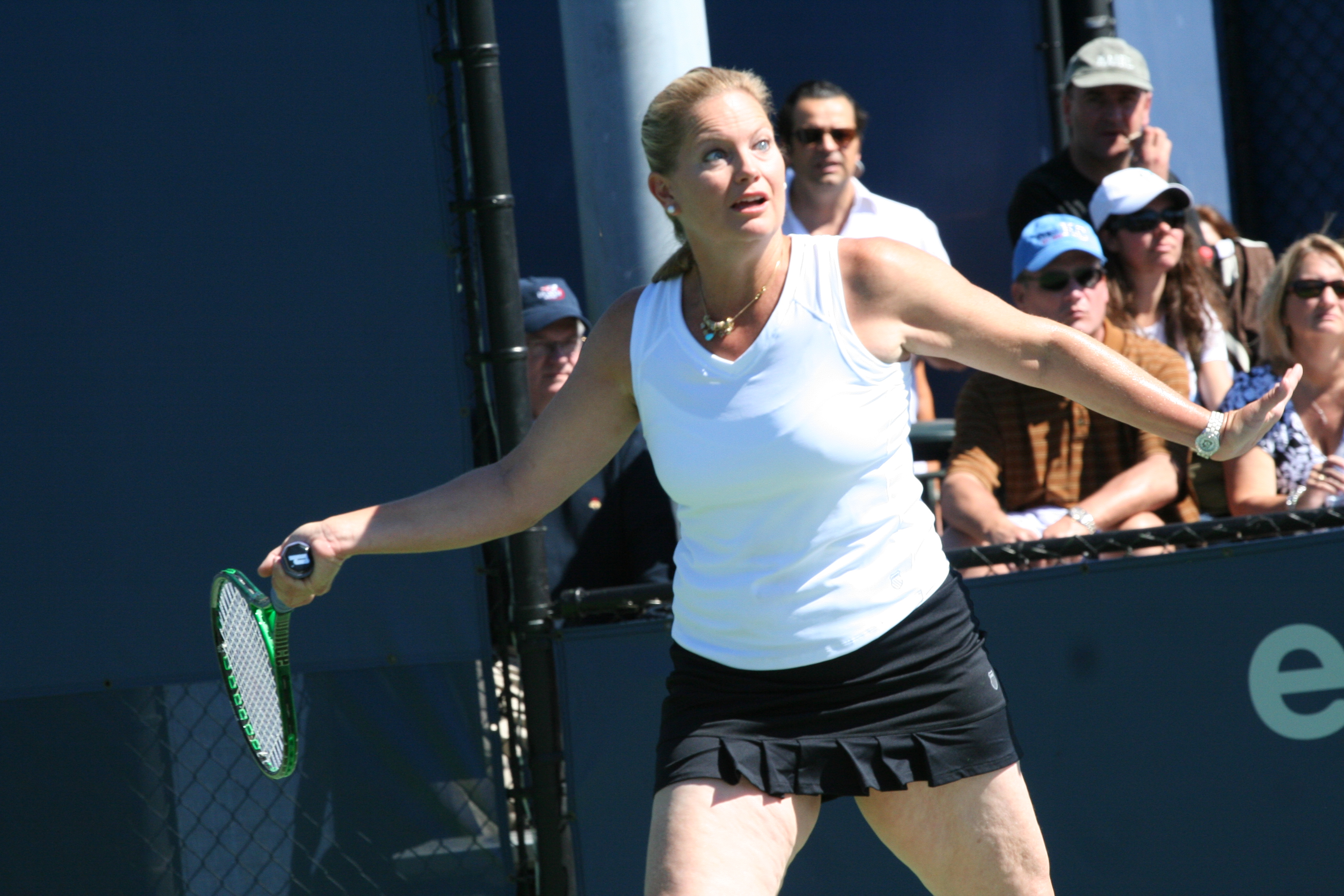
- Rinaldi in 2010
- Country (sports): United States
- Residence: Palm City, Florida, U.S.
- Born: March 24, 1967 (age 59) Stuart, Florida, U.S.
- Height: 1.68 m (5 ft 6 in)
- Turned pro: 1980
- Retired: September 1997
- Plays: Right-handed (two-handed backhand)
- Prize money: $1,417,423

Singles
- Career record: 277–217
- Career titles: 3 WTA, 0 ITF
- Highest ranking: No. 7 (May 26, 1986)

Grand Slam singles results
- Australian Open: 3R (1984)
- French Open: QF (1981, 1986)
- Wimbledon: SF (1985)
- US Open: 4R (1982)

Doubles
- Career record: 200–184
- Career titles: 2 WTA, 2 ITF
- Highest ranking: No. 13 (February 8, 1993)

Kathy Rinaldi-Stunkel (born March 24, 1967) is an American former professional tennis player, who retired in September 1997. In her career she won three singles and two doubles titles on the WTA Tour, and reached the semifinals of the 1985 Wimbledon Championships.

== Career ==
Rinaldi reached her highest career ranking on May 26, 1986, when she was ranked world No. 7. The recipient of WTA Most Impressive Newcomer Award in 1981 and WTA Comeback Player of the Year Award in 1989, she had career wins over top players such as Steffi Graf, Jana Novotná, Sue Barker, Pam Shriver, Hana Mandlíková, Wendy Turnbull, Manuela Maleeva, Dianne Fromholtz, Helena Suková, Claudia Kohde-Kilsch, Zina Garrison, Sylvia Hanika, Kathy Jordan, Jo Durie, and Natasha Zvereva.

In 1981, Rinaldi became the youngest player to win a match at Wimbledon (14 years, 91 days), a record that stood until 1990. After the 1987 French Open, she suffered a freak injury in Monte Carlo, slipping on stairs, and in trying to catch herself, fracturing her right thumb. This injury sidelined her for the rest of the year. She was a member of the US Wightman Cup Team in 1983, 1985, and 1986.

=== Fed Cup ===
In December 2016, Rinaldi was appointed as the captain of the United States Fed Cup team, succeeding Mary Joe Fernández. In her first year as Fed Cup captain, the U.S. won the 2017 Fed Cup.

== Family and personal life ==
Rinaldi married Brad Stunkel, her high school sweetheart, on December 11, 1993, and adopted his surname. She gave birth to a son, Bradley Benton "Duke" Stunkel Jr., on February 8, 1995. The family currently resides in Palm City, Florida.

== Awards and recognitions ==
- 1981: WTA Most Impressive Newcomer of the Year
- 1989: WTA Comeback of the Year

== WTA career finals ==
=== Singles: 7 (3–4) ===
Legend Grand Slam tournaments (0–0) WTA Tour Championships (0–0) Virginia Slims, Avon, other (3–4)	Finals by surface Hard (2–1) Grass (0–0) Clay (0–2) Carpet (1–1)

Result	W-L	Date	Tournament	Surface	Opponent	Score
Win	1–0	Oct 1981	Tokyo, Japan	Hard	(United States) Julie Harrington	6–1, 7–5
Loss	1–1	May 1982	Berlin, West Germany	Clay	(West Germany) Bettina Bunge	2–6, 2–6
Loss	1–2	Jul 1982	San Diego, US	Hard	(United States) Tracy Austin	6–7^{(5–7)}, 3–6
Win	2–2	Aug 1985	Mahwah, US	Hard	(West Germany) Steffi Graf	6–4, 3–6, 6–4
Loss	2–3	Sep 1985	Chicago, US	Carpet (i)	(United States) Bonnie Gadusek	1–6, 3–6
Loss	2–4	May 1986	Houston, US	Clay	(United States) Chris Evert-Lloyd	4–6, 6–2, 4–6
Win	3–3	Nov 1986	Little Rock, US	Carpet (i)	(Soviet Union) Natasha Zvereva	6–4, 6–7^{(7–9)}, 6–0

=== Doubles: 12 (2–10) ===
Legend Grand Slam tournaments (0–0) Tier I (0–2) Tier II (1–2) Tier III (1–3) Tier IV (0–2) Tier V (1–1)	Finals by surface Hard (1–7) Grass (0–0) Clay (1–2) Carpet (0–1)

Result	No.	Date	Tournament	Surface	Partner	Opponents	Score
Loss	1.	Mar 1991	San Antonio	Hard	(Canada) Jill Hetherington	(United States) Patty Fendick (Socialist Federal Republic of Yugoslavia) Monica Seles	6–7^{(2–7)}, 2–6
Win	1.	Apr 1991	Houston	Clay	(Canada) Jill Hetherington	(United States) Patty Fendick (United States) Mary Joe Fernández	6–1, 2–6, 6–1
Win	2.	Aug 1991	San Diego	Hard	(Canada) Jill Hetherington	(United States) Gigi Fernández (France) Nathalie Tauziat	6–4, 3–6, 6–2
Loss	2.	Oct 1991	Leipzig	Carpet (i)	(Canada) Jill Hetherington	(Netherlands) Manon Bollegraf (France) Isabelle Demongeot	4–6, 3–6
Loss	3.	Feb 1992	Auckland	Hard	(Canada) Jill Hetherington	(South Africa) Rosalyn Fairbank (Italy) Raffaella Reggi	6–1, 1–6, 5–7
Loss	4.	Mar 1992	Indian Wells	Hard	(Canada) Jill Hetherington	(Germany) Claudia Kohde-Kilsch (United States) Stephanie Rehe	3–6, 3–6
Loss	5.	Mar 1992	Key Biscayne	Hard	(Canada) Jill Hetherington	(Latvia) Larisa Neiland (Spain) Arantxa Sánchez Vicario	5–7, 7–5, 3–6
Loss	6.	Apr 1992	Houston	Clay	(Canada) Jill Hetherington	(United States) Patty Fendick (United States) Gigi Fernández	5–7, 4–6
Loss	7.	Nov 1992	San Juan	Hard	(United States) Gigi Fernández	(South Africa) Amanda Coetzer (South Africa) Elna Reinach	2–6, 6–4, 2–6
Loss	8.	Feb 1993	Auckland	Hard	(Canada) Jill Hetherington	(France) Isabelle Demongeot (South Africa) Elna Reinach	2–6, 4–6
Loss	9.	Mar 1993	Key Biscayne	Hard	(Canada) Jill Hetherington	(Latvia) Larisa Neiland (Czech Republic) Jana Novotná	2–6, 5–7
Loss	10.	May 1993	Strasbourg	Clay	(Canada) Jill Hetherington	(United States) Shaun Stafford (Hungary) Andrea Temesvári	7–6^{(7–5)}, 3–6, 4–6

== Grand Slam singles performance timeline ==
Key
W	F	SF	QF	#R	RR	Q#	DNQ	A	NH

(W) winner; (F) finalist; (SF) semifinalist; (QF) quarterfinalist; (#R) rounds 4, 3, 2, 1; (RR) round-robin stage; (Q#) qualification round; (DNQ) did not qualify; (A) absent; (NH) not held; (SR) strike rate (events won / competed); (W–L) win–loss record.

Tournament	1981	1982	1983	1984	1985	1986	1987	1988	1989	1990	1991	1992	1993	1994	1995	1996	Career W–L
Australian Open	A	A	1R	3R	A	NH	A	A	A	2R	1R	A	1R	1R	A	A	3–6
French Open	QF	4R	4R	3R	3R	QF	3R	1R	2R	1R	2R	1R	3R	A	A	A	24–13
Wimbledon	2R	3R	4R	1R	SF	1R	A	A	1R	1R	1R	2R	2R	A	A	1R	13–12
US Open	1R	4R	2R	2R	1R	1R	A	1R	2R	2R	2R	2R	1R	A	1R	1R	9–14
Win–loss	5–3	8–3	7–4	5–4	7–3	4–3	2–1	0–2	2–3	2–4	2–4	2–3	3–4	0–1	0–1	0–2	49–45
Year-end ranking	33	15	14	23	11	8	26	88	52	69	105	111	83	NR	NR	225	

== See also ==
- Billie Jean King Cup
- United States at the Hopman Cup

Awards and achievements
Preceded by (United States) Andrea Jaeger	WTA Most Impressive Newcomer of the Year; 1981	Succeeded by (United States) Zina Garrison
Preceded by (France) Pascale Paradis	WTA Comeback of the Year; 1989	Succeeded by (Australia) Elizabeth Smylie
