= 1981 Avon Championships of California – Singles =

Singles
- 1981 Avon Championships of California

Final
- Champion: (United States) Andrea Jaeger
- Runner-up: (United Kingdom) Virginia Wade
- Score: 6–3, 6–1

Details
- Draw: 32
- Seeds: 8

Events
Singles	Doubles
- Stanford Classic

Martina Navratilova was the defending champion.

Second-seeded Andrea Jaeger won the title, defeating fifth-seeded Virginia Wade in the final 6–3, 6–1.

== Seeds ==
A champion seed is indicated in bold text while text in italics indicates the round in which that seed was eliminated.

1. (United States) Martina Navratilova (second round)
2. (United States) **Andrea Jaeger (champion)**
3. (Australia) Wendy Turnbull (second round)
4. (United States) Barbara Jordan (quarterfinals)
5. (United Kingdom) Virginia Wade (final)
6. (Socialist Federal Republic of Yugoslavia) Mima Jaušovec (quarterfinals)
7. (United Kingdom) Sue Barker (quarterfinals)
8. N.A.

== Draw ==
Key

- Q = Qualifier
- WC = Wild card
- LL = Lucky loser
- Alt = Alternate
- ITF = ITF entry
- PR = Protected ranking
- SR = Special ranking
- SE = Special exempt
- JE = Junior exempt
- JR = Junior Accelerator Programme entrant
- CO = College Accelerator Programme entrant
- NG = Next Gen Accelerator Program entrant
- w/o = Walkover
- r = Retired
- d = Defaulted

=== Final ===
Semifinals
5	(United Kingdom) **Virginia Wade**	**6**	3	**6**
(United States) Beth Norton	3	**6**	3
3	(Australia) Wendy Turnbull	**6**	0	1
2	(United States) **Andrea Jaeger**	3	**6**	**6**

Final
5	(United Kingdom) Virginia Wade	3	1
2	(United States) **Andrea Jaeger**	**6**	**6**
