= Elizabeth Smylie =

Australian tennis player

- Country (sports): Australia
- Born: 11 April 1963 (age 63) Perth, Australia
- Height: 170 cm (5 ft 7 in)
- Turned pro: 1982
- Retired: 1997
- Plays: Right-handed
- Prize money: $1,701,837

Singles
- Career record: 181–213
- Career titles: 3
- Highest ranking: No. 20 (14 September 1987)

Grand Slam singles results
- Australian Open: QF (1987)
- French Open: 2R (1983)
- Wimbledon: 4R (1984, 1985)
- US Open: 2R (1986, 1987, 1989)

Doubles
- Career record: 483–215
- Career titles: 36
- Highest ranking: No. 5 (28 March 1988)

Grand Slam doubles results
- Australian Open: F (1993)
- French Open: SF (1984)
- Wimbledon: W (1985)
- US Open: F (1987)

Other doubles tournaments
- Tour Finals: W (1990)

Grand Slam mixed doubles results
- Australian Open: SF (1990, 1991)
- French Open: SF (1993)
- Wimbledon: W (1991)
- US Open: W (1983, 1990)
Medal record
Olympic Games
Bronze medal – third place	1988 Seoul	Doubles

Elizabeth Smylie (née Sayers, born 11 April 1963), sometimes known as Liz Smylie, is an Australian sports broadcaster and retired professional tennis player. During her career, she won four Grand Slam titles, one in women's doubles and three in mixed doubles. She also won three singles titles and 36 doubles titles on the tour. Liz also taught junior tennis players at Smith's Tennis Center, North Curl Curl. Sydney in the early 1990s.

Smylie transitioned into television commentary after 1997 following her playing career, working for the Nine Network on Wimbledon and the US Open and the Seven Network. For Seven she was notably the lead commentator for the famous 2003 Australian Open Women's Final between sisters Serena Williams and Venus Williams where Serena was trying to complete the career Grand Slam, which was specially held at night and watched by more than 2 million viewers in the five main capital cities in Australia.

== Career ==
Smylie turned professional in 1982. She won the women's doubles title at Wimbledon in 1985 with Kathy Jordan. In mixed doubles, she teamed with John Fitzgerald to win the 1983 US Open and 1991 Wimbledon titles and with Todd Woodbridge to win the 1990 US Open. She won the Virginia Slims Championships with Jordan in 1990. Her best Grand Slam performance in singles came at the Australian Open in 1987, when she reached the quarterfinals. Her highest ever singles ranking was world No. 20 and her highest in doubles was world No. 5.

She played Federation Cup from 1984 to 1994, and won a bronze medal in women's doubles with Wendy Turnbull at the 1988 Summer Olympics in Seoul.

Over her career, Smylie won three singles titles and 36 doubles titles. She won the Western Australian Sports Star of the Year award in 1985 and the Comeback Player of the Year award in 1990 and 1993.

She became a tennis commentator in the late 1990s, working for several broadcasters and across several tournaments during her post-playing career, including for Australian Open host Channel 7 in the 2000s and the BBC in the UK. Currently she works on the Australian Open world feed for Tennis Australia and can often be heard on the domestic broadcast Nine, 9Now and Stan Sport.

== Personal life ==
She is married to player-manager Peter Smylie and they have three children including professional golfer Elvis Smylie. She was the long-time tournament director of the Australian Women's Hardcourts and also works as a sports television commentator. Her brother Mervyn Sayers played one first-class cricket game for Western Australia in 1979.

== Grand Slam tournaments ==
=== Doubles: 5 (1 title, 4 runner-ups) ===
Result	Year	Championship	Surface	Partner	Opponents	Score
Win	1985	Wimbledon	Grass	(United States) Kathy Jordan	(United States) Martina Navratilova (United States) Pam Shriver	5–7, 6–3, 6–4
Loss	1987	Wimbledon	Grass	(United States) Betsy Nagelsen	(West Germany) Claudia Kohde-Kilsch (Czechoslovakia) Helena Suková	7–5, 7–5
Loss	1987	US Open	Hard	(United States) Kathy Jordan	(United States) Martina Navratilova (United States) Pam Shriver	5–7, 6–4, 6–2
Loss	1990	Wimbledon	Grass	(United States) Kathy Jordan	(Czechoslovakia) Jana Novotná (Czechoslovakia) Helena Suková	6–3, 6–4
Loss	1993	Australian Open	Hard	(United States) Pam Shriver	(United States) Gigi Fernández (Belarus) Natasha Zvereva	6–4, 6–3

=== Mixed doubles: 8 (3 titles, 5 runner-ups) ===
Result	Year	Championship	Surface	Partner	Opponents	Score
Win	1983	US Open	Hard	(Australia) John Fitzgerald	(United States) Barbara Potter (United States) Ferdi Taygan	3–6, 6–3, 6–4
Loss	1984	US Open	Hard	(Australia) John Fitzgerald	(Bulgaria) Manuela Maleeva (United States) Tom Gullikson	2–6, 7–5, 6–4
Loss	1985	Wimbledon	Grass	(Australia) John Fitzgerald	(United States) Martina Navratilova (Australia) Paul McNamee	7–5, 4–6, 6–2
Loss	1985	US Open	Hard	(Australia) John Fitzgerald	(United States) Martina Navratilova (Switzerland) Heinz Günthardt	6–3, 6–4
Loss	1988	US Open	Hard	(United States) Patrick McEnroe	(Czechoslovakia) Jana Novotná (United States) Jim Pugh	7–5, 6–3
Loss	1990	Wimbledon	Grass	(Australia) John Fitzgerald	(United States) Zina Garrison (United States) Rick Leach	7–5, 6–2
Win	1990	US Open	Hard	(Australia) Todd Woodbridge	(Soviet Union) Natasha Zvereva (United States) Jim Pugh	6–4, 6–2
Win	1991	Wimbledon	Grass	(Australia) John Fitzgerald	(Soviet Union) Natasha Zvereva (United States) Jim Pugh	7–6^{(7–4)}, 6–2

== Olympic Games ==
=== Doubles: 1 (bronze medal) ===
Result	Year	Location	Surface	Partner	Opponents	Score
Bronze	1988	Seoul	Hard	(Australia) Wendy Turnbull	Tied	DNP

Smylie and Turnbull lost their semifinal match to Zina Garrison and Pam Shriver 6–7^{(5)}, 4–6. In 1988, there was no bronze medal play-off match, both beaten semifinal pairs received bronze medals.

== Other significant finals ==
=== Year-end championships ===
==== Doubles: 1 (title) ====
Result	Year	Location	Surface	Partner	Opponents	Score
Win	1990	New York	Carpet (i)	(United States) Kathy Jordan	(Argentina) Mercedes Paz (Spain) Arantxa Sánchez Vicario	7–6^{(7–4)}, 6–4

== WTA Tour finals ==
=== Singles: 6 (3–3) ===
Legend Grand Slam tournaments (0–0) Tier I (0–0) Tier II (0–0) Tier III (0–0) Tier IV (0–1) Tier V (0–1) Virginia Slims, Avon, other (3–1)	Finals by surface Hard (2–2) Grass (0–1) Clay (1–0) Carpet (0–0)

Result	W/L	Date	Tournament	Surface	Opponent	Score
Win	1–0	Apr 1982	Sardinia, Italy	Clay	(United States) Dana Gilbert	6–3, 6–0
Win	2–0	Sep 1983	Kansas City, US	Hard	(Australia) Anne Minter	6–3, 6–1
Loss	2–1	Nov 1984	Brisbane, Australia	Grass	(Czechoslovakia) Helena Suková	4–6, 4–6
Win	3–1	Feb 1987	Oklahoma City, US	Hard	(United States) Lori McNeil	4–6, 6–3, 7–5
Loss	3–2	Apr 1989	Tokyo, Japan	Hard	(Japan) Kumiko Okamoto	4–6, 2–6
Loss	3–3	Apr 1990	Tokyo, Japan	Hard	(Sweden) Catarina Lindqvist	3–6, 2–6

=== Doubles: 69 (36–33) ===
Legend Grand Slam tournaments (1–4) WTA Championships (1–0) Tier I (2–1) Tier II (7–1) Tier III (2–3) Tier IV (3–3) Tier V (3–2) Virginia Slims, Avon, other (17–19)	Finals by surface Hard (17–10) Grass (5–12) Clay (4–1) Carpet (10–10)

Result	W/L	Date	Tournament	Surface	Partner	Opponents	Score
Loss	1.	Oct 1981	Tokyo	Hard	(United States) Kim Steinmetz	(Netherlands) Nanette Schutte (Netherlands) Marianne van der Torre	2–6, 4–6
Win	1.	Feb 1983	Ridgewood	Carpet (i)	(South Africa) Beverly Mould	(South Africa) Rosalyn Fairbank (United States) Susan Leo	7–6, 4–6, 7–5
Loss	2.	Jun 1983	Birmingham	Grass	(South Africa) Beverly Mould	(United States) Billie Jean King (United States) Sharon Walsh	2–6, 4–6
Loss	3.	Jul 1983	Newport	Grass	(United States) Barbara Jordan	(United States) Barbara Potter (United States) Pam Shriver	3–6, 1–6
Win	2.	Sep 1983	Kansas City	Hard	(United States) Sandy Collins	(Australia) Chris O'Neil (Australia) Brenda Remilton	7–5, 7–6
Loss	4.	Jan 1984	Indianapolis	Carpet (i)	(South Africa) Beverly Mould	(Brazil) Cláudia Monteiro (South Africa) Yvonne Vermaak	7–6^{(9–7)}, 4–6, 5–7
Loss	5.	Mar 1984	Tokyo	Carpet (i)	(United States) Barbara Jordan	(United States) Ann Kiyomura (United States) Pam Shriver	3–6, 7–6^{(9–7)}, 3–6
Loss	6.	Mar 1984	Dallas	Carpet (i)	(United States) Sandy Collins	(United States) Leslie Allen (United States) Anne White	4–6, 7–5, 2–6
Loss	7.	Jun 1984	Birmingham	Grass	(United States) Barbara Jordan	(United States) Leslie Allen (United States) Anne White	6–7^{(1–7)}, 3–6
Win	3.	Aug 1984	Montreal	Hard	(United States) Kathy Jordan	(West Germany) Claudia Kohde-Kilsch (Czechoslovakia) Hana Mandlíková	6–1, 6–2
Win	4.	Sep 1984	Deerfield Beach	Hard	(United States) Martina Navratilova	(United States) Barbara Potter (United States) Sharon Walsh	2–6, 6–2, 6–3
Win	5.	Oct 1984	Tampa	Hard	(Canada) Carling Bassett	(United States) Mary-Lou Piatek (United States) Wendy White	6–4, 6–3
Loss	8.	Dec 1984	Tokyo	Carpet (i)	(France) Catherine Tanvier	(West Germany) Claudia Kohde-Kilsch (Czechoslovakia) Helena Suková	4–6, 4–6
Win	6.	Jan 1985	Key Biscayne	Hard	(United States) Kathy Jordan	(Soviet Union) Svetlana Parkhomenko (Soviet Union) Larisa Savchenko	6–4, 7–6^{(7–2)}
Win	7.	Jan 1985	Marco Island	Hard	(United States) Kathy Jordan	(United States) Camille Benjamin (United States) Bonnie Gadusek	6–3, 6–3
Loss	9.	Mar 1985	Princeton	Carpet (i)	(Netherlands) Marcella Mesker	(United States) Martina Navratilova (United States) Pam Shriver	5–7, 2–6
Win	8.	Apr 1985	Tokyo	Carpet (i)	(United States) Kathy Jordan	(United States) Betsy Nagelsen (United States) Anne White	4–6, 7–5, 6–2
Win	9.	May 1985	Sydney	Carpet (i)	(United States) Pam Shriver	(United States) Barbara Potter (United States) Sharon Walsh	7–5, 7–5
Win	10.	May 1985	Melbourne	Carpet (i)	(United States) Pam Shriver	(United Kingdom) Anne Hobbs (United States) Kathy Jordan	6–2, 5–7, 6–1
Loss	10.	Jun 1985	Eastbourne	Grass	(United States) Kathy Jordan	(United States) Martina Navratilova (United States) Pam Shriver	5–7, 4–6
Win	11.	Jun 1985	Wimbledon	Grass	(United States) Kathy Jordan	(United States) Martina Navratilova (United States) Pam Shriver	5–7, 6–3, 6–4
Loss	11.	Jul 1985	Newport	Grass	(United States) Pam Shriver	(United States) Chris Evert (Australia) Wendy Turnbull	4–6, 6–7^{(2–7)}
Win	12.	Aug 1985	Mahwah	Hard	(United States) Kathy Jordan	(West Germany) Claudia Kohde-Kilsch (Czechoslovakia) Helena Suková	7–6^{(8–6)}, 6–3
Win	13.	Sep 1985	Chicago	Carpet (i)	(United States) Kathy Jordan	(United States) Elise Burgin (United States) JoAnne Russell	6–2, 6–2
Loss	12.	Dec 1985	Tokyo	Carpet (i)	(Netherlands) Marcella Mesker	(West Germany) Claudia Kohde-Kilsch (Czechoslovakia) Helena Suková	0–6, 4–6
Win	14.	Jan 1986	Key Biscayne	Hard	(United States) Kathy Jordan	(United States) Betsy Nagelsen (United States) Barbara Potter	7–6^{(8–6)}, 2–6, 6–2
Win	15.	Mar 1986	Princeton	Carpet (i)	(United States) Kathy Jordan	(Czechoslovakia) Hana Mandlíková (Czechoslovakia) Helena Suková	6–3, 7–5
Loss	13.	Mar 1986	Nashville	Carpet /u(	(United States) Kathy Jordan	(United States) Barbara Potter (United States) Pam Shriver	4–6, 3–6
Loss	14.	Jun 1986	Birmingham	Grass	(Australia) Wendy Turnbull	(United States) Elise Burgin (South Africa) Rosalyn Fairbank	2–6, 4–6
Win	16.	Aug 1986	Mahwah	Hard	(United States) Betsy Nagelsen	(West Germany) Steffi Graf (Czechoslovakia) Helena Suková	7–6^{(7–4)}, 6–3
Loss	15.	Dec 1986	Brisbane	Grass	(United States) Betsy Nagelsen	(Czechoslovakia) Hana Mandlíková (Australia) Wendy Turnbull	4–6, 3–6
Win	17.	Jan 1987	Sydney	Grass	(United States) Betsy Nagelsen	(Australia) Jenny Byrne (Australia) Janine Thompson	6–7^{(5–7)}, 7–5, 6–1
Loss	16.	Mar 1987	Piscataway	Carpet (i)	(United States) Betsy Nagelsen	(United States) Gigi Fernández (United States) Lori McNeil	1–6, 4–6
Win	18.	May 1987	Geneva	Clay	(United States) Betsy Nagelsen	(Peru) Laura Gildemeister (France) Catherine Tanvier	4–6, 6–4, 6–3
Loss	17.	Jun 1987	Eastbourne	Grass	(South Africa) Rosalyn Fairbank	(Soviet Union) Svetlana Parkhomenko (Soviet Union) Larisa Savchenko	6–7^{(6–8)}, 6–4, 5–7
Loss	18.	Jun 1987	Wimbledon	Grass	(United States) Betsy Nagelsen	(West Germany) Claudia Kohde-Kilsch (Czechoslovakia) Helena Suková	5–7, 5–7
Loss	19.	Aug 1987	Mahwah	Hard	(United Kingdom) Anne Hobbs	(United States) Gigi Fernández (United States) Lori McNeil	3–6, 2–6
Loss	20.	Aug 1987	US Open	Hard	(United States) Kathy Jordan	(United States) Martina Navratilova (United States) Pam Shriver	7–5, 4–6, 2–6
Win	19.	Jun 1988	Eastbourne	Grass	(West Germany) Eva Pfaff	(New Zealand) Belinda Cordwell (South Africa) Dinky Van Rensburg	6–3, 7–6^{(8–6)}
Loss	21.	Jan 1989	Sydney	Hard	(Australia) Wendy Turnbull	(United States) Martina Navratilova (United States) Pam Shriver	3–6, 3–6
Loss	22.	Jan 1989	Auckland	Hard	(Australia) Janine Thompson	(United States) Patty Fendick (Canada) Jill Hetherington	4–6, 4–6
Win	20.	Feb 1989	Wellington	Hard	(Australia) Janine Thompson	(Australia) Tracey Morton (Austria) Heidi Sprung	7–6^{(7–3)}, 6–1
Loss	23.	Feb 1989	Oklahoma City	Hard (i)	(United States) Elise Burgin	(United States) Lori McNeil (United States) Betsy Nagelsen	w/o
Win	21.	Apr 1989	Singapore	Hard	(New Zealand) Belinda Cordwell	(United States) Ann Henricksson (United States) Beth Herr	6–7^{(6–8)}, 6–2, 6–1
Win	22.	Apr 1989	Tokyo	Hard	(Canada) Jill Hetherington	(United States) Ann Henricksson (United States) Beth Herr	6–1, 6–3
Win	23.	May 1989	Rome	Clay	(Australia) Janine Thompson	(Netherlands) Manon Bollegraf (Argentina) Mercedes Paz	6–4, 6–3
Win	24.	May 1989	Berlin	Clay	(Australia) Janine Thompson	(South Africa) Lise Gregory (United States) Gretchen Magers	5–7, 6–3, 6–2
Loss	24.	Jul 1989	Newport	Grass	(Australia) Wendy Turnbull	(United States) Gigi Fernández (United States) Lori McNeil	3–6, 6–7^{(5–7)}, 5–7
Loss	25.	Sep 1989	Tokyo	Carpet	(Australia) Wendy Turnbull	(United States) Gigi Fernández (United States) Robin White	2–6, 2–6
Win	25.	Jan 1990	Tokyo	Carpet (i)	(United States) Gigi Fernández	(Australia) Jo-Anne Faull (Australia) Rachel McQuillan	6–2, 6–2
Win	26.	Mar 1990	San Antonio	Hard	(United States) Kathy Jordan	(United States) Gigi Fernández (United States) Robin White	7–5, 7–5
Win	27.	Apr 1990	Tokyo	Hard	(United States) Kathy Jordan	(Australia) Michelle Jaggard (United States) Hu Na	6–0, 3–6, 6–1
Loss	26.	May 1990	Strasbourg	Clay	(United States) Kathy Jordan	(Australia) Nicole Provis (South Africa) Elna Reinach	1–6, 4–6
Loss	27.	Jun 1990	Wimbledon	Grass	(United States) Kathy Jordan	(Czechoslovakia) Jana Novotná (Czechoslovakia) Helena Suková	3–6, 4–6
Win	28.	Nov 1990	VS Championships	Carpet (i)	(United States) Kathy Jordan	(Argentina) Mercedes Paz (Spain) Arantxa Sánchez Vicario	7–6^{(7–4)}, 6–4
Win	29.	Jan 1991	Tokyo	Carpet (i)	(United States) Kathy Jordan	(United States) Mary Joe Fernández (United States) Robin White	4–6, 6–0, 6–3
Win	30.	May 1991	Geneva	Clay	(Australia) Nicole Provis	(Switzerland) Cathy Caverzasio (Switzerland) Manuela Maleeva-Fragnière	6–1, 6–2
Win	31.	Jun 1991	Birmingham	Grass	(Australia) Nicole Provis	(United States) Sandy Collins (South Africa) Elna Reinach	6–3, 6–4
Win	32.	Jan 1993	Sydney	Hard	(United States) Pam Shriver	(United States) Lori McNeil (Australia) Rennae Stubbs	7–6^{(7–4)}, 6–2
Loss	28.	Jan 1993	Australian Open	Hard	(United States) Pam Shriver	(United States) Gigi Fernández (Belarus) Natasha Zvereva	4–6, 3–6
Loss	29.	Jun 1993	Birmingham	Grass	(United States) Pam Shriver	(United States) Lori McNeil (United States) Martina Navratilova	3–6, 4–6
Win	33.	Jul 1993	Stratton Mountain	Hard	(Czech Republic) Helena Suková	(Switzerland) Manuela Maleeva-Fragnière (Argentina) Mercedes Paz	6–1, 6–2
Loss	30.	Aug 1993	San Diego	Hard	(United States) Pam Shriver	(United States) Gigi Fernández (Czech Republic) Helena Suková	4–6, 3–6
Win	34.	Jan 1994	Tokyo	Carpet (i)	(United States) Pam Shriver	(Netherlands) Manon Bollegraf (United States) Martina Navratilova	6–3, 3–6, 7–6^{(7–3)}
Loss	31.	Feb 1994	Osaka	Carpet (i)	(United States) Pam Shriver	(Latvia) Larisa Neiland (Australia) Rennae Stubbs	4–6, 7–6^{(7–2)}, 5–7
Win	35.	Jul 1994	Stratton Mountain	Hard	(United States) Pam Shriver	(Spain) Conchita Martínez (Spain) Arantxa Sánchez Vicario	7–6^{(7–4)}, 2–6, 7–5
Loss	32.	Aug 1994	Montreal	Hard	(United States) Pam Shriver	(United States) Meredith McGrath (Spain) Arantxa Sánchez Vicario	6–2, 2–6, 4–6
Loss	33.	Aug 1994	Schenectady	Hard	(United States) Pam Shriver	(United States) Meredith McGrath (Latvia) Larisa Neiland	2–6, 2–6
Win	36.	Jun 1996	Birmingham	Grass	(United States) Linda Wild	(United States) Lori McNeil (France) Nathalie Tauziat	6–3, 3–6, 6–1

== Grand Slam performance timelines ==
Key
W	F	SF	QF	#R	RR	Q#	DNQ	A	NH

(W) winner; (F) finalist; (SF) semifinalist; (QF) quarterfinalist; (#R) rounds 4, 3, 2, 1; (RR) round-robin stage; (Q#) qualification round; (DNQ) did not qualify; (A) absent; (NH) not held; (SR) strike rate (events won / competed); (W–L) win–loss record.

=== Singles ===
Tournament	1980	1981	1982	1983	1984	1985	1986	1987	1988	1989	1990	1991	1992	1993	1994	Career SR
Australian Open	1R	A	1R	2R	1R	2R	NH	QF	1R	1R	3R	3R	A	1R	1R	0 / 12
French Open	A	A	A	2R	1R	A	1R	1R	A	1R	1R	1R	A	1R	A	0 / 8
Wimbledon	A	2R	1R	1R	4R	4R	3R	3R	1R	3R	1R	3R	A	2R	1R	0 / 13
US Open	A	1R	A	1R	1R	1R	2R	2R	A	2R	1R	1R	A	1R	A	0 / 10
SR	0 / 1	0 / 2	0 / 2	0 / 4	0 / 4	0 / 3	0 / 3	0 / 4	0 / 2	0 / 4	0 / 4	0 / 4	0 / 0	0 / 4	0 / 2	0 / 43
Year-end ranking	96	225	115	73	36	43	114	27	154	66	53	115	336	119	194	

=== Doubles ===
Tournament	1980	1981	1982	1983	1984	1985	1986	1987	1988	1989	1990	1991	1992	1993	1994	1995	1996	1997	Career SR
Australian Open	QF	2R	1R	2R	1R	2R	NH	1R	SF	QF	3R	QF	A	F	SF	A	1R	1R	0 / 15
French Open	A	A	3R	2R	SF	A	A	QF	A	1R	2R	2R	A	2R	2R	A	3R	A	0 / 10
Wimbledon	A	A	1R	1R	2R	W	QF	F	QF	3R	F	3R	1R	SF	QF	A	SF	1R	1 / 15
US Open	A	1R	2R	3R	3R	2R	QF	F	1R	2R	SF	2R	2R	3R	3R	A	1R	A	0 / 15
SR	0 / 1	0 / 2	0 / 4	0 / 4	0 / 4	1 / 3	0 / 2	0 / 4	0 / 3	0 / 4	0 / 4	0 / 4	0 / 2	0 / 4	0 / 4	0 / 0	0 / 4	0 / 2	1 / 55
Year-end ranking					13	7	8	8	20	12	10	14	54	9	13	NR	27	NR	

- NR = not ranked

=== Mixed doubles ===
Tournament	1983	1984	1985	1986	1987	1988	1989	1990	1991	1992	1993	1994	1995	1996	1997	Career SR
Australian Open	NH	NH	NH	NH	2R	QF	QF	SF	SF	A	QF	2R	A	1R	1R	0 / 9
French Open	2R	QF	A	A	1R	A	A	3R	A	A	SF	2R	A	A	A	0 / 6
Wimbledon	A	SF	F	QF	QF	SF	2R	F	W	2R	3R	QF	A	3R	A	1 / 12
US Open	W	F	F	SF	2R	F	2R	W	2R	1R	2R	1R	A	1R	A	2 / 13
SR	1 / 2	0 / 3	0 / 2	0 / 2	0 / 4	0 / 3	0 / 3	1 / 4	1 / 3	0 / 2	0 / 4	0 / 4	0 / 0	0 / 3	0 / 1	3 / 40
