= Nanette Schutte =

Dutch tennis player

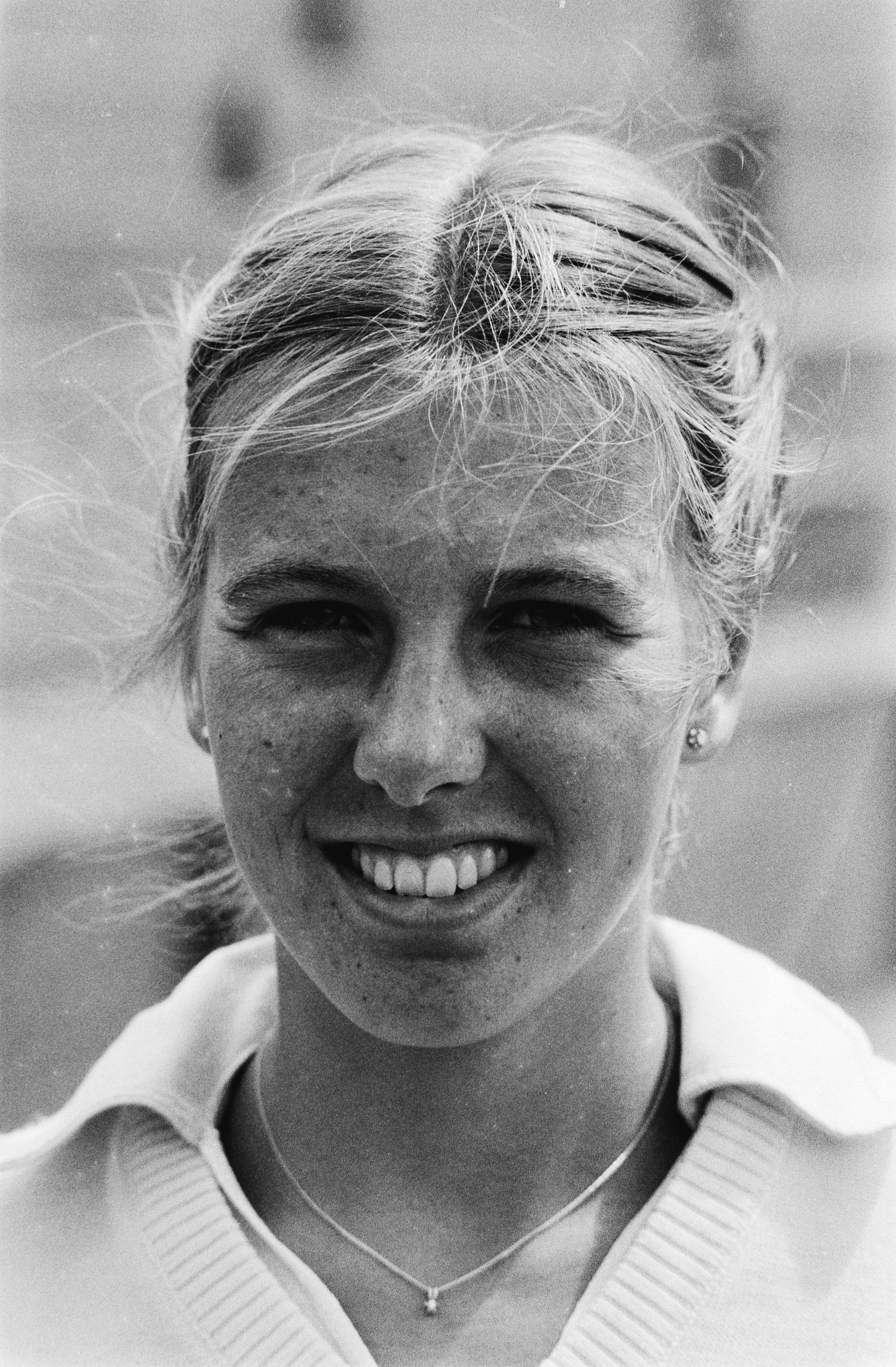
- Country (sports): Netherlands
- Born: 6 April 1962 (age 64) Netherlands
- Prize money: $30,923

Singles
- Career record: 48–46
- Career titles: 0
- Highest ranking: No. 190 (19 January 1987)

Grand Slam singles results
- Australian Open: 2R (1980)
- French Open: 2R (1980, 1981)
- US Open: 2R (1981)

Doubles
- Career record: 36–22
- Career titles: 1
- Highest ranking: No. 153 (2 February 1987)

Grand Slam doubles results
- Australian Open: 1R (1980)
- French Open: 1R (1986, 1987)
- Wimbledon: 2R (1981)
- US Open: 3R (1980)

Team competitions
- Fed Cup: 5–3

Nanette Schutte (born 6 April 1962) is a Dutch former professional tennis player who was active during the 1980s.

Schutte was junior singles champion of the Netherlands in the age categories Under-12, 14, 16 and 18.

She reached a highest singles ranking of world No. 190 in 1987. During her career, Schutte reached the second round of the singles event in three Grand Slam tournaments. Her best result at a major championship was reaching the third round of the doubles event at the 1980 US Open, where she and her teammate Marcella Mesker lost to Candy Reynolds and Paula Smith.

In October 1981, she partnered Marianne van der Torre to win the doubles title at the Borden Classic in Japan, defeating Elizabeth Smylie and Kim Steinmetz in the final, in straight sets.

Schutte was a member of the Dutch Federation Cup team in 1980, 1985 and 1986 and compiled a 5–3 win–loss record.

== WTA Tour finals ==
=== Doubles: 1 (title) ===
Result	Date	Tournament	Surface	Partner	Opponents	Score
Win	Oct 1981	Tokyo, Japan	Hard	(Netherlands) Marianne van der Torre	(Australia) Elizabeth Smylie (United States) Kim Steinmetz	6–2, 6–4
