= Roberta McCallum =

American tennis player

- Full name: Roberta McCallum Russo
- Country (sports): United States
- Born: November 3, 1958 (age 67)

Grand Slam singles results
- French Open: 1R (1980)
- Wimbledon: 1R (1980)
- US Open: 2R (1980, 1981)

Grand Slam doubles results
- French Open: 2R (1980)
- Wimbledon: 2R (1980)
- US Open: 2R (1980)

Roberta McCallum Russo (born November 3, 1958) is a former professional tennis player from the United States.

== Biography ==
=== Tennis career ===
McCallum went to high school in Mount Lebanon, Pennsylvania, then attended Pepperdine University, playing collegiate tennis with the Waves in 1977 and 1978.

She spent two years playing on the professional tour, with her breakthrough performance a semi-final appearance at the Greater Pittsburgh Open in 1979, before making her first overseas tour in Australia at the end of the year. At the 1980 Avon Championships of Los Angeles she had wins over Pam Shriver and Kathy Jordan to make the quarter-finals and was also a quarter-finalist that year at the US Indoor Championships. As a doubles player she made a WTA Tour final in 1981, at the Japan Open, where she and partner Barbara Jordan finished runners-up. During her career she featured in the main draw of the French Open, Wimbledon Championships and US Open.

=== Personal life ===
McCallum was married to former Virginia Tech football captain Vince Russo, before his death in 1995, at the age of 45. With Vince she has a daughter named Alexandra.

== WTA Tour finals ==
=== Doubles (0–1) ===
Result	Date	Tournament	Tier	Surface	Partner	Opponents	Score
Loss	Oct 1981	Tokyo, Japan	Category 1	Hard	(United States) Barbara Jordan	(Brazil) Patricia Medrado (Brazil) Cláudia Monteiro	3–6, 6–3, 2–6
