= Julie Harrington =

American tennis player (born 1962)

- Full name: Julie Harrington
- Country (sports): United States
- Born: February 5, 1962 (age 64)
- Plays: Left-handed

Singles
- Highest ranking: No. 70 (December 5, 1983)

Grand Slam singles results
- French Open: 3R (1981)
- Wimbledon: 1R (1980)
- US Open: 3R (1979, 1981)

Grand Slam doubles results
- French Open: 2R (1979, 1980)
- US Open: 2R (1981)

Julie Harrington (born February 5, 1962) is a former professional tennis player from the United States.

== Tennis career ==
Harrington was a left-handed player, who grew up in Spokane, Washington. She attended the local Joel E. Ferris High School and turned professional at the age of 16. As a qualifier at the 1979 US Open she beat 14th seed Pam Shriver, then overcame Peanut Louie Harper in the second round, before losing in three sets to Jeanne DuVall. She made the third round of grand slam tournaments on two further occasions, both in 1981, at the French and US Open. A two-time WTA Tour finalist, she was runner-up in the singles at Kyoto in 1981 and at the 1983 Bakersfield Open.

== WTA Tour finals ==
=== Singles (0-2) ===
Result	W/L	Date	Tournament	Category	Surface	Opponent	Score
Loss	0–1	Oct 1981	Tokyo, Japan	Category 1	Hard	(United States) Kathy Rinaldi	1–6, 5–7
Loss	0–2	Sep 1983	Bakersfield, U.S.	Category 1+	Hard	(South Africa) Jennifer Mundel	4–6, 1–6
