= Marianne van der Torre =

Dutch tennis player (born 1961)

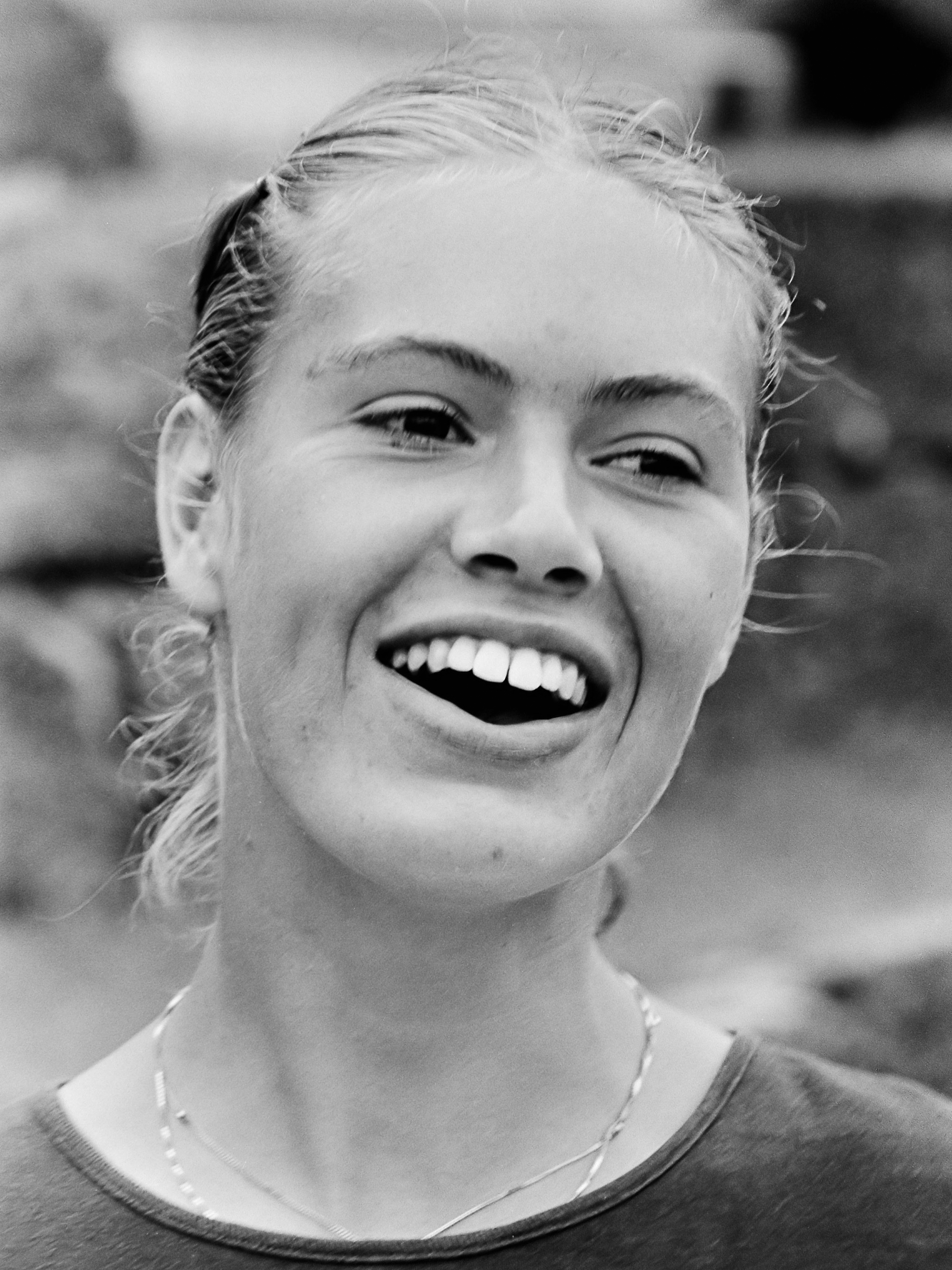
- Van der Torre in 1980
- Country (sports): Netherlands
- Born: 18 August 1961 (age 64) Rotterdam, Netherlands
- Plays: Right-handed
- Prize money: $93,311

Singles
- Career record: 124–95
- Career titles: 1
- Highest ranking: No. 84 (31 December 1981)

Grand Slam singles results
- Australian Open: 1R (1987, 1988)
- French Open: 2R (1981, 1982)
- US Open: 2R (1981)

Doubles
- Career record: 111–64
- Career titles: 1
- Highest ranking: No. 60 (28 March 1988)

Grand Slam doubles results
- Australian Open: 2R (1988)
- French Open: 2R (1981, 1987, 1988)
- Wimbledon: 1R (1987)
- US Open: 1R (1981, 1987)

Grand Slam mixed doubles results
- Australian Open: SF (1988)

Team competitions
- Fed Cup: 18–13

Marianne van der Torre (born 18 August 1961) is a Dutch former professional tennis player who was active during the 1980s.

She reached a highest singles ranking of world No. 84 in December 1981. During her career, van der Torre reached the second round of the singles event in two Grand Slam tournaments; the French Open (1981 and 1982) and the US Open (1981). Her best result at a Grand Slam championship was reaching the semifinal of the mixed-doubles event at the 1988 Australian Open, partnering Martin Davis.

In October 1981, she partnered with compatriot Nanette Schutte to win the doubles title at the Borden Classic in Kyoto, defeating Elizabeth Smylie and Kim Steinmetz in the final, in straight sets.

Van der Torre was a member of the Dutch Federation Cup team between 1981 and 1987, playing in a total of 19 ties and compiling an 18–13 win–loss record.

In 1980, she received the Tom Schreursprijs for best Dutch sports talent.

== WTA Tour finals ==
=== Singles: 1 (title) ===
Result	Date	Tournament	Surface	Opponent	Score
Win	Feb 1981	VS of Pennsylvania, US	Carpet (i)	(West Germany) Heidi Eisterlehner	6–0, 7–6

=== Doubles: 1 (title) ===
Result	Date	Tournament	Surface	Partner	Opponents	Score
Win	Oct 1981	Tokyo, Japan	Hard	(Netherlands) Nanette Schutte	(Australia) Elizabeth Smylie (United States) Kim Steinmetz	6–2, 6–4

== ITF finals ==
$25,000 tournaments
$10,000 tournaments

=== Singles (4–4) ===
Result	No.	Date	Tournament	Surface	Opponent	Score
Loss	1.	28 October 1985	ITF Fukuoka, Japan	Hard	(United States) Joy Cummings	2–6, 4–6
Loss	2.	4 November 1985	ITF Ibaraki, Japan	Hard	(Netherlands) Nanette Schutte	6–7, 1–6
Win	3.	15 September 1986	ITF Sofia, Bulgaria	Clay	(Italy) Sabina Simmonds	6–4, 6–2
Win	4.	3 November 1986	ITF Matsuyama, Japan	Hard	(France) Isabelle Crudo	6–1, 2–0 ret.
Loss	5.	17 August 1987	ITF Manhasset, United States	Clay	(West Germany) Gabriela Dinu	6–7, 3–6
Loss	6.	6 March 1989	ITF Ashkelon, Israel	Hard	(Austria) Beate Reinstadler	3–6, 6–1, 2–6
Win	7.	13 March 1989	ITF Haifa, Israel	Hard	(France) Valérie Batut	2–6, 6–4, 6–4
Win	8.	20 March 1989	ITF Ramat Hasharon, Israel	Hard	(Israel) Dahlia Coriat	6–2, 6–1

=== Doubles (14–10) ===
Result	No.	Date	Tournament	Surface	Partner	Opponents	Score
Loss	1.	25 July 1981	ITF Geneva, Switzerland	Clay	(Switzerland) Annemarie Rüegg	(Switzerland) Susanne Villaverde (Argentina) Liliana Giussani	4–6, 6–4, 0–6
Win	2.	2 January 1984	ITF Chicago, United States	Hard	(Switzerland) Csilla Bartos-Cserepy	(Soviet Union) Larisa Neiland (Soviet Union) Svetlana Parkhomenko	w/o
Loss	3.	15 October 1984	ITF Haifa, Israel	Hard	(Sweden) Elizabeth Ekblom	(West Germany) Martina Reinhardt (United Kingdom) Joy Tacon	2–6, 5–7
Win	4.	22 October 1984	ITF Eilat, Israel	Hard	(Sweden) Elizabeth Ekblom	(Hungary) Anita Falcon (Spain) Maria Méndez Casariego	6–4, 4–6, 7–6
Win	5.	12 November 1984	ITF Peterborough, United Kingdom	Hard	(Hong Kong) Patricia Hy	(United Kingdom) Glynis Coles-Bond (United Kingdom) Denise Parnell	6–2, 0–6, 6–1
Win	6.	26 November 1984	ITF Darlington, United Kingdom	Hard	(Hong Kong) Patricia Hy	(United Kingdom) Cathy Drury (United Kingdom) Ellinore Lightbody	6–1, 6–4
Loss	7.	7 January 1985	ITF Key Biscayne, United States	Hard	(Sweden) Elizabeth Ekblom	(United States) Lynn Lewis (Canada) Wendy Barlow-Pattenden	7–5, 4–6, 1–6
Win	8.	14 January 1985	ITF Delray Beach, United States	Hard	(Sweden) Elizabeth Ekblom	(United States) Diane Farrell (United States) Jaime Kaplan	6–3, 7–5
Loss	9.	21 January 1985	ITF San Antonio, United States	Hard	(Sweden) Elizabeth Ekblom	(France) Isabelle Demongeot (France) Nathalie Tauziat	3–6, 4–6
Win	10.	21 October 1985	ITF Saga, Japan	Hard	(Netherlands) Nanette Schutte	(China) Li Xinyi (China) Zhong Ni	6–2, 6–4
Win	11.	28 October 1985	ITF Fukuoka, Japan	Hard	(Netherlands) Nanette Schutte	(Japan) Ei Iida (Japan) Naoko Sato	6–3, 7–5
Loss	12.	4 November 1985	ITF Ibaraki, Japan	Hard	(Netherlands) Nanette Schutte	(Japan) Ei Iida (China) Zhong Ni	5–7, 3–6
Win	13.	11 November 1985	ITF Matsuyama, Japan	Hard	(Netherlands) Nanette Schutte	(Japan) Ei Iida (China) Zhong Ni	6–2, 6–1
Win	14.	25 November 1985	ITF Kyoto, Japan	Hard	(Netherlands) Nanette Schutte	(Japan) Ei Iida (China) Zhong Ni	6–4, 6–2
Win	15.	20 January 1986	ITF San Antonio, United States	Hard	(Netherlands) Manon Bollegraf	(South Africa) Dinky Van Rensburg (United Kingdom) Clare Wood	7–5, 6–7^{(4)}, 6–4
Win	16.	31 March 1986	ITF Bari, Italy	Clay	(Netherlands) Nanette Schutte	(United Kingdom) Belinda Borneo (West Germany) Wiltrud Probst	4–6, 7–6, 6–3
Loss	17.	7 April 1986	ITF Caserta, Italy	Clay	(West Germany) Wiltrud Probst	(Argentina) Bettina Fulco (Brazil) Gisele Miro	3–6, 3–6
Loss	18.	14 July 1986	ITF Landskrona, Sweden	Clay	(Netherlands) Manon Bollegraf	(Netherlands) Carin Bakkum (Netherlands) Nicole Jagerman	6–4, 2–6, 2–6
Loss	19.	15 September 1986	ITF Sofia, Bulgaria	Clay	(Italy) Laura Golarsa	(Soviet Union) Natalia Egorova (Soviet Union) Viktoria Milvidskaia	0–6, 2–6
Loss	20.	20 October 1986	ITF Saga, Japan	Grass	(Brazil) Themis Zambrzycki	(Indonesia) Yayuk Basuki (Indonesia) Suzanna Wibowo	2–6, 3–6
Loss	21.	17 August 1987	ITF Manhasset, United States	Clay	(Netherlands) Brenda Schultz-McCarthy	(Israel) Ilana Berger (United States) Jane Thomas	4–6, 1–6
Win	22.	27 February 1989	ITF Jaffa, Israel	Hard	(Netherlands) Caroline Vis	(United Kingdom) Caroline Billingham (Poland) Sylvia Czopek	3–6, 6–1, 6–3
Win	23.	6 March 1989	ITF Ashkelon, Israel	Hard	(Netherlands) Caroline Vis	(Denmark) Sofie Albinus (Denmark) Lone Vandborg	6–1, 6–1
Win	24.	20 March 1989	ITF Ramat HaSharon, Israel	Hard	(Netherlands) Caroline Vis	(Sweden) Malin Nilsson (Sweden) Eva Lena Olsson	6–2, 6–2
