= Marie Pinterová =

Czech tennis player, later Hungarian

- Full name: Marie Neumannová Pinterová
- Country (sports): Czechoslovakia; Hungary
- Born: 16 August 1946 (age 80) Stará Boleslav, Czechoslovakia
- Height: 1.75 m (5 ft 9 in)
- Turned pro: 1969

Singles
- Career record: 12–26
- Career titles: 2
- Highest ranking: No. 47 (year-end 1981)

Grand Slam singles results
- Australian Open: 3R (1980)
- French Open: QF (1974)
- Wimbledon: 2R (1978, 1979, 1981)
- US Open: 3R (1978)

Doubles
- Career record: 14–22
- Highest ranking: No. 303 (5 January 1987)

Marie Pinterová (née Neumannová, born 16 August 1946) is a former professional tennis player who played from 1969 to 1989.

== Life ==
Marie Neumannová was born in 1946 in Stará Boleslav. She began her professional career in 1969. In 1974, she married Hungarian engineer András Pintér. They had one son, Karim, in 1976. Pinterová returned to professional tennis at the age of 34 and won the Tokyo title.

== Career ==
In 1974, she played the quarterfinals at Roland Garros, her best performance in a single round of the Grand Slam. She won two WTA singles during her career, first in Florida in 1972 (opposite Billie Jean King in the final), the second in Japan in 1981.

During her career, Pinterová won:

- Two Czech Internationals
- Virginia Slims of Jacksonville
- The Cairo Open
- The Japan Open
- The World University Games

She had wins against Martina Navratilova, Sue Barker and Kathy Jordan.

She played on the European senior circuit of the ITF from 1995. She won 11 World singles championship titles and 24 European titles.
