= Kim Steinmetz =

American tennis player

- Country (sports): United States
- Born: December 22, 1957 (age 68) St. Louis, Missouri, US
- Prize money: US$ 163,082

Singles
- Career titles: 0

Grand Slam singles results
- Australian Open: 1R (1981, 1988)
- French Open: 3R (1982)
- Wimbledon: 3R (1984)
- US Open: 2R (1982, 1983, 1988)

Doubles
- Career titles: 0

Grand Slam doubles results
- Australian Open: 1R (1984, 1985, 1988)
- French Open: 2R (1982, 1983, 1986)
- Wimbledon: 2R (1987, 1989)
- US Open: 1R (1981, 1982, 1984, 1985, 1986, 1987)

Kim Steinmetz (born December 22, 1957) is an American former professional Women's Tennis Association (WTA) player. She was born and raised in St. Louis, Missouri. She retired from professional tennis in 1989.

== Career highlights ==
Steinmetz competed in over 26 Grand Slam (tennis) tournaments over her 10-year tennis career.

Steinmetz' victory over Natasha Zvereva in the 1988 U.S. Open is often cited as her greatest victory. Following her win over Zvereva, Steinmetz lost to Arantxa Sánchez Vicario.

== Post career ==
Following her retirement from professional tennis, Steinmetz began teaching in 1990. She is currently the tennis director at the Missouri Athletic Club.

== Earnings ==
Steinmetz' career earnings on the professional tour totaled $90,856.
