= 1984 United Airlines Tournament of Champions – Doubles =

Doubles
- 1984 United Airlines Tournament of Champions

Final
- Champions: (West Germany) Claudia Kohde-Kilsch (Czechoslovakia) Hana Mandlíková
- Runners-up: (United Kingdom) Anne Hobbs (Australia) Wendy Turnbull
- Score: 6–0, 1–6, 6–3

Details
- Draw: 7
- Seeds: 4

Events
Singles	Doubles
← 1983 ·	United Airlines Tournament of Champions	· 1985 →

Billie Jean King and Anne Smith were the defending champions, but none competed this year.

Claudia Kohde-Kilsch and Hana Mandlíková won the title by defeating Anne Hobbs and Wendy Turnbull 6–0, 1–6, 6–3 in the final.

== Seeds ==
The top seed received a bye to the semifinals.

1. (United Kingdom) Anne Hobbs / (Australia) Wendy Turnbull (final)
2. (United States) Bonnie Gadusek / (United States) Wendy White (first round)
3. (Switzerland) Christiane Jolissaint / (Netherlands) Marcella Mesker (semifinals, withdrew)
4. (West Germany) Claudia Kohde-Kilsch / (Czechoslovakia) Hana Mandlíková (champions)

== Draw ==
=== Key ===
- Q = Qualifier
- WC = Wild card
- LL = Lucky loser
- Alt = Alternate
- ITF = ITF entry
- PR = Protected ranking
- SR = Special ranking
- SE = Special exempt
- JE = Junior exempt
- JR = Junior Accelerator Programme entrant
- CO = College Accelerator Programme entrant
- NG = Next Gen Accelerator Program entrant
- w/o = Walkover
- r = Retired
- d = Defaulted

=== Draw ===
First round
(United States) Caryn Copeland-Wilson (United States) Lori McNeil	4	3
3	(Switzerland) Christiane Jolissaint (Netherlands) Marcella Mesker	6	6
4	(West Germany) Claudia Kohde-Kilsch (Czechoslovakia) Hana Mandlíková	6	6
(United States) Sandy Collins (Australia) Elizabeth Smylie	0	0
(United States) Kathleen Horvath (Romania) Virginia Ruzici	7	6
2	(United States) Bonnie Gadusek (United States) Wendy White	5	3

Semifinals
1	(United Kingdom) Anne Hobbs (Australia) Wendy Turnbull	w/o
3	(Switzerland) Christiane Jolissaint (Netherlands) Marcella Mesker
4	(West Germany) Claudia Kohde-Kilsch (Czechoslovakia) Hana Mandlíková	4	7	6
(United States) Kathleen Horvath (Romania) Virginia Ruzici	6	6	3

Final
1	(United Kingdom) Anne Hobbs (Australia) Wendy Turnbull	0	6	3
4	(West Germany) Claudia Kohde-Kilsch (Czechoslovakia) Hana Mandlíková	6	1	6
