= 1984 United Airlines Tournament of Champions – Singles =

Singles
- 1984 United Airlines Tournament of Champions

Final
- Champion: (United States) Martina Navratilova
- Runner-up: (Peru) Laura Gildemeister
- Score: 6–0, 6–1

Details
- Draw: 28
- Seeds: 8

Events
Singles	Doubles
← 1983 ·	United Airlines Tournament of Champions	· 1985 →

Martina Navratilova won her fifth consecutive title at Orlando, by defeating Laura Gildemeister 6–0, 6–1 in the final.

== Seeds ==
The first four seeds received a bye to the second round.

1. (United States) Martina Navratilova (champion)
2. (Czechoslovakia) Hana Mandlíková (second round)
3. (United Kingdom) Jo Durie (quarterfinals)
4. (United States) Bonnie Gadusek (semifinals)
5. (Hungary) Andrea Temesvári (quarterfinals)
6. (United States) Kathleen Horvath (quarterfinals)
7. (West Germany) Sylvia Hanika (quarterfinals)
8. (Romania) Virginia Ruzici (second round)

== Draw ==
=== Key ===
- Q = Qualifier
- WC = Wild card
- LL = Lucky loser
- Alt = Alternate
- ITF = ITF entry
- PR = Protected ranking
- SR = Special ranking
- SE = Special exempt
- JE = Junior exempt
- JR = Junior Accelerator Programme entrant
- CO = College Accelerator Programme entrant
- NG = Next Gen Accelerator Program entrant
- w/o = Walkover
- r = Retired
- d = Defaulted

=== Finals ===
Semifinals
1	(United States) Martina Navratilova	6	6
4	(United States) Bonnie Gadusek	3	1
(United States) Lisa Bonder	6	2	6
(Peru) Laura Gildemeister	1	6	7

Final
1	(United States) Martina Navratilova	6	6
(Peru) Laura Gildemeister	0	1

=== Top half ===
First round
(United States) Carol Daniels	1	4
(United States) K Jones-Shaefer	6	6
(United States) ML Daniels	1	5
(France) C Tanvier	6	7
(Japan) E Inoue	6	2	0
6	(United States) K Horvath	0	6	6
(United States) J Russell	3	7	3
(United States) J Klitch	6	6	6
(United States) A Moulton	4	4
(Italy) F Bonsignori	6	6
(South Africa) Y Vermaak	2	1
7	(West Germany) S Hanika	6	6

Second round
1	(United States) M Navratilova	6	6
(United States) K Jones-Shaefer	1	2
(France) C Tanvier	4	2
6	(United States) K Horvath	6	6
4	(United States) B Gadusek	7	6
(United States) J Klitch	5	2
(Italy) F Bonsignori	2	0
7	(West Germany) S Hanika	6	6

Quarterfinals
1	(United States) M Navratilova	7	6
6	(United States) K Horvath	6	2
4	(United States) B Gadusek	6	6
7	(West Germany) S Hanika	1	2

Semifinals
1	(United States) M Navratilova	6	6
4	(United States) B Gadusek	3	1

=== Bottom half ===
First round
8	(Romania) V Ruzici	6	6
(South Africa) E Reinach	2	2
(United States) L Bonder	6	6
(Sweden) C Lindqvist	4	2
(Australia) K Stewart-Smith	6	3	5
(South Africa) J Mundel	4	6	7
5	(Hungary) A Temesvári	6	6
(Australia) E Smylie	2	3
(South Africa) R Fairbank	0	0
(Denmark) T Scheuer-Larsen	6	6
(Peru) L Gildemeister	4	6	6
(United States) A Leand	6	0	0

Second round
8	(Romania) V Ruzici	1	6	4
(United States) L Bonder	6	1	6
(South Africa) J Mundel	3	2
3	(United Kingdom) J Durie	6	6
5	(Hungary) A Temesvári	6	6
(Denmark) T Scheuer-Larsen	2	4
(Peru) L Gildemeister	7	6
2	(Czechoslovakia) H Mandlíková	5	3

Quarterfinals
(United States) L Bonder	6	6
3	(United Kingdom) J Durie	2	4
5	(Hungary) A Temesvári	6	3	2
(Peru) L Gildemeister	4	6	6

Semifinals
(United States) L Bonder	6	2	6
(Peru) L Gildemeister	1	6	7
