= 1983 United Airlines Tournament of Champions – Doubles =

Doubles
- 1983 United Airlines Tournament of Champions
- 1982 Champions: (United States) Rosemary Casals (Australia) Wendy Turnbull

Final
- Champions: (United States) Billie Jean King (United States) Anne Smith
- Runners-up: (United States) Martina Navratilova (United States) Pam Shriver
- Score: 6–3, 1–6, 7–6

Details
- Draw: 8
- Seeds: 4

Events
Singles	Doubles
← 1982 ·	United Airlines Tournament of Champions	· 1984 →

Rosemary Casals and Wendy Turnbull were the defending champions but lost in the semifinals to Billie Jean King and Anne Smith.

King and Smith won in the final 6–3, 1–6, 7–6 against Martina Navratilova and Pam Shriver.

== Seeds ==
Champion seeds are indicated in bold text while text in italics indicates the round in which those seeds were eliminated.

1. (United States) Martina Navratilova / (United States) Pam Shriver (final)
2. (United States) Rosemary Casals / (Australia) Wendy Turnbull (semifinals)
3. (United States) Barbara Potter / (United States) Sharon Walsh (semifinals)
4. (United States) **Billie Jean King** / (United States) **Anne Smith (champions)**

== Draw ==
=== Key ===
- Q = Qualifier
- WC = Wild card
- LL = Lucky loser
- Alt = Alternate
- SE = Special exempt
- PR = Protected ranking
- ITF = ITF entry
- JE = Junior exempt
- w/o = Walkover
- r = Retired
- d = Defaulted
- SR = Special ranking

Quarterfinals
1	(United States) **Martina Navratilova** (United States) **Pam Shriver**	**6**	**6**
(South Africa) Rosalyn Fairbank (United States) Candy Reynolds	2	3
3	(United States) **Barbara Potter** (United States) **Sharon Walsh**	**6**	3	**6**
(United States) Kathleen Horvath (South Africa) Yvonne Vermaak	2	**6**	3
(United States) Andrea Jaeger (United States) Mary Lou Piatek	**6**	6	6
4	(United States) **Billie Jean King** (United States) **Anne Smith**	3	**7**	**7**
(United States) Ann Kiyomura (United States) Paula Smith	4	4
2	(United States) **Rosemary Casals** (Australia) **Wendy Turnbull**	**6**	**6**

Semifinals
1	(United States) **Martina Navratilova** (United States) **Pam Shriver**	**6**	**6**
3	(United States) Barbara Potter (United States) Sharon Walsh	4	3
4	(United States) **Billie Jean King** (United States) **Anne Smith**	**6**	**6**
2	(United States) Rosemary Casals (Australia) Wendy Turnbull	4	1

Final
1	(United States) Martina Navratilova (United States) Pam Shriver	3	**6**	6
4	(United States) **Billie Jean King** (United States) **Anne Smith**	**6**	1	**7**
