= 1980 United Airlines Sunbird Cup =

Women's tennis tournament

- Date: April 29 – May 4
- Edition: 1st
- Category: Colgate Series (AAAA)
- Draw: 21S
- Prize money: $200,000
- Surface: Hard / outdoor
- Location: Haines City, Florida, U.S.
- Venue: Grenelefe Golf & Tennis Resort
- Attendance: 12,500

Champions

Singles
- (United States) Martina Navratilova
Tournament of Champions	· 1981 →

The 1980 United Airlines Sunbird Cup, also known as the United Airlines Tournament of Champions, was a women's tennis tournament played on outdoor hard courts at the Grenelefe Golf & Tennis Resort in Haines City, Florida in the United States. It was part of the Colgate Series circuit of the 1980 WTA Tour and classified as a category AAAA (Note: Tournaments with prize money of $200,000 or higher) event. It was the inaugural edition of the tournament and was held from April 29 through May 4, 1980. Only a singles competition was held for which players qualified who had won a WTA tournament with more than $20,000 prize money during the previous year. First-seeded Martina Navratilova won the title at the event and earned $50,000 first-prize money.

== Finals ==
=== Singles ===
(United States) Martina Navratilova defeated (United States) Tracy Austin 6–2, 6–2

- It was Navratilova's 8th singles title of the year and the 42nd of her career.

== Prize money ==
Event	W	F	3rd	4th	QF	Round of 16	Round of 32
Singles	$50,000	$25,000	$16,000	$13,000	$8,000	$5,000	$3,000
