= 1981 United Airlines Tournament of Champions =

- Date: April 28 – May 3
- Edition: 2nd
- Category: Category 7
- Draw: 27S / 4D
- Prize money: $200,000
- Surface: Hard / outdoor
- Location: Haines City, Florida, U.S.
- Venue: Grenelefe Golf & Tennis Resort

Champions

Singles
- (United States) Martina Navratilova

Doubles
- (United States) Martina Navratilova / (United States) Pam Shriver
← 1980 ·	Tournament of Champions	· 1982 →

The 1981 United Airlines Tournament of Champions was a women's tennis tournament played on outdoor hard courts at the Grenelefe Golf & Tennis Resort in Haines City, Florida in the United States. It was part of the Toyota International Series circuit of the 1981 WTA Tour and classified as a Category 7 (Note: Tournaments with prize money of $200,000 or higher) event. It was the second edition of the tournament and was held from April 28 through May 3, 1981. First-seeded Martina Navratilova won her second consecutive singles title at the event and earned $50,000 first-prize money.

== Finals ==
=== Singles ===
(United States) Martina Navratilova defeated (United States) Pam Casale 6–2, 6–2

- It was Navratilova's 6th singles title of the year and the 51st of her career.

=== Doubles ===
(United States) Martina Navratilova / (United States) Pam Shriver defeated (United States) Rosie Casals / (Australia) Wendy Turnbull 6–2, 6–1

== Prize money ==
Event	W	F	3rd	4th	QF	Round of 16	Round of 32
Singles	$50,000	$26,000	$15,000	$11,000	$6,400	$3,200	$1,800
