= 1983 United Airlines Tournament of Champions =

- Date: April 18 – 24
- Edition: 4th
- Draw: 22S / 8S
- Prize money: $200,000
- Surface: Hard/ outdoors
- Location: Orlando, Florida, U.S.
- Venue: Grenelefe Golf & Tennis Resort

Champions

Singles
- (United States) Martina Navratilova

Doubles
- (United States) Billie Jean King / (United States) Anne Smith
← 1982 ·	Tournament of Champions	· 1984 →

The 1983 United Airlines Tournament of Champions was a women's tennis tournament played on outdoor hard courts at the Grenelefe Golf & Tennis Resort in Haines City, Florida in the United States that was part of the 1983 Virginia Slims World Championship Series. It was the fourth edition of the tournament and was held from April 18 through April 24, 1983. First-seeded Martina Navratilova won her fourth consecutive singles title at the event and earned $50,000 first-prize money.

== Finals ==
=== Singles ===
(United States) Martina Navratilova defeated (United States) Andrea Jaeger 6–1, 7–5

- It was Navratilova's 7th title of the year and the 77th of her career.

=== Doubles ===
(United States) Billie Jean King / (United States) Anne Smith defeated (United States) Martina Navratilova / (United States) Pam Shriver 6–3, 1–6, 7–6^{(11–9)}

- It was King's 2nd title of the year and the 168th of her career. It was Smith's only title of the year and the 24th of her career.
