= 1983 United Airlines Tournament of Champions – Singles =

Singles
- 1983 United Airlines Tournament of Champions
- 1982 Champion: (United States) Martina Navratilova

Final
- Champion: (United States) Martina Navratilova
- Runner-up: (United States) Andrea Jaeger
- Score: 6–1, 7–5

Events
Singles	Doubles
← 1982 ·	United Airlines Tournament of Champions	· 1984 →

Martina Navratilova was the defending champion and won in the final 6–1, 7–5 against Andrea Jaeger.

== Seeds ==
A champion seed is indicated in bold text while text in italics indicates the round in which that seed was eliminated. All eight seeds received a bye to the second round.

1. (United States) **Martina Navratilova (champion)**
2. (United States) Andrea Jaeger (final)
3. (Australia) Wendy Turnbull (semifinals)
4. (Czechoslovakia) Hana Mandlíková (semifinals)
5. (United States) Billie Jean King (quarterfinals)
6. (Romania) Virginia Ruzici (quarterfinals)
7. (United States) Barbara Potter (quarterfinals)
8. (South Africa) Yvonne Vermaak (quarterfinals)

== Draw ==
=== Key ===
- Q = Qualifier
- WC = Wild card
- LL = Lucky loser
- Alt = Alternate
- SE = Special exempt
- PR = Protected ranking
- ITF = ITF entry
- JE = Junior exempt
- w/o = Walkover
- r = Retired
- d = Defaulted
- SR = Special ranking

=== Final ===
Final
1	(United States) **Martina Navratilova**	**6**	**7**
2	(United States) Andrea Jaeger	1	5

=== Section 1 ===
First round
(United States) L Bonder	4	2
(Sweden) **C Jexell**	**6**	**6**
(Sweden) B Björk	3	3
(Peru) **L Arraya**	**6**	**6**
(United States) **A Moulton**	**w/o**
(United States) L-A Thompson

Second round
1	(United States) **M Navratilova**	**6**	**6**
(United Kingdom) A Hobbs	4	0
(Sweden) C Jexell	2	6
8	(South Africa) **Y Vermaak**	**6**	**7**
4	(Czechoslovakia) **H Mandlíková**	5	**6**	**6**
(Peru) L Arraya	**7**	4	1
(United States) A Moulton	2	3
5	(United States) **B J King**	**6**	**6**

Quarterfinals
1	(United States) **M Navratilova**	**6**	**6**
8	(South Africa) Y Vermaak	0	1
4	(Czechoslovakia) **H Mandlíková**	**6**	2	**7**
5	(United States) B J King	3	**6**	5

Semifinals
1	(United States) **M Navratilova**	4	**6**	**7**
4	(Czechoslovakia) H Mandlíková	**6**	2	5

=== Section 2 ===
First round
(United Kingdom) **R Einy**	4	**6**	**6**
(Sweden) L Sandin	**6**	4	4
(United States) **K Horvath**	**w/o**
(Canada) C Bassett
(Australia) **E Sayers**	6	**6**	**6**
(United States) G Purdy	**7**	3	2

Second round
7	(United States) **B Potter**	**6**	**7**
(United States) L Allen	4	6
(United Kingdom) R Einy	0	3
3	(Australia) **W Turnbull**	**6**	**6**
6	(Romania) **V Ruzici**	**6**	**6**
(United States) K Horvath	4	1
(Australia) E Sayers	1	1
2	(United States) **A Jaeger**	**6**	**6**

Quarterfinals
7	(United States) B Potter	**6**	4	6
3	(Australia) **W Turnbull**	3	**6**	**7**
6	(Romania) V Ruzici	4	2
2	(United States) **A Jaeger**	**6**	**6**

Semifinals
3	(Australia) W Turnbull	3	**6**	2
2	(United States) **A Jaeger**	**6**	2	**6**
