= Tower Lake =

- Location within Florida
- Location: Polk County, Florida
- Coordinates: 28.1345°N 81.6359°W
- Lake type: natural freshwater lake
- Basin countries: United States
- Max. length: 2,450 ft (747 m)
- Max. width: 1,780 ft (543 m)
- Surface area: 66.41 acres (27 ha)
- Surface elevation: 128 ft (39 m)
- Settlements: Haines City, Florida, Blue Heron Bay residential community, Calabay Park gated community

Tower Lake is a natural freshwater lake located on the north edge of Haines City, Florida. All references to it but one have it named as Tower Lake. In the Wikimapia website, it is called Lake Tower. This lake has a 66.41-acre (268,800 m^{2}) surface area. On the west it is bordered by Highway US 27, on the southwest by vacant land, on the southeast by Osprey Drive (which is part of the Blue Heron Bay residential community), on the northeast by the Calabay Park gated community and on the north by Bates Road. The southeast section of Tower Lake is inside the city limits of Haines City.

Tower Lake has no public areas where boats can be launched. Calabay Park has a private boat ramp that cannot be accessed by the general public. This lake has no public swimming area. It can be fished by boat or from the shore along a large part of the north side, along the entire west side and along the southeast. The Hook and Bullet website says Tower Lake contains warmouth, crappie and gar.
