= Haines City MPS =

- U.S. National Register of Historic Places
- Location within Florida Location within the United States
- Location: Haines City, Florida
- MPS: Historic and Architectural Resources of Haines City
- NRHP reference No.: 64500108

The following buildings were added to the National Register of Historic Places as part of the Haines City Multiple Property Submission (or MPS).

Resource Name	Also known as	Address	City	Added
Old Central Grammar School		801 Ledwith Avenue	Haines City	March 17, 1994
Downtown Haines City Commercial District		Roughly bounded by Hinson and Ingraham Avenues, and 4th and 7th Streets	Haines City	March 7, 1994
Old Haines City National Guard Armory		226 South 6th Street	Haines City	March 2, 1994
Polk Hotel		800-810 Hinson Avenue	Haines City	March 17, 1994
St. Mark's Episcopal Church		102 North 9th Street	Haines City	March 17, 1994
