= Downtown Haines City Commercial District =

Historic district in Florida, United States

- U.S. National Register of Historic Places
- U.S. Historic district
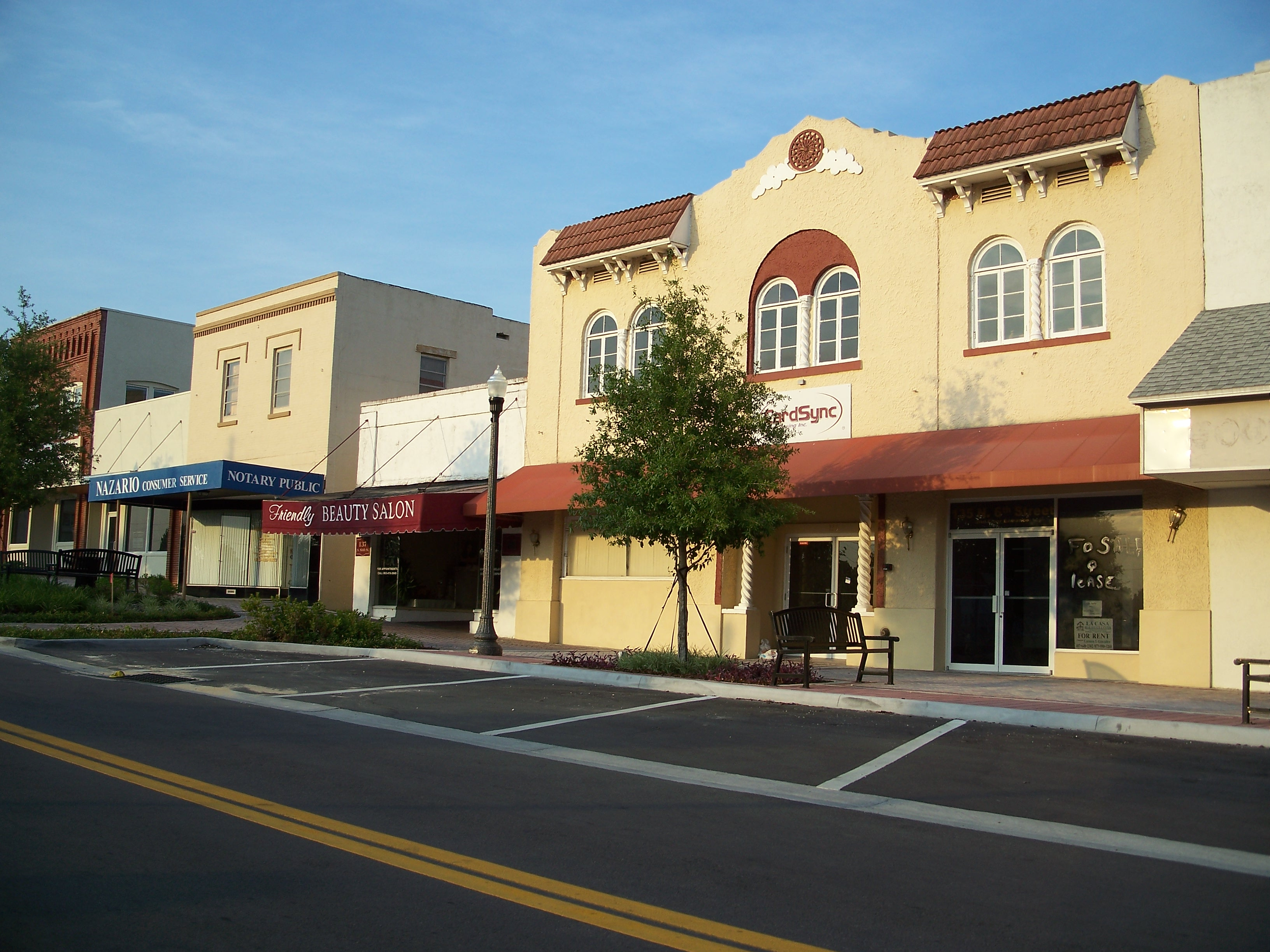

- Location within Florida Location within the United States
- Location: Haines City, Florida
- Coordinates: 28°6′28″N 81°37′37″W
- Area: 120 acres (0.49 km^{2})
- MPS: Haines City MPS
- NRHP reference No.: 94000150
- Added to NRHP: March 7, 1994

The Downtown Haines City Commercial District is a U.S. historic district (designated as such on March 7, 1994) located in Haines City, Florida. The district is bounded by Hinson and Ingraham Avenues, and 4th and 7th Streets. It contains 20 historic buildings.

== Gallery ==
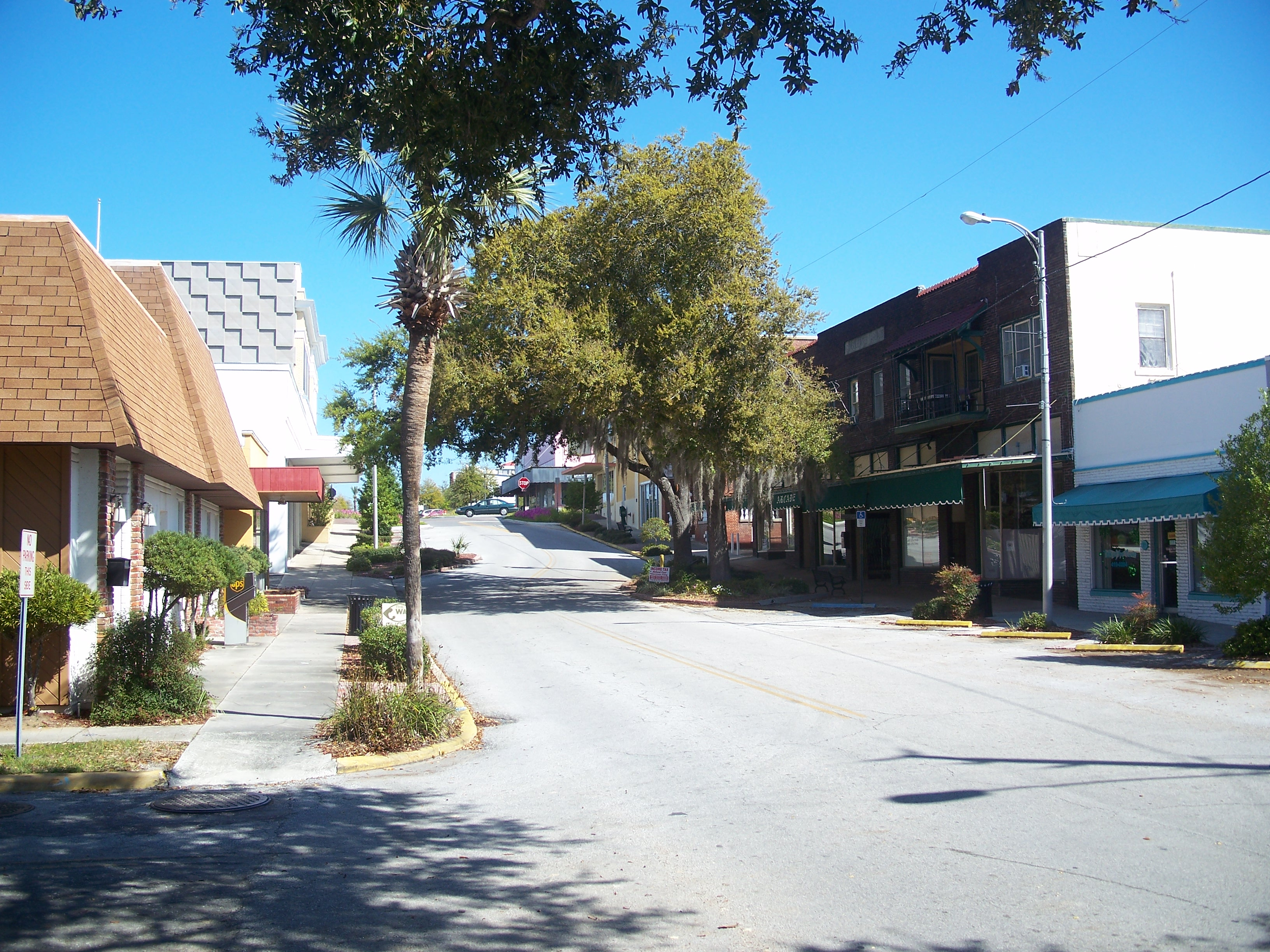

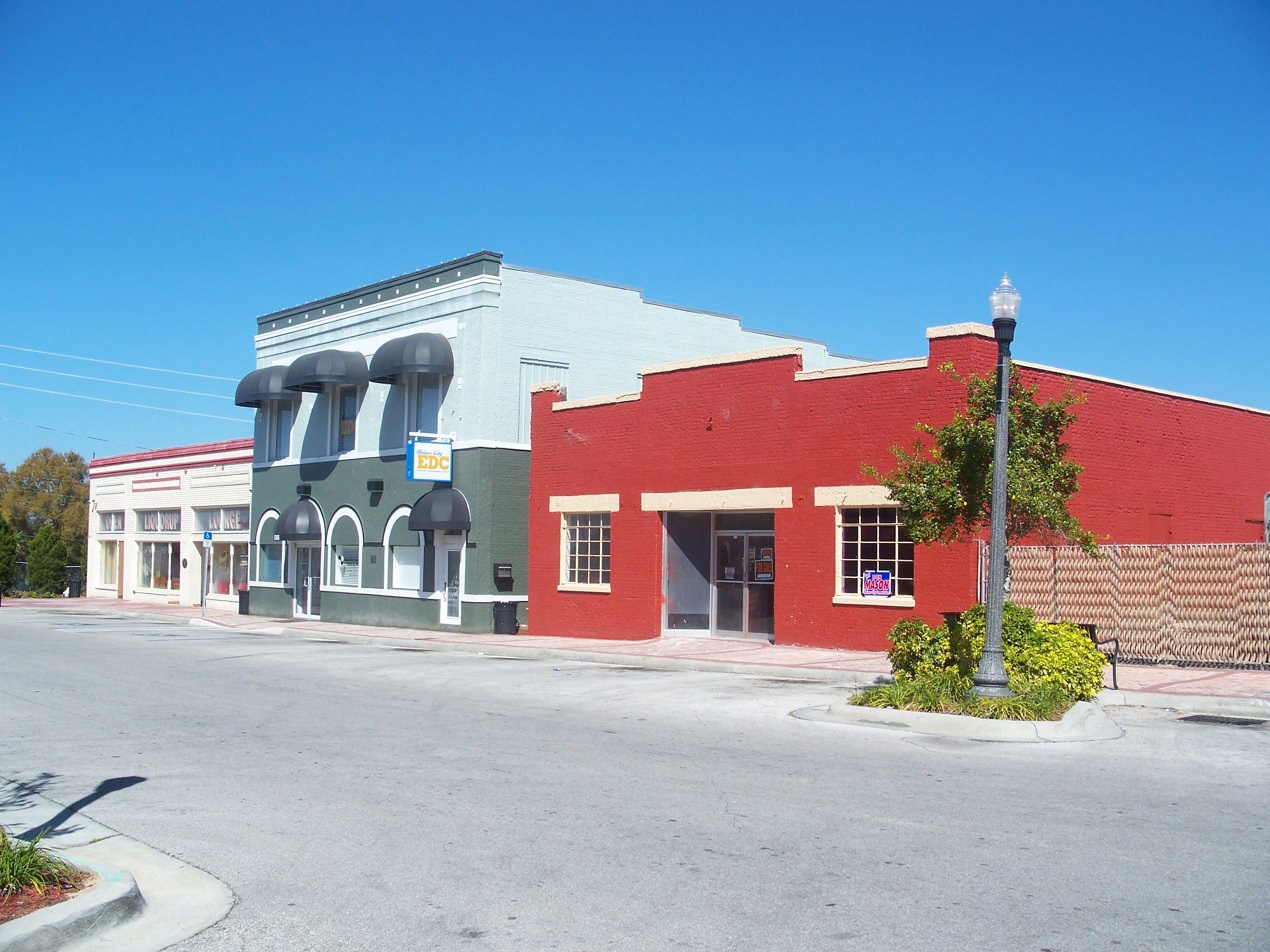

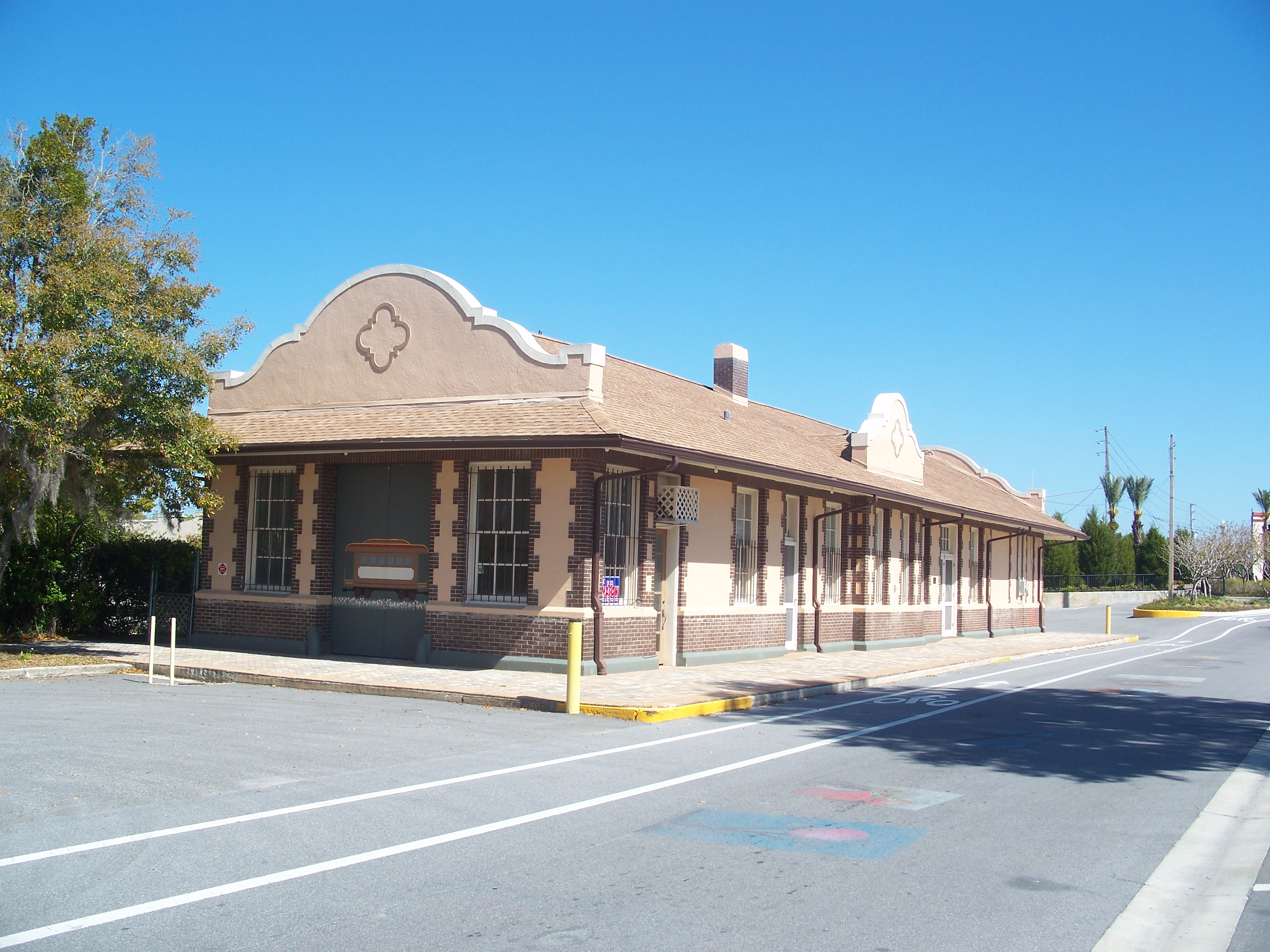

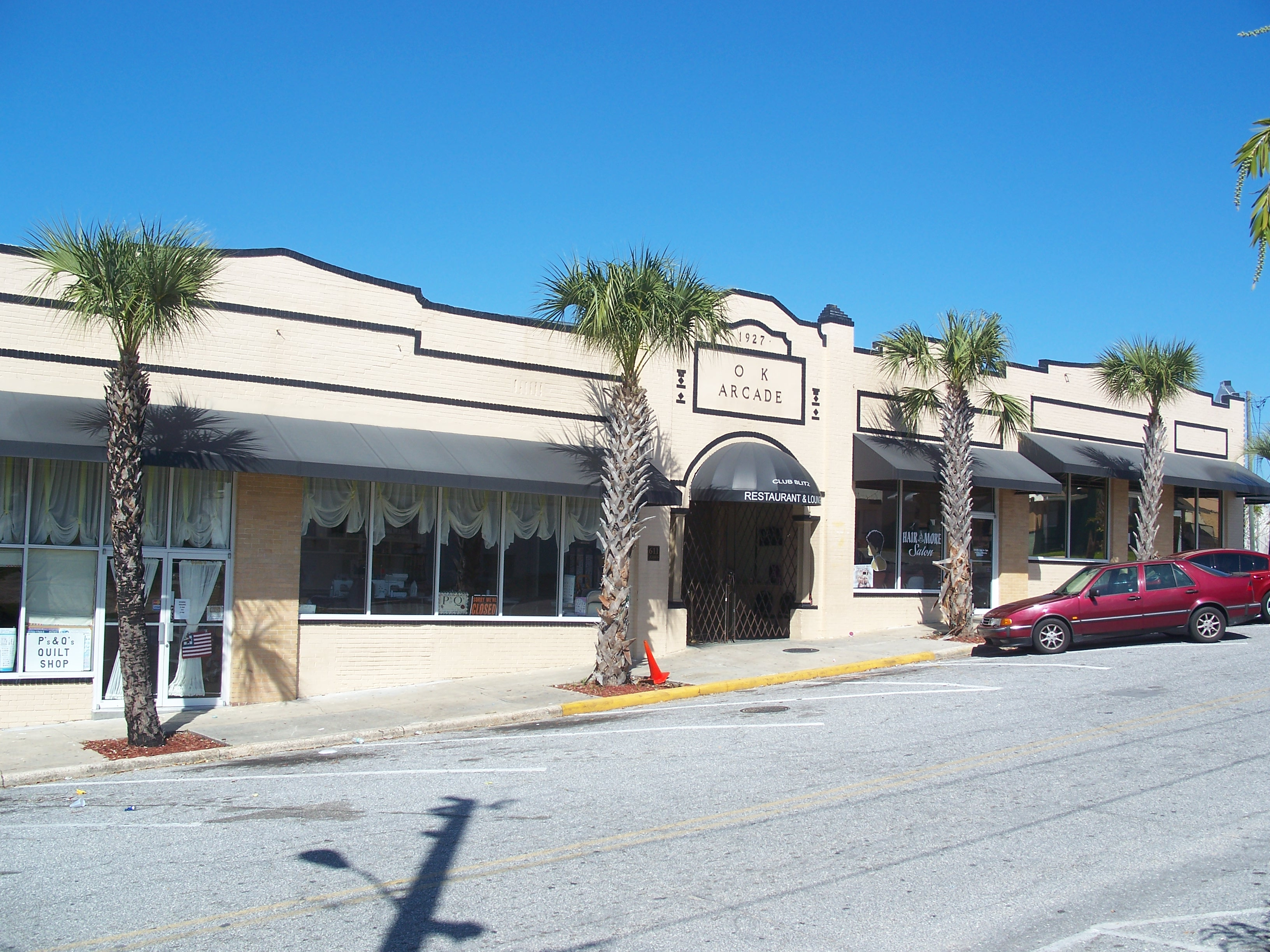

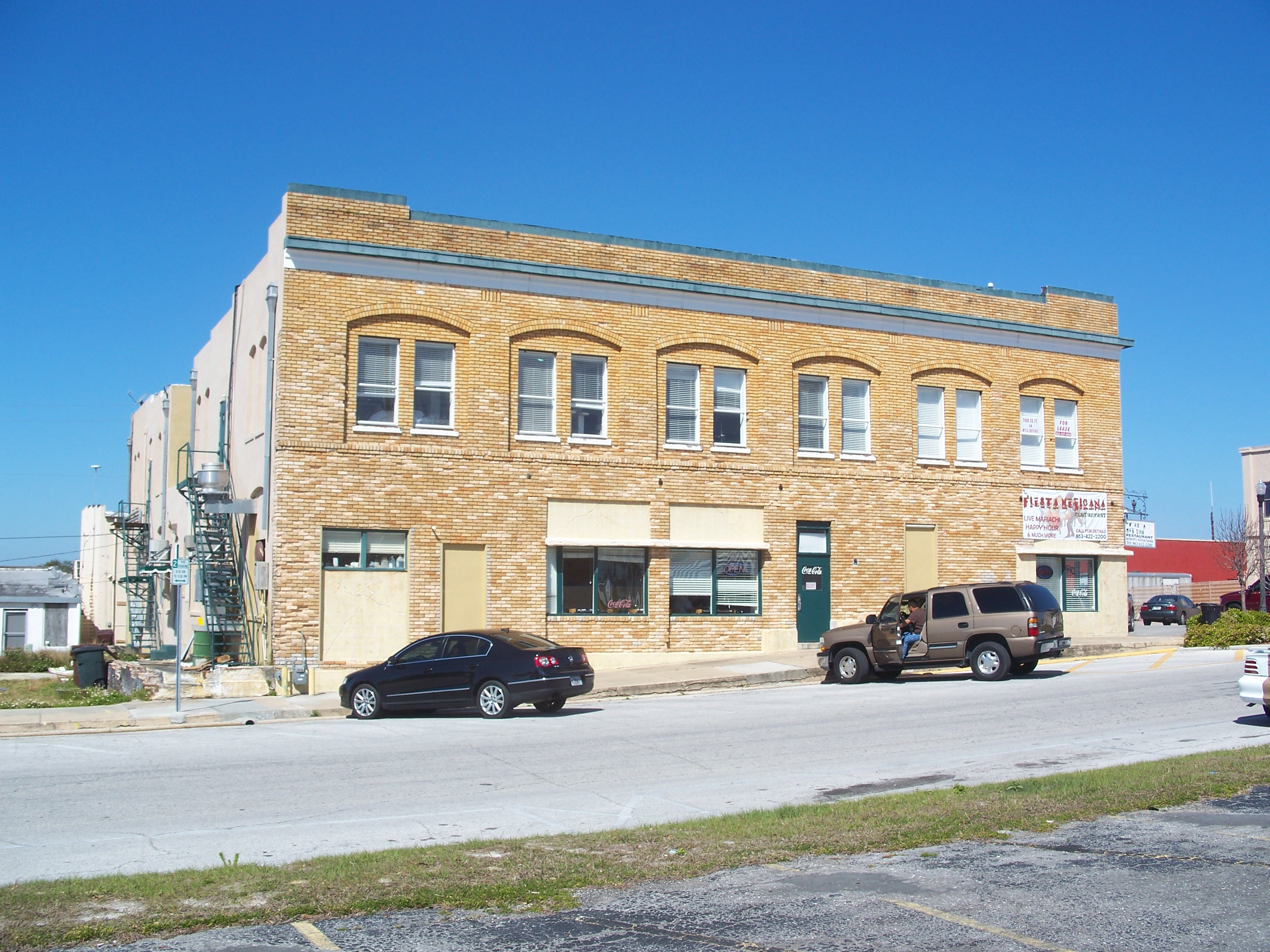
