= Old Haines City National Guard Armory =

- U.S. National Register of Historic Places
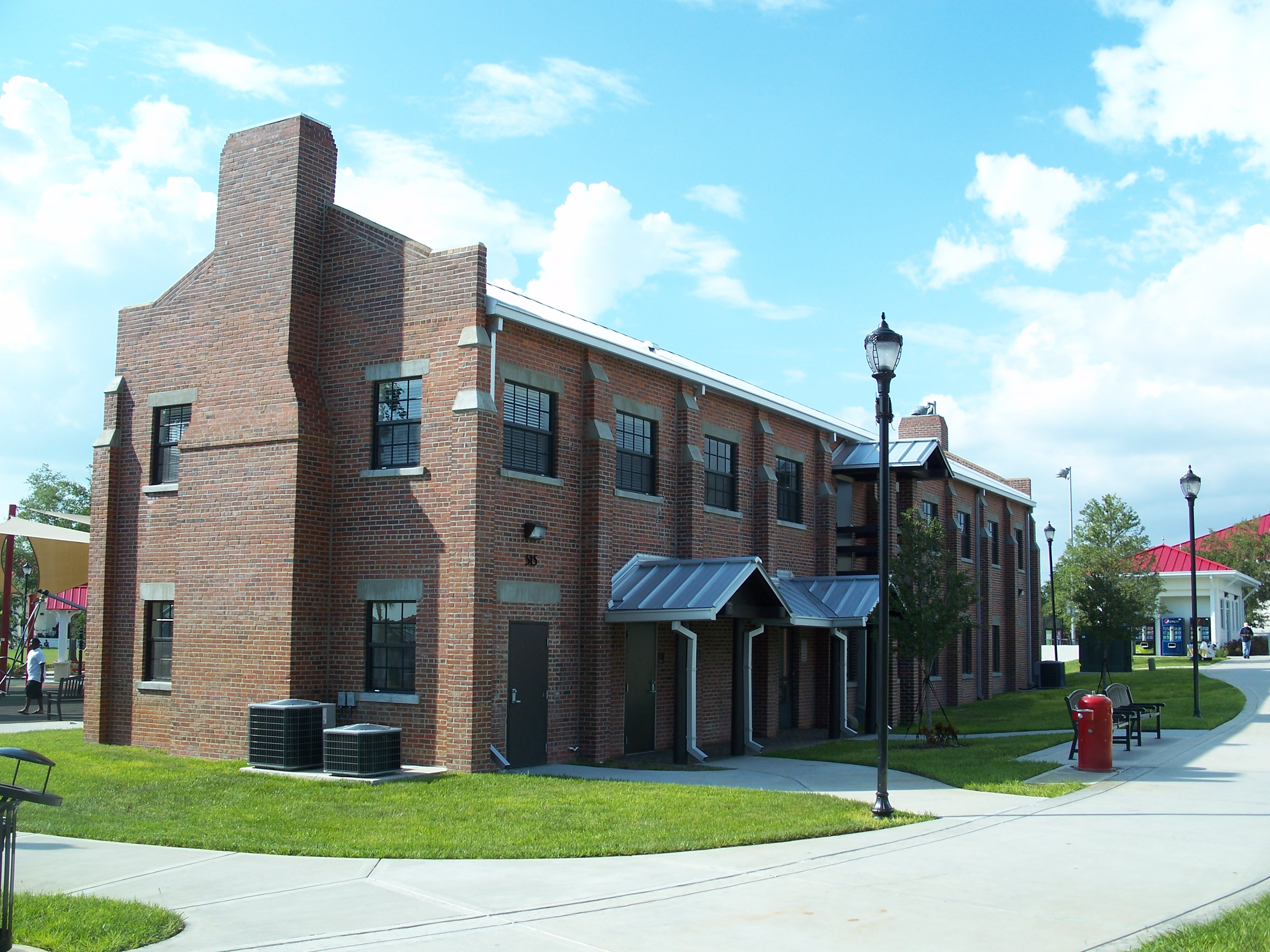

- Location within Florida Location within the United States
- Location: Haines City, Florida
- Coordinates: 28°6′8″N 81°37′37″W
- Architectural style: Colonial Revival
- MPS: Haines City MPS
- NRHP reference No.: 94000158
- Added to NRHP: March 2, 1994

The Old Haines City National Guard Armory (also known as the Community Center of Northeast Polk County, Inc.) is a historic site in Haines City, Florida. It is located at 226 South 6th Street. On March 2, 1994, it was added to the U.S. National Register of Historic Places.

== History ==
In 1927 the government of Haines City. As an attempt to encourage growth within the community made a deal with the Florida National Guard to add a unit to the community. The city designated property south of the downtown for the national guard unit and started construction on the site. It was finished by 1928 and was used for tear gas and ammunition training. In 1930 another unit was constructed, this time as a medical department and was used for medical field operations. However, On January 2, 1932. The national guard unit caught fire, no lives were lost but over 10,000 dollars worth of property, stores, & supplies were consumed by the blaze. Immediately after the incident the government of Haines City sought to rebuild the facility, building a brand new armory building by October, 1932 for the cost of 10,000 dollars. Later in 1934, the Haines City government took advantage of New Deal Funds by building a vehicle store building for the unit. Thanks for WPA Funds, the building was completed by 1935. Later during WW2 the national guard unit was federalized and was used as a training facility for Camp Blanding. After the war, the unit was given back to the Florida National Guard who continued to use it until 1983 when they moved into a bigger facility west of US 27 which they continue to use today.

The site was eventually redeveloped in the late 2000’s, early 2010’s as Lake Eva Community Park. A public space that uses some historical national guard buildings as decor.

== Hurricane ==
During the 2004 Atlantic Hurricane Season when Hurricane Charley hit Haines City it ended up knocking down the west wall of the Vehicle Storage Building forcing it to have to get demolished.
