= 1985 Chrysler Tournament of Champions – Singles =

Singles
- 1985 Chrysler Tournament of Champions

Final
- Champion: (United States) Martina Navratilova
- Runner-up: (Bulgaria) Katerina Maleeva
- Score: 6–1, 6–0

Details
- Draw: 24
- Seeds: 8

Events
Singles	Doubles
- United Airlines Tournament of Champions

Martina Navratilova won her sixth consecutive tournament at Orlando, by defeating Katerina Maleeva 6–1, 6–0 in the final.

== Seeds ==
All seeds received a bye to the second round.

1. (United States) Martina Navratilova (champion)
2. (Bulgaria) Manuela Maleeva (quarterfinals)
3. (West Germany) Claudia Kohde-Kilsch (semifinals)
4. (United States) Pam Shriver (second round)
5. (Sweden) Catarina Lindqvist (quarterfinals)
6. (United States) Bonnie Gadusek (semifinals)
7. (United States) Peanut Louie (second round)
8. (West Germany) Sylvia Hanika (second round, withdrew)

== Draw ==
Key

- Q = Qualifier
- WC = Wild card
- LL = Lucky loser
- Alt = Alternate
- ITF = ITF entry
- PR = Protected ranking
- SR = Special ranking
- SE = Special exempt
- JE = Junior exempt
- JR = Junior Accelerator Programme entrant
- CO = College Accelerator Programme entrant
- NG = Next Gen Accelerator Program entrant
- w/o = Walkover
- r = Retired
- d = Defaulted

=== Finals ===
Semifinals
1	(United States) Martina Navratilova	6	6
3	(West Germany) Claudia Kohde-Kilsch	2	1
(Bulgaria) Katerina Maleeva	6	6
6	(United States) Bonnie Gadusek	1	4

Final
1	(United States) Martina Navratilova	6	6
(Bulgaria) Katerina Maleeva	1	0

=== Top half ===
First round
(Czechoslovakia) R Maršíková	6	1
(United States) K Horvath	7	6
(United States) D Spence	6	6
(Greece) O Tsarbopoulou	2	1
(Socialist Federal Republic of Yugoslavia) R Šašak	6	6
(United States) J Russell	4	1
(United States) M Torres	5	6	6
(Spain) Michelle Garth	7	3	1

Second round
1	(United States) M Navratilova	6	6
(United States) K Horvath	4	1
(United States) D Spence	w/o
8	(West Germany) S Hanika
3	(West Germany) C Kohde-Kilsch	6	6
(Socialist Federal Republic of Yugoslavia) R Šašak	4	3
(United States) M Torres	6	4
5	(Sweden) C Lindqvist	7	6

Quarterfinals
1	(United States) M Navratilova	6	6
(United States) D Spence	1	4
3	(West Germany) C Kohde-Kilsch	3	6	6
5	(Sweden) C Lindqvist	6	1	2

Semifinals
1	(United States) M Navratilova	6	6
3	(West Germany) C Kohde-Kilsch	2	1

=== Bottom half ===
First round
(Argentina) M Paz	6	6	2
(Italy) S Cecchini	4	7	6
(Bulgaria) K Maleeva	6	6
(Brazil) N Dias	1	2
(South Africa) Y Vermaak	6	3	6
(Switzerland) L Drescher	2	6	2
(Czechoslovakia) O Votavová	3	6	6
(Japan) E Inoue	6	3	7

Second round
7	(United States) P Louie	1	6	3
(Italy) S Cecchini	6	2	6
(Bulgaria) K Maleeva	7	3	6
4	(United States) P Shriver	6	6	4
6	(United States) B Gadusek	6	6
(South Africa) Y Vermaak	0	4
(Japan) E Inoue	2	1
2	(Bulgaria) M Maleeva	6	6

Quarterfinals
(Italy) S Cecchini	2	2
(Bulgaria) K Maleeva	6	6
6	(United States) B Gadusek	6	6
2	(Bulgaria) M Maleeva	4	2

Semifinals
(Bulgaria) K Maleeva	6	6
6	(United States) B Gadusek	1	4
