= 1985 Chrysler Tournament of Champions – Doubles =

Doubles
- 1985 Chrysler Tournament of Champions

Final
- Champion: (United States) Martina Navratilova (United States) Pam Shriver
- Runner-up: (United States) Elise Burgin (United States) Kathleen Horvath
- Score: 6–3, 6–1

Details
- Draw: 6
- Seeds: 4

Events
Singles	Doubles
- United Airlines Tournament of Champions

Claudia Kohde-Kilsch and Hana Mandlíková were the defending champions, but were forced to withdraw before their semifinals match.

Martina Navratilova and Pam Shriver won the title by defeating Elise Burgin and Kathleen Horvath 6–3, 6–1 in the final.

== Seeds ==
The first two seeds received a bye to the semifinals.

1. (United States) Martina Navratilova / (United States) Pam Shriver (champions)
2. (West Germany) Claudia Kohde-Kilsch / (Czechoslovakia) Hana Mandlíková (semifinals, withdrew)
3. (United States) Elise Burgin / (United States) Kathleen Horvath (final)
4. (Australia) Elizabeth Minter / (United States) JoAnne Russell (first round)

== Draw ==
Key

- Q = Qualifier
- WC = Wild card
- LL = Lucky loser
- Alt = Alternate
- ITF = ITF entry
- PR = Protected ranking
- SR = Special ranking
- SE = Special exempt
- JE = Junior exempt
- JR = Junior Accelerator Programme entrant
- CO = College Accelerator Programme entrant
- NG = Next Gen Accelerator Program entrant
- w/o = Walkover
- r = Retired
- d = Defaulted

=== Draw ===
First round
(United States) Andrea Leand (Hungary) Andrea Temesvári	6	6	6
4	(Australia) Elizabeth Minter (United States) JoAnne Russell	3	7	4
(Canada) Jill Hetherington (Canada) Hélène Pelletier	2	7	1
3	(United States) Elise Burgin (United States) Kathleen Horvath	6	6	6

Semifinals
1	(United States) Martina Navratilova (United States) Pam Shriver	6	6
(United States) Andrea Leand (Hungary) Andrea Temesvári	3	2
3	(United States) Elise Burgin (United States) Kathleen Horvath	w/o
2	(West Germany) Claudia Kohde-Kilsch (Czechoslovakia) Hana Mandlíková

Final
1	(United States) Martina Navratilova (United States) Pam Shriver	6	6
3	(United States) Elise Burgin (United States) Kathleen Horvath	3	1
