= St. Mark's Episcopal Church (Haines City, Florida) =

Historic church in Florida, United States

- U.S. National Register of Historic Places
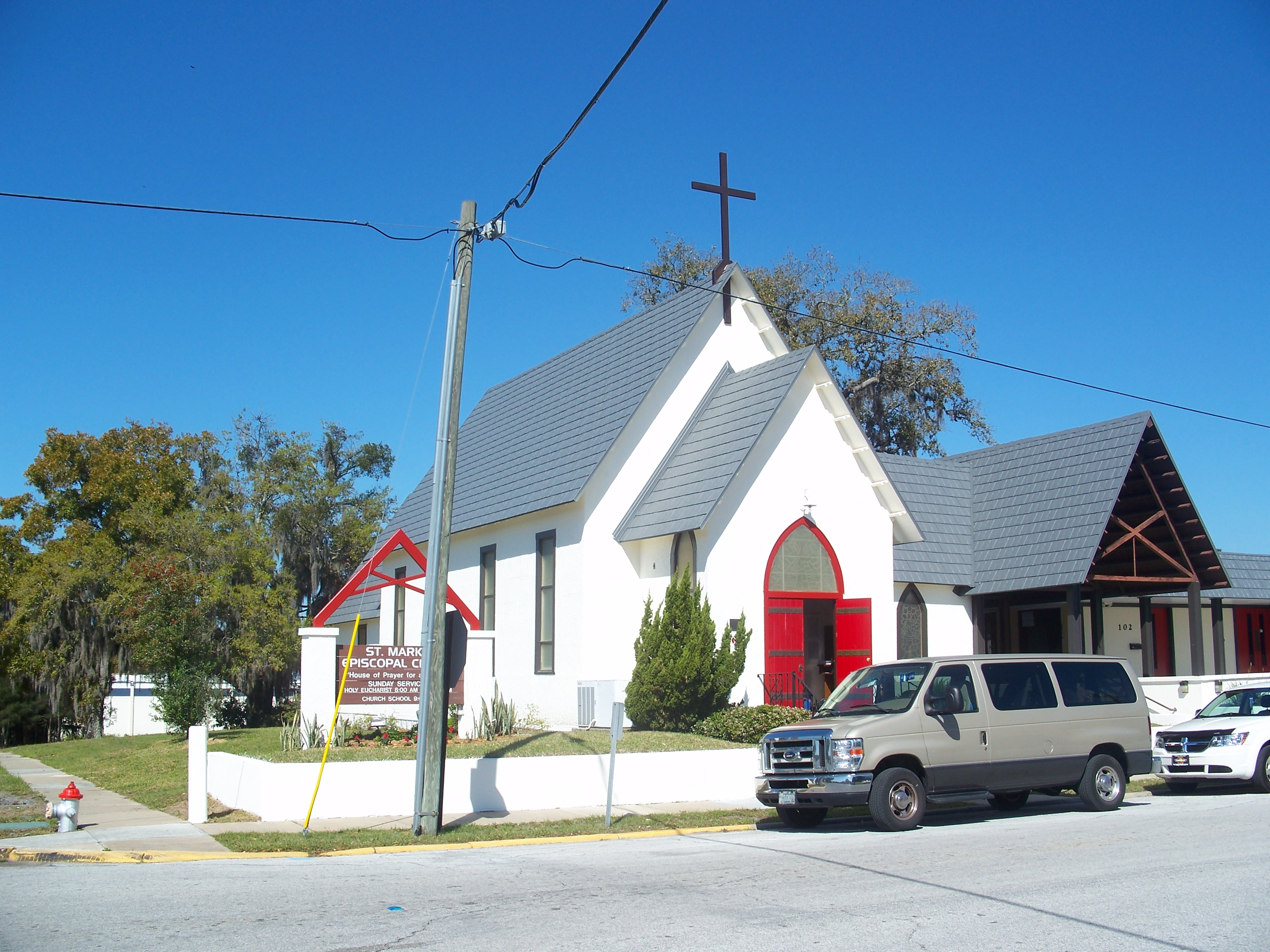

- Location within Florida Location within the United States
- Location: Haines City, Florida
- Coordinates: 28°6′29″N 81°37′30″W
- Built: 1890
- Architectural style: Gothic Revival
- MPS: Haines City MPS
- NRHP reference No.: 94000159
- Added to NRHP: March 17, 1994

St. Mark's Episcopal Church, located at 102 North 9th Street in Haines City, Florida is an historic Carpenter Gothic church. On March 17, 1994, it was added to the U.S. National Register of Historic Places.

== National Register ==
- St. Mark's Episcopal Church
- (added 1994 - Building - #94000159)
- 102 N. 9th St., Haines City
- Historic Significance: Event, Architecture/Engineering
- Architect, builder, or engineer: Unknown
- Architectural Style: Late Gothic Revival
- Area of Significance: Exploration/Settlement, Architecture
- Period of Significance: 1875–1899, 1900–1924, 1925–1949
- Owner: Private
- Historic Function: Religion
- Historic Sub-function: Religious Structure
- Current Function: Religion
- Current Sub-function: Religious Structure

== See also ==
- National Register of Historic Places listings in Florida

== Gallery ==
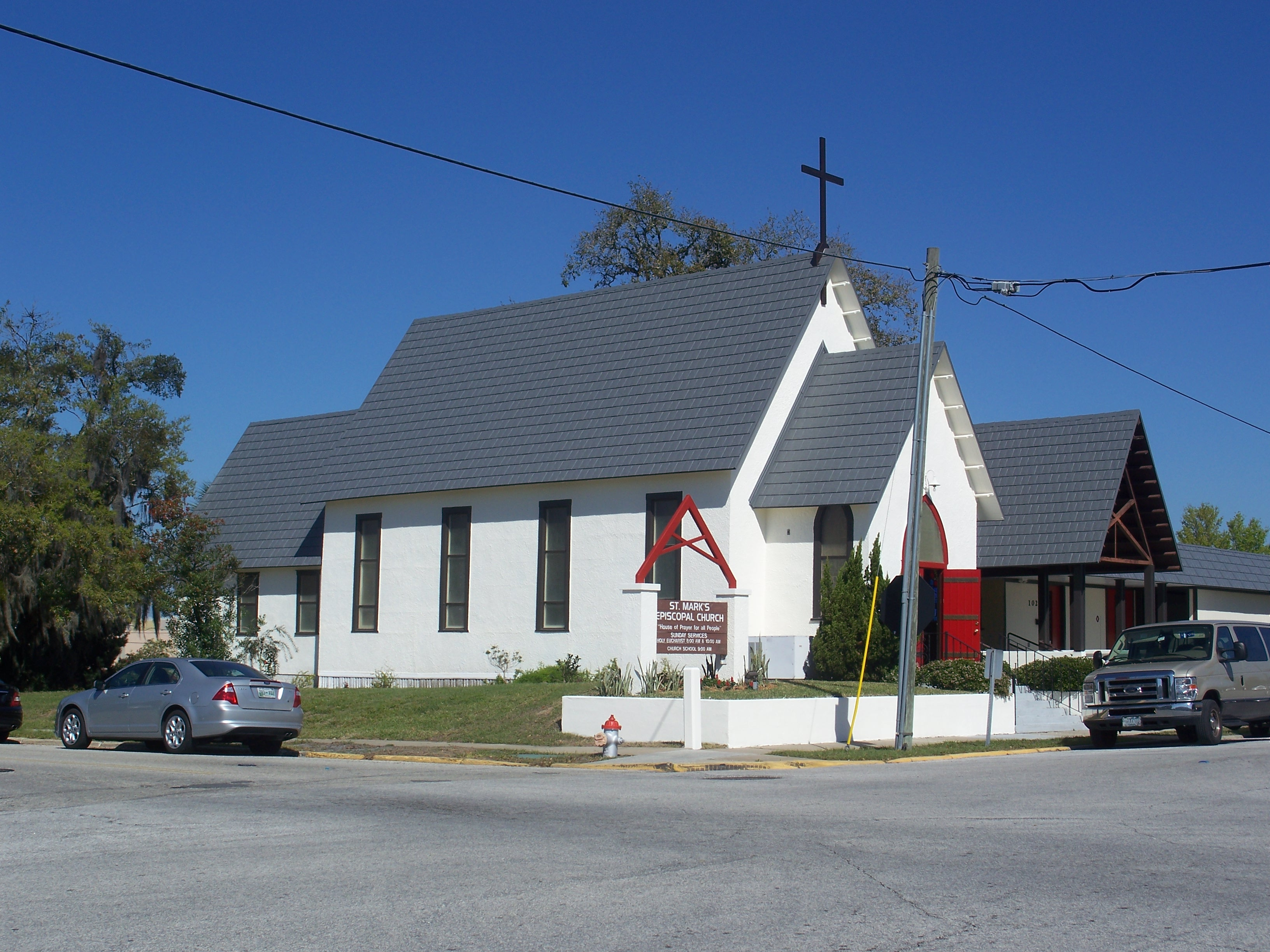

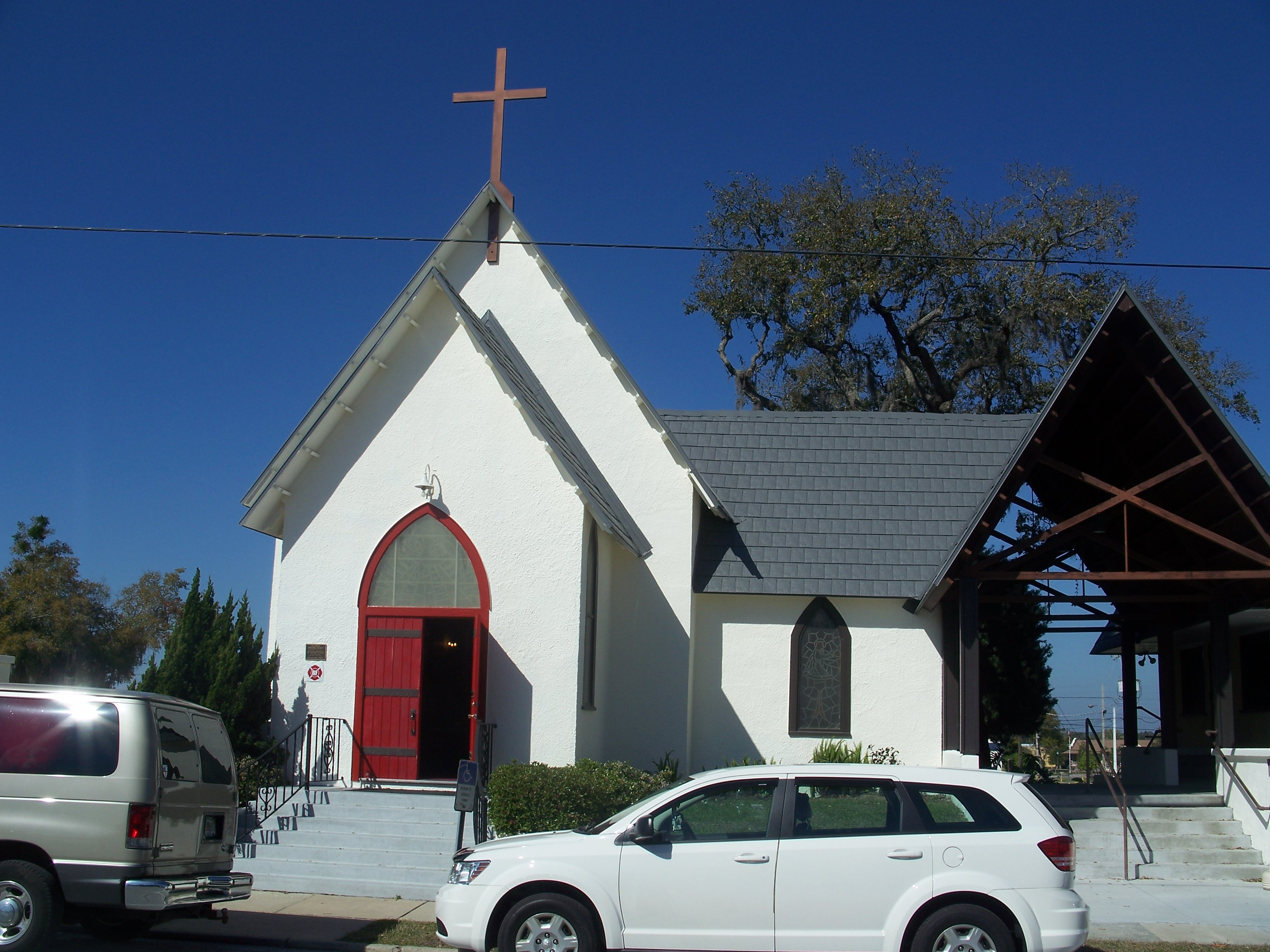
