= Barnett Bank Tennis Classic =

Defunct tennis tournament
- Tour: WTA Tour
- Founded: 1974
- Abolished: 1975
- Editions: 2
- Location: Orlando, Florida, United States
- Surface: Clay (Green)

The Barnett Bank Tennis Classic is a defunct WTA Tour affiliated tennis tournament played in the autumn of 1974 and 1975. It was held in Orlando, Florida in the United States and played on outdoor clay courts. The 1974 edition was part of the Virginia Slims Circuit while the 1975 edition was part of the Women's International Grand Prix circuit.

== Results ==
=== Singles ===
Year	Champions	Runners-up	Score
1974	(Czechoslovakia) Martina Navratilova	(United States) Julie Heldman	7–6^{(5–4)}, 6–4
1975	(United States) Chris Evert	(Czechoslovakia) Martina Navratilova	walkover

=== Doubles ===
Year	Champions	Runners-up	Score
1974	(France) Françoise Dürr (Netherlands) Betty Stöve	(United States) Rosemary Casals (United States) Billie Jean King	6–3, 6–7^{(2–5)}, 6–4
1975	(United States) Rosemary Casals (United States) Wendy Overton	(United States) Chris Evert (Czechoslovakia) Martina Navratilova	walkover

== See also ==
- United Airlines Tournament of Champions – women's tournament in Orlando (1980–1985)
