= 1984 United Airlines Tournament of Champions =

- Date: April 23–29
- Edition: 5th
- Draw: 28S / 7D
- Prize money: $200,000
- Surface: Clay / outdoors
- Location: Orlando, Florida, US
- Venue: Hyatt Regency Grand Cypress

Champions

Singles
- (United States) Martina Navratilova

Doubles
- (West Germany) Claudia Kohde-Kilsch (Czechoslovakia) Hana Mandlíková
← 1983 ·	Tournament of Champions	· 1985 →

The 1984 United Airlines Tournament of Champions was a tennis tournament played on outdoor clay courts at the Hyatt Regency Grand Cypress in Orlando, Florida in the United States that was part of the 1984 Virginia Slims World Championship Series. It was the fifth edition of the tournament and was held from April 23 through April 29, 1984. First-seeded Martina Navratilova won her fifth consecutive singles title at the event.

== Finals ==
=== Singles ===
(United States) Martina Navratilova defeated (Peru) Laura Gildemeister 6–0, 6–1

- It was Navratilova's 4th singles title of the year and the 90th of her career.

=== Doubles ===
(West Germany) Claudia Kohde-Kilsch / (Czechoslovakia) Hana Mandlíková defeated (United Kingdom) Anne Hobbs / (Australia) Wendy Turnbull 6–0, 1–6, 6–3

- It was Kohde-Kilsch's 2nd title of the year and the 8th of her career. It was Mandlíková's 8th title of the year and the 26th of her career.
