= 1982 United Airlines Tournament of Champions =

Women's tennis tournament

- Date: April 26 – May 2
- Edition: 3rd
- Category: Category 7
- Draw: 24S / 8D
- Prize money: $200,000
- Surface: Hard / outdoor
- Location: Haines City, Florida, U.S.
- Venue: Grenelefe Golf & Tennis Resort

Champions

Singles
- (United States) Martina Navratilova

Doubles
- (United States) Rosemary Casals / (Australia) Wendy Turnbull
← 1981 ·	Tournament of Champions	· 1983 →

The 1982 United Airlines Tournament of Champions was a women's tennis tournament played on outdoor hard courts at the Grenelefe Golf & Tennis Resort in Haines City, Florida in the United States. It was part of the Toyota International Series circuit of the 1982 WTA Tour and classified as a Category 7 (Note: Tournaments with prize money of $200,000 or higher) event. It was the third edition of the tournament and was held from April 26 through May 2, 1982. First-seeded Martina Navratilova won her third consecutive singles title at the event and earned $50,000 first-prize money.

== Finals ==
=== Singles ===
(United States) Martina Navratilova defeated (Australia) Wendy Turnbull 6–2, 7–5

- It was Navratilova's 7th singles title of the year and the 62nd of her career.

=== Doubles ===
(United States) Rosemary Casals / (Australia) Wendy Turnbull defeated (United States) Kathy Jordan / (United States) Anne Smith 6–3, 6–3

== Prize money ==
Event	W	F	SF	QF	Round of 16	Round of 32
Singles	$50,000	$25,000	$12,000	$6,000	$3,000	$1,500
