= Polk Hotel =

United States historical building

- U.S. National Register of Historic Places
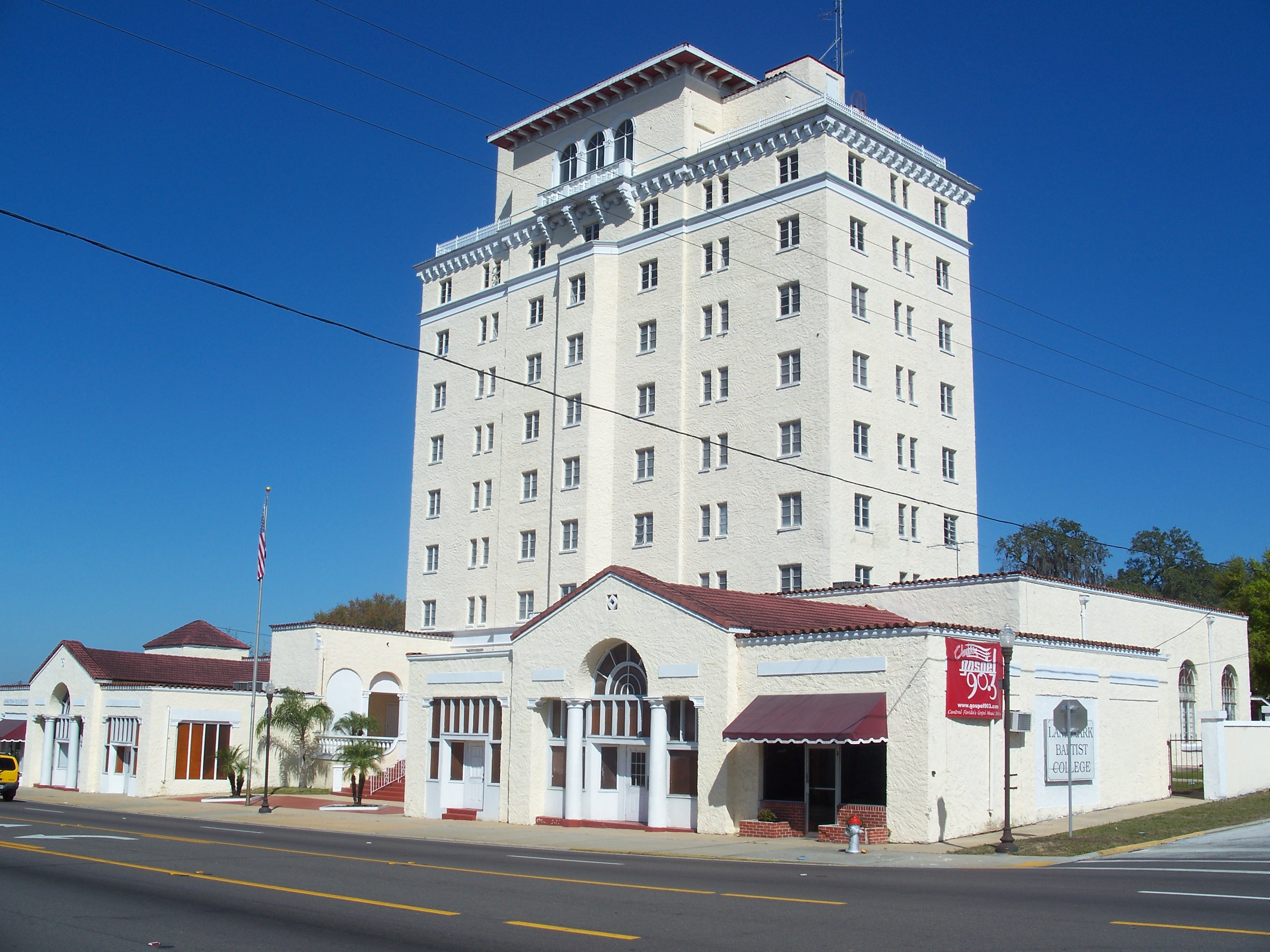

- Location within Florida Location within the United States
- Location: Haines City, Florida
- Coordinates: 28°6′24″N 81°37′27″W
- Architectural style: Italian Renaissance Revival
- MPS: Haines City MPS
- NRHP reference No.: 94000151
- Added to NRHP: March 17, 1994

The Polk Hotel (also known as the Palm Crest Hotel or the Landmark Baptist College) is a historic hotel in the Italian Renaissance Revival style. It is located at 800–810 Hinson Avenue in Haines City, Florida.

On March 17, 1994, it was added to the U.S. National Register of Historic Places.

The "Old Polk Hotel", as it is widely known among local residents, is now home to Landmark Baptist College, a ministry of Landmark Baptist Church. It is also the home of WLVF Gospel 90.3 FM, a Gospel/Bluegrass FM radio station, also affiliated with Landmark Baptist Church.

== Gallery ==
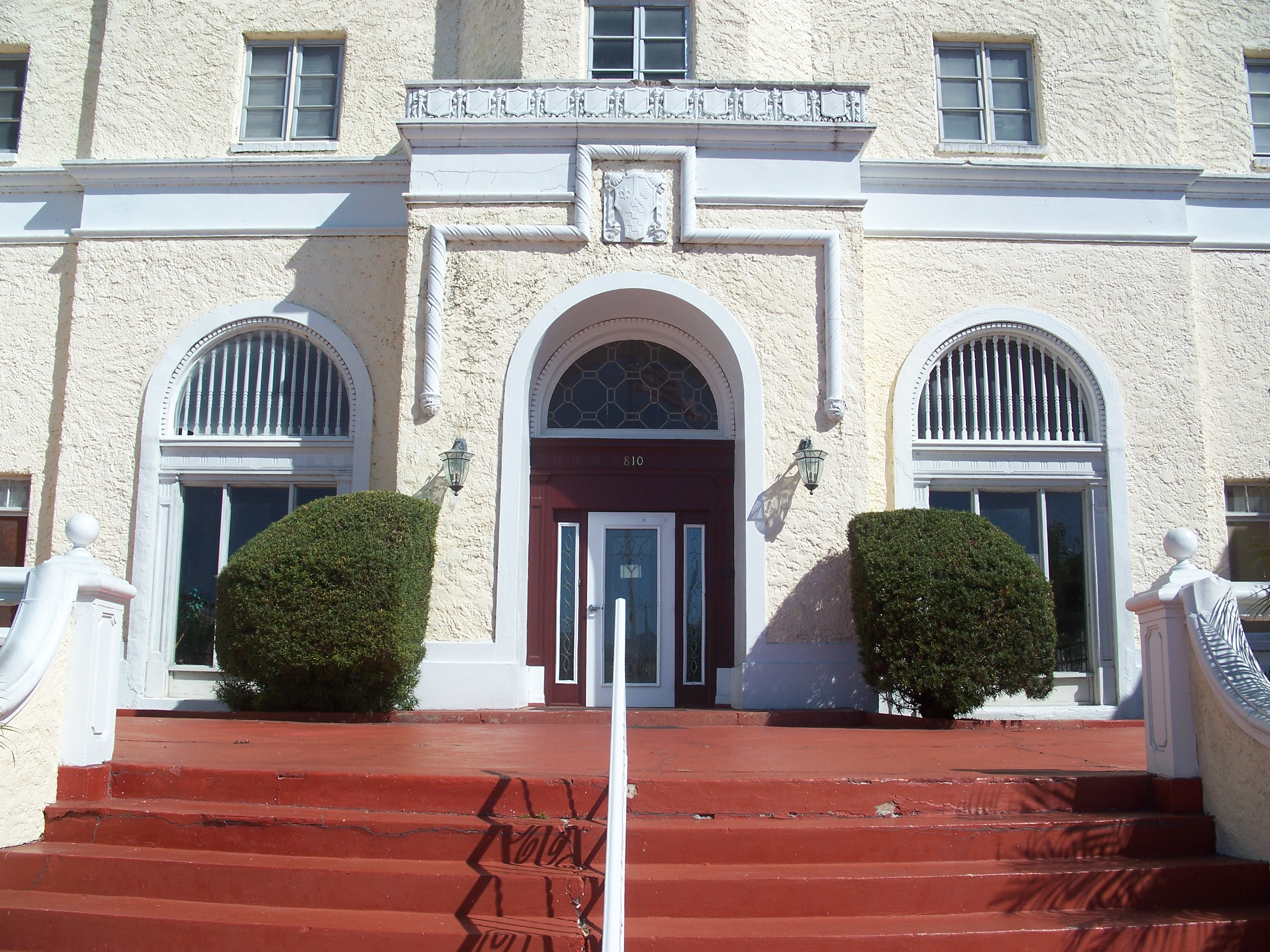

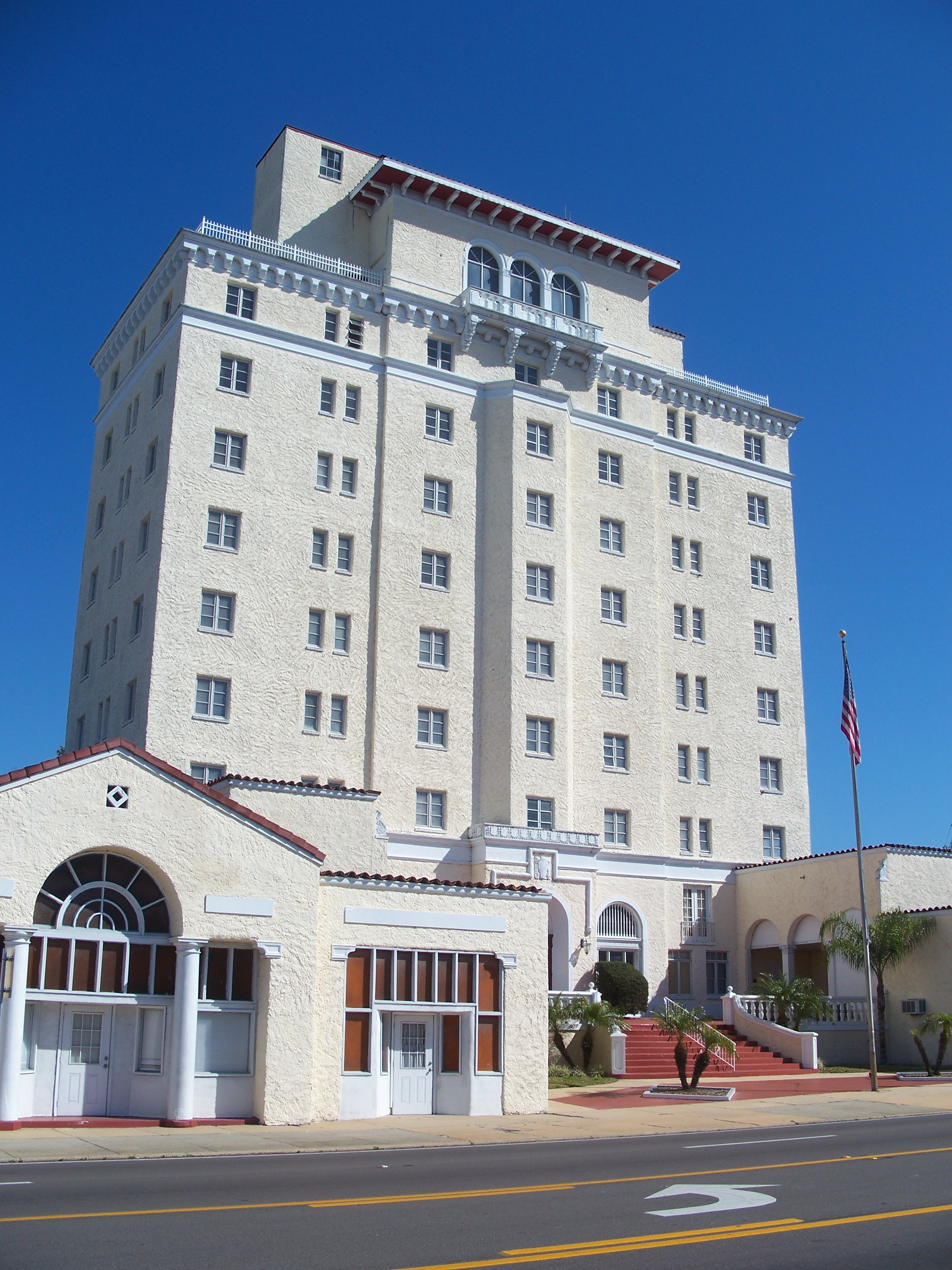

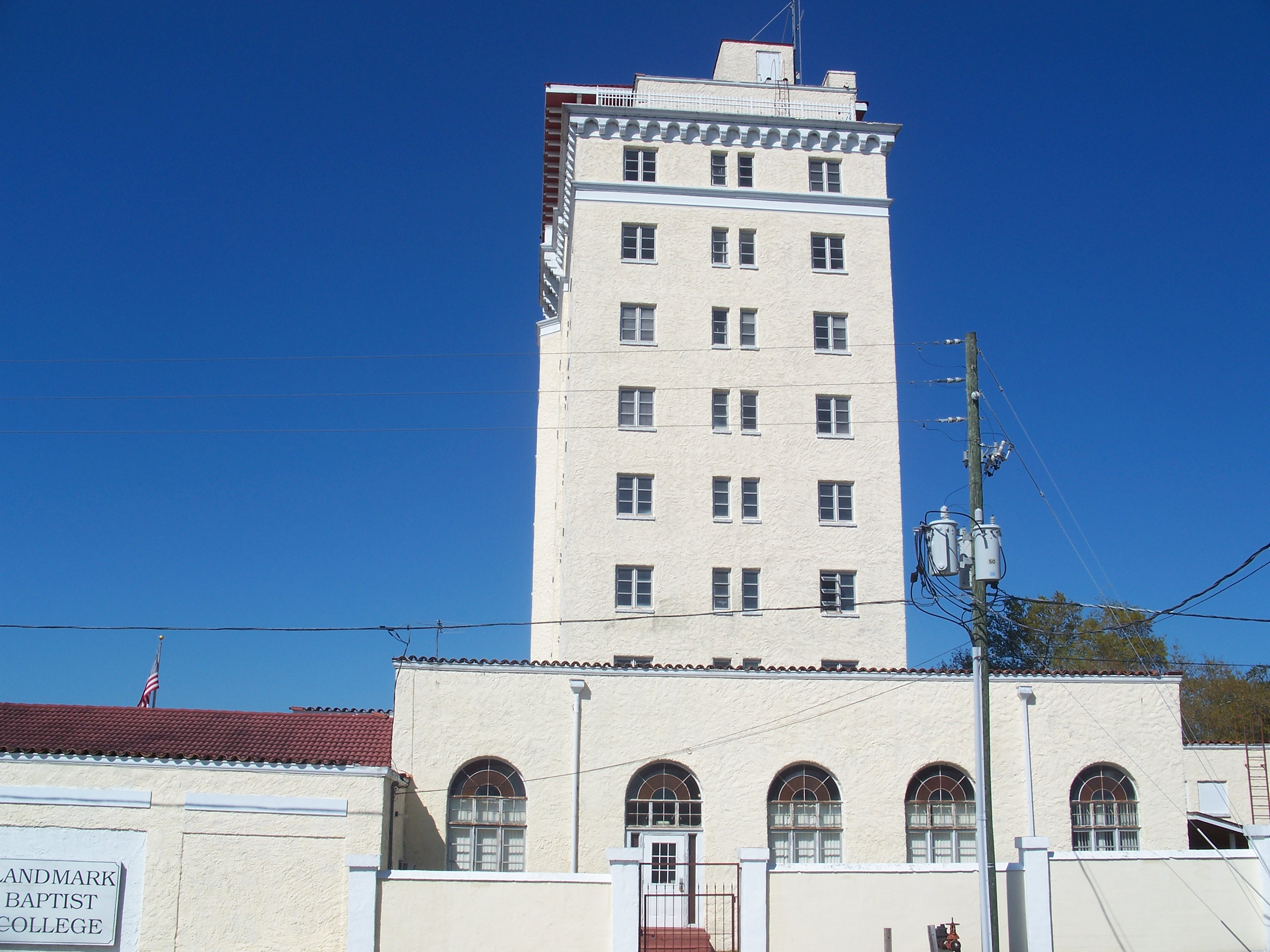

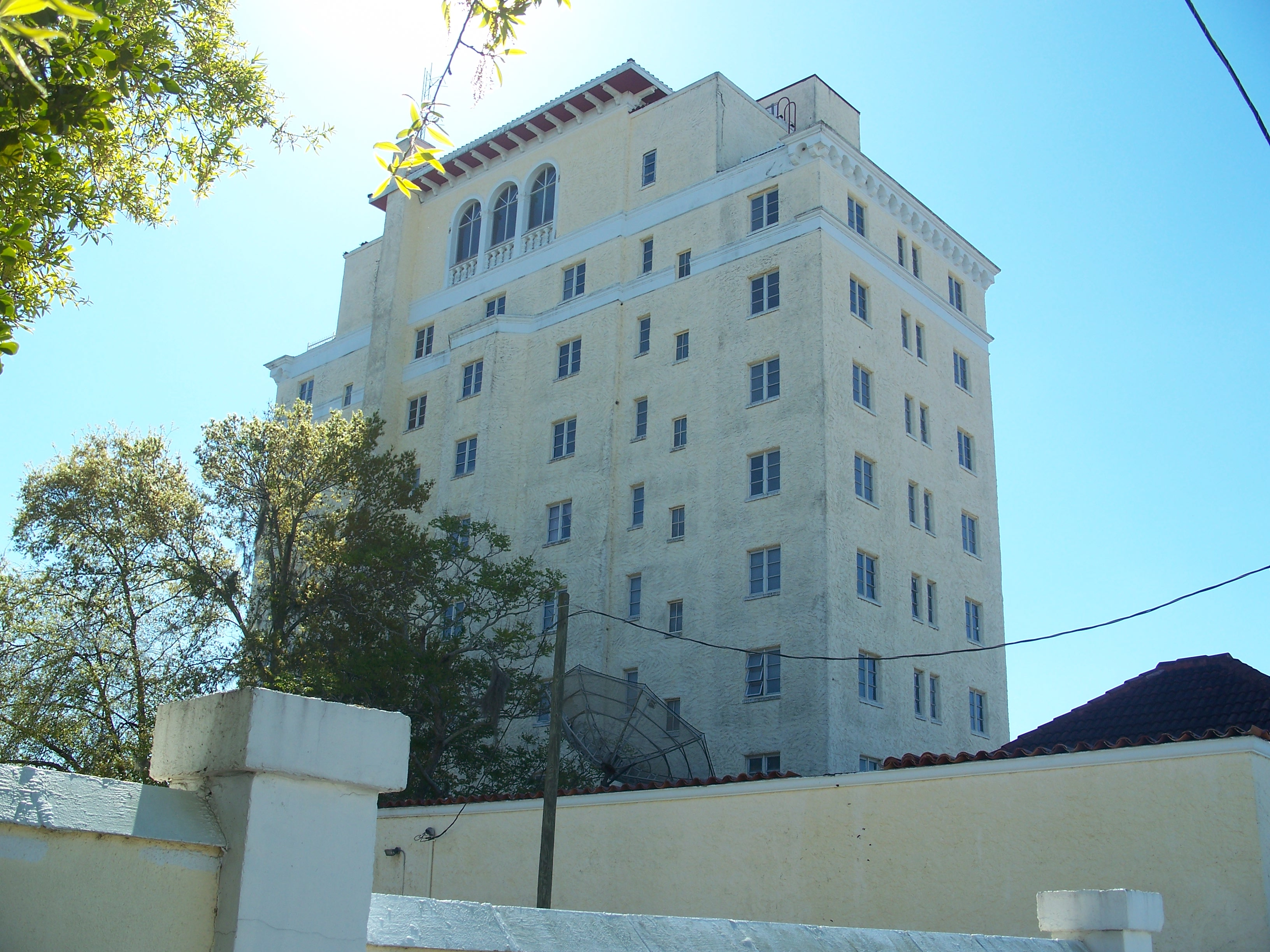
