= Henry Haines =

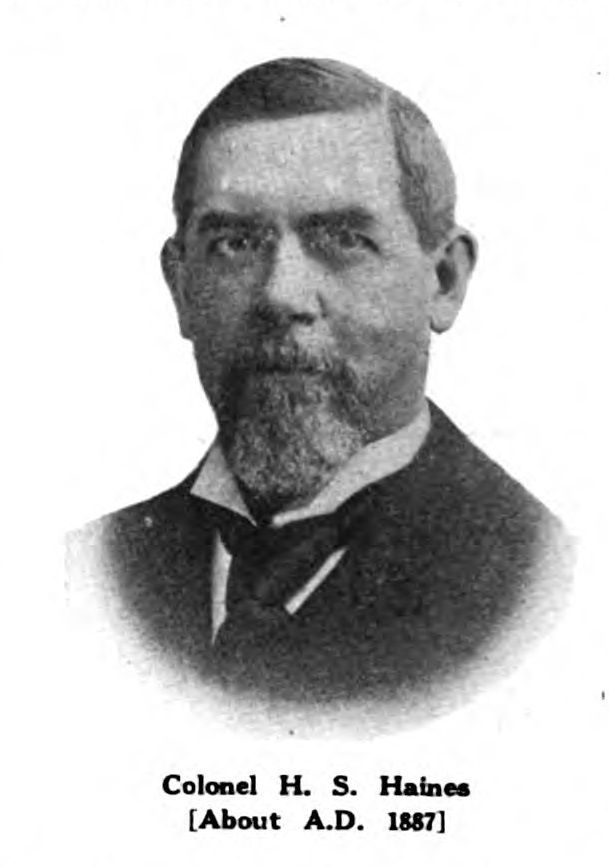
- Henry Haines (1887)
- Born: November 21, 1836; Nantucket, Massachusetts
- Died: November 3, 1923 (aged 86); Lenox, Massachusetts
- Burial place: Bonaventure Cemetery Savannah, Georgia
- Years active: 1850s — 1894
- Employer: Henry Plant
- Known for: Railroads
- Notable work: South Florida Railroad
- Spouses: Elizabeth J. Owens; (1857 — 1865): Anna H. Davies; (1865 — ?)

Henry Stevens Haines (November 21, 1836 – November 3, 1923), was an accomplished engineer, a colonel in the Confederate Army during the Civil War, and an important developer of railroads in the South. He played an essential role in the development of the Plant System of railroads. Haines City, Florida, and Lake Haines, on the Chain of Lakes in Winter Haven, Florida, are named after him.

== Personal life ==
Henry Haines was born in Nantucket, Massachusetts. However, he grew up in Savannah, Georgia. At age 21, he married Elizabeth J. Owens from Charleston, South Carolina. They had four children together. After his first wife died from yellow fever, Haines married Anna H. Davies, daughter of a prominent Episcopalian bishop from Michigan. They had two sons together.

Haines continued to work actively on the railroad until age 58. After retiring, he spent several years traveling around Europe. Haines died shortly before his 87th birthday, having lived to an unusually old age for that time.

== Business career ==
During the 1850s, Haines worked as a railroad superintendent in South Carolina. After the outbreak of the Civil War, he joined the Confederate Army, and was given the rank of colonel. He served as a logistical officer, maintaining military transport and supply lines in the Carolinas. His work during the war mostly focused on the railroad system. By the end of the war, he was an expert on railroad construction and management. He was said to be able to "lay track, run an engine, mend a boiler, issue payroll, and balance the books - all in the same morning".

After the war, having lost his fortune and his wife, he was greatly discouraged. He then worked for the Atlantic and Gulf Railroad, helping to re-build the railroad system in the South. He eventually became employed by Henry Plant, as the great railroad magnate purchased many smaller railroads all across the South. Haines quickly became Plant's most trusted employee and played an important part in the development of the Plant System of railroads. He served as a general manager and vice-president of Plant's railroads and had an office in New York City. Haines worked for Henry Plant until his retirement in 1894.

Even though Haines was not college educated, he was widely considered one of the leading experts in the world on railroad construction and operation. He wrote several important academic treatises about railroads during his retirement years. His works include, "American Railway Management" published in 1897, and "Problems In RailRoad Regulation" published in 1911.

== South Florida Railroad ==
Haines' most notable achievement was the construction of South Florida Railroad in 1883-1884. In 1883, Henry Plant acquired a charter from the state of Florida to connect Sanford, Florida and Tampa, Florida by railroad. Henry Plant had long wanted to connect the deep water, natural harbors in Tampa Bay to the national railroad system. He knew that Tampa would quickly develop into an important port city serving ships headed to Cuba and Central America. However, because of political wrangling in the state, Plant's charter was only good for seven months, from June 1883 until the end of January 1884.

In order to succeed with the Sanford-Tampa Charter, Plant had to lay over 70 miles (110 km) of new railroad through thick sub-tropical forests, wetlands, and swamps of central Florida before his charter expired. Plant called on Haines to oversee the entire operation in the field. Haines organized thousands of men, working together like clockwork, to complete this impressive engineering achievement. Over a thousand men were employed to just cut the vegetation and clear the land. Crews of blacksmiths and wheelwrights were at work 24 hours a day to stay on schedule. Tools, heavy equipment, work materials, food, and fresh water all had to be brought to the work site as it progressed across Florida. The operation began in June 1883, right at the beginning of the rainy season. Afternoon rains would deluge the worksite, turning everything to mud. Haines and his men struggled to move forward, and finally reached Tampa Bay with just a month to spare.

The completion of this railroad line helped cement Henry Plant's dominance in the railroad industry. It also changed the history of central Florida, causing rapid growth all along the new railroad line, in towns including Orlando, Tampa, and Lakeland. Interstate Highway 4 today runs a similar course to the original railroad, passing through the same areas that originally boomed because of the new railroad construction.

Plant City, Florida, was established during the construction of the railroad, and was named for Henry Plant. In 1887, four years after the completion of the Sanford-Tampa Line, the village of Clay Cut was renamed Haines City, in honor of Haines.
