= 1985 Chrysler Tournament of Champions =

- Date: April 22–28
- Edition: 6th
- Category: 4
- Draw: 24S / 6D
- Prize money: $200,000
- Surface: Clay / outdoors
- Location: Orlando, Florida, U.S.
- Venue: Hyatt Regency Grand Cypress

Champions

Singles
- (United States) Martina Navratilova

Doubles
- (United States) Martina Navratilova (United States) Pam Shriver
- Tournament of Champions

The 1985 Chrysler Tournament of Champions was a women's tennis tournament played on outdoor clay courts at the Hyatt Regency Grand Cypress in Orlando, Florida in the United States that was part of the Category 4 tier of the 1985 Virginia Slims World Championship Series. It was the sixth edition of the tournament and was held from April 22 through April 28, 1985. First-seeded Martina Navratilova won her sixth consecutive singles title at the event and earned $50,000 first-prize money. The event marked the return to the WTA Tour of Regina Maršíková after an absence of three and a half years.

== Finals ==
=== Singles ===
(United States) Martina Navratilova defeated (Bulgaria) Katerina Maleeva 6–1, 6–0

- It was Navratilova's 5th singles title of the year and the 104th of her career.

=== Doubles ===
(United States) Martina Navratilova / (United States) Pam Shriver defeated (United States) Elise Burgin / (United States) Kathleen Horvath 6–3, 6–1
