= Haines City, Florida =

- City
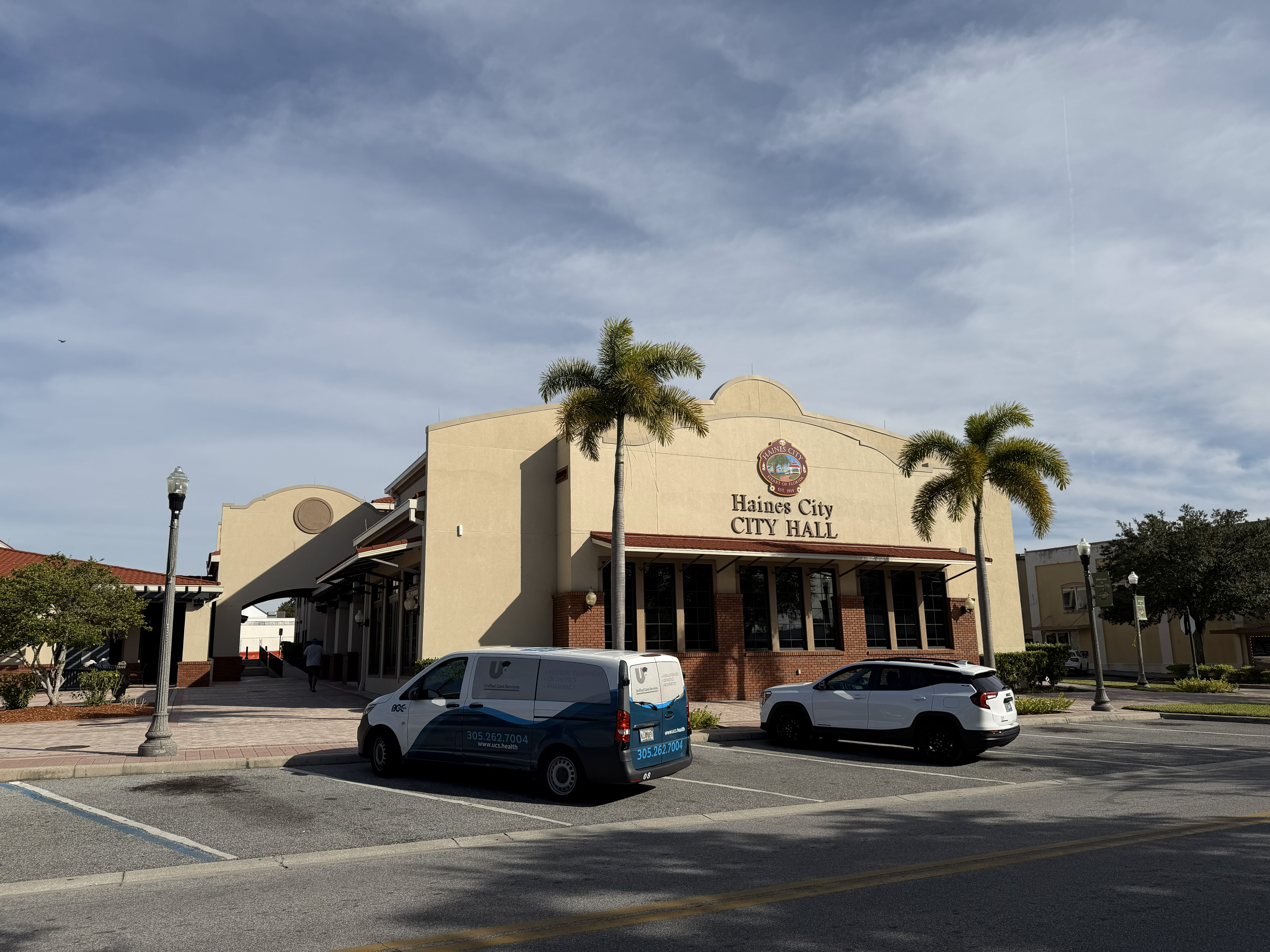
- City Hall of Haines City

- Seal
- Nickname: "Heart of Florida"
- Location in Polk County and the state of Florida
- Coordinates: 28°08′02″N 81°37′46″W
- Country: United States
- State: Florida
- County: Polk
- Platted (Clay Cut): 1885
- Incorporated (Town of Haines City): February 23, 1914
- Incorporated (City of Haines City): January 5, 1925
- Named for: Colonel Henry Haines

Government
  - Type: Commission–Manager

Area
  - Total: 20.10 sq mi (52.06 km^{2})
  - Land: 18.75 sq mi (48.57 km^{2})
  - Water: 1.35 sq mi (3.49 km^{2}) 7.27%
- Elevation: 157 ft (48 m)

Population (2020)
  - Total: 26,669
  - Estimate (2025): 45,973
  - Density: 1,422.0/sq mi (549.05/km^{2})
- Time zone: UTC-5 (EST)
  - Summer (DST): UTC-4 (EDT)
- ZIP codes: 33844-33845
- Area code: 863
- FIPS code: 12-28400
- GNIS feature ID: 2403781
- Website: hainescity.com

Haines City is a city in Polk County, Florida, United States. Its population was 26,669 at the 2020 census. It is part of the Lakeland–Winter Haven Metropolitan Statistical Area. As of the 2020 census, Haines City's population was almost half Hispanic, a quarter white, and about a fifth African American.

== History ==
Haines City was platted in 1884, shortly after the South Florida Railroad reached the area. The city was originally known as Clay Cut, but there was no railroad station. It is said that the inhabitants persuaded the railroad company to build a station by agreeing to rename their city Haines City, to honor a senior railroad official, former Confederate States Army Colonel Henry Haines.

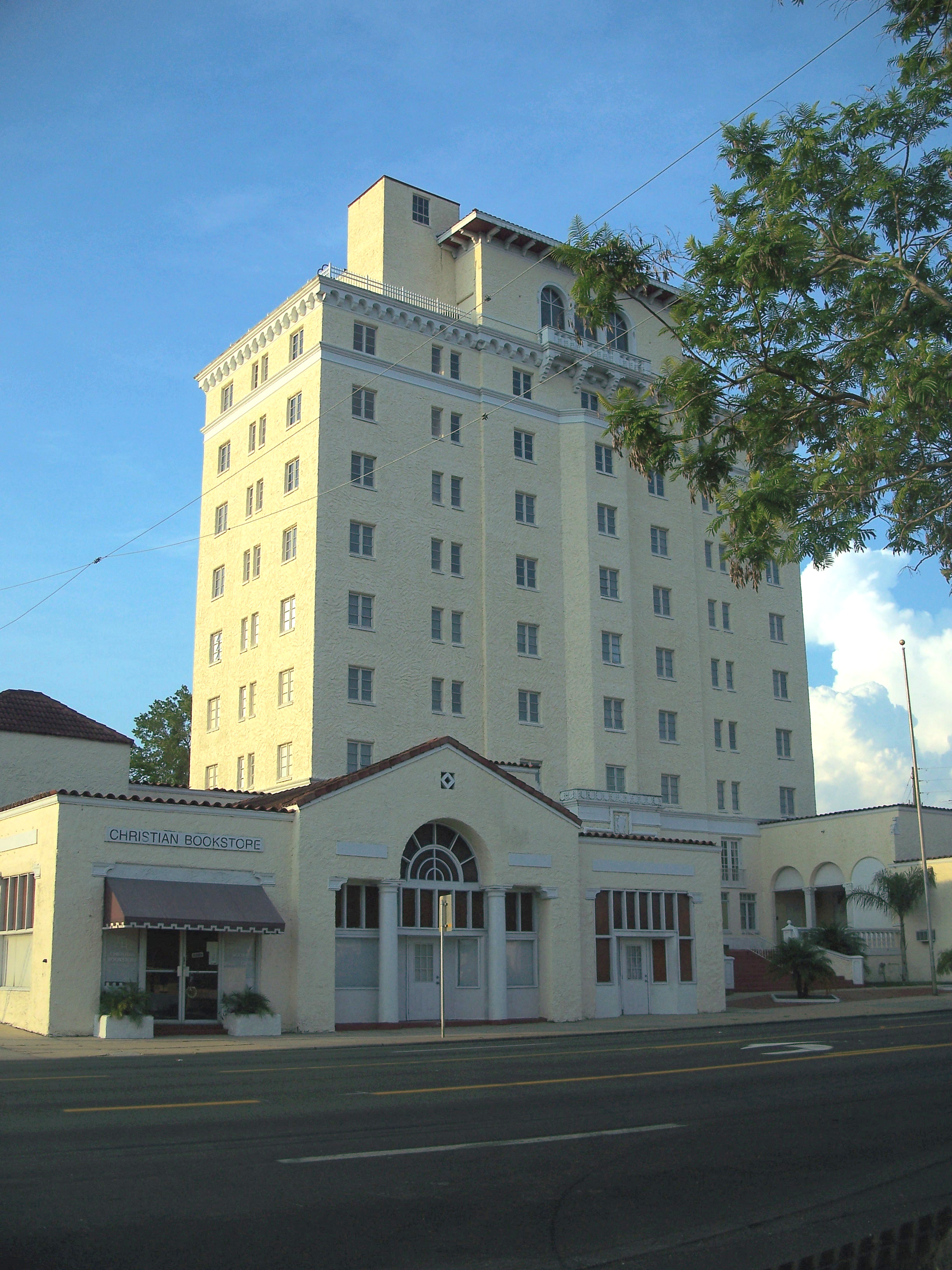
The Polk Hotel

Haines City was originally incorporated under the General Statutes of Florida as the Town of Haines City on February 23, 1914. The first state legislative act affecting it was enacted on May 20, 1919, and, by Chapter 8272, it was reincorporated as the City of Haines City on January 5, 1925, under a Mayor-Council form of government. The present charter was adopted as Chapter 12790 on July 1, 1927, changing the form of government to "Commission-Manager Plan," as amended. The city operates under a commission-manager form of government and provides the following services as authorized by its charter: Public safety (Police and Fire), Streets and Highways, Culture-Recreation, Public Improvements, Sanitation, Planning and Zoning and General and Administrative Services.

The early settlers planted citrus groves, and citrus growing and processing became the main industry of the city.

African Americans first came to Haines City in 1902 and made a community called "Oakland" named after the various oak tree's that were in the area at the time. Its history is commemorated with a historic district and historical marker. Redevelopment efforts seek to reestablish more business activity in the neighborhood.

From 1974 to 1986, Circus World, a theme park created by the Ringling Brothers and Barnum & Bailey Circus, was open just north of Haines City. After Circus World shut down, it was rebranded & reopened as Boardwalk and Baseball. It featured carnival games and theme park styled rides like the Grand Rapids Flume. It closed in 1990, and the site has been redeveloped as a residential and shopping complex named Posner Park.

In recent years, Haines City has seen explosive growth, largely because of its easy access to Orlando and Walt Disney World Resort. New residential areas have been developed on the edges of the city. On high ground in the north of the city, Southern Dunes, a golf and country club with both vacation homes and residential homes, was developed between 1995 and 2005.

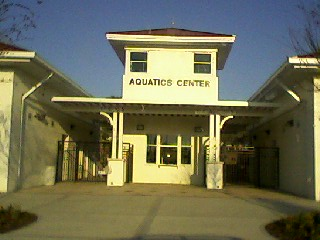
The Aquatics Center in Lake Eva Park.

In 2004, Haines City experienced three hurricanes. Hurricane Charley passed through the city in August. Hurricane Frances came right on the heels of Charley but mostly just dumped a lot of rain. Hurricane Jeanne soon followed packing a punch not quite as strong as Charley but longer lasting. The city has since recovered.

The former seal of Haines City.

Four years after Charley, Haines City got struck again this time by a weaker storm named Tropical Storm Fay. This storm caused little damage, but schools closed on the second day of the school year (Tuesday, August 19, 2008) due to it; the original plan had been to close schools Tuesday and Wednesday, but the lack of danger it showed on Tuesday caused the change in agenda.

=== Park renovations ===
A new park on Lake Eva, replacing a previous park on the site, was completed in 2009. The city has also built a new park, called "8-Acre Park", and auditorium in the Oakland area, on the northern side of the city.

=== Brush fire ===
Haines City was the site of a 350-acre (1.4 km^{2}) brush fire on March 25, 2009. It was a scare to the residents of dozens of houses in a housing complex named Randa Ridge.

== City officials ==
Haines City operates on a council-manager system, with five City Commissioners elected at large who appoint a City Manager and other officials in the city administration.

== Geography ==
The City of Haines City is located within the Central Florida Highlands area of the Atlantic coastal plain, part of the Lake Wales Ridge, a sandy terrain consisting of a low ridge of gently rolling hills rising from the coastal flatlands.

According to the United States Census Bureau, the city has a total area of 19.8 square miles (51 km^{2}), of which 8.3 square miles (21 km^{2}) is land and 0.6 square miles (1.6 km^{2}), 7.27% of the total, is water.

=== Climate ===
Haines City is located in the humid subtropical zone as designated by (Köppen climate classification: Cfa). The porous white sands and open terrain create the often hot and dry climate that parts of interior Florida near the Lakes Wales sand ridge is known for.

Climate data for Haines City, Florida
Month	Jan	Feb	Mar	Apr	May	Jun	Jul	Aug	Sep	Oct	Nov	Dec	Year
Record high °F (°C)	88 (31)	96 (36)	95 (35)	96 (36)	101 (38)	104 (40)	103 (39)	101 (38)	99 (37)	96 (36)	90 (32)	89 (32)	104 (40)
Mean daily maximum °F (°C)	72 (22)	74 (23)	79 (26)	84 (29)	89 (32)	92 (33)	93 (34)	93 (34)	91 (33)	86 (30)	80 (27)	74 (23)	90.5 (32.5)
Mean daily minimum °F (°C)	47 (8)	49 (9)	54 (12)	58 (14)	64 (18)	70 (21)	72 (22)	72 (22)	70 (21)	63 (17)	56 (13)	50 (10)	60.4 (15.8)
Record low °F (°C)	19 (−7)	21 (−6)	24 (−4)	31 (−1)	44 (7)	50 (10)	60 (16)	59 (15)	54 (12)	38 (3)	25 (−4)	16 (−9)	16 (−9)
Average precipitation inches (mm)	2.5 (64)	2.9 (74)	3.4 (86)	2.0 (51)	4.1 (100)	6.9 (180)	7.1 (180)	7.4 (190)	6.5 (170)	3.0 (76)	2.3 (58)	2.3 (58)	50.4 (1,280)
Source: The Weather Channel

== Demographics ==
Historical population
Census	Pop.	Note	%±
1920	651		—
1930	3,037		366.5%
1940	3,890		28.1%
1950	5,630		44.7%
1960	9,135		62.3%
1970	8,956		−2.0%
1980	10,799		20.6%
1990	11,683		8.2%
2000	13,174		12.8%
2010	20,535		55.9%
2020	26,669		29.9%
2025 (est.)	45,973	▲	72.4%
U.S. Decennial Census

=== Racial and ethnic composition ===
Haines City racial composition (Hispanics excluded from racial categories) (NH = Non-Hispanic)
Race	Pop 2010	Pop 2020	% 2010	% 2020
White (NH)	6,540	6,783	31.85%	25.43%
Black or African American (NH)	5,425	5,644	26.42%	21.16%
Native American or Alaska Native (NH)	36	42	0.18%	0.16%
Asian (NH)	280	376	1.36%	1.41%
Pacific Islander or Native Hawaiian (NH)	4	23	0.02%	0.09%
Some other race (NH)	37	155	0.18%	0.58%
Two or more races/Multiracial (NH)	233	610	1.13%	2.29%
Hispanic or Latino (any race)	7,980	13,036	38.86%	48.88%
Total	20,535	26,669	100.00%	100.00%

=== 2020 census ===
As of the 2020 census, Haines City had a population of 26,669. The median age was 37.0 years. 25.7% of residents were under the age of 18 and 16.1% of residents were 65 years of age or older. For every 100 females there were 93.4 males, and for every 100 females age 18 and over there were 89.1 males age 18 and over.

99.3% of residents lived in urban areas, while 0.7% lived in rural areas.

There were 8,988 households in Haines City, of which 40.3% had children under the age of 18 living in them. Of all households, 49.0% were married-couple households, 14.9% were households with a male householder and no spouse or partner present, and 27.8% were households with a female householder and no spouse or partner present. About 18.6% of all households were made up of individuals and 9.5% had someone living alone who was 65 years of age or older.

There were 11,006 housing units, of which 18.3% were vacant. The homeowner vacancy rate was 4.6% and the rental vacancy rate was 11.6%.

Racial composition as of the 2020 census
Race	Number	Percent
White	9,705	36.4%
Black or African American	5,915	22.2%
American Indian and Alaska Native	201	0.8%
Asian	393	1.5%
Native Hawaiian and Other Pacific Islander	28	0.1%
Some other race	5,167	19.4%
Two or more races	5,260	19.7%
Hispanic or Latino (of any race)	13,036	48.9%

=== 2010 census ===
As of the 2010 United States census, there were 20,535 people, 6,961 households, and 4,975 families residing in the city.

=== 2000 census ===
As of the census of 2000, there were 13,174 people, 4,749 households, and 3,409 families residing in the city. The population density was 1,588.7 inhabitants per square mile (613.4/km^{2}). There were 6,283 housing units at an average density of 757.7 units per square mile (292.5 units/km^{2}). The racial makeup of the city was 54.87% White, 31.86% African American, 0.52% Native American, 0.39% Asian, 0.04% Pacific Islander, 10.42% from other races, and 1.90% from two or more races. Hispanic or Latino of any race were 23.33% of the population.

In 2000, there were 4,749 households, out of which 30.7% had children under the age of 18 living with them, 49.3% were married couples living together, 17.4% had a female householder with no husband present, and 28.2% were non-families. 23.2% of all households were made up of individuals, and 12.3% had someone living alone who was 65 years of age or older. The average household size was 2.73 and the average family size was 3.18.

In 2000, in the city, the population was spread out, with 27.2% under the age of 18, 10.3% from 18 to 24, 25.0% from 25 to 44, 18.9% from 45 to 64, and 18.6% who were 65 years of age or older. The median age was 35 years. For every 100 females, there were 96.2 males. For every 100 females age 18 and over, there were 91.1 males.

In 2000, the median income for a household in the city was $27,636, and the median income for a family was $30,678. Males had a median income of $21,806 versus $19,279 for females. The per capita income for the city was $13,818. About 14.7% of families and 18.6% of the population were below the poverty line, including 24.3% of those under age 18 and 11.2% of those age 65 or over.

== Transportation ==
The major highways in the Haines City area are:

- I-4 (Interstate 4) – Six miles north of town on US 27 lies Interstate 4, the main interstate highway in central Florida. It leads westward to Lakeland and Tampa, and eastward toward Orlando.
- US 17 / US 92 – US 17/92 enters the city from Lake Alfred in the west, bisecting the downtown as Hinson Avenue until turning north on 17th Street and exiting towards Davenport.
- US 27 – The main north–south highway in the area, US 27 leads northward to I-4 and further through Clermont. It leads southward to Lake Wales, Sebring and eventually Miami.
- SR 17 – Called 10th Street in Haines City, this old Scenic Highway leads through hills in eastern Polk County and providing a scenic route southward to Lake Hamilton, Dundee, and Lake Wales, and on to Sebring.
- SR 544 – This road, also a scenic drive, connects SR 17 and US 27 in southern Haines City, and continues westward from there as Lucerne Park Road on its way to Winter Haven.

The streets are laid out in a rough grid plan, with streets running north–south and numbered from 1st Street to 30th Street, and named avenues running west–east.

Haines City is served by an hourly bus service to Lake Alfred and Winter Haven by Winter Haven Area Transit and, from December 16, 2012, by hourly Lynx bus services to Poinciana and Four Corners.

Railroads have always been a part of Haines City's history, and freight and passenger trains still run through the city, although the railroad station has been closed for many years.

== Library ==
The Haines City Public Library is a member of the Polk County Library Cooperative. It is located at 111 N 6th Street Haines City, FL 33844.

Haines City first established a library in 1916, under the direction of the Women's Club of Haines City. The first library was located inside the Leisure Lodge, which was located on Railroad Park. In 1927, when that building was demolished as part of a road widening project, the library relocated to Hinson Avenue. The library was forced to relocate again in 1959 due to another widening project, at which time the Women's Club rented space for the library at the Palm Crest Hotel (also known as the Polk Hotel, which today houses the Landmark Baptist College). The City of Haines City assumed official responsibility of the library in September 1960, whereupon it moved the library to a building on Ledwith Avenue. The library moved to its current location on N. Sixth Street in 2012, and is co-located with City Hall. A non-profit organization, the Friends of the Haines City Public Library, Inc., provides support to the library.

In 1997, the Polk County Library Cooperative was created. This interlocal agreement between municipal and county governments allows all residents to receive library services and materials from any library within the county. The library co-op also supplies a mobile library and a Books by Mail service, which mails library materials to patrons without fees.

== Education ==
Haines City's public school district is served by Polk County Public Schools.

=== Public elementary schools ===
- Alta Vista Elementary School
- Bethune Academy (Elementary School)
- Eastside Elementary School

=== Public middle schools ===
- Daniel Jenkins Academy of Technology (Middle School)
- Shelley S. Boone Middle School

=== Public high schools ===
- Haines City High School
- Ridge Community High School

=== Private schools ===
- Landmark Baptist College
- Landmark Christian School
- Champions Christian Academy

== Notable people ==
- Wayne Gandy (born 1971), professional NFL football player
- Mary Hatcher (1929–2018), singer and actress
- Derwin James (born 1996), professional NFL football player
- Tommy Land (born 1955), Arkansas Commissioner of State Lands
- Joseph Mitchell (1922–1993), city manager 1974–1977; formerly the city manager of Newburgh, New York
- Jah Reid (born 1988), professional NFL football player
- James Stewart Jr. (born 1985), American professional motocross racer
- Malcolm Stewart (born 1992), American professional Supercross racer
- Sevyn Streeter (born 1986), R&B singer and songwriter
