= United Airlines Tournament of Champions =

Defunct tennis tournament
- Event name: United Airlines Tournament of Champions (1980–84); Chrysler Tournament of Champions (1985)
- Tour: WTA Tour (1980–85)
- Founded: 1980
- Abolished: 1986
- Editions: 7
- Location: Orlando, Florida, U.S. (1980–85); Marco Island, Florida, U.S. (1986)
- Venue: Greenelefe Resort (1980–83); Grand Cypress (1984–85)
- Surface: Hard (1980–83); Clay (1984–86)

The United Airlines Tournament of Champions is a defunct WTA Tour affiliated tennis tournament played from 1980 to 1986. It was held in Orlando, Florida in the United States from 1980 through 1985, where it was played on outdoor hard courts at the Greenelefe Golf & Tennis Resort from 1980 through 1983 and on clay courts at the Grand Cypress resort in 1984 and 1985. In 1986 the tournament moved to Marco Island, Florida where it was played on clay courts. Only players who had won a tournament with prize money of at least $20,000 during the previous year were eligible to enter the event.

Martina Navratilova was the most successful player at the tournament, winning the first six singles competitions and winning the doubles competition three times.

== Results ==
=== Singles ===
Year	Champions	Runners-up	Score
1980	(United States) Martina Navratilova	(United States) Tracy Austin	6–2, 6–4
1981	(United States) Martina Navratilova	(United States) Andrea Jaeger	7–5, 6–3
1982	(United States) Martina Navratilova	(Australia) Wendy Turnbull	6–2, 7–5
1983	(United States) Martina Navratilova	(United States) Andrea Jaeger	6–1, 7–5
1984	(United States) Martina Navratilova	(Peru) Laura Arraya	6–0, 6–1
1985	(United States) Martina Navratilova	(Bulgaria) Katerina Maleeva	6–1, 6–0
1986	(United States) Chris Evert-Lloyd	(West Germany) Claudia Kohde-Kilsch	6–2, 6–4

=== Doubles ===
Year	Champions	Runners-up	Score
1980	Not held		
1981	(United States) Martina Navratilova (United States) Pam Shriver	(United States) Rosemary Casals (Australia) Wendy Turnbull	6–1, 7–6
1982	(United States) Rosemary Casals (Australia) Wendy Turnbull	(United States) Kathy Jordan (United States) Anne Smith	6–3, 6–3
1983	(United States) Billie Jean King (United States) Anne Smith	(United States) Martina Navratilova (United States) Pam Shriver	6–3, 1–6, 7–6
1984	(West Germany) Claudia Kohde-Kilsch (Czechoslovakia) Hana Mandlíková	(United Kingdom) Anne Hobbs (Australia) Wendy Turnbull	6–0, 1–6, 6–3
1985	(United States) Martina Navratilova (United States) Pam Shriver	(United States) Elise Burgin (United States) Kathleen Horvath	6–3, 6–1
1986	(United States) Martina Navratilova (Hungary) Andrea Temesvári	(United States) Kathy Jordan (United States) Elise Burgin	7–5, 6–2

== See also ==
- Barnett Bank Tennis Classic – women's tournament in Orlando (1974–1975)
