= 1984 NSW Building Society Open – Men's singles =

Men's singles
- 1984 NSW Building Society Open

Final
- Champion: (Australia) John Fitzgerald
- Runner-up: (United States) Sammy Giammalva Jr.
- Score: 6–3, 6–3

Details
- Draw: 56 (4WC/7Q)
- Seeds: 16

Events
Singles	men	women
Doubles	men	women
← 1983 ·	Sydney International	· 1985 →

Joakim Nyström was the defending champion, but did not compete this year.

John Fitzgerald won the title by defeating Sammy Giammalva Jr. 6–3, 6–3 in the final.

== Seeds ==
The first eight seeds received a bye into the second round.

1. (United States) Johan Kriek (semifinals)
2. (United States) Tim Mayotte (second round)
3. (South Africa) Kevin Curren (semifinals)
4. (United Kingdom) John Lloyd (second round)
5. (United States) Mike Bauer (second round)
6. (United States) Ben Testerman (quarterfinals)
7. (Czechoslovakia) Miloslav Mečíř (second round)
8. (France) Guy Forget (second round)
9. (Australia) John Fitzgerald (champion)
10. (United States) Bill Scanlon (quarterfinals)
11. (United States) Marty Davis (quarterfinals)
12. (United States) Leif Shiras (second round)
13. (United States) Scott Davis (third round)
14. (Australia) Wally Masur (third round)
15. (United States) Tom Gullikson (quarterfinals)
16. (Australia) Brad Drewett (third round)

== Draw ==
=== Key ===
- Q = Qualifier
- WC = Wild card
- LL = Lucky loser
- Alt = Alternate
- SE = Special exempt
- PR = Protected ranking
- ITF = ITF entry
- JE = Junior exempt
- w/o = Walkover
- r = Retired
- d = Defaulted
- SR = Special ranking

=== Finals ===
Quarterfinals
1/WC	(United States) Johan Kriek	4	7	6
11	(United States) Marty Davis	6	5	3
(United States) Sammy Giammalva Jr.	7	6
10	(United States) Bill Scanlon	6	3
6	(United States) Ben Testerman	3	7	6
3	(South Africa) Kevin Curren	6	6	7
15	(United States) Tom Gullikson	6	7	6
9	(Australia) John Fitzgerald	7	6	7

Semifinals
1/WC	(United States) Johan Kriek	7	4	3
(United States) Sammy Giammalva Jr.	5	6	6
3	(South Africa) Kevin Curren	6	2	2
9	(Australia) John Fitzgerald	4	6	6

Final
(United States) Sammy Giammalva Jr.	3	3
9	(Australia) John Fitzgerald	6	6

=== Top half ===
==== Section 1 ====
First round
(United States) D Saltz	6	7
(West Germany) A Maurer	4	6
(Switzerland) J Hlasek	3	4
WC	(Australia) M Kratzmann	6	6
(Australia) J Frawley	1	4
13	(United States) S Davis	6	6
11	(United States) M Davis	7	4	6
(Paraguay) F González	6	6	4
(New Zealand) B Derlin	6	3	6
Q	(Australia) K Warwick	3	6	7
(Australia) J Alexander	6	5	4
Q	(United States) K Flach	3	7	6

Second round
1/WC	(United States) J Kriek	6	7
(United States) D Saltz	4	6
WC	(Australia) M Kratzmann	1	4
13	(United States) S Davis	6	6
11	(United States) M Davis	4	7	0
Q	(Australia) K Warwick	6	6	1^{r}
Q	(United States) K Flach	6	4	6
5	(United States) M Bauer	4	6	0

Third round
1/WC	(United States) J Kriek	6	6
13	(United States) S Davis	1	4
11	(United States) M Davis	3	6	6
Q	(United States) K Flach	6	3	3

Quarterfinals
1/WC	(United States) J Kriek	4	7	6
11	(United States) M Davis	6	5	3

==== Section 2 ====
First round
(United States) S Giammalva Jr.	6	6
(United States) M De Palmer	4	2
(United States) L Bourne	2	6	1
(South Africa) C van Rensburg	6	4	6
(United States) G Layendecker	1	5
16	(Australia) B Drewett	6	7
10	(United States) B Scanlon	2	7	6
(New Zealand) R Simpson	6	6	4
(United States) D Cassidy	3	2
(France) T Benhabiles	6	6
Q	(United States) R Knapp	4	4
Q	(United States) T Cain	6	6

Second round
4	(United Kingdom) J Lloyd	2	1
(United States) S Giammalva Jr.	6	6
(South Africa) C van Rensburg	5	3
16	(Australia) B Drewett	7	6
10	(United States) B Scanlon	6	6
(France) T Benhabiles	4	4
Q	(United States) T Cain	6	3	6
8	(France) G Forget	3	6	4

Third round
(United States) S Giammalva Jr.	6	6
16	(Australia) B Drewett	2	4
10	(United States) B Scanlon	7	4	6
Q	(United States) T Cain	6	6	4

Quarterfinals
(United States) S Giammalva Jr.	7	6
10	(United States) B Scanlon	6	3

=== Bottom half ===
==== Section 3 ====
First round
(United Kingdom) C Dowdeswell	6	7
(United States) J Mattke	4	6
(West Germany) B Becker	4	4
(South Africa) E Edwards	6	6
WC	(Australia) S Youl	3	2
14	(Australia) W Masur	6	6
12	(United States) L Shiras	7	7
Q	(United States) S McCain	6	6
(United States) M Freeman	5	1
(Israel) S Perkiss	7	6
(Germany) D Keretić	1	6	6
(United States) P Annacone	6	2	1

Second round
6	(United States) B Testerman	6	7
(United Kingdom) C Dowdeswell	3	5
(South Africa) E Edwards	0^{r}
14	(Australia) W Masur	4
12	(United States) L Shiras	4	6
(Israel) S Perkiss	6	7
(Germany) D Keretić	4	4
3	(South Africa) K Curren	6	6

Third round
6	(United States) B Testerman	3	6	6
14	(Australia) W Masur	6	3	4
(Israel) S Perkiss	4	6	4
3	(South Africa) K Curren	6	3	6

Quarterfinals
6	(United States) B Testerman	3	7	6
3	(South Africa) K Curren	6	6	7

==== Section 4 ====
First round
WC	(Australia) P Doohan	6	7
(United States) A Andrews	4	6
Q	(United States) M Anger	4	6	7
(United States) S Denton	6	0	5
(United States) R Harmon	7	4	6
15	(United States) To Gullikson	6	6	7
9	(Australia) J Fitzgerald	6	6
(Australia) D Houston	4	2
(United States) J Turpin	2	1
(Sweden) S Simonsson	6	6
(United States) H Pfister	6	6
Q	(United States) D Gitlin	4	3

Second round
7	(Czechoslovakia) M Mečíř	3	5
WC	(Australia) P Doohan	6	7
Q	(United States) M Anger	2	7	5
15	(United States) To Gullikson	6	6	7
9	(Australia) J Fitzgerald	6	6
(Sweden) S Simonsson	2	1
(United States) H Pfister	4	7	7
2	(United States) T Mayotte	6	6	5

Third round
WC	(Australia) P Doohan	6	4	6
15	(United States) To Gullikson	3	6	7
9	(Australia) J Fitzgerald	6	7
(United States) H Pfister	4	5

Quarterfinals
15	(United States) To Gullikson	6	7	6
9	(Australia) J Fitzgerald	7	6	7
