= 1984 NSW Building Society Open – Men's doubles =

Men's doubles
- 1984 NSW Building Society Open

Final
- Champions: (United States) Paul Annacone (South Africa) Christo van Rensburg
- Runners-up: (United States) Tom Gullikson (United States) Scott McCain
- Score: 7–6, 7–5

Details
- Draw: 28
- Seeds: 8

Events
Singles	men	women
Doubles	men	women
← 1983 ·	Sydney International	· 1985 →

Mike Bauer and Pat Cash were the defending champions, but Cash did not compete this year. Bauer teamed up with Marty Davis and lost in the first round to Paul Annacone and Christo van Rensburg.

Annacone and Van Rensburg won the title by defeating Tom Gullikson and Scott McCain 7–6, 7–5 in the final.

== Seeds ==
The first four seeds received a bye into the second round.

1. (United States) Ken Flach / (United States) Robert Seguso (second round)
2. (Australia) Broderick Dyke / (Australia) Wally Masur (quarterfinals)
3. (Australia) John Alexander / (Australia) John Fitzgerald (second round)
4. (Australia) Brad Drewett / (Australia) Kim Warwick (second round)
5. (Australia) Peter Doohan / (Australia) Michael Fancutt (first round)
6. (United States) Mike Bauer / (United States) Marty Davis (first round)
7. (United States) Scott Davis / (United States) Ben Testerman (first round)
8. (Australia) David Graham / (Australia) Laurie Warder (second round)

== Draw ==
=== Key ===
- Q = Qualifier
- WC = Wild card
- LL = Lucky loser
- Alt = Alternate
- SE = Special exempt
- PR = Protected ranking
- ITF = ITF entry
- JE = Junior exempt
- w/o = Walkover
- r = Retired
- d = Defaulted
- SR = Special ranking

=== Finals ===
Semifinals
(Australia) Peter McNamara (United States) Leif Shiras	6	6	4
(United States) Paul Annacone (South Africa) Christo van Rensburg	4	7	6
(United States) Tom Gullikson (United States) Scott McCain	6	7
(United States) Steve Denton (United States) Hank Pfister	4	6

Final
(United States) Paul Annacone (South Africa) Christo van Rensburg	7	7
(United States) Tom Gullikson (United States) Scott McCain	6	5

=== Top half ===
First round
(United Kingdom) C Dowdeswell (United Kingdom) J Lloyd	6	4	6
(Australia) M Kratzmann (Australia) S Youl	3	6	3
(Australia) P McNamara (United States) L Shiras	7	6
(United States) B Cox (United States) J Turpin	5	4
(Australia) CA Miller (United States) D Saltz	6	7
7	(United States) S Davis (United States) B Testerman	1	6
(Switzerland) J Hlasek (Netherlands) H van Boeckel	5	4
(West Germany) B Becker (West Germany) A Maurer	7	6
(United States) T Mayotte (United States) B Scanlon	6	6
(United States) L Bourne (United States) B Levine	4	4
(United States) P Annacone (South Africa) C van Rensburg	3	7	6
6	(United States) M Bauer (United States) M Davis	6	6	4

Second round
1	(United States) K Flach (United States) R Seguso	4	6
(United Kingdom) C Dowdeswell (United Kingdom) J Lloyd	6	7
(Australia) P McNamara (United States) L Shiras	6	6
(Australia) CA Miller (United States) D Saltz	2	4
3	(Australia) J Alexander (Australia) J Fitzgerald	2	4
(West Germany) B Becker (West Germany) A Maurer	6	6
(United States) T Mayotte (United States) B Scanlon	6	3	2
(United States) P Annacone (South Africa) C van Rensburg	4	6	6

Quarterfinals
(United Kingdom) C Dowdeswell (United Kingdom) J Lloyd	2	4
(Australia) P McNamara (United States) L Shiras	6	6
(West Germany) B Becker (West Germany) A Maurer	6	7	6
(United States) P Annacone (South Africa) C van Rensburg	7	6	7

Semifinals
(Australia) P McNamara (United States) L Shiras	6	6	4
(United States) P Annacone (South Africa) C van Rensburg	4	7	6

=== Bottom half ===
First round
5	(Australia) P Doohan (Australia) M Fancutt	6	7	5
(United States) M De Palmer (United States) S Giammalva Jr.	7	6	7
(United States) E Sherbeck (United States) E Van't Hof	7	7
(United States) J Mattke (United States) H Sands	6	6
(Sweden) R Båthman (West Germany) S Hermann	6	3
(United States) To Gullikson (United States) S McCain	7	6
8	(Australia) D Graham (Australia) L Warder	6	6	7
(New Zealand) D Mustard (United Kingdom) J Smith	7	4	6
(United States) A Andrews (United States) C Wittus	4	4
(United States) S Denton (United States) H Pfister	6	6
(United States) M Freeman (Paraguay) F González	6	7
(Australia) D Cahill (Australia) D Carter	1	5

Second round
(United States) M De Palmer (United States) S Giammalva Jr.	6	7
(United States) E Sherbeck (United States) E Van't Hof	4	6
(United States) To Gullikson (United States) S McCain	6	6	7
4	(Australia) B Drewett (Australia) K Warwick	3	7	6
8	(Australia) D Graham (Australia) L Warder	4	4
(United States) S Denton (United States) H Pfister	6	6
(United States) M Freeman (Paraguay) F González	3	4
2	(Australia) B Dyke (Australia) W Masur	6	6

Quarterfinals
(United States) M De Palmer (United States) S Giammalva Jr.	3	7	2
(United States) To Gullikson (United States) S McCain	6	6	6
(United States) S Denton (United States) H Pfister	6	5	6
2	(Australia) B Dyke (Australia) W Masur	4	7	4

Semifinals
(United States) To Gullikson (United States) S McCain	6	7
(United States) S Denton (United States) H Pfister	4	6
