= 1984 NSW Building Society Open – Women's singles =

Women's singles
- 1984 NSW Building Society Open

Final
- Champion: (United States) Martina Navratilova
- Runner-up: (United States) Ann Henricksson
- Score: 6–1, 6–1

Details
- Draw: 56 (7Q/3LL)
- Seeds: 14

Events
Singles	men	women
Doubles	men	women
← 1983 ·	Sydney International	· 1985 →

Jo Durie was the defending champion, but lost in the third round to Claudia Kohde-Kilsch.

Martina Navratilova won the title by defeating Ann Henricksson 6–1, 6–1 in the final.

== Seeds ==
The first eight seeds received a bye into the second round.

1. (United States) Martina Navratilova (champion)
2. (United States) Pam Shriver (third round)
3. (Australia) Wendy Turnbull (semifinals)
4. (West Germany) Claudia Kohde-Kilsch (quarterfinals)
5. (United States) Zina Garrison (semifinals)
6. (Canada) Carling Bassett (second round)
7. (Czechoslovakia) Helena Suková (second round)
8. (Sweden) Catarina Lindqvist (second round)
9. (United Kingdom) Jo Durie (third round)
10. (West Germany) Steffi Graf (third round)
11. (West Germany) Bettina Bunge (third round)
12. (France) Catherine Tanvier (second round)
13. (West Germany) Eva Pfaff (first round)
14. (United States) Camille Benjamin (second round)

== Draw ==
=== Key ===
- Q = Qualifier
- WC = Wild card
- LL = Lucky loser
- Alt = Alternate
- SE = Special exempt
- PR = Protected ranking
- ITF = ITF entry
- JE = Junior exempt
- w/o = Walkover
- r = Retired
- d = Defaulted
- SR = Special ranking

=== Finals ===
Quarterfinals
1	(United States) Martina Navratilova	6	6
(South Africa) Yvonne Vermaak	3	2
4	(West Germany) Claudia Kohde-Kilsch	3	6
5	(United States) Zina Garrison	6	7
(United States) Gigi Fernández	2	1
3	(Australia) Wendy Turnbull	6	6
(United States) Ann Henricksson	7	6
(Netherlands) Marcella Mesker	5	4

Semifinals
1	(United States) Martina Navratilova	6	6
5	(United States) Zina Garrison	2	1
3	(Australia) Wendy Turnbull	6	5	4
(United States) Ann Henricksson	1	7	6

Final
1	(United States) Martina Navratilova	6	6
(United States) Ann Henricksson	1	1

=== Top half ===
==== Section 1 ====
First round
(United States) ML Piatek	6	6
(United States) B Nagelsen	4	2
Q	(France) C Suire	6	0	6
LL	(Soviet Union) L Savchenko	3	6	2
(Czechoslovakia) I Budařová	0	3
(United States) S Walsh	6	6
13	(West Germany) E Pfaff	6	6	3
(Switzerland) C Jolissaint	4	7	6
(Denmark) T Scheuer-Larsen	7	6
(West Germany) M Schropp	5	1
(South Africa) Y Vermaak	6	7
(United States) A White	4	6

Second round
1	(United States) M Navratilova	6	6
(United States) ML Piatek	4	2
Q	(France) C Suire	1	2
(United States) S Walsh	6	6
(Switzerland) C Jolissaint	6	6
(Denmark) T Scheuer-Larsen	2	2
(South Africa) Y Vermaak	6	6
7	(Czechoslovakia) H Suková	4	3

Third round
1	(United States) M Navratilova	6	7
(United States) S Walsh	4	5
(Switzerland) C Jolissaint	3	3
(South Africa) Y Vermaak	6	6

Quarterfinals
1	(United States) M Navratilova	6	6
(South Africa) Y Vermaak	3	2

==== Section 2 ====
First round
(Sweden) C Karlsson	6	6
(United States) S Collins	4	2
(United Kingdom) A Croft	6	6
Q	(United Kingdom) A Brown	7	7
(United States) E Burgin	4	7	5
9	(United Kingdom) J Durie	6	6	7
11	(West Germany) B Bunge	7	7
(Australia) D Balestrat	6	6
(Argentina) A Villagrán	4	4
LL	(United States) L Antonoplis	6	6
(Australia) A Minter	6	7
(United States) S Foltz	4	5

Second round
4	(West Germany) C Kohde-Kilsch	6	6
(Sweden) C Karlsson	2	0
Q	(United Kingdom) A Brown	1	2
9	(United Kingdom) J Durie	6	6
11	(West Germany) B Bunge	6	6
LL	(United States) L Antonoplis	0	0
(Australia) A Minter	4	2
5	(United States) Z Garrison	6	6

Third round
4	(West Germany) C Kohde-Kilsch	7	6
9	(United Kingdom) J Durie	5	4
11	(West Germany) B Bunge	3	5
5	(United States) Z Garrison	6	7

Quarterfinals
4	(West Germany) C Kohde-Kilsch	3	6
5	(United States) Z Garrison	6	7

=== Bottom half ===
==== Section 3 ====
First round
(United States) G Fernández	6	6
(United States) K Shaefer	2	1
(United Kingdom) V Wade	0	6	1
(France) P Paradis	6	1	6
LL	(United States) B Gerken	6	6
Q	(Australia) B Remilton	4	3
10	(West Germany) S Graf	7	4	6
Q	(United States) L Howell	5	6	3
(South Africa) R Fairbank	7	6
(United Kingdom) S Barker	5	3
Q	(United States) L McNeil	7	7
(United States) W White	6	5

Second round
6	(Canada) C Bassett	1	2
(United States) G Fernández	6	6
(France) P Paradis	7	6
LL	(United States) B Gerken	6	2
10	(West Germany) S Graf	0	6	6
(South Africa) R Fairbank	6	4	4
Q	(United States) L McNeil	1	1
3	(Australia) W Turnbull	6	6

Third round
(United States) G Fernández	6	7
(France) P Paradis	4	5
10	(West Germany) S Graf	2	5
3	(Australia) W Turnbull	6	7

Quarterfinals
(United States) G Fernández	2	1
3	(Australia) W Turnbull	6	6

==== Section 4 ====
First round
Q	(United States) R White	6	7
Q	(Australia) A Tobin-Dingwall	3	5
(United States) A Henricksson	6	6
(Australia) R Bryant	4	4
(United States) M Washington	1	2
14	(United States) C Benjamin	6	6
12	(France) C Tanvier	6	6
(West Germany) P Keppeler	1	3
(Netherlands) M Mesker	6	6	6
(Switzerland) L Drescher	3	7	2
(United States) V Nelson	6	6	2
(South Africa) B Mould	4	7	6

Second round
8	(Sweden) C Lindqvist	6	3	3
Q	(United States) R White	4	6	6
(United States) A Henricksson	6	6
14	(United States) C Benjamin	3	1
12	(France) C Tanvier	6	6	5
(Netherlands) M Mesker	7	1	7
(South Africa) B Mould	5	0
2	(United States) P Shriver	7	6

Third round
Q	(United States) R White	6	2
(United States) A Henricksson	7	6
(Netherlands) M Mesker	5	7	6
2	(United States) P Shriver	7	6	4

Quarterfinals
(United States) A Henricksson	7	6
(Netherlands) M Mesker	5	4
