= 1982 NSW Building Society Open =

- Date: 22–28 November
- Edition: 91st
- Category: Toyota Series (Cat 4)
- Draw: 56S / 32D
- Prize money: $125,000
- Surface: Grass
- Location: Sydney, Australia
- Venue: White City Stadium

Champions

Singles
- (United States) Martina Navratilova

Doubles
- (United States) Martina Navratilova / (United States) Pam Shriver\
- Sydney International

The 1982 NSW Building Society Open was a women's tennis tournament played on outdoor grass courts at the White City Stadium in Sydney, Australia that was part of the 1982 Avon Championships World Championship Series. It was the 91st edition of the tournament and was held from 22 November through 28 November 1982. First-seeded Navratilova won the singles title and earned $22,000 first-prize money.

== Finals ==
=== Singles ===
(United States) Martina Navratilova defeated (Australia) Evonne Goolagong Cawley 6–0, 3–6, 6–1

- It was Navratilova's 14th singles title of the year and the 69th of her career.

=== Doubles ===
(United States) Martina Navratilova / (United States) Pam Shriver defeated (West Germany) Eva Pfaff / (West Germany) Claudia Kohde-Kilsch 6–2, 2–6, 7–6

- It was Navratilova's 12th doubles title of the year and the 77th of her career. It was Shriver's 11th doubles title of the year and the 29th of her career.
