= 1984 NSW Building Society Open – Women's doubles =

Women's doubles
- 1984 NSW Building Society Open

Final
- Champions: (West Germany) Claudia Kohde-Kilsch (Czechoslovakia) Helena Suková
- Runners-up: (Australia) Wendy Turnbull (United States) Sharon Walsh
- Score: 6–2, 7–6

Details
- Draw: 32
- Seeds: 8

Events
Singles	men	women
Doubles	men	women
← 1983 ·	Sydney International	· 1985 →

Anne Hobbs and Wendy Turnbull were the defending champions, but Hobbs did not compete this year.

Turnbull teamed up with Sharon Walsh and lost in the final to Claudia Kohde-Kilsch and Helena Suková.-The score was 6–2, 7–6.

== Seeds ==
1. (Australia) Wendy Turnbull / (United States) Sharon Walsh (final)
2. (West Germany) Claudia Kohde-Kilsch / (Czechoslovakia) Helena Suková (champions)
3. (United States) Betsy Nagelsen / (United States) Anne White (second round)
4. (n/a)
5. (United Kingdom) Jo Durie / (France) Catherine Tanvier (quarterfinals)
6. (n/a)
7. (South Africa) Rosalyn Fairbank / (United States) Candy Reynolds (semifinals)
8. (West Germany) Bettina Bunge / (West Germany) Eva Pfaff (quarterfinals)

== Draw ==
=== Key ===
- Q = Qualifier
- WC = Wild card
- LL = Lucky loser
- Alt = Alternate
- SE = Special exempt
- PR = Protected ranking
- ITF = ITF entry
- JE = Junior exempt
- w/o = Walkover
- r = Retired
- d = Defaulted
- SR = Special ranking

=== Finals ===
Semifinals
1	(Australia) Wendy Turnbull (United States) Sharon Walsh	5	6	6
7	(South Africa) Rosalyn Fairbank (United States) Candy Reynolds	7	3	3
(Australia) Anne Minter (Australia) Elizabeth Minter	3	4
2	(West Germany) Claudia Kohde-Kilsch (Czechoslovakia) Helena Suková	6	6

Final
1	(Australia) Wendy Turnbull (United States) Sharon Walsh	2	6
2	(West Germany) Claudia Kohde-Kilsch (Czechoslovakia) Helena Suková	6	7

=== Top half ===
First round
1	(Australia) W Turnbull (United States) S Walsh	6	6
(United States) L Antonoplis (United Kingdom) V Wade	0	3
(Switzerland) C Jolissaint (Netherlands) M Mesker	6	6
(United States) ML Piatek (United States) K Shaefer	2	2
(United States) G Fernández (West Germany) S Graf	4	7	6
(United States) V Nelson (Argentina) A Villagrán	6	6	3
(United States) L Howell (United States) F Raschiatore	2	1
5	(United Kingdom) J Durie (France) C Tanvier	6	6
(Australia) N Gregory (Japan) E Okagawa	6	2
(Australia) R Bryant (Australia) J Byrne	7	6
(United States) B Gerken (United States) M Quinlan	4	5
(France) S Amiach (France) C Vanier	6	7
(Australia) C O'Neil (Australia) P Whytcross	2	2
7	(South Africa) R Fairbank (United States) C Reynolds	6	6
(United States) H Crowe (United States) K Steinmetz	2	6	6
(New Zealand) B Cordwell (United States) M Van Nostrand	6	3	4

Second round
1	(Australia) W Turnbull (United States) S Walsh	3	6	7
(Switzerland) C Jolissaint (Netherlands) M Mesker	6	2	6
(United States) G Fernández (West Germany) S Graf	1	2
5	(United Kingdom) J Durie (France) C Tanvier	6	6
(Australia) R Bryant (Australia) J Byrne	2	6	6
(France) S Amiach (France) C Vanier	6	3	7
7	(South Africa) R Fairbank (United States) C Reynolds	2	6	6
(United States) H Crowe (United States) K Steinmetz	6	3	4

Quarterfinals
1	(Australia) W Turnbull (United States) S Walsh	6	6	6
5	(United Kingdom) J Durie (France) C Tanvier	7	2	3
(France) S Amiach (France) C Vanier	3	5
7	(South Africa) R Fairbank (United States) C Reynolds	6	7

Semifinals
1	(Australia) W Turnbull (United States) S Walsh	5	6	6
7	(South Africa) R Fairbank (United States) C Reynolds	7	3	3

=== Bottom half ===
First round
(Sweden) C Jexell (Denmark) T Scheuer-Larsen	7	4	6
(France) P Paradis (France) C Suire	6	6	2
(United States) C Benjamin (Czechoslovakia) I Budařová	6	6	4
(Australia) B Remilton (Japan) N Sato	7	2	6
(Australia) A Gulley (Australia) A Tobin-Dingwall	6	6	4
(Australia) A Minter (Australia) E Minter	7	2	6
(South Africa) J Mundel (South Africa) Y Vermaak	1	3
3	(United States) B Nagelsen (United States) A White	6	6
8	(West Germany) B Bunge (West Germany) E Pfaff	6	7
(United States) E Burgin (United States) S Collins	3	5
(Canada) H Pelletier (United States) W White	0	6	7
(United Kingdom) S Gomer (United Kingdom) J Salmon	6	2	5
(South Africa) I Kloss (United States) L McNeil	7	6	1
(United States) A Henricksson (United States) R White	6	7	6
(Soviet Union) S Cherneva (Soviet Union) L Savchenko	4	2
2	(West Germany) C Kohde-Kilsch (Czechoslovakia) H Suková	6	6

Second round
(Sweden) C Jexell (Denmark) T Scheuer-Larsen	7	6
(Australia) B Remilton (Japan) N Sato	5	2
(Australia) A Minter (Australia) E Minter	6	5	6
3	(United States) B Nagelsen (United States) A White	4	7	4
8	(West Germany) B Bunge (West Germany) E Pfaff	6	6
(Canada) H Pelletier (United States) W White	2	3
(United States) A Henricksson (United States) R White	1	3
2	(West Germany) C Kohde-Kilsch (Czechoslovakia) H Suková	6	6

Quarterfinals
(Sweden) C Jexell (Denmark) T Scheuer-Larsen	4	2
(Australia) A Minter (Australia) E Minter	6	6
8	(West Germany) B Bunge (West Germany) E Pfaff	6	3	4
2	(West Germany) C Kohde-Kilsch (Czechoslovakia) H Suková	4	6	6

Semifinals
(Australia) A Minter (Australia) E Minter	3	4
2	(West Germany) C Kohde-Kilsch (Czechoslovakia) H Suková	6	6
