= 1980 New South Wales Open =

- Date: 1–7 December 1980 (W); 15–21 December 1980 (M)
- Edition: 88th
- Category: Grand Prix (M); Colgate Series (W)
- Draw: 64S / 32D
- Prize money: $125,000
- Surface: Grass / outdoor
- Location: Sydney, Australia
- Venue: White City Stadium

Champions

Men's singles
- (United States) Fritz Buehning

Women's singles
- (Australia) Wendy Turnbull

Men's doubles
- (Australia) Peter McNamara / (Australia) Paul McNamee

Women's doubles
- (United States) Pam Shriver / (Netherlands) Betty Stöve
- New South Wales Open

The 1980 New South Wales Open was a combined men's and women's tennis tournament played on outdoor grass courts at the White City Stadium in Sydney, Australia. The men's event, also known by its sponsored name Nabisco NSW Open, was part of the 1980 Volvo Grand Prix circuitand was held from 15 December through 21 December 1980. The women's event, also known by its sponsored name NSW Building Society Classic, was part of the 1980 Colgate Series and was held from 1 December through 7 December 1980. It was the 88th edition of the event. The singles titles were won by unseeded Fritz Buehning and third-seeded Wendy Turnbull.

== Finals ==
=== Men's singles ===
(United States) Fritz Buehning defeated (United States) Brian Teacher 6–3, 6–7, 7–6

=== Women's singles ===
(Australia) Wendy Turnbull defeated (United States) Pam Shriver 3–6, 6–4, 7–6^{(10–8)}

=== Men's doubles ===
(Australia) Peter McNamara / (Australia) Paul McNamee defeated (United States) Vitas Gerulaitis / (United States) Brian Gottfried 6–2, 6–4

=== Women's doubles ===
(United States) Pam Shriver / (Netherlands) Betty Stöve defeated (United States) Rosie Casals / (Australia) Wendy Turnbull 6–1, 4–6, 6–4
