= 1970 New South Wales Open =

- Date: 16–22 March
- Edition: 78th
- Prize money: AUS$25,000
- Surface: Grass / outdoor
- Location: Sydney, Australia
- Venue: White City Stadium

Champions

Men's singles
- (Australia) Rod Laver

Women's singles
- (United States) Billie Jean King

Men's doubles
- (Australia) Ken Rosewall / (Australia) Fred Stolle
- New South Wales Open

The 1970 New South Wales Open, also known by its sponsored name Dunlop Open, was a combined men's and women's tennis tournament played on outdoor grass courts at the White City Stadium in Sydney, Australia. The tournament was held from 16 March through 22 March 1970. It was the 78th edition of the event and the second held in the Open era of tennis. The men's event consisted of a singles and doubles competition while the women only played a singles competition. The singles titles were won by Billie Jean King and Rod Laver who were both seeded first. It was Laver's second singles title after 1961 and he won AUS$5,000 first-prize money.

== Finals ==
=== Men's singles ===
(Australia) Rod Laver defeated (Australia) Ken Rosewall 3–6, 6–2, 3–6, 6–2, 6–3

=== Women's singles ===
(United States) Billie Jean King defeated (Australia) Margaret Court 6–2, 4–6, 6–3

=== Men's doubles ===
(Australia) Ken Rosewall / (Australia) Fred Stolle defeated (Australia) Bill Bowrey / (United Kingdom) Roger Taylor 6–3, 7–5
