= 1984 NSW Building Society Open =

- Date: 10–16 December (men); 19–25 November (women)
- Edition: 93rd
- Prize money: $125,000 (men) $150,000 (women)
- Surface: Grass
- Location: Sydney, Australia
- Venue: White City Stadium

Champions

Men's singles
- (Australia) John Fitzgerald

Women's singles
- (United States) Martina Navratilova

Men's doubles
- (United States) Paul Annacone / (South Africa) Christo van Rensburg

Women's doubles
- (West Germany) Claudia Kohde-Kilsch / (Czechoslovakia) Helena Suková
- NSW Building Society Open

The 1984 NSW Building Society Open was a combined men's and women's tennis tournament played on outdoor grass courts at the White City Stadium in Sydney, Australia that was part of the 1984 Volvo Grand Prix and the 1984 Virginia Slims World Championship Series. The women's tournament was held from 19 November through 25 November 1984. The men's tournament was held from 10 December through 16 December 1984. John Fitzgerald and Martina Navratilova won the singles titles.

== Finals ==
=== Men's singles ===
(Australia) John Fitzgerald defeated (United States) Sammy Giammalva Jr. 6–3, 6–3

- It was Fitzgerald's 2nd title of the year and the 12th of his career.

=== Women's singles ===
(United States) Martina Navratilova defeated (United States) Ann Henricksson 6–1, 6–1

- It was Navratilova's 13th singles title of the year and the 99th of her career.

=== Men's doubles ===
(United States) Paul Annacone / (South Africa) Christo van Rensburg defeated (United States) Tom Gullikson / (United States) Scott McCain 7–6, 7–5

- It was Annacone's 1st career title. It was Van Rensburg's only title of the year and the 2nd of his career.

=== Women's doubles ===
(West Germany) Claudia Kohde-Kilsch / (Czechoslovakia) Helena Suková defeated (Australia) Wendy Turnbull / (United States) Sharon Walsh 6–2, 7–6

- It was Kohde-Kilsch's 5th title of the year and the 11th of her career. It was Suková's 5th title of the year and the 6th of her career.
