= 1969 New South Wales Open – Women's singles =

Women's singles
- 1969 New South Wales Open
- 1968 Champion: (United States) Judy Tegart

Final
- Champion: (Australia) Margaret Court
- Runner-up: (United States) Rosie Casals
- Score: 6–1, 6–2

Events
Singles	men	women
Doubles	men	women
- New South Wales Open

Margaret Court defeated Rosie Casals 6–1, 6–2 to win the women's singles tennis title at the 1969 New South Wales Open.

Judy Tegart was the defending champion but lost in the quarter-finals to Billie Jean King.

== Draw ==
Key

- Q = Qualifier
- WC = Wild card
- LL = Lucky loser
- Alt = Alternate
- ITF = ITF entry
- PR = Protected ranking
- SR = Special ranking
- SE = Special exempt
- JE = Junior exempt
- JR = Junior Accelerator Programme entrant
- CO = College Accelerator Programme entrant
- NG = Next Gen Accelerator Program entrant
- w/o = Walkover
- r = Retired
- d = Defaulted

=== Finals ===
Semi-finals
(United States) Billie Jean King	3	7	5
(United States) Rosie Casals	6	5	7
(Australia) Kerry Melville	3	0
(Australia) Margaret Court	6	6

Final
(United States) Rosie Casals	1	2
(Australia) Margaret Court	6	6
