= Barney Murphy =

Australian sportsman (1874–1943)

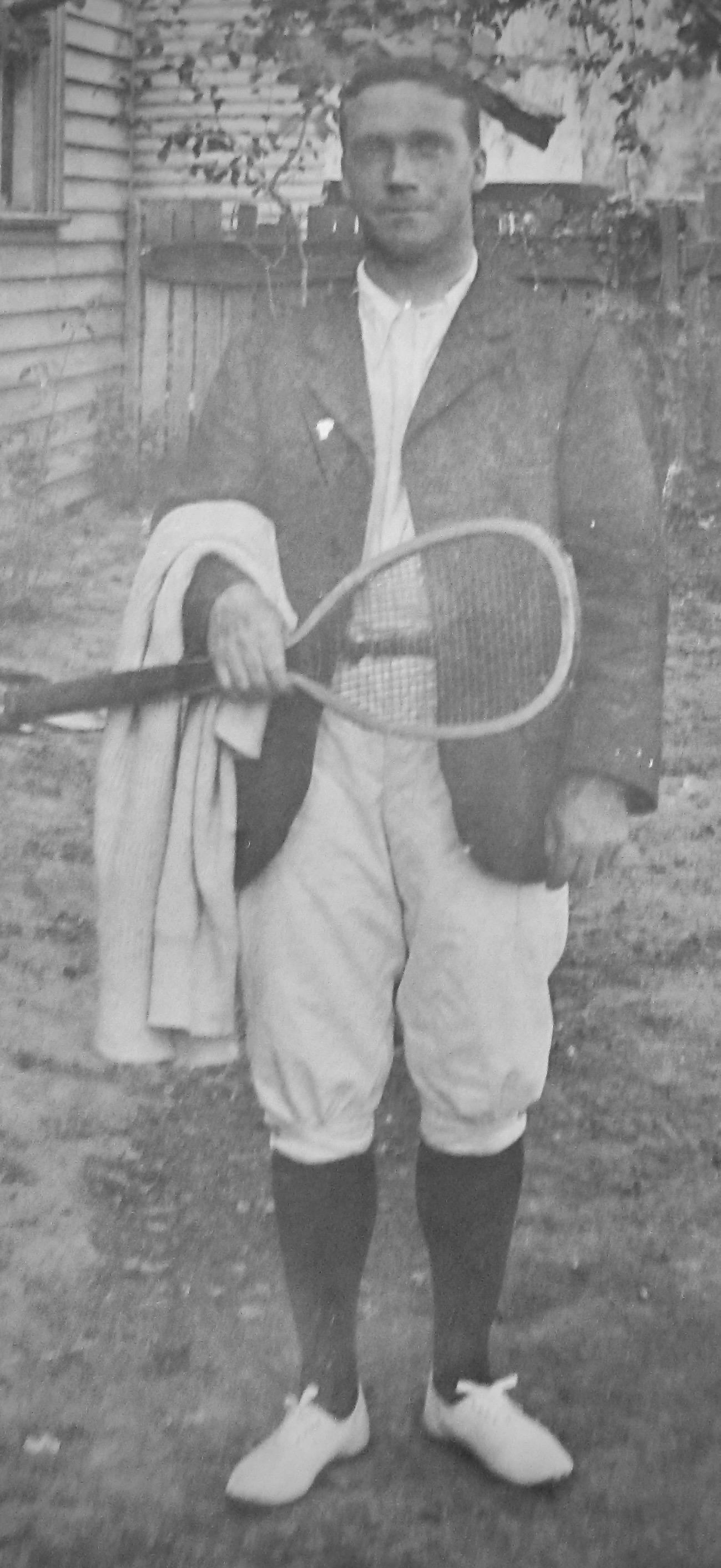

Personal information
- Nationality: Australian
- Born: Andrew Bernard Murphy; 11 May 1874 Geelong, Victoria, Australia
- Died: 23 September 1943 (Age 69) Lilydale, Victoria, Australia
- Education: Geelong Grammar School (1888–1890)
- Spouse: Jessie May Murphy (nee Tulloch)

Sport
- Sport: Tennis (1897–1910)|Australian rules football (1891,1895–1896)
- Club: Geelong Football Club (1891,1895-1896)

Andrew Bernard "Barney" Murphy (1874–1943) was an Australian tennis player who achieved considerable success during the pioneering era of international tennis. One of Australia's leading players in the early 1900s, Murphy represented Victoria in interstate competition for nearly a decade (including being captain in 1906) and was selected for the inaugural Australasian International test team against England in 1905. He undertook an extensive European tennis tour in 1905, competing at Wimbledon and winning multiple championship titles across Belgium and England.

Murphy also played Australian rules football for Geelong in the Victorian Football Association (VFA).

== Domestic achievements ==
Murphy achieved considerable success in Australian tennis competitions during the early 1900s. He reached the singles finals of both the New South Wales Championships in 1903 and the Victorian Championships in 1904, Australia's two premier tennis tournaments of the time. He also reached the doubles finals of the New South Wales Championships in 1903.

Murphy regularly represented Victoria in interstate competitions from 1901 to 1910, competing in matches in 1901, 1902, 1903, 1904, 1906, 1908, and 1910. These contests were the premier tennis events of the day, attracting thousands of spectators over several days of continuous play. Murphy captained the Victorian team against New South Wales in 1906.

Murphy's other domestic successes included winning the Geelong Easter Tournament Handicap singles in 1897 and the Championship singles in 1902. He also won the Lawn Tennis Association of Victoria's annual tournament, the Metropolitan Championship of Melbourne doubles, in 1903 and 1910.

== International career ==
Murphy was selected for the inaugural Australasian International test team to compete against England in 1905. This selection came during his European tour, which included competition at Wimbledon and various continental tournaments.

== 1905 Wimbledon Championships ==
Murphy had been predicted to do well at Wimbledon as 'his methods' were expected to 'be suited by the game played by most of the English players'. However, Murphy 'went down badly' to M.J.G. Ritchie, his first opponent in the All-Comers' singles, losing in straight sets, although it was later reported that 'he would not have had much more than a week to recover from the voyage home, and could not possibly have got into form and condition in so short a time'. He subsequently reached the final of the Wimbledon Plate, where he lost to Wilberforce Eaves in two sets.

Murphy also competed in the All-Comers' doubles, partnering with K. Doust from the USA. The pair won their first match, before losing to English twins, Wilfred and Herbert Baddeley in the second round, in four sets.

== Australasia versus England ==
Murphy, Wilberforce Eaves and Harry Parker combined with the members of the inaugural Australasia Davis Cup team, Norman Brookes, Anthony Wilding and Alfred Dunlop, to form the Australasian International team to play against an English team. This 'test' match was played at Wimbledon on 31 July 1905, after completion of the Davis Cup.

In the singles, England won four rubbers to Australasia's two, while in the doubles, England won all three rubbers. The overall score was recorded as: England - 7 rubbers, 18 sets, 131 games beat Australasia - 2 rubbers, 5 sets, 76 games. Murphy played M.J.G. Ritchie in the singles, losing in two sets. In doubles, Murphy teamed with Wilberforce Eaves against the English pair of M.J.G. Ritchie and Arthur Gore, losing in three sets.

Although the score represented a comprehensive victory to England, the Australasian International team performed above expectation, with one English newspaper commenting: "Enough has hardly been made of the remarkable skill shown by the Australians. They came to us, like the first Australian cricket team, with no reputation, and although, like the cricketers, they were beaten, they have made a sensation, and have abundantly convinced everybody that we shall not be allowed to rest on our laurels."

== European tour of 1905 ==
Murphy's 1905 European tour included successful campaigns at several continental tournaments. He won singles titles at the Championships of Liège, Championships of Spa, and Championships of Antwerp. He also claimed doubles victories at the Championships of Oostende (partnering Harry Parker), Championships of Liège, and the South of England Championships (partnering Norman Brookes, Australia's finest player of the era).

At the Championships of Oostende in early August, Murphy and Parker defeated Anthony Wilding and Louis Trasenster in the doubles final. Of the match, Wilding recounted: "I played with Louis Trasenster (the Belgian) in the doubles, and we got to the final, and then lost to Parker and Murphy (Australian) after being one set up and five games to four, 40-30. It was, however, quite a good match." The tournament was notable for the attendance of the Archduchess of Austria, who presented prizes to winners.

On August 18, ahead of the Championships of Spa, Murphy wrote to a friend: "Am now in Spa. Came over from Liege to here in motor car with Baron Forgeur and am playing in tournament with Count de Robiano." Murphy also referenced his successful time in Ostende earlier in the month, including his interactions with European nobility: "Have had the pleasure (at Ostende) of the Archduchess of Austria asking to be introduced to me and saying I (my tennis) was magnifique. Have dined three times with the Count de Boessierre. Quite a great list, isn't it? But my head is not a bit turned." In the letter, Murphy listed his tennis successes to date, which included 5 tournament wins and 13 prizes, and then added: "Not bad, considering I never go to bed until daylight every morning."

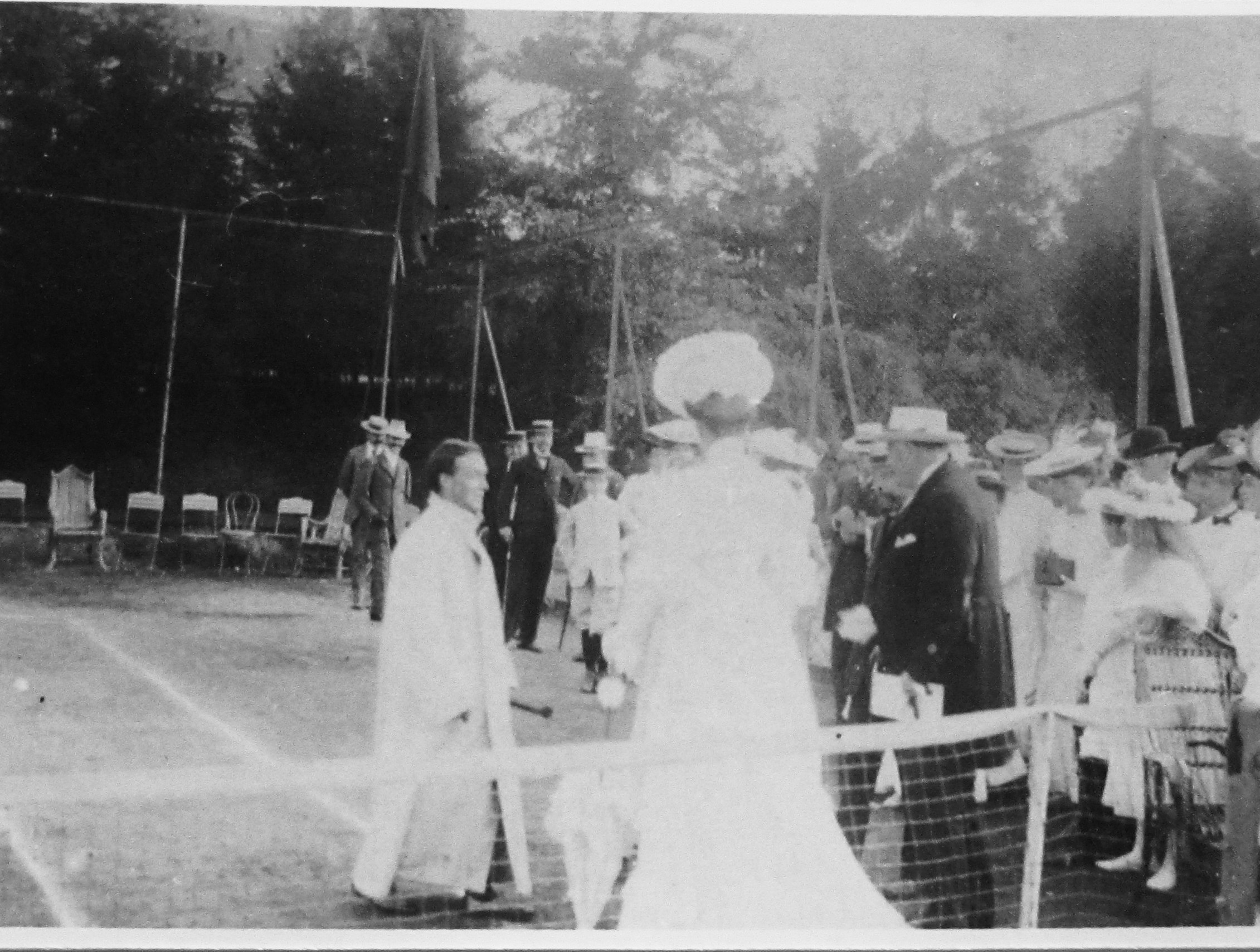
Murphy receiving the Spa Championship trophy

Murphy finished the letter after the Spa tournament had concluded: "Since writing, I have won the Challenge Cup of Spa and have had the pleasure of being introduced to H.R.H. Princess Clementine, daughter of the King of Belgium. She came to see the final between Le Maire and myself. It was a great go (2-6 6-3 4-6 6-3 6-0), and it was frightfully hot. I was just walking off the court when Viscount A. de Nieulant called me back and said the princess wished to speak to me. She was very nice, and we had quite a long talk. It was the first time she had ever been to the Spa Tennis Club."

== Playing style ==
Murphy was characterised by contemporary observers as a consistent player with exceptional defensive abilities. A. Wallis Myers, in his 1903 work 'Lawn Tennis at Home and Abroad', described Murphy as 'a sturdy, plodding, unambitious little player, quite content to get everything back. A stone-waller, a long distance performer, and a very hard man to beat.'

It is noteworthy that the author of the Australian chapter in Wallis Myers' book was Les Poidevin, a regular member of the New South Wales state tennis team.

== Australian rules football career ==
=== Career ===
Murphy played Australian rules football for Geelong Football Club in the Victorian Football Association during the 1891, 1895, and 1896 seasons. Over his three-season career, he appeared in 17 matches and scored 10 goals. His most prolific season was 1895, when he was consistently in the team and his many notable performances made him a regular subject of newspaper match reports, with journalists frequently commenting on his clever play and courage in the forward line.

=== Playing style ===
Notwithstanding the fact he was regularly described by journalists as 'little Murphy' due to his small stature, Murphy was regarded as a skilled and courageous forward. Contemporary match reports praised him as being a 'fine little footballer', with specific emphasis on his creativity around goal 'where this little man was as clever as usual.' He was noted for his agility in evading defenders, with one report highlighting how he dodged 'the Essendon backs very cleverly.'

Murphy demonstrated considerable courage on the field, with one 1895 match report noting that he 'stood up to the biggest of his foes like a man.' His absence from the team was considered significant enough to be cited as a contributing factor in defeats, indicating his importance to Geelong's forward structure.

==== Geelong Football Team at Corio Oval, 1895 ====
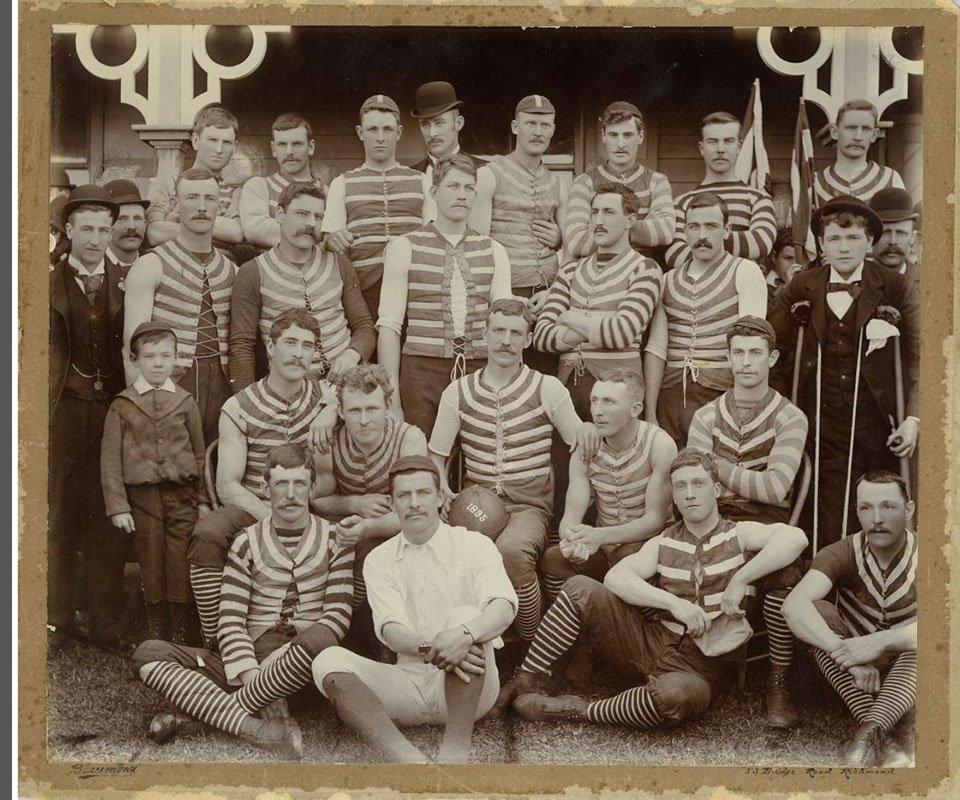
Barney Murphy: front row, second from right
