= Granville G. Sharp =

Australian tennis player

- Full name: Granville Gilbert Sharp
- Country (sports): Australia
- Born: 13 July 1878; Adelaide, South Australia, Australia
- Died: 19 February 1964 (aged 85); Sydney, New South Wales, Australia

Doubles

Grand Slam doubles results
- Australian Open: F (1908)

Granville Gilbert Sharp was an Australian tennis player. He was a runner-up in doubles alongside Anthony Wilding at the Australasian Championships (current Australian Open) in 1908. He won the New South Wales Championships three times.

== Tennis career ==
Sharp started playing tennis in his boyhood, practicing his shots against a wall. In 1896 he played for New South Wales in an interstate match against Victoria. Sharp won the singles title at the New South Wales Championships in 1903, defeating Barney Murphy in the final in straight sets. The following year, 1904, he successfully defend his title after another straight-sets victory in the final, this time against Horace Rice. His third consecutive title was won in 1906 against Stanley Doust. In 1909 he again reached the final but lost in five sets to Rodney Heath. Additionally, Sharp was the NSW doubles champion (1903-05), partnering G.W. Wright. He was a non-plying member of the Australasian Davis Cup team in 1909 who won the cup against the United States.

== Medical career ==
In September 1906 he travelled to England where he did postgraduate work in 1907 and 1908. When he returned to Sydney he became an honorary assistant physician at Royal Prince Alfred Hospital. From 1923 he practised as a consulting physician. In World War II he was involved in recruiting for the Royal Australian Air Force before joining the merchant navy as a ship's surgeon. After SS Nellore was sunk by a Japanese submarine in June 1944 he was adrift in the Indian Ocean for twelve days. After the war Sharp served as a medical officer on merchant ships until 1960.

== Personal life ==
He was educated at the Sydney Grammar School and subsequently enrolled at the University of Sydney (B.Sc., 1902; M.B., Ch.M., 1904; M.D., 1918). He married Jane Drummond Gordon (d.1942), née Blackmore in Sydney on 29 June 1911. They had three daughters. Sharp died in Sydney on 19 February 1964 at the age of 85.

== Grand Slam finals ==
=== Doubles (1 runner-up) ===
Result	Year	Championship	Surface	Partner	Opponents	Score
Loss	1908	Australian Championships	Grass	(New Zealand) Anthony Wilding	(United States) Fred Alexander (Australia) Alfred Dunlop	3–6, 2–6, 1–6
