= 1977 Marlboro NSW Open =

1977 New South Wales Open
- Date: 12–18 December 1977
- Edition: 85th
- Category: Grand Prix (Four star)
- Draw: 64S / 32D (M)
- Prize money: AUS$175,000
- Surface: Grass / outdoor
- Location: Sydney, Australia
- Venue: White City Stadium

Champions

Men's singles
- (United States) Roscoe Tanner

Women's singles
- (Australia) Evonne Goolagong Cawley

Men's doubles
- (Australia) John Alexander / (Australia) Phil Dent

Women's doubles
- (Australia) Evonne Goolagong Cawley / (Australia) Helen Gourlay Cawley
- New South Wales Open

The 1977 New South Wales Open, also known by its sponsored name Marlboro New South Wales Open, was a combined men's and women's tennis tournament played on outdoor grass courts at the White City Stadium in Sydney, Australia. The men's was part of the 1977 Colgate-Palmolive Grand Prix circuit. It was the 85th edition of the event and was held from 12 December through 18 January 1977. The singles titles were won by Evonne Goolagong Cawley and Roscoe Tanner. Defending champion Tony Roche was unable to participate due to a stomach muscle injury.

== Finals ==
=== Men's singles ===
(United States) Roscoe Tanner defeated (United States) Brian Teacher 6–3, 3–6, 6–3, 6–7, 6–4

=== Women's singles ===
(Australia) Evonne Goolagong Cawley defeated (United Kingdom) Sue Barker 6–2, 6–3

=== Men's doubles ===
(Australia) John Alexander / (Australia) Phil Dent defeated (Australia) Ray Ruffels / (Australia) Allan Stone 7–6, 2–6, 6–3

=== Women's doubles ===
(Australia) Evonne Goolagong Cawley / (Australia) Helen Gourlay Cawley defeated (United States) Mona Guerrant / (Australia) Kerry Reid 6–0, 6–0
