= 1976 Marlboro NSW Open =

1976 New South Wales Open
- Date: 26 December 1976 – 1 January 1977
- Edition: 84th
- Category: Grand Prix (Two star)
- Draw: 64S / 32D (M)
- Prize money: AUS$100,000
- Surface: Grass / outdoor
- Location: Sydney, Australia
- Venue: White City Stadium

Champions

Men's singles
- (Australia) Tony Roche

Women's singles
- (Australia) Kerry Reid

Men's doubles
- (Australia) Syd Ball / (Australia) Kim Warwick

Women's doubles
- (Australia) Helen Gourlay Cawley / (United States) Betsy Nagelsen
- New South Wales Open

The 1976 New South Wales Open, also known by its sponsored name Marlboro New South Wales Open, was a combined men's and women's tennis tournament played on outdoor grass courts at the White City Stadium in Sydney, Australia. The men's was part of the 1977 Colgate-Palmolive Grand Prix circuit. It was the 84th edition of the event and was held from 26 December 1976 through 1 January 1977. The singles titles were won by Kerry Reid and 33-year-old Tony Roche. It was Roche's fourth singles title after 1967, 1969 and 1974. Roche won AUS$13,500 first-prize money while Reid's title was rewarded with AUS$5,000 prize money.

== Finals ==
=== Men's singles ===
(Australia) Tony Roche defeated (United States) Dick Stockton 6–3, 3–6, 6–3, 6–4

=== Women's singles ===
(Australia) Kerry Reid defeated (Australia) Dianne Fromholtz 3–6, 6–3, 6–2

=== Men's doubles ===
(Australia) Syd Ball / (Australia) Kim Warwick defeated (Australia) Mark Edmondson / (Australia) John Marks 6–3, 6–4

=== Women's doubles ===
(Australia) Helen Gourlay Cawley / (United States) Betsy Nagelsen defeated (Australia) Dianne Fromholtz / (Czechoslovakia) Renáta Tomanová 6–4, 6–1
