= 1969 New South Wales Open =

- Date: 13–19 January
- Edition: 77th
- Surface: Grass / outdoor
- Location: Sydney, Australia
- Venue: White City Stadium

Champions

Men's singles
- (Australia) Tony Roche

Women's singles
- (Australia) Margaret Court

Men's doubles
- (Australia) Rod Laver / (Australia) Roy Emerson

Women's doubles
- (Australia) Margaret Court / (Australia) Judy Tegart
- New South Wales Open

The 1969 New South Wales Open was a combined men's and women's tennis tournament played on grass courts at the White City Stadium in Sydney, Australia. The tournament was held from 13 January through 19 January 1969. It was the 77th edition of the event and the first one in the Open era of tennis. The singles titles were won by Margaret Court and fourth-seeded Tony Roche. It was Roche's second singles title after 1967 and he won AUS$3,594 first-prize money. Court earned AUS$1,537 for her singles win which was her sixth singles title at the tournament.

== Finals ==
=== Men's singles ===
(Australia) Tony Roche defeated (Australia) Rod Laver 6–4, 4–6, 9–7, 12–10

=== Women's singles ===
(Australia) Margaret Court defeated (United States) Rosemary Casals 6–1, 6–2

=== Men's doubles ===
(Australia) Rod Laver / (Australia) Roy Emerson defeated (Australia) John Newcombe / (Australia) Tony Roche 10–12, 6–4, 6–3

=== Women's doubles ===
(Australia) Margaret Court / (Australia) Judy Tegart defeated (United States) Rosie Casals / (United States) Billie Jean King 15–13, 1–6, 6–3
