= 1978 New South Wales Open =

- Date: 18–24 December 1978
- Edition: 86th
- Category: Grand Prix (Four star)
- Draw: 64S/32D (M)
- Prize money: $100,000 (M) $35,000 (W)
- Surface: Grass / outdoor
- Location: Sydney, Australia
- Venue: White City Stadium

Champions

Men's singles
- (United States) Tim Wilkison

Women's singles
- (Australia) Dianne Fromholtz

Men's doubles
- (United States) Hank Pfister / (United States) Sherwood Stewart

Women's doubles
- (Australia) Lesley Hunt / (United States) Sharon Walsh
- New South Wales Open

The 1978 New South Wales Open, also known by its sponsored name Marlboro New South Wales Open, was a combined men's and women's tennis tournament played on outdoor grass courts at the White City Stadium in Sydney, Australia. The men's event was part of the 1978 Colgate-Palmolive Grand Prix circuit while the women's event was part of the 1979 Colgate Series. It was the 86th edition of the event and was held from 18 December through 24 December 1978. The singles titles were won by unseeded Tim Wilkison and second-seeded Dianne Fromholtz.

== Finals ==
=== Men's singles ===
(United States) Tim Wilkison defeated (New Zealand) Kim Warwick 6–3, 6–3, 6–7, 3–6, 6–2

=== Women's singles ===
(Australia) Dianne Fromholtz defeated (Australia) Wendy Turnbull 6–2, 7–5

=== Men's doubles ===
(United States) Hank Pfister / (United States) Sherwood Stewart defeated (Australia) Syd Ball / (Australia) Bob Carmichael 6–4, 6–4

=== Women's doubles ===
(Australia) Lesley Hunt / (United States) Sharon Walsh defeated (South Africa) Ilana Kloss / (South Africa) Marise Kruger 6–2, 6–1
