= 1908 Australasian Championships =

- Date: 7–12 December 1908
- Edition: 4th
- Category: Grand Slam
- Surface: Grass
- Location: Sydney, New South Wales, Australia
- Venue: Sydney Cricket Ground; Double Bay Grounds

Champions

Singles
- (United States) Fred Alexander

Doubles
- (United States) Fred Alexander / (Australia) Alfred Dunlop
- Australasian Championships

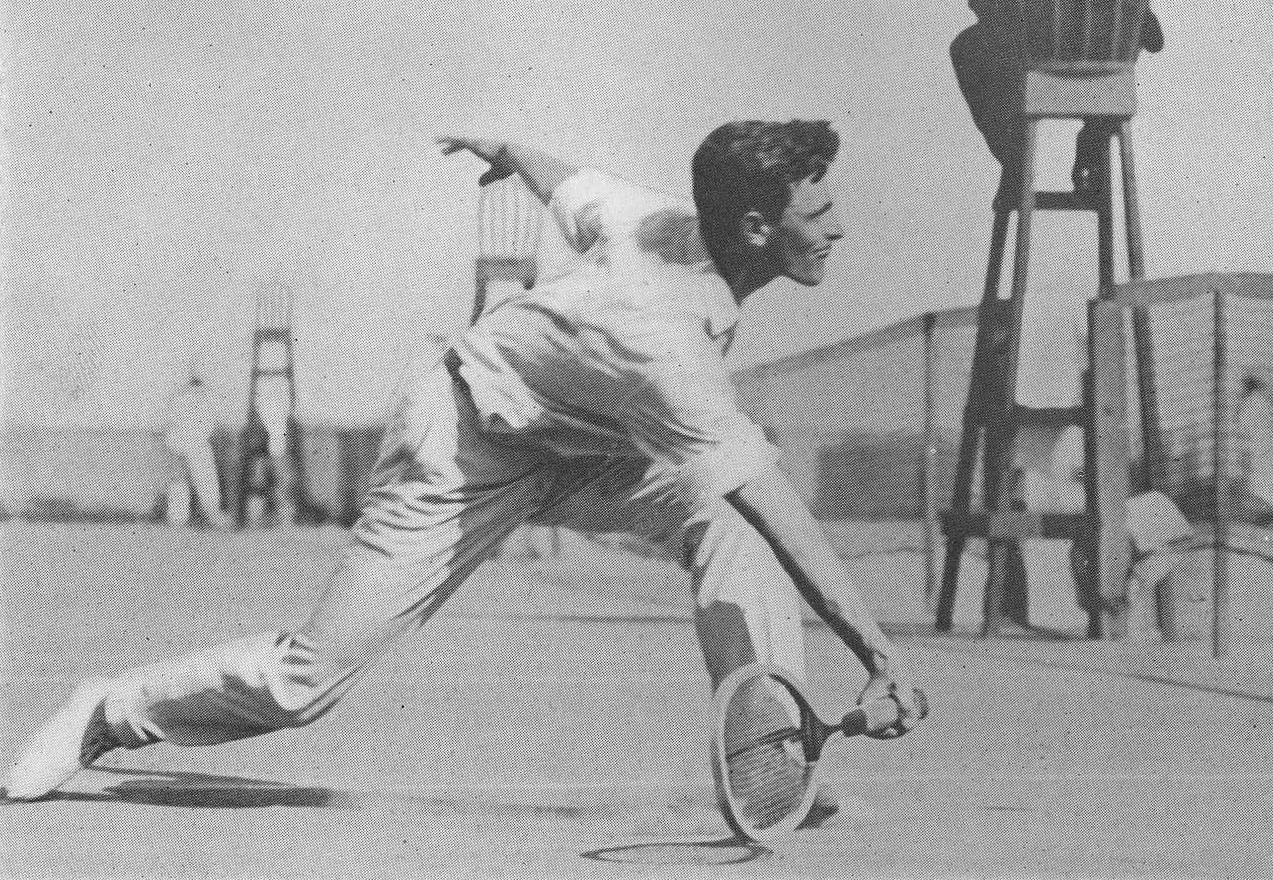
American tennis player Frederick Beasley Alexander

The 1908 Australasian Championships was a tennis tournament that took place on outdoor grass courts in Sydney, Australia. The preliminary rounds were played at the Sydney Cricket Ground while the final took place on the Double Bay Grounds. It was the fourth edition of the Australasian Championships (now known as the Australian Open), the first held in Sydney and the third Grand Slam tournament of the year. It consisted of a men's singles and doubles event. Fred Alexander won the singles event and became the first non-Australasian to win the title.

== Finals ==
=== Singles ===
(United States) Fred Alexander defeated (Australia) Alfred Dunlop 3–6, 3–6, 6–0, 6–2, 6–3

=== Doubles ===
(United States) Fred Alexander / (Australia) Alfred Dunlop defeated (Australia) Granville G. Sharp / (New Zealand) Anthony Wilding 6–3, 6–2, 6–1

Preceded by 1908 U.S. National Championships	Grand Slams	Succeeded by 1909 Wimbledon Championships
