= 1908 Australasian Championships – Singles =

Singles
- 1908 Australasian Championships

Final
- Champion: (United States) Fred Alexander
- Runner-up: (Australia) Alfred Dunlop
- Score: 3–6, 3–6, 6–0, 6–2, 6–3

Details
- Draw: 15
- Seeds: –

Events
Singles	Doubles
- Australasian Championships

Fred Alexander defeated Alfred Dunlop 3–6, 3–6, 6–0, 6–2, 6–3 in the final to win the men's singles tennis title at the 1908 Australasian Championships.

== Draw ==
=== Key ===
- Q = Qualifier
- WC = Wild card
- LL = Lucky loser
- r = Retired

First round
(United States) Fred Alexander	6	6	6
(Australia) Marsh	3	1	2
(Australia) Henry Gibbes	6	4	6	2	6
(Australia) J. Browne	4	6	1	6	3
(New Zealand) Harry Parker	6	6	6
(Australia) S. Jones	1	1	3
(Australia) F. Cupples	6	6	6
(Australia) V. V. Rudder	4	1	1
(Australia) Alfred Dunlop	6	6	6
(Australia) M. McKenzie	3	1	4
(Australia) Stanley Doust	6	6	6
(New Zealand) Francis Fisher	3	0	3
(Australia) Eric Pockley	2	3	6	6	11
(Australia) William Gregg	6	6	4	4	9

Second round
(United States) Fred Alexander	6	6	6
(Australia) Henry Gibbes	2	1	1
(New Zealand) Harry Parker	6	6	6
(Australia) F. Cupples	1	3	2
(Australia) Alfred Dunlop	6	6	4	8
(Australia) Stanley Doust	3	4	6	6
(Australia) Eric Pockley	7	1	7	7
(Australia) Percy Colquhoun	5	6	5	5

Semifinals
(United States) Fred Alexander	6	8	1	6
(New Zealand) Harry Parker	3	6	6	0
(Australia) Alfred Dunlop	6	6	6
(Australia) Eric Pockley	2	3	2

Final
(United States) Fred Alexander	3	3	6	6	6
(Australia) Alfred Dunlop	6	6	0	2	3

Preceded by 1908 U.S. National Championships	Grand Slam men's singles	Succeeded by 1909 Wimbledon Championships
