= Victorian Championships =

Defunct tennis tournament
- Tour: Pre-open era (1879–1967); Open era (1968–78)
- Founded: 1879
- Abolished: 1971
- Editions: 86
- Location: Melbourne, Australia
- Venue: Melbourne Cricket Ground LTC (1879–1933); Kooyong Lawn Tennis Club (1934–71)
- Surface: Hard / outdoor Asphalt / outdoor Grass / outdoor

The Victorian Championships was combined grass court tennis tournament founded in 1879. In 1970 it was rebranded as the Victorian Open. The event was held through to 1978. It was originally played at the Melbourne Cricket Ground Lawn Tennis Club, when the venue changed to Kooyong Lawn Tennis Club Australia for the remainder of its run.

== History ==
The Victorian Championships tournament began in 1879 it was originally held on hard asphalt courts from 1879 to 1891 before changing to a grass court tournament. The dates the tournament was held was normally in November. until its move to Kooyong when it was staged during the last week of November and first week of December in 1968 the event schedule changed again to January it survived for a period of 86 years until 1971. The tournament was briefly re-established in 1982 as the Melbourne Outdoor until 1985.

The first championship was held at the Melbourne Cricket Ground in January 1880. There were 16 entries. A. F. Robinson beat H. M. Strachan in the final by 2 sets to 1, winning the final set 6–5. In November 1880 another championship was held, the "Intercolonial Lawn Tennis Championship". It was held during the horticultural flower show, taking place on the Melbourne Cricket Ground. The event took an unusual form, in that after two rounds, three players remained. Frank Highett was to play R. P. Arnold, the winner playing Edward Wallington in the final. On the final day Wallington was ill and so the match between Highett and Arnold determined the winner. Highett won by 3 sets to 1, Arnold winning the second set. The 1881 championship was played on grass at the Melbourne Cricket Ground. Highett reached the final again but lost to Louis Whyte. The 1882 championship was played on the asphalt courts. Whyte reached the final again and met Arthur Keyser, a member of HMS Nelson. Whyte won the first set, but Keyser took the next three to win the championship. Whyte reached his third successive final in 1883 where he beat Walter Carre Riddell in three straight sets. The scoring system was changed in 1884. There were no sets, the winner being the first to reach 25 games. There were two new finalists, with Harry Brind beating Dudley Webb by 25 games to 15. 1885 saw a repeat of the 1883 final between Riddell and Whyte. Riddell took a 12 games to 1 lead and eventually won by 25 games to 13. 1885 saw a return to set scoring. Riddell retained the title, beating Webb in the final by three sets to one. The championship was preceded by an intercolonial match between Victoria and New South Wales. This was the first such match to be played in Victoria, the previous two having been played in Sydney. The match resulted in an easy win for Victoria, the opponents being unused to the asphalt surface.

== Finals ==
Notes: Challenge round: The final round of a tournament, in which the winner of a single-elimination phase faces the previous year's champion, who plays only that one match. The challenge round was used in the early history of tennis (from 1877 through 1921) in some tournaments not all. * Indicates challenger

=== Men's singles ===
Year	Champions	Runners-up	Score
1879	(Australia) A. F. Robinson	(Australia) H. M. Strachan	(2-1) sets
1880	(Australia) Frank Highett	(England) Edward Wallington	w.o.
1881	(Australia) Louis Whyte	(Australia) Frank Highett	6–4, 4–6, 6–1, 6–1
1882	(England) Arthur Keyser	(Australia) Louis Whyte	4–6, 6–0, 6–2, 6–5
1883	(Australia) Louis Whyte	(Australia) Walter John Carre Riddell	6–5, 6–4, 6–3
1884	(Australia) Harry Hanslow Brind	(Australia) Dudley Webb	(25 games to 17)
1885	(Australia) Walter John Carre Riddell	(Australia) Louis Whyte	(25 games to 13)
1886	(Australia) Walter John Carre Riddell (2)	(Australia) Dudley Webb	3–6, 6–2, 6–4, 6–4
1887	(Australia) Arthur Gideon Hugh Colquhoun	(Australia) Walter Timon Coldham	6–1, 7–5, 6–8, 0–6, 6–4
1888	(Australia) Arthur Gideon Hugh Colquhoun (2)	(England) John Thorneycroft Hartley	6–3, 6–4, 6–3
1889	(Australia) Richard Ernest Shuter	(Australia) Charles William Cropper	6–1, 3–6, 6–1, 6–0
1890	(Australia) John D. Crammond	(Australia) Benjamin (Ben) Green	6–2, 6–3, 4–6, 2–6, 6–4
1891	(Australia) Gus Kearney	(Australia) Richard Ernest Shuter	6–2, 5–7, 1–6, 6–4, 6–2
1892	(Australia) Benjamin Green	(Australia) William George Balfour	9–11, 6–3, 6–2, 6–2
1893	(Australia) Benjamin Green (2)	(Australia) Archibald Hulbert Windeyer	8–6, 6–4, 6–2
1894	(Australia) Benjamin Green (3)	(Australia) Gus Kearney	6–1, 1–6, 6–2, 6–1
1895	(New Zealand) Alfred Dunlop	(Australia) Horace Rice	3–6, 6–2, 6–3, 6–1
1896	(Australia) Gus Kearney (2)	(New Zealand) Alfred Dunlop	3–6, 5–7, 6–4, 6–3, 15-13
1897	(Australia) Gus Kearney (3)	(New Zealand) Alfred Dunlop	6–2, 2–6, 6–1, 6–3
1898	(New Zealand) Alfred Dunlop (2)	(Australia) Irving Thomas Carlyle	6–2, 1–6, 6–2, 3–6, 6–3
1899	(Australia) Gus Kearney (4)	(Australia) Horace Rice	1–6, 6–3, 6–3, 6–2
1900	(Australia) Irving Thomas Carlyle	(Australia) Norman Brookes	6–3, 6–1, 6–2
1901	(Australia) Horace Rice	(Australia) David Sutherland Edwards	7–5, 6–4, 3–6, 6–2
1902	(Australia) Norman Brookes	(New Zealand) Alfred Dunlop	1–6, 6–4, 6–2, 7–5
1903	(Australia) Norman Brookes (2)	(New Zealand) Alfred Dunlop	6–0, 4–6, 6–3, 6–2
1904	(Australia) Norman Brookes (3)	(Australia) Barney Murphy	6–0, 6–2, 6–0
1905	Not held (due to Australasian Championships)		
1906	(Australia) Norman Brookes (4)	(New Zealand) Anthony Wilding	6–0, 6–4, 9–7
1907	(New Zealand) Harry Parker	(New Zealand) Alfred Dunlop	8–6, 7–5, 7–5
1908	(New Zealand) Anthony Wilding	(United States) Fred Alexander	4–6, 6–0, 6–2, 6–2
1909	(New Zealand) Anthony Wilding (2)	(Australia) Norman Brookes	2–6, 3–6, 6–3, 6–3, 9–7
1910	(Australia) Stanley Doust	(New Zealand) Alfred Dunlop	6–1, 6–8, 2–6, 6–2, 6–2
1911	Australasian championships held		
1912	(Ireland) James Cecil Parke	(United Kingdom) Gordon Lowe	6–3, 6–0, 6–2
1913	(Australia) Rodney Heath	(Australia) Norman Brookes	w.o.
1914/1918	Not held (due to World War I)		
1919	(Australia) Gerald Patterson	(Australia) Norman Brookes	6–4, 3–6, 6–0, 6–3
1920	(Australia) Gerald Patterson (2)	(Australia) Pat O'Hara Wood	12–10, 6–3. 6–2
1921	(Australia) Gerald Patterson (3)	(Australia) Pat O'Hara Wood	5–7, 6–0, 6–4, 8–6
1922	(Australia) Gerald Patterson (4)	(Australia) John Hawkes	6–3, 6–3, 2–6, 7–5
1923	(Australia) Gerald Patterson (5)	(Australia) Pat O'Hara Wood	w.o.
1924	(Australia) Gerald Patterson (6)	(Australia) Jack Cummings	6–3, 10–8, 9–7
1925	(Australia) Richard Schlesinger	(Australia) Timothy Fitchett	6–3, 9–7, 6–1
1926	(Australia) Gerald Patterson (7)	(Australia) Jack Crawford	4–6, 6–3, 6–4, 6–4
1927	(Australia) Gerald Patterson (8)	(Australia) Jack Crawford	7–5, 6–1, 5–7, 1–6, 7–5
1928	(Australia) Jack Crawford	(Australia) Harry Hopman	5–7, 6–2, 6–3, 6–4
1929	(Australia) Jack Crawford (2)	(Australia) Harry Hopman	6–3, 2–6, 3–6, 6–4, 6–3
1930	(Australia) Jack Crawford (3)	(Australia) Harry Hopman	6–1, 8–10, 6–0, 6–2
1931	(Australia) Jack Crawford (4)	(Australia) Harry Hopman	7–5, 0–6, 6–3, 6–4
1932	(Australia) Jack Crawford(5)	(United States) Ellsworth Vines	1–6, 6–4, 6–4, 2–6, 6–4
1933	(United Kingdom) Fred Perry	(Australia) Jack Crawford	6–4, 2–6, 6–4, 6–3
1934	(Australia) Jack Crawford (6)	(Australia) Adrian Quist	6–2, 8–6, 6–3
1935	(Australia) Adrian Quist	(Australia) Jack Crawford	6–2, 8–6, 4–6, 6–2
1936	(Australia) Adrian Quist (2)	(Australia) Donald Turnbull	6–2, 6–1, 6–2
1937	(United States) Don Budge	(Australia) John Bromwich	8–6, 6–3, 9–7
1938	(Australia) Adrian Quist (3)	(Australia) John Bromwich	6–2, 6–3, 6–3
1939	(Australia) John Bromwich	(Australia) Adrian Quist	6–1, 4–6, 6–2, 6–3
1940	(Australia) John Bromwich (2)	(Australia) Adrian Quist	6–0, 6–2, 6–4
1941	(Australia) Jack Crawford (7)	(Australia) John Bromwich	6–3, 0–6, 3–6, 6–4, 6–2
1942/1944	Not held (due to World War II)		
1945	(Australia) John Bromwich (3)	(Australia) Dinny Pails	6–3, 6–4, 6–2
1946	(Australia) John Bromwich (4)	(United States) Ted Schroeder	8–6, 6–4, 6–4
1947	(Australia) Bill Sidwell	(Australia) Adrian Quist	6–4, 3–6, 2–6, 6–3, 6–2
1948	(Australia) Bill Sidwell	(Australia) Geoff Brown	6–4, 7–5, 8–6
1949	(Czechoslovakia) Jaroslav Drobný	(Australia) Bill Sidwell	6–4, 6–3, 11–9
1950	(Australia) Frank Sedgman	(United States) Art Larsen	5–7, 6–3, 7–5, 6–3
1951	(Australia) Frank Sedgman (2)	(United States) Dick Savitt	8–6, 6–0, 6–4
1952	(United States) Vic Seixas	(Australia) Frank Sedgman	8–6, 3–6, 6–3, 6–4
1953	(Australia) Lew Hoad	(Australia) Ken Rosewall	9–7, 8–6, 3–6, 6–3
1954	(Australia) Ken Rosewall	(United States) Vic Seixas	6–1, 4–6, 6–1, 7–5
1955	(Australia) Lew Hoad (2)	(Australia) Ashley Cooper	1–6, 6–4, 6–4, 5–7, 6–4
1956	(Australia) Ken Rosewall (2)	(Australia) Lew Hoad	4–6, 4–6, 6–1, 6–4, 6–3
1957	(Australia) Mal Anderson	(Australia) Ashley Cooper	6–4, 10–8, 1–6, 7–5
1958	(Australia) Mal Anderson (2)	(Australia) Ashley Cooper	7–5, 6–4, 6–3
1959	(Australia) Neale Fraser	(Australia) Roy Emerson	6–0, 25–23, 5–7, 6–4
1960	(United States) Barry MacKay	(United States) Butch Buchholz	8–6, 5–7, 8–6, 6–3
1961	(Australia) Rod Laver	(Australia) Roy Emerson	4–6, 8–6, 9–7, 6–3
1962	(Australia) Rod Laver (2)	(Australia) Neale Fraser	3–6, 9–7, 6–1, 6–8, 6–0
1963	(United States) Dennis Ralston	(Australia) Fred Stolle	8–6, 6–4, 6–3
1964	(Australia) Roy Emerson	(Australia) Fred Stolle	6–4, 6–4, 6–4
1965	(United States) Clark Graebner	(Australia) Roy Emerson	8–6, 7–5, 2–6, 1–6, 6–1
1966	(Australia) Roy Emerson (2)	(Australia) Fred Stolle	6–2, 9–7, 6–3
1967	(Australia) Tony Roche	(Australia) Bill Bowrey	7–5, 6–3, 6–4
↓ Open Era ↓
1969	(United States) Stan Smith	(United States) Arthur Ashe	14–12, 6–8, 6–3, 8–6
1970	(Australia) John Newcombe	(Australia) Tony Roche	6–4, 6–4, 4–6, ret.
1971	(Soviet Union) Alex Metreveli	(Australia) Phil Dent	6–4, 6–2

=== Women's singles ===
Year	Champions	Runners-up	Score
1884	(Australia) E. MacKenzie	(Australia) A. Bayles	10–4
1886	(Australia) C. Greene	(Australia) Ellen Mayne	6–1, 6–1
1887	(Australia) Mabel Shaw	(Australia) Eliza Fitzgerald	6–2, 6–3
1888	(Australia) Mabel Shaw (2)	(Australia) Anne Chenery	1–6, 6–2, 6–4
1889	(Australia) Nellie A. Beckett	(Australia) Constance Raleigh	6–3, 6–4
1890	(Australia) Mabel Shaw (3)	(Australia) E. Mackenzie	4–6, 6–3, 6–4
1891	(Australia) Ellen Mayne	(Australia) Mabel Shaw	6–5, 6–4
1892	(Australia) Edith Raleigh	(Australia) Ellen Mayne	1–6, 6–3, 6–2
1893	(Australia) C. Peach	(Australia) Edith Raleigh	6–4, 2–6, 6–4
1894	(Australia) Constance Raleigh	(Australia) Maisie Parr	6–5, 6–1
1895	(Australia) Phoebe Howitt	(Australia) Mabel Shaw	6–2, 6–5
1896	(Australia) Phoebe Howitt (2)	(Australia) Constance Raleigh	6–2, 6–2
1897	(Australia) Phoebe Howitt (3)	(Australia) Florence Waters	6–3, 2–6, 6–3
1898	(Australia) Phoebe Howitt (4)	(Australia) Florence Waters	6–0, 6–4
1899	(Australia) Phoebe Howitt (5)	(Australia) Florence Waters	6–2, 7–5
1900	(Australia) Phoebe Howitt-Cater (6)	(Australia) Mrs Barrington	6–3, 6–4
1901	(Australia) Lorna Gyton	(Australia) Lillian Payne	7–5, 6–3
1902	(Australia) Lorna Gyton (2)	(Australia) Gertrude Wilmoth	6–0, 8–6
1903	(Australia) Lorna Gyton (3)	(Australia) Lily Addison	6–1, 6–1
1904	(Australia) E. Collis	(Australia) C. Robertson	6–3, 6–2
1905	(Australia) Lorna Gyton (4)	(Australia) Gertrude Wilmoth	6–4, 6–1
1906	(Australia) Lily Addison	(Australia) Lorna Gyton	8–6, 6–2
1907	(Australia) Lorna Gyton (5)	(Australia) Lily Addison	2–6, 6–4, 8–6
1908	(Australia) Lily Addison (2)	(Australia) Lorna Gyton	11–9, 6–4
1909	(Australia) Lily Addison (3)	(Australia) Lorna Gyton	6–4, 6–2
1910	(Australia) Lily Addison (4)	(Australia) Pearl Stewart	4–6, 7–5, 6–0
1911	(Australia) Lily Addison (5)	(Australia) A. Wilmoth	6–3, 6–2
1912	(Australia) Phillis Stewart	(Australia) Lorna Gyton	6–1, 6–1
1913	(Australia) Meryl Waxman	(Australia) Lorna Gyton	4–6, 6–4, 6–4
1914	(Australia) Phillis Stewart (2)	(Australia) Dorothy Schlesinger	6–0, 6–4
1915/1918	Not held (due to World War I)		
1919	(Australia) Annie Ford	(Australia) Irene Forbes-Smith	7–5, 7–5
1920	(Australia) Margaret Molesworth	(Australia) Esna Boyd	7–5, 8–6
1921	(Australia) Lily Addison	(Australia) Esna Boyd	8–6, 3–6, 6–3
1922	(Australia) Esna Boyd	(Australia) Meryl Lister	6–2, 6–3
1923	(Australia) Esna Boyd (2)	(Australia) Kath Le Mesurier	6–2, 6–3
1924	(Australia) Daphne Akhurst	(Australia) Miss Harper	6–1, 0–6, 7–5
1925	(Australia) Esna Boyd (3)	(Australia) Sylvia Harper	3–6, 6–3 retired
1926	(Australia) Esna Boyd (4)	(Australia) Marjorie Cox	6–3, 6–2
1927	(Australia) Esna Boyd (5)	(Australia) Daphne Akhurst	6–1, 6–1
1928	(Australia) Marjorie Cox	(Australia) Sylvia Harper	6–8, 6–1, 7–5
1929	(Australia) Marjorie Cox (2)	(Australia) Kath Le Mesurier	6–2, 6–4
1930	(Australia) Marjorie Crawford (3)	(Australia) Frances Hoddle-Wrigley	6–1, 6–1
1931	(Australia) Esna Robertson (6)	(Australia) Kath Le Mesurier	6–2, 6–4
1932	(Australia) Joan Hartigan	(Australia) Coral Buttsworth	6–4, 6–8, 6–4
1933	(Australia) Joan Hartigan (2)	(Australia) Nancy Chitty	4–6, 7–5, 6–4
1934	(United Kingdom) Dorothy Round	(Australia) Joan Hartigan	9–7, 6–0
1935	(Australia) Thelma Coyne	(Australia) Joan Hartigan	6–1, 3–6, 6–4
1936	(Australia) Joan Hartigan (3)	(Australia) Emily Westacott	8–6, 6–2
1937	(United States) Dodo Bundy	(Australia) Nancye Wynne	6–4, 1–6, 6–4
1938	(Australia) Nell Hopman	(Australia) Joan Hartigan	6–8, 6–1, 6–2
1939	(Australia) Nancye Wynne	(Australia) Thelma Coyne	6–2, 6–2
1940	(Australia) Nancye Wynne (2)	(Australia) Thelma Coyne	7–5, 2–6, 6–3
1941	(Australia) Nell Hopman (2)	(Australia) Alison Burton	6–4, 5–7, 6–4
1942/1945	Not held (due to World War II)		
1946	(Australia) Nancye Bolton (3)	(Australia) Thelma Long	6–1, 9–7
1947	(Australia) Nancye Bolton (4)	(Australia) Thelma Long	6–1, 6–4
1948	(United States) Doris Hart	(Australia) Nancye Bolton	6–1, 9–7
1949	(Australia) Nancye Bolton (3)	(Australia) Thelma Long	6–8 6–2 8–6
1950	(Australia) Joyce Fitch	(Australia) Nancye Bolton	6–4, 3–6, 6–4
1951	(Australia) Thelma Long (2)	(Australia) Mary Hawton	6–2, 6–1
1952	(United States) Maureen Connolly	(United States) Julia Sampson	?
1953	(Australia) Thelma Long (3)	(Australia) Jennifer Staley	6–4, 6–1
1954	(Australia) Thelma Long (4)	(Australia) Jennifer Staley	4–6, 7–5, 6–2
1955	(Australia) Mary Hawton	(Australia) Mary Carter	6–2, 6–2
1956	(United States) Shirley Fry	(United States) Althea Gibson	4–6, 9–7, 8–6
1957	(Australia) Lorraine Coghlan	(United Kingdom) Angela Mortimer	7–5 7–5
1958	(South Africa) Sandra Reynolds	(Australia) Lorraine Coghlan	6–4, 8–6
1959	(Brazil) Maria Bueno	(United Kingdom) Christine Truman	6–0, 5–7, 6–4
1960	(Australia) Lesley Turner	(Australia) Mary Reitano	4–6, 9–7, 6–3
1961	(Australia) Margaret Smith	(United States) Darlene Hard	6–3, 6–2
1962	(Australia) Margaret Smith (2)	(Australia) Lesley Turner	6–4, 8–6
1963	(Australia) Margaret Smith (3)	(Australia) Lesley Turner	6–4, 6–4
1964	(Australia) Margaret Smith (4)	(Australia) Jill Blackman	6–1, 6–3
1965	(Australia) Margaret Smith (5)	(United States) Nancy Richey	5–7, 6–3, 6–2
1966	(United States) Rosie Casals	(Australia) Kerry Melville	1–6, 6–1, 7–5
1967	(United States) Billie Jean King	(Australia) Lesley Turner	6–3, 3–6, 7–5
↓ Open Era ↓
1969	(Australia) Margaret Court (6)	(Australia) Kerry Harris	6–1, 6–4
1970	(Australia) Margaret Court (7)	(Australia) Kerry Melville	6–1, 6–1
1971	(Australia) Evonne Goolagong	(Australia) Margaret Court	7–6^{(5-3)}, 7–6^{(5-2)}

== Records ==
=== Men's singles ===
Source: The Tennisbase included

- Most titles: (Australia) Gerald Patterson, (8)
- Most consecutive titles: (Australia) Gerald Patterson, (6)
- Most finals: (Australia) Jack Crawford, (11)
- Most consecutive finals: (Australia) Jack Crawford, (10)
- Most matches played: (Australia) Jack Crawford, (76)
- Most matches won: (Australia) Jack Crawford, (64)
- Most consecutive match wins: (Australia) Gerald Patterson, (33)
- Most editions played: (Australia) Harry Hopman, (21)
- Best match winning %: (Australia) Gerald Patterson, (93.62%)
- Longest final: (Australia) Neale Fraser v (Australia) Roy Emerson, result: 6-0, 25-23, 5-7, 6-4 (76 games), (1959)
- Shortest final: (Soviet Union) Alex Metreveli v (Australia) Phil Dent, result: 6-4, 6-2 (18 games), (1971)
- Title with the fewest games lost: (Australia) Norman Brookes, (19), (1904)
- Oldest champion: (Australia) Harry Parker, 34y 6m and 19d, (1907)
- Youngest champion: (Australia) Lew Hoad, 19y 0m and 7d, (1953)

== See also ==
- Tennis in Australia

== Other sources ==
- Ayre's Lawn Tennis Almanack And Tournament Guide, A. Wallis Myers
- Dunlop Lawn Tennis Almanack And Tournament Guide, G.P. Hughes, 1939 to 1958, Published by Dunlop Sports Co. Ltd, UK
- Lowe's Lawn Tennis Annuals and Compendia, Lowe, Sir F. Gordon, Eyre & Spottiswoode
