= Nawratil =

Nawratil is a surname of Czech origin. A spelling variant of Navrátil, it is found mainly in Austria, Germany, and Poland. Notable people with the surname include:

- Grażyna Pstrokońska-Nawratil (born 1947), Polish composer
- Heinz Nawratil (1937–2015), German lawyer
