= Navrátil =

Navrátil (Czech pronunciation: [ˈnavraːcɪl]) (feminine Navrátilová) is a Czech surname.

Notable people with the surname Navrátil, Navratil, Navrátilová or Navratilova include:

- Gabriela Navrátilová (born 1976), Czech tennis player
- Jakub Navrátil (born 1984), Czech footballer
- Jan Navrátil (born 1990), Czech football midfielder
- Jaroslav Navrátil (footballer) (born 1991), Czech footballer
- Jaroslav Navrátil (sport shooter) (born 1943), Czech shooter
- Jaroslav Navrátil (tennis) (born 1957), Czech tennis player
- Jiří Navrátil (1923–2017), Czech scout
- Josef Navrátil (1798–1865), Bohemian painter
- Karel Navrátil (1867–1936), Czech violinist
- Leo Navratil (1921–2006), Austrian psychiatrist and author
- Martina Navratilova (born 1956), Czech-American tennis player
- Michal Navrátil (diver) (born 1985), Czech diver
- Michal Navrátil (tennis) (born 1982), Czech tennis player
- Michel Marcel Navratil (1908–2001), RMS Titanic survivor
- Miloslav Navrátil, Czech darts player
- Miroslav Navratil (1893–1947), Croatian soldier, pilot and general
- Philipp Navratil, Swiss business executive
- Zane Navratil (born 1995), American pickleball player
- Mirai Navrátil (born 1992), Czech-Japanese musician

== See also ==
- Nawratil, a variant of Navratil
