= Lily Addison =

Australian tennis player

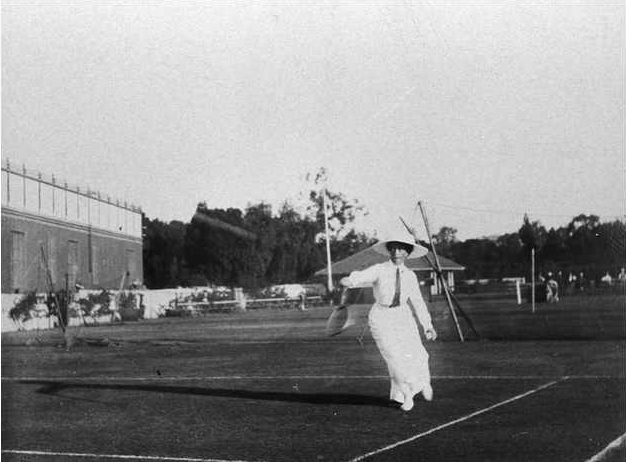
- Addison in 1914
- Full name: Marion Lilian Addison
- Country (sports): Australia
- Born: 21 December 1885; Adelaide, British Colony of South Australia
- Died: 27 November 1982 (aged 96)

Singles

Grand Slam singles results
- Australian Open: 1R (1924)
- Wimbledon: 2R (1919)

Doubles

Grand Slam doubles results
- Australian Open: 1R (1924)

Mixed doubles

Grand Slam mixed doubles results
- Wimbledon: SF (1919)

Marion Lilian Addison (21 December 1885 – 27 November 1982) was an Australian tennis player.

== Biography ==
Addison was born in Adelaide in 1885. Between 1906 and 1911, she won numerous titles at the tennis championships of Victoria, South Australia and New South Wales. She was champion of South Australia in 1906 and from 1908 to 1911. In 1909 and 1911, she won the title at the Victorian championship. In 1910, she won all three events – singles, doubles and mixed doubles – at the championships of New South Wales. In 1911, she could defend her singles title at Sydney again. By 1910, Addison lived at Melbourne.

In late 1913, Addison started nursing training at the Melbourne Hospital which she finished in early 1917. Her brother J.J., also a successful tennis player, was killed in action in Northern France in May 1915. In August 1917, she enlisted in the Australian Army Nursing Service and served in British military hospitals in Salonika, Greece. Because of lung problems, she was transferred to the 3rd Australian Auxiliary Hospital at Dartford in February 1919.

In England, Addison took the chance to play at the 1919 Wimbledon Championships. In singles, she lost her second round match against Winifred McNair. In mixed doubles, partnering Max Décugis, she could reach the semifinals where the pair was stopped by Dorothea Lambert Chambers and Albert Davis Prebble.

After the tournament, Addison returned to Australia. She was selected into the Victorian tennis team to play against New South Wales in November 1919. In 1921, she worked at Melbourne Hospital again, but was able to win the Victorian championships for a last time. In 1924, she played at the Australasian Championships. In doubles, she lost the first round 4–6, 3–6 partnering J. Hope. In singles, she retired before the match against Edith Johnson.

Addison nursed at the Royal Adelaide Hospital in 1937. By 1940, she had returned to Melbourne and lived at Mont Albert. In 1972, she is recorded as living in Kew. Addison, who apparently never married, died at an age of 96 in 1982.
