= 1983 New South Wales Open =

1983 NSW Open
- Date: 12–18 December (men); 21–27 November (women)
- Edition: 92nd
- Draw: 56S / 32D
- Prize money: $150,000
- Surface: Grass
- Location: Sydney, Australia
- Venue: White City Stadium

Champions

Men's singles
- (Sweden) Joakim Nyström

Women's singles
- (United Kingdom) Jo Durie

Men's doubles
- (Australia) Pat Cash / (United States) Mike Bauer

Women's doubles
- (United Kingdom) Anne Hobbs / (Australia) Wendy Turnbull
- Sydney International

The 1983 New South Wales Open was a combined men's and women's tennis tournament played on outdoor grass courts at the White City Stadium in Sydney, Australia. The men's tournament, named ANZ Bank NSW Open, was part of the 1983 Volvo Grand Prix and held from 12 December until 18 December 1983. The women's tournament, known as the NSW Building Society Open, was part of the 1983 Virginia Slims World Championship Series and was played from 21 November through 27 November 1983. It was the 92nd edition of the tournament. Third-seeded Jo Durie won the women's singles title, the first British female player to do so since Dorothy Round in 1934.

== Finals ==
=== Men's singles ===
(Sweden) Joakim Nyström defeated (United States) Mike Bauer 2–6, 6–3, 6–1

- It was Nyström's 1st singles title of his career.

=== Women's singles ===
(United Kingdom) Jo Durie defeated (United States) Kathy Jordan 6–3, 7–5

- It was Durie's 2nd and final singles title of the year and of her career.

=== Women's doubles ===
(United Kingdom) Anne Hobbs / (Australia) Wendy Turnbull defeated (Czechoslovakia) Hana Mandlíková / (Czechoslovakia) Helena Suková 6–4, 6–3

- It was Hobbs' 5th title of the year and the 6th of her career. It was Turnbull's 4th title of the year and the 56th of her career.

=== Men's doubles ===
(Australia) Pat Cash / (United States) Mike Bauer defeated (Australia) Broderick Dyke / (Australia) Rod Frawley 7–6, 6–4
