= Alfred Dunlop =

Australian tennis player

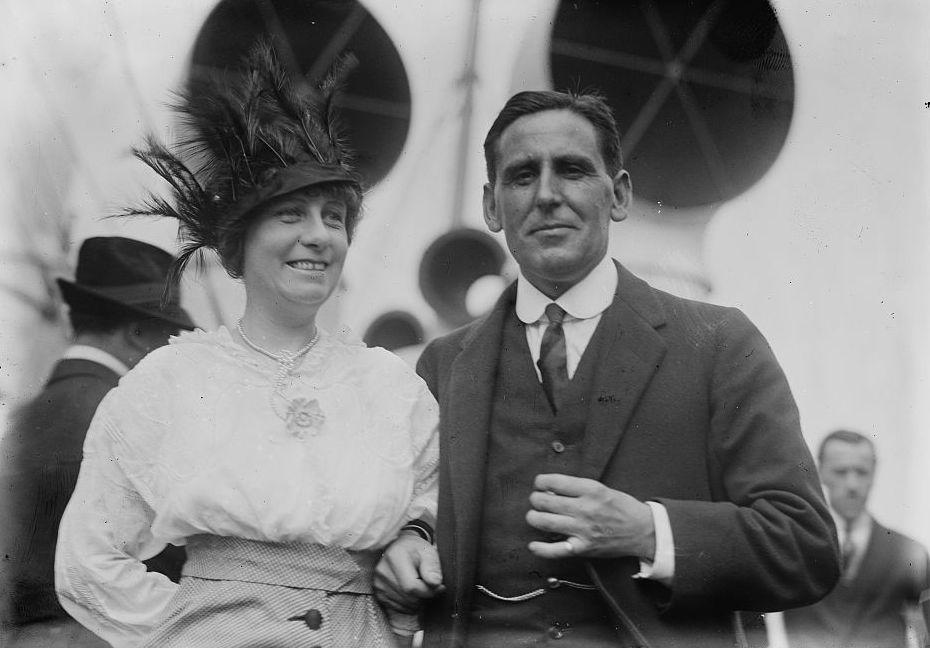
- Alfred Dunlop with his wife, Lucille Adeline Wickham Treadway (1874–1951)
- Full name: Alfred Wallace Dunlop
- Country (sports): Australia
- Born: 12 January 1875 Christchurch, New Zealand
- Died: 6 May 1933 (aged 58) Melbourne, Australia
- Turned pro: 1897 (amateur tour)
- Retired: 1914
- Plays: Right-handed (one-handed backhand)

Singles

Grand Slam singles results
- Australian Open: F (1908)
- Wimbledon: 4R (1914)

Other tournaments
- WHCC: 2R (1914)

Doubles

Grand Slam doubles results
- Australian Open: W (1908)

Alfred Wallace Dunlop (12 January 1875 – 6 May 1933) was an Australian tennis player, born in Christchurch, New Zealand. He won the doubles title at the Australasian Championships, the future Australian Open, alongside Fred Alexander in 1908. He also reached the singles finals at the tournament that year, losing to Alexander. He represented Australasia in the Davis Cup several times between 1905 and 1914.

== Grand Slam finals ==
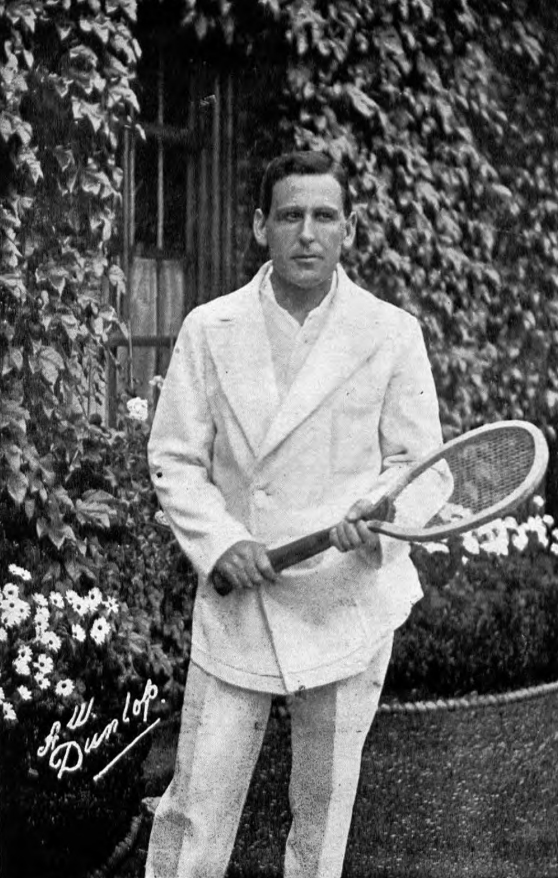
A W Dunlop

=== Singles (1 runner-up) ===
Result	Year	Championship	Surface	Opponent	Score
Loss	1908	Australasian Championships	Grass	(United States) Fred Alexander	6–3, 6–3, 0–6, 2–6, 3–6

=== Doubles (1 title) ===
Result	Year	Championship	Surface	Partner	Opponents	Score
Win	1908	Australasian Championships	Grass	(United States) Fred Alexander	(Australia) Granville G. Sharp (New Zealand) Anthony Wilding	6–3, 6–2, 6–1
