= Sydney International =

Professional tennis tournament in Sydney

Coordinates: 33.855°S 151.072°E

Defunct tennis tournament
- Founded: 1885; 141 years ago
- Abolished: 2022
- Location: Sydney; Australia
- Venue: SCG (1885–1907); Double Bay (1908–1921); White City Stadium (1922–1999); Sydney Olympic Park Tennis Centre (since 2000)
- Surface: Grass – outdoors (1885–1988); Hard – outdoors (since 1989)
- Website: Official website

Current champions (2022)
- Men's singles: (Russia) Aslan Karatsev
- Women's singles: (Spain) Paula Badosa
- Men's doubles: (Australia) John Peers (Slovakia) Filip Polášek
- Women's doubles: (Kazakhstan) Anna Danilina (Brazil) Beatriz Haddad Maia
ATP Tour
- Category: GP Championship Series (1970–71); Grand Prix Tour (1970–89); ATP World Series (1990–97); ATP International Series (1998–2008); ATP World Tour 250 series (since 2009)
- Draw: 28S / 16Q / 16Q
- Prize money: US$521,000 (2022)
WTA Tour
- Category: WTA Tier III (1990–92); WTA Tier II (1993–2008); WTA Premier tournaments (since 2009–19); WTA 500 (since 2022)
- Draw: 30S / 24D/ 16Q
- Prize money: US$703,580 (2022)

The Sydney International (formerly known as the Championship of New South Wales and New South Wales Open, with various title sponsors), formerly sponsored as the Apia International Sydney from 2012 to 2017, was a professional tennis tournament in Sydney, Australia. The tournament was played annually at the Sydney Olympic Park Tennis Centre in Sydney Olympic Park. It is one of the oldest tennis tournaments in the world, dating to 1885. In 2020 and 2021, the tournament was briefly replaced by the ATP Cup, before briefly returning in 2022 and has since been replaced in both men's and women's calendars by the United Cup.

The Sydney International was most recently held in 2022 as an ATP 250 event on the men's tour and a WTA 500 event on the women's tour. The tournament is held annually in January immediately prior to the Australian Open as a lead up tournament as part of the Australian Open Series.

== History ==
The model for the Sydney International was formed in 1885 when colonial officials decided there was a need to discover the best tennis player in each of the colonies and to use the tournament to assist with selection to the Australasia Davis Cup team, however the first time the tournament was played as a permanent annual event was in 1935. Between 1970 and 1989 it was part of the Grand Prix tennis circuit and a Grand Prix Super Series tournament from 1970 to 1971.

The tournament was not included on the men's or women's schedule for the 2020 and 2021 seasons, as the new ATP Cup took place in the same period. The tournament briefly returned in 2022 as the Sydney Tennis Classic, before being replaced by the mixed-gender event, United Cup since 2023.

=== Tournament locations ===
The inaugural edition of the tournament was played in May 1885 at the "Association Ground" in Moore Park, part of the Sydney Cricket Ground. In 1908 control of the tournament was handed over to the NSW Tennis Association and the event moved to Double Bay. From 1922 until 1999 the event was hosted at the White City complex, close to the Sydney central business district.

Since the 2000 edition, the event was played at the Sydney Olympic Park Tennis Centre, in Sydney Olympic Park, a suburb of Western Sydney and formerly part of the suburb of Homebush Bay, which was constructed for the tennis events at the 2000 Summer Olympics. The venue consists of 15 outdoor courts and a centre court along with an administrative building, for the whole of Tennis NSW.

== Past finals ==
=== Men's singles ===
Year	Champions	Runners-up	Score
1885	(British Empire) William J.B. Salmon	(Australia) Walter John C. Riddell	1–6, 6–8, 6–3, 6–2, 6–3
1886	(Australia) Charles W. Cropper	(British Empire) William J.B. Salmon	6–0, 6–0, 5–7, 8–6
1887	(Australia) Charles W. Cropper (2)	(Australia) Robert D. Fitzgerald	6–4, 6–2, 6–0
1888	(Australia) Dudley Webb	(Australia) Charles W. Cropper	6–0, 6–4, 7–5
1889	(Australia) Arthur G.H. Colquhoun	(Australia) Dudley Webb	6–2, 0–6, 6–3, 6–2
1890	(Australia) Dudley Webb (2)	(Australia) Herbert E. Webb	6–2, 6–3, 6–2
1891	(British Empire) Wilberforce Eaves	(Australia) Dudley Webb	3–6, 6–3, 6–4, 8–6
1892	(Australia) Dudley Webb (3)	(Australia) Ben Green	6–4, 2–6, 5–7, 10–8, 9–7
1893	(Australia) Dudley Webb (4)	(Australia) Ben Green	2–6, 5–7, 6–2, 6–3, 7–5
1894	(Australia) Dudley Webb (5)	(Australia) Ben Green	5–7, 6–0, 6–2, 6–4
1895	(Australia) Henry R. Crossman	(Australia) Dudley Webb	6–4, 6–2, 6–3
1896	(Australia) Henry R. Crossman (2)	(Australia) Horace Rice	6–3, 4–6, 6–1, 4–6, 6–0
1897	(Australia) Albert Curtis	(Australia) Henry R. Crossman	6–1, 6–0, 6–4
1898	(Australia) Henry R. Crossman (3)	(Australia) Alfred Dunlop	14–12, 6–1, 6–2
1899	(Australia) August Kearney	(Australia) David L. Gaden	6–1, 6–0, 12–10
1900	(Australia) Horace Rice	(Australia) Leslie Poidevin	6–0, 6–1, 3–6, 6–4
1901	(Australia) August Kearney (2)	(Australia) Horace M. Rice	8–6, 1–6, 5–7, 6–1, 6–0
1902	(British Empire) Wilberforce Eaves	(Australia) August Kearney	6–0, 7–5, 1–6, 6–2
1903	(Australia) Granville G. Sharp	(Australia) Barney Murphy	6–3, 6–3, 6–1
1904	(Australia) Granville G. Sharp (2)	(Australia) Horace Rice	6–3, 6–4, 6–2
1905	Not Held		
1906	(Australia) Granville G. Sharp (3)	(Australia) Stanley Doust	6–1, 6–2, 6–2
1907	(Australia) Horace Rice	(New Zealand) Harry Parker	6–4, 6–3, 3–6, 5–7, 6–1
1908	(Australia) Rodney Heath	(Australia) Horace Rice	6–3, 6–4, 7–9, 6–4
1909	(Australia) Rodney Heath (2)	(Australia) Granville G. Sharp	6–1, 3–6, 6–1, 0–6, 6–3
1910	(New Zealand) Harry Parker	(Australia) Horace Rice	6–3, 4–6, 2–6, 8–6, 9–7
1911	(Australia) Ashley Campbell	(Australia) Horace Rice	8–6, 6–3, 6–1
1912	(Australia) Alfred Jones	(Australia) Ashley Campbell	6–2, 3–6, 8–6, 2–1 retired
1913	(Australia) Arthur O'Hara Wood	(Australia) James Anderson	6–3, 3–6, 6–1, 3–6, 6–0
1914	(Australia) James Anderson	(Australia) Alfred Jones	7–5, 3–6, 6–1, 6–3
1915	(Australia) Henry Marsh	(Australia) Alfred Jones	3–6, 6–4, 6–4, 0–6, 6–4
1916– 1918	Not Held		
1919	(Australia) James Anderson (2)	(Australia) R. Neil	9–7, 2–6, 7–5, 6–1
1920	(Australia) R. Neil	(Australia) Eric Pockley	6–4, 4–6, 6–1, 6–3
1921	(Australia) Gerald Patterson	(Australia) John Hawks	walkover
1922	(Australia) Ronald Thomas	(Australia) Norman Peach	2–6, 6–3, 6–3, 6–8, 6–3
1923	(Australia) James Anderson (3)	(Australia) Norman Peach	6–4, 6–3, 6–0
1924	(Australia) Gerald Patterson (2)	(Australia) James Willard	6–4, 7–9, 6–2, 6–0
1925	(Australia) Norman Peach	(Australia) A. Seiler	6–4, 1–6, 4–6, 7–5, 8–6
1926	(Australia) Fred Kalms	(New Zealand) Buster Andrews	6–2, 6–4, 3–6, 6–4
1927	(Australia) Jack Crawford	(Australia) Richard Schlesinger	7–5, 1–6, 9–7, 5–7, 6–4
1928	(Australia) Fred Kalms (2)	(Australia) James Willard	6–1, 6–4, 2–6, 3–6, 6–0
1929	(Australia) Jack Crawford (2)	(Australia) Clifford Sproule	6–1, 6–3, 6–3
1930	(Australia) Jack Cummings	(Australia) Edgar Moon	6–1, 6–0, 7–5
1931	(Australia) Jack Crawford (3)	(Australia) Harry Hopman	3–6, 6–3, 6–4, 6–4
1932^{Mar}	(Australia) Jack Crawford (4)	(Australia) W. B. Walker	6–2, 6–3, 8–6
1932^{Nov}	(United States) Ellsworth Vines	(United States) Wilmer Allison	4–6, 6–1, 2–6, 6–4, 7–5
1933	(Australia) Jack Crawford (5)	(Australia) Harry Hopman	6–4, 8–6, 7–5
1934	(Australia) Jack Crawford (6)	(United Kingdom) Fred Perry	7–5, 2–6, 6–3, 1–6, 7–5
1935	(Australia) Adrian Quist	(Australia) Harry Hopman	6–3, 6–1, 3–6, 8–10, 6–2
1936	(Australia) Jack Crawford (7)	(Australia) John Bromwich	6–4, 3–6, 1–6, 11–9, 6–2
1937	(Australia) John Bromwich	(Australia) Adrian Quist	4–6, 6–4, 6–1, 2–6, 7–5
1938	(Australia) John Bromwich (2)	(Australia) Adrian Quist	6–2, 6–4, 6–1
1939	(Australia) John Bromwich (3)	(Australia) Adrian Quist	2–6, 6–0, 6–4, 6–0
1940	(Australia) John Bromwich (4)	(Australia) Adrian Quist	6–3, 4–6, 10–8, 6–8, 6–1
1941– 1944	Not Held		
1945	(Australia) Dinny Pails	(Australia) John Bromwich	6–1, 6–2, 6–4
1946	(Australia) John Bromwich (5)	(Australia) Dinny Pails	3–6, 6–3, 6–4, 6–4
1947	(Australia) Adrian Quist	(United States) James Brink	6–4, 6–2, 2–6, 4–6, 6–3
1948	(Australia) John Bromwich (6)	(Australia) Frank Sedgman	6–4, 6–1, 7–5
1949	(Australia) John Bromwich (7)	(Australia) Bill Sidwell	6–3, 10–8, 3–6, 6–3
1950	(United States) Art Larsen	(Australia) Frank Sedgman	3–6, 6–4, 6–3, 6–2
1951	(United States) Vic Seixas	(Australia) Mervyn Rose	4–6, 9–7, 4–6, 7–5, 6–3
1952	(Australia) Frank Sedgman	(Australia) Ken McGregor	6–2, 4–6, 6–4, 6–2
1953	(Australia) Lew Hoad	(Australia) Ken Rosewall	8–6, 4–6, 9–7, 10–8
1954	(Australia) Rex Hartwig	(Australia) Mervyn Rose	6–3, 6–4, 8–6
1955	(Australia) Lew Hoad (2)	(Australia) Ken Rosewall	6–2, 6–3, 2–6, 6–1
1956	(Australia) Ken Rosewall	(Australia) Neale Fraser	6–4, 7–5, 6–4
1957	(Australia) Ashley Cooper	(Australia) Neale Fraser	6–4, 6–3, 6–3
1958	(Australia) Ashley Cooper (2)	(United States) Butch Buchholz	6–0, 6–1, 7–9, 6–2
1959	(Australia) Neale Fraser	(Australia) Roy Emerson	11–9, 8–6, 6–3
1960	(Australia) Neale Fraser (2)	(United States) Barry MacKay	10–8, 6–4, 7–5
1961	(Australia) Rod Laver	(Australia) Roy Emerson	8–6, 6–3, 3–6, 4–6, 6–4
1962	(Australia) Neale Fraser (3)	(Australia) Ken Fletcher	6–4, 7–5, 3–6, 4–6, 6–3
1963	(United States) Dennis Ralston	(United Kingdom) Mike Sangster	6–8, 6–3, 6–4, 6–4
1964	(Australia) Fred Stolle	(Australia) Roy Emerson	4–6, 6–3, 11–9, 6–8, 6–3
1965	(Australia) John Newcombe	(United States) Arthur Ashe	6–8, 6–2, 7–5, 6–1
1966	(Australia) Fred Stolle (2)	(Australia) John Newcombe	12–10, 6–0, 6–0
1967	(Australia) Tony Roche	(Australia) Roy Emerson	8–6, 6–1, 8–6
1968	Not Held		
Open Era
1969	(Australia) Tony Roche (2)	(Australia) Rod Laver	6–4, 4–6, 9–7, 12–10
1970	(Australia) Rod Laver (2)	(Australia) Ken Rosewall	3–6, 6–2, 3–6, 6–2, 6–3
1971	(Australia) Phil Dent	(Australia) John Alexander	6–3, 6–4, 6–4
1972	(Soviet Union) Alexander Metreveli	(France) Patrice Dominguez	6–4, 6–4, 3–6, 6–1
1973	(Australia) Malcolm Anderson	(Australia) Ken Rosewall	6–3, 6–4, 6–4
1974^{Jan}	(Australia) Geoff Masters	(Australia) Colin Dibley	6–1, 6–4, 6–2
1974^{Dec}	(Australia) Tony Roche (3)	(Australia) Phil Dent	7–6, 4–6, 3–6, 6–2, 8–6
1975	(Australia) Ross Case	(Australia) John Marks	6–2, 6–1,
1976	(Australia) Tony Roche (4)	(United States) Dick Stockton	6–3, 3–6, 6–3, 6–4
1977	(United States) Roscoe Tanner	(United States) Brian Teacher	6–3, 3–6, 6–3, 6–7, 6–4
1978	(United States) Tim Wilkison	(Australia) Kim Warwick	6–3, 6–3, 6–7, 3–6, 6–2
1979	(Australia) Phil Dent (2)	(United States) Hank Pfister	6–4, 6–4, 7–5
1980	(United States) Fritz Buehning	(United States) Brian Teacher	6–3, 6–7, 7–6
1981	(United States) Tim Wilkison (2)	(New Zealand) Chris Lewis	6–4, 7–6, 6–3
1982	(Australia) John Alexander	(Australia) John Fitzgerald	4–6, 7–6, 6–4
1983	(Sweden) Joakim Nyström	(United States) Mike Bauer	2–6, 6–3, 6–1
1984	(Australia) John Fitzgerald	(United States) Sammy Giammalva Jr.	6–3, 6–3
1985	(France) Henri Leconte	(New Zealand) Kelly Evernden	6–7, 6–2, 6–3
1986	Not held		
1987	(Czechoslovakia) Miloslav Mečíř	(Australia) Peter Doohan	6–2, 6–4
1988	(Australia) John Fitzgerald (2)	(Soviet Union) Andrei Chesnokov	6–3, 6–4
1989	(United States) Aaron Krickstein	(Soviet Union) Andrei Cherkasov	6–4, 6–2
1990	(France) Yannick Noah	(Germany) Carl-Uwe Steeb	5–7, 6–3, 6–4
1991	(France) Guy Forget	(Germany) Michael Stich	6–3, 6–4
1992	(Spain) Emilio Sánchez	(France) Guy Forget	6–3, 6–4
1993	(United States) Pete Sampras	(Austria) Thomas Muster	7–6, 6–1
1994	(United States) Pete Sampras (2)	(United States) Ivan Lendl	7–6, 6–4
1995	(United States) Patrick McEnroe	(Australia) Richard Fromberg	6–2, 7–6
1996	(United States) Todd Martin	(Croatia) Goran Ivanišević	5–7, 6–3, 6–4
1997	(United Kingdom) Tim Henman	(Spain) Carlos Moyá	6–3, 6–1
1998	(Slovakia) Karol Kučera	(United Kingdom) Tim Henman	7–5, 6–4
1999	(United States) Todd Martin (2)	(Spain) Àlex Corretja	6–3, 7–6
2000	(Australia) Lleyton Hewitt	(Australia) Jason Stoltenberg	6–4, 6–0
2001	(Australia) Lleyton Hewitt (2)	(Sweden) Magnus Norman	6–4, 6–1
2002	(Switzerland) Roger Federer	(Argentina) Juan Ignacio Chela	6–3, 6–3
2003	(South Korea) Lee Hyung-taik	(Spain) Juan Carlos Ferrero	4–6, 7–6, 7–6
2004	(Australia) Lleyton Hewitt (3)	(Spain) Carlos Moyá	4–3, Ret.
2005	(Australia) Lleyton Hewitt (4)	(Czech Republic) Ivo Minář	7–5, 6–0
2006	(United States) James Blake	(Russia) Igor Andreev	6–2, 3–6, 7–6
2007	(United States) James Blake (2)	(Spain) Carlos Moyá	6–3, 5–7, 6–1
2008	(Russia) Dmitry Tursunov	(Australia) Chris Guccione	7–6, 7–6
2009	(Argentina) David Nalbandian	(Finland) Jarkko Nieminen	6–3, 6–7, 6–2
2010	(Cyprus) Marcos Baghdatis	(France) Richard Gasquet	6–4, 7–6^{(7–2)}
2011	(France) Gilles Simon	(Serbia) Viktor Troicki	7–5, 7–6^{(7–4)}
2012	(Finland) Jarkko Nieminen	(France) Julien Benneteau	6–2, 7–5
2013	(Australia) Bernard Tomic	(South Africa) Kevin Anderson	6–3, 6–7^{(2–7)}, 6–3
2014	(Argentina) Juan Martín del Potro	(Australia) Bernard Tomic	6–3, 6–1
2015	(Serbia) Viktor Troicki	(Kazakhstan) Mikhail Kukushkin	6–2, 6–3
2016	(Serbia) Viktor Troicki (2)	(Bulgaria) Grigor Dimitrov	2–6, 6–1, 7–6^{(9–7)}
2017	(Luxembourg) Gilles Müller	(United Kingdom) Daniel Evans	7–6^{(7–5)}, 6–2
2018	(Russia) Daniil Medvedev	(Australia) Alex de Minaur	1–6, 6–4, 7–5
2019	(Australia) Alex de Minaur	(Italy) Andreas Seppi	7–5, 7–6^{(7–5)}
2020–2021	Not held		
2022	(Russia) Aslan Karatsev	(United Kingdom) Andy Murray	6–3, 6–3
2023-2024	Not held		

=== Women's singles ===
Year	Champions	Runners-up	Score
1885	(Australia) Annie Lamb	(Australia) Miss Gordon	6–5, 6–4
1886	(Australia) C. Greene	(Australia) Annie Lamb	6–3, 6–2
1887	(Australia) Ellen Montgomerie Mayne	(Australia) C. Greene	8–6, 6–4
1888	(Australia) Lillian Scott	(Australia) Ellen Montgomerie Mayne	8–6, 6–4
1889	(Australia) Ellen Montgomerie Mayne (2)	(Australia) Ellen Blaxland	6–3, 5–7, 6–4
1890	(Australia) Ellen Montgomerie Mayne (3)	(Australia) Mabel Shaw	6–0, 6–0
1891	(Australia) Mary Dransfield	(Australia) Ellen Montgomerie Mayne	W/O
1892	(Australia) Mabel Shaw	(Australia) Mary Dransfield	7–5, 3–6, 6–4
1893	(Australia) Ellen Montgomerie Mayne (4)	(Australia) Mabel Shaw	6–0, 6–0
1894	(Australia) Mary Dransfield (2)	(Australia) Mabel Shaw	W/O
1895	(Australia) Mabel Shaw (2)	(Australia) S. Dransfield	6–3, 2–6, 6–3
1896	(New Zealand) Kate Nunneley	(Australia) Mabel Shaw	6–2, 6–0
1897	(Australia) Phoebe Howlitt	(New Zealand) Kate Nunneley	6–3, 3–6, 6–4
1898	(Australia) Phoebe Howlitt (2)	(Australia) Mary Dransfield	6–4, 4–1, Ret.
1899	(Australia) Phoebe Howlitt (3)	(Australia) Rose Payton	3–6, 10–8, 7–5
1900	(Australia) Rose Payton	(Australia) Phoebe Howlitt	6–1, 6–1
1901	(Australia) Rose Payton (2)	(Australia) Mary Dransfield	6–2, Ret.
1902	(Australia) Rose Payton (3)	(Australia) Mary Dransfield	6–1, 6–2
1903	(Australia) Rose Payton (4)	(Australia) Mrs. Beatty	6–1, 6–0
1904	(Australia) Rose Payton (5)	(Australia) Lee	6–1, 6–2
1905	Not Held		
1906	(Australia) Annie Baker	(Australia) Gardiner	6–2, 6–1
1907	(Australia) Rose Payton (6)	(Australia) D. Gordon	6–2, 6–0
1908	(Australia) Annie Baker (2)	(Australia) Collings	6–2, 6–2
1909	(New Zealand) Lucy Powdrell	(Australia) Annie Baker	6–3, 6–3
1910	(Australia) Lily Addison	(Australia) Pearl Stewart	6–0, 3–6, 6–2
1911	(Australia) Pearl Stewart	(Australia) Collings	6–0, 6–3
1912	(Australia) Annie Baker Ford (3)	(Australia) Collings	6–0, 6–3
1913	(Australia) Pearl Stewart (2)	(Australia) Annie Baker Ford	6–2, 6–1
1914	(Australia) Pearl Stewart (3)	(Australia) Annie Baker Ford	6–1, 6–0
1915	(Australia) Pearl Stewart (4)	(Australia) Annie Baker Ford	6–4, 6–2
1918– 1916	Not Held		
1919	(Australia) Margaret Molesworth	(Australia) Annie Baker Ford	2–6, 6–4, 6–1
1920	(Australia) Annie Halley	(Australia) Annie Baker Ford	6–4, 6–3
1921	(Australia) Margaret Molesworth (2)	(Australia) Sylvia Lance Harper	6–2, 6–4
1922	(New Zealand) Nancy Curtis	(Australia) Margaret Molesworth	10–8, 5–7, 7–5
1923	(Australia) Esna Boyd Robertson	(Australia) Margaret Molesworth	4–6, 6–2, 6–4
1924	(Australia) Sylvia Lance Harper	(Australia) Margaret Molesworth	6–2, 8–6
1925	(Australia) Marjorie Cox Crawford	(Australia) Annie Gray Martin	7–5, 6–1
1926	(Australia) Esna Boyd Robertson (2)	(Australia) Daphne Akhurst	3–6, 6–3, 6–0
1927	(Australia) Esna Boyd Robertson (3)	(Australia) Daphne Akhurst	3–6, 6–3, 6–2
1928	(Australia) Sylvia Lance Harper (2)	(Australia) Marjorie Cox Crawford	6–4, 6–4
1929	(Australia) Daphne Akhurst	(Australia) Kathleen Le Messurier	6–2, 6–2
1930	(Australia) Louie Bickerton	(Australia) Emily Hood	6–3, 6–4
1931	(Australia) Marjorie Cox Crawford (2)	(Australia) Ula Valkenburg	7–5, 6–2
1932^{Mar}	(Australia) Joan Hartigan	(Australia) Margaret Molesworth	6–2, 6–2
1932^{Dec}	(Australia) Marjorie Cox Crawford (3)	(Australia) Joan Hartigan	4–6, 6–4, 6–4
1933	(Australia) Joan Hartigan (2)	(Australia) Louise Bickerton	6–4, 6–2
1934	(United Kingdom) Dorothy Round	(Australia) Emily Hood Westacott	6–2, 6–0
1935	(Australia) Thelma Coyne Long	(Australia) Joan Hartigan	6–2, 6–0
1936	(Australia) Nancye Wynne Bolton	(Australia) Nell Hall Hopman	4–6, 6–4, 6–1
1937	(Australia) Nancye Wynne Bolton (2)	(Australia) Thelma Coyne Long	6–3, 7–5
1938	(Australia) Thelma Coyne Long (2)	(Australia) Joan Hartigan	6–2, 6–2
1939	(Australia) Nancye Wynne Bolton (3)	(Australia) Thelma Coyne Long	8–6, 6–3
1940	(Australia) Thelma Coyne Long (3)	(Australia) Vivienne Berg	6–3, 6–1
1944– 1941	Not Held		
1945	(Australia) Nancye Wynne Bolton (4)	(Australia) Nell Hall Hopman	6–3, 6–3
1946	(Australia) Nancye Wynne Bolton (5)	(Australia) Thelma Coyne Long	6–3, 4–6, 6–1
1947	(Australia) Nancye Wynne Bolton (6)	(Australia) Marie Toomey	6–2, 6–1
1948	(United States) Doris Hart	(Australia) Joyce Fitch Rymer	1–6, 6–4, 6–2
1949	(Australia) Joyce Fitch Rymer	(Australia) Nancye Wynne Bolton	4–6, 7–5, 7–5
1950	(Australia) Nancye Wynne Bolton (7)	(Australia) Esme Ashford	6–3, 6–2
1951	(Australia) Thelma Coyne Long (4)	(Australia) Mary Bevis Hawton	6–2, 6–2
1952	(United States) Maureen Connolly	(United States) Julie Sampson Haywood	6–3, 6–2
1953	(Australia) Thelma Coyne Long (5)	(Australia) Mary Bevis Hawton	6–1, 8–6
1954	(Australia) Beryl Penrose Collier	(Australia) Jenny Staley	6–0, 1–6, 6–3
1955	(Australia) Mary Bevis Hawton	(Australia) Mary Carter Reitano	9–7, 9–7
1956	(United States) Althea Gibson	(United States) Shirley Fry	10–8, 6–2
1957	(Australia) Lorraine Coghlan Robinson	(United Kingdom) Angela Mortimer	6–4, 10–8
1958	(South Africa) Renée Schuurman	(Australia) Jan Lehane	6–2, 4–6, 6–4
1959	(Australia) Jan Lehane	(Australia) Mary Carter Reitano	6–3, 3–6, 6–2
1960	(Australia) Jan Lehane (2)	(Australia) Margaret Court	6–1, 6–3
1961	(Australia) Margaret Court	(United States) Darlene Hard	6–2, 6–1
1962	(Australia) Margaret Court (2)	(Australia) Lesley Turner Bowrey	8–6, 6–2
1963	(Australia) Margaret Court (3)	(Australia) Judy Tegart-Dalton	6–1, 6–3
1964	(Australia) Margaret Court (4)	(United States) Billie-Jean King	6–4, 6–3
1965	(Australia) Margaret Court (5)	(United States) Nancy Richey	6–2, 6–2
1966	(Australia) Lesley Turner Bowrey	(Australia) Kerry Reid	6–8, 9–7, 6–3
1967	(Australia) Judy Tegart-Dalton	(Australia) Margaret Court	walkover
1968	Not Held		
Open Era
1969	(Australia) Margaret Court (6)	(United States) Rosemary Casals	6–1, 6–2
1970	(United States) Billie-Jean King	(Australia) Margaret Court	6–2, 4–6, 6–3
1971	(Australia) Margaret Court (7)	(Soviet Union) Olga Morozova	6–2, 6–2
1972	(Australia) Evonne Goolagong	(United Kingdom) Virginia Wade	6–1, 7–6
1973	(Australia) Karen Krantzcke	(Australia) Evonne Goolagong	4–6, 6–3, 10–8
1974^{Jan}	(Australia) Karen Krantzcke (2)	(Australia) Evonne Goolagong	6–2, 6–3
1974^{Dec}	(Australia) Evonne Goolagong (2)	(Australia) Margaret Court	6–3, 7–5
1975	(Australia) Evonne Goolagong (3)	(United Kingdom) Sue Barker	6–2, 6–4
1976	(Australia) Kerry Reid	(Australia) Dianne Fromholtz	3–6, 6–3, 6–2
1977	(Australia) Evonne Goolagong (4)	(United Kingdom) Sue Barker	6–2, 6–3
1978	(Australia) Dianne Fromholtz	(Australia) Wendy Turnbull	6–2, 7–5
1979	(Czechoslovakia) Hana Mandlíková	(Germany) Bettina Bunge	6–3, 3–6, 6–3
1980	(Australia) Wendy Turnbull	(United States) Pam Shriver	3–6, 6–4, 7–6
1981	(United States) Chris Evert	(United States) Martina Navratilova	6–4, 2–6, 6–1
1982	(United States) Martina Navratilova	(Australia) Evonne Goolagong	6–0, 3–6, 6–1
1983	(United Kingdom) Jo Durie	(United States) Kathy Jordan	6–3, 7–5
1984	(United States) Martina Navratilova (2)	(United States) Ann Henricksson	6–1, 6–1
1985	(United States) Martina Navratilova (3)	(Czechoslovakia) Hana Mandlíková	3–6, 6–1, 6–2
1986	Not Held		
1987	(United States) Zina Garrison	(United States) Pam Shriver	6–2, 6–4
1988	(United States) Pam Shriver	(Czechoslovakia) Helena Suková	6–2, 6–3
1989	(United States) Martina Navratilova (4)	(Sweden) Catarina Lindqvist	6–2, 6–4
1990	(Soviet Union) Natasha Zvereva	(Austria) Barbara Paulus	4–6, 6–1, 6–3
1991	(Czech Republic) Jana Novotná	(Spain) Arantxa Sánchez Vicario	6–4, 6–2
1992	(Argentina) Gabriela Sabatini	(Spain) Arantxa Sánchez Vicario	6–1, 6–1
1993	(United States) Jennifer Capriati	(Germany) Anke Huber	6–4, 6–1
1994	(Japan) Kimiko Date	(United States) Mary Joe Fernández	6–4, 6–2
1995	(Argentina) Gabriela Sabatini (2)	(United States) Lindsay Davenport	6–3, 6–4
1996	(United States) Monica Seles	(United States) Lindsay Davenport	4–6, 7–6^{(9–7)}, 6–3
1997	(Switzerland) Martina Hingis	(United States) Jennifer Capriati	6–1, 5–7, 6–1
1998	(Spain) Arantxa Sánchez Vicario	(United States) Venus Williams	6–1, 6–3
1999	(United States) Lindsay Davenport	(Switzerland) Martina Hingis	6–4, 6–3
2000	(France) Amélie Mauresmo	(United States) Lindsay Davenport	7–6^{(7–2)}, 6–4
2001	(Switzerland) Martina Hingis (2)	(United States) Lindsay Davenport	6–3, 4–6, 7–5
2002	(Switzerland) Martina Hingis (3)	(United States) Meghann Shaughnessy	6–2, 6–3
2003	(Belgium) Kim Clijsters	(United States) Lindsay Davenport	6–4, 6–3
2004	(Belgium) Justine Henin	(France) Amélie Mauresmo	6–4, 6–4
2005	(Australia) Alicia Molik	(Australia) Samantha Stosur	6–7^{(5–7)}, 6–4, 7–5
2006	(Belgium) Justine Henin (2)	(Italy) Francesca Schiavone	4–6, 7–5, 7–5
2007	(Belgium) Kim Clijsters (2)	(Serbia) Jelena Janković	4–6, 7–6^{(7–1)}, 6–4
2008	(Belgium) Justine Henin (3)	(Russia) Svetlana Kuznetsova	4–6, 6–2, 6–4
2009	(Russia) Elena Dementieva	(Russia) Dinara Safina	6–3, 2–6, 6–1
2010	(Russia) Elena Dementieva (2)	(United States) Serena Williams	6–3, 6–2
2011	(China) Li Na	(Belgium) Kim Clijsters	7–6^{(7–3)}, 6–3
2012	(Belarus) Victoria Azarenka	(China) Li Na	6–2, 1–6, 6–3
2013	(Poland) Agnieszka Radwańska	(Slovakia) Dominika Cibulková	6–0, 6–0
2014	(Bulgaria) Tsvetana Pironkova	(Germany) Angelique Kerber	6–4, 6–4
2015	(Czech Republic) Petra Kvitová	(Czech Republic) Karolína Plíšková	7–6^{(7–5)}, 7–6^{(8–6)}
2016	(Russia) Svetlana Kuznetsova	(Puerto Rico) Monica Puig	6–0, 6–2
2017	(United Kingdom) Johanna Konta	(Poland) Agnieszka Radwańska	6–4, 6–2
2018	(Germany) Angelique Kerber	(Australia) Ashleigh Barty	6–4, 6–4
2019	(Czech Republic) Petra Kvitová (2)	(Australia) Ashleigh Barty	1–6, 7–5, 7–6^{(7–3)}
2020–2021	Not held		
2022	(Spain) Paula Badosa	(Czech Republic) Barbora Krejčíková	6–3, 4–6, 7–6^{(7–4)}
2023-2024	Not held		

=== Men's doubles ===
Year	Champions	Runners-up	Score
2009	(United States) Bob Bryan (United States) Mike Bryan	(Canada) Daniel Nestor (Serbia) Nenad Zimonjić	6–1, 7–6^{(7–3)}
2010	(Canada) Daniel Nestor (Serbia) Nenad Zimonjić	(United Kingdom) Ross Hutchins (Australia) Jordan Kerr	6–3, 7–6^{(7–5)}
2011	(Czech Republic) Lukáš Dlouhý (Australia) Paul Hanley	(United States) Bob Bryan (United States) Mike Bryan	6–7^{(6–8)}, 6–3, [10–5]
2012	(United States) Bob Bryan (United States) Mike Bryan	(Australia) Matthew Ebden (Finland) Jarkko Nieminen	6–1, 6–4
2013	(United States) Bob Bryan (United States) Mike Bryan	(Belarus) Max Mirnyi (Romania) Horia Tecău	6–4, 6–4
2014	(Canada) Daniel Nestor (Serbia) Nenad Zimonjić	(India) Rohan Bopanna (Pakistan) Aisam-ul-Haq Qureshi	7–6^{(7–3)}, 7–6^{(7–3)}
2015	(India) Rohan Bopanna (Canada) Daniel Nestor	(Netherlands) Jean-Julien Rojer (Romania) Horia Tecău	6–4, 7–6^{(7–5)}
2016	(United Kingdom) Jamie Murray (Brazil) Bruno Soares	(India) Rohan Bopanna (Romania) Florin Mergea	6–3, 7–6^{(8–6)}
2017	(Netherlands) Wesley Koolhof (Netherlands) Matwé Middelkoop	(United Kingdom) Jamie Murray (Brazil) Bruno Soares	6–3, 7–5
2018	(Poland) Łukasz Kubot (Brazil) Marcelo Melo	(Germany) Jan-Lennard Struff (Serbia) Viktor Troicki	6–3, 6–4
2019	(United Kingdom) Jamie Murray (2) (Brazil) Bruno Soares (2)	(Colombia) Juan Sebastián Cabal (Colombia) Robert Farah	6–4, 6–3
2020–2021	Not held		
2022	(Australia) John Peers (Slovakia) Filip Polášek	(Italy) Simone Bolelli (Italy) Fabio Fognini	7–5, 7–5
2023-2024	Not held		

=== Women's doubles ===
Year	Champions	Runners-up	Score
1982	(United States) Martina Navratilova (United States) Pam Shriver	(West Germany) Claudia Kohde-Kilsch (West Germany) Eva Pfaff	6–2, 2–6, 7–6
1983	(United Kingdom) Anne Hobbs (Australia) Wendy Turnbull	(Czechoslovakia) Hana Mandlíková (Czechoslovakia) Helena Suková	6–4, 6–3
1984	(West Germany) Claudia Kohde-Kilsch (Czechoslovakia) Helena Suková	(Australia) Wendy Turnbull (United States) Sharon Walsh	6–2, 7–6
1985	(Czechoslovakia) Hana Mandlíková (Australia) Wendy Turnbull (2)	(South Africa) Rosalyn Fairbank (United States) Candy Reynolds	3–6, 7–6, 6–4
1986	Not Held		
1987	(United States) Betsy Nagelsen (Australia) Elizabeth Smylie	(Australia) Jenny Byrne (Australia) Janine Thompson	6–7, 7–5, 6–1
1988	(United States) Ann Henricksson (Switzerland) Christiane Jolissaint	(West Germany) Claudia Kohde-Kilsch (2) (Czechoslovakia) Helena Suková (2)	7–6, 4–6, 6–3
1989	(United States) Martina Navratilova (2) (United States) Pam Shriver (2)	(Australia) Elizabeth Smylie (Australia) Wendy Turnbull (2)	6–3, 6–3
1990	(Czech Republic) Jana Novotná (Czechoslovakia) Helena Suková (2)	(Soviet Union) Larisa Neiland (Soviet Union) Natasha Zvereva	6–3, 7–5
1991	(Spain) Arantxa Sánchez Vicario (Czechoslovakia) Helena Suková (3)	(United States) Gigi Fernández (Czech Republic) Jana Novotná	6–1, 6–4
1992	(Spain) Arantxa Sánchez Vicario (2) (Czechoslovakia) Helena Suková (4)	(United States) Mary Joe Fernández (United States) Zina Garrison	7–6^{(7–4)}, 6–7^{(4–7)}, 6–2
1993	(United States) Pam Shriver (3) (Australia) Elizabeth Smylie (2)	(United States) Lori McNeil (Australia) Rennae Stubbs	7–6^{(7–4)}, 6–2
1994	(United States) Patty Fendick (United States) Meredith McGrath	(Czech Republic) Jana Novotná (2) (Spain) Arantxa Sánchez Vicario	6–2, 6–3
1995	(United States) Lindsay Davenport (Czech Republic) Jana Novotná (2)	(United States) Patty Fendick (United States) Mary Joe Fernández (2)	7–5, 2–6, 6–4
1996	(United States) Lindsay Davenport (2) (United States) Mary Joe Fernández	(United States) Lori McNeil (2) (Czechoslovakia) Helena Suková (3)	6–3, 6–3
1997	(United States) Gigi Fernández (Spain) Arantxa Sánchez Vicario (3)	(United States) Lindsay Davenport (Belarus) Natasha Zvereva	6–3, 6–1
1998	(Switzerland) Martina Hingis (Czechoslovakia) Helena Suková (5)	(United States) Katrina Adams (United States) Meredith McGrath	6–1, 6–2
1999	(Russia) Elena Likhovtseva (Japan) Ai Sugiyama	(United States) Mary Joe Fernández (3) (Germany) Anke Huber	6–3, 2–6, 6–0
2000	(France) Julie Halard-Decugis (Japan) Ai Sugiyama (2)	(Switzerland) Martina Hingis (France) Mary Pierce	6–0, 6–3
2001	(Russia) Anna Kournikova (Austria) Barbara Schett	(United States) Lisa Raymond (Australia) Rennae Stubbs (2)	6–2, 7–5
2002	(United States) Lisa Raymond (Australia) Rennae Stubbs	(Switzerland) Martina Hingis (2) (Russia) Anna Kournikova	W/O
2003	(Belgium) Kim Clijsters (Japan) Ai Sugiyama (3)	(Spain) Conchita Martínez (Australia) Rennae Stubbs (3)	6–3, 6–3
2004	(Zimbabwe) Cara Black (Australia) Rennae Stubbs (2)	(Russia) Dinara Safina (United States) Meghann Shaughnessy	7–5, 3–6, 6–4
2005	(Australia) Bryanne Stewart (Australia) Samantha Stosur	(Russia) Elena Dementieva (Japan) Ai Sugiyama	w/o
2006	(United States) Corina Morariu (Australia) Rennae Stubbs (3)	(Spain) Virginia Ruano Pascual (Argentina) Paola Suárez	6–3, 5–7, 6–2
2007	(Germany) Anna-Lena Grönefeld (United States) Meghann Shaughnessy	(France) Marion Bartoli (United States) Meilen Tu	6–3, 3–6, 7–6^{(7–2)}
2008	(China) Yan Zi (China) Zheng Jie	(Ukraine) Tatiana Perebiynis (Belarus) Tatiana Poutchek	6–4, 7–6^{(7–5)}
2009	(Chinese Taipei) Hsieh Su-wei (China) Peng Shuai	(France) Nathalie Dechy (Australia) Casey Dellacqua	6–0, 6–1
2010	(Zimbabwe) Cara Black (2) (United States) Liezel Huber	(Italy) Tathiana Garbin (Russia) Nadia Petrova	6–1, 3–6, [10–3]
2011	(Czech Republic) Iveta Benešová (Czech Republic) Barbora Záhlavová-Strýcová	(Czech Republic) Květa Peschke (Slovenia) Katarina Srebotnik	4–6, 6–4, [10–7]
2012	(Czech Republic) Květa Peschke (Slovenia) Katarina Srebotnik	(United States) Liezel Huber (United States) Lisa Raymond (2)	6–1, 4–6, [13–11]
2013	(Russia) Nadia Petrova (Slovenia) Katarina Srebotnik (2)	(Italy) Sara Errani (Italy) Roberta Vinci	6–3, 6–4
2014	(Hungary) Tímea Babos (Czech Republic) Lucie Šafářová	(Italy) Sara Errani (2) (Italy) Roberta Vinci (2)	7–5, 3–6, [10–7]
2015	(United States) Bethanie Mattek-Sands (India) Sania Mirza	(United States) Raquel Kops-Jones (United States) Abigail Spears	6–3, 6–3
2016	(Switzerland) Martina Hingis (2) (India) Sania Mirza (2)	(France) Caroline Garcia (France) Kristina Mladenovic	1–6, 7–5, [10–5]
2017	(Hungary) Tímea Babos (2) (Russia) Anastasia Pavlyuchenkova	(India) Sania Mirza (Czech Republic) Barbora Strýcová	6–4, 6–4
2018	(Canada) Gabriela Dabrowski (China) Xu Yifan	(Chinese Taipei) Latisha Chan (Czech Republic) Andrea Sestini Hlaváčková	6–3, 6–1
2019	(Serbia) Aleksandra Krunić (Czech Republic) Kateřina Siniaková	(Japan) Eri Hozumi (Poland) Alicja Rosolska	6–1, 7–6^{(7–3)}
2020–2021	Not held		
2022	(Kazakhstan) Anna Danilina (Brazil) Beatriz Haddad Maia	(Germany) Vivian Heisen (Hungary) Panna Udvardy	4–6, 7–5, [10–8]
2023-2024	Not held		
