= White City Stadium (Sydney) =

Tennis venue in Sydney, Australia

Coordinates: 33°52′46″S 151°13′52″E

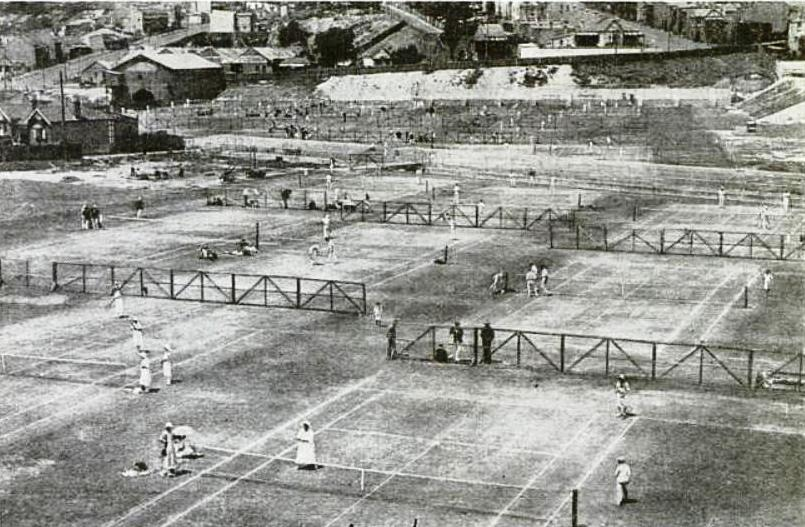
White City Tennis Club circa 1923

White City Stadium at the White City Tennis Club was a tennis venue in Rushcutters Bay, Sydney, Australia. The stadium was built in 1922 on the former site of Sydney's White City amusement park as a new venue for the New South Wales Championships (now an international tournament known as the Sydney International). The venue served as host of the tournament until the Sydney Olympic Park Tennis Centre opened for the 2000 Summer Olympics. The club was formed in 1947, and today has 8 synthetic grass courts. The White City tennis complex has fallen into disrepair with the old stadiums and the grass courts which hosted famous matches no longer usable. The Australian Tennis Museum was located at White City from its founding in 1983 until 2005 when it moved out to Sydney Olympic Park Tennis Centre.

== Famous tennis matches and tournaments ==
=== Davis Cup ===
White City was host to some of Australia's Davis Cup championships during their dominant run in the 1950s and 1960s. It hosted the Challenge Round in 1951 (Australia defeating the United States), 1954 (USA def. Australia), 1960 (Australia def. Italy), 1965 (Australia def. Spain), and the final in 1977 (Australia def. Italy). The stadium also saw the USA defeat Italy in the Inter-Zonal Final in 1952 (before losing to Australia in the Challenge Round in Adelaide) and saw the USA defeat Australia in the 1979 semifinal. The 1954 final set the record for the largest crowd at a sanctioned tennis match, 25,578. This record held until 2004, when the Davis Cup final at the Estadio Olímpico de Sevilla, a converted football stadium, beat it.

Pat Rafter defeated Cédric Pioline in a Davis Cup tie after recovering from being two sets down in 1997.

=== Australian Open ===
White City hosted the last Australian Open tournament to be held outside Melbourne, in 1971. Ken Rosewall and Margaret Court were the 1971 Champions.

=== Sydney International ===
Martina Hingis defeated Jennifer Capriati in the final of the Sydney International in 1997.

== Redevelopment 2022-2024 ==
White City was purchased by the Maccabi-Hakoah Club in 2010–11. Plans included building a large community centre, including tennis courts, however, redevelopment was slow due to drawn out disputes over the plans. Demolition was completed in December 2022 and 9 new courts (synthetic grass and hard courts) are due to open by the end of 2024.

== Notes ==
Preceded by West Side Tennis Club, New York City; Kooyong Stadium, Melbourne; West Side Tennis Club, New York City; Harold Clark Courts, Cleveland; Estadio Nacional de Chile, Santiago	Davis Cup; Final Venue; 1951; 1954; 1960; 1965; 1977	Succeeded by Memorial Drive Tennis Centre, Adelaide; West Side Tennis Club, New York City; Kooyong Stadium, Melbourne; Kooyong Stadium, Melbourne; Mission Hills Country Club, Rancho Mirage
