= 1998 Sydney International – Men's doubles =

Men's doubles
- 1998 Sydney International

Final
- Champions: (Australia) Todd Woodbridge (Australia) Mark Woodforde
- Runners-up: (Netherlands) Jacco Eltingh (Canada) Daniel Nestor
- Score: 6–3, 7–5

Events
| Singles | men | women |
| Doubles | men | women |
| ← 1997 · | Sydney International | · 1999 → |

The 1998 Sydney International was a tennis tournament played on outdoor hard courts at the NSW Tennis Centre in Sydney, Australia that was part of the International Series of the 1998 ATP Tour and of Tier II of the 1998 WTA Tour. The tournament was held from 11 through 17 January 1998.

== Seeds ==
Champion seeds are indicated in bold text while text in italics indicates the round in which those seeds were eliminated.

1. (Australia) **Todd Woodbridge** / (Australia) **Mark Woodforde (champions)**
2. (South Africa) Ellis Ferreira / (United States) Rick Leach (first round)
3. (Netherlands) Jacco Eltingh / (Canada) Daniel Nestor (semifinals)
4. (South Africa) Piet Norval / (India) Leander Paes (quarterfinals)

== Draw ==
=== Key ===
- Q = Qualifier
- WC = Wild card
- LL = Lucky loser
- Alt = Alternate
- SE = Special exempt
- PR = Protected ranking
- ITF = ITF entry
- JE = Junior exempt
- w/o = Walkover
- r = Retired
- d = Defaulted
- SR = Special ranking

=== Finals ===
First round
1 | (Australia) **T Woodbridge** **(Australia) M Woodforde** | **6** | **6**
(Australia) S Draper (Sweden) T Johansson | 3 | 0
(Australia) **L Hewitt** **(Australia) L Smith** | **7** | **7**
(Czechoslovakia) L Pimek (Germany) D Prinosil | 5 | 6
4 | (South Africa) **P Norval** **(India) L Paes** | **6** | 1 | **7**
(Australia) J Eagle (Australia) Florent | 4 | **6** | 6
(Netherlands) **T Kempers** **(Netherlands) M Oosting** | **6** | **6**
(Australia) S Stolle (Czech Republic) C Suk | 3 | 1
(Argentina) **P Albano** **(Spain) À Corretja** | 3 | **7** | **6**
(Sweden) P Nyborg (South Africa) B Talbot | **6** | 6 | 4
3 | (Netherlands) **J Eltingh** **(Canada) D Nestor** | **6** | **6**
(Australia) A Kratzmann (Australia) D Macpherson | 3 | 2
(Australia) **M Tebbutt** **(Australia) P Tramacchi** | **6** | 1 | **6**
(United States) D Randall (United States) J Waite | 4 | **6** | 2
(South Africa) **J-L de Jager** **(South Africa) R Koenig** | **7** | 2 | **6**
2 | (South Africa) E Ferreira (United States) R Leach | 6 | **6** | 3

Quarterfinals
1 | (Australia) **T Woodbridge** **(Australia) M Woodforde** | **6** | **6**
(Australia) L Hewitt (Australia) L Smith | 1 | 4
4 | (South Africa) P Norval (India) L Paes | **7** | 6 | 4
(Netherlands) **T Kempers** **(Netherlands) M Oosting** | 6 | **7** | **6**
(Argentina) P Albano (Spain) À Corretja | 3 | 6
3 | (Netherlands) **J Eltingh** **(Canada) D Nestor** | **6** | **7**
(Australia) M Tebbutt (Australia) P Tramacchi | 6 | **6** | 5
(South Africa) **J-L de Jager** **(South Africa) R Koenig** | **7** | 4 | **7**

Semifinals
1 | (Australia) **T Woodbridge** **(Australia) M Woodforde** | **6** | **6**
(Netherlands) T Kempers (Netherlands) M Oosting | 3 | 4
3 | (Netherlands) **J Eltingh** **(Canada) D Nestor** | **6** | 1 | **7**
(South Africa) J-L de Jager (South Africa) R Koenig | 4 | **6** | 5

Final
1 | (Australia) **T Woodbridge** **(Australia) M Woodforde** | **6** | **7**
3 | (Netherlands) J Eltingh (Canada) D Nestor | 3 | 5
