= 1999 Serena Williams tennis season =

- Full name: Serena Jameka Williams
- Country: United States
- Calendar prize money: $2,605,102

Singles
- Season record: 41-7 (85.42%)
- Calendar titles: 5
- Year-end ranking: 4
- Ranking change from previous year: ▲16

Grand Slam & significant results
- Australian Open: 3R
- French Open: 3R
- Wimbledon: A
- US Open: W

Doubles
- Season record: 29-4 (87.88%)
- Calendar titles: 3
- Year-end ranking: 10
- Ranking change from previous year: ▲26

Grand Slam doubles results
- Australian Open: SF
- French Open: W
- Wimbledon: A
- US Open: W

Mixed doubles
- Season record: 5-1 (83.33%)
- Calendar titles: 0

Grand Slam mixed doubles results
- Australian Open: F
- French Open: A
- Wimbledon: A
- US Open: A
- Last updated on: April 2, 2013.

The Serena Williams 1999 season was her breakthrough season, winning her first career title at the Open Gaz de France and winning her first slam at the US Open.

== Year summary ==
=== Early hard court season ===
At the Australian Open, Williams lost in the third round to Sandrine Testud despite holding two match points. After two losses in tight three-setters in Australia, at the hands of Testud in Melbourne and Steffi Graf in Sydney, Williams won her first professional singles title when she defeated Amélie Mauresmo in the final of the Open Gaz de France in Paris, thus becoming the 13th unseeded player to win a Tier II or higher event since 1980. With Venus also winning the IGA Superthrift Classic in Memphis, Tennessee, that day, the pair became the first sisters to win professional tournaments in the same week.

In March of that year, at the Evert Cup in California, Williams won her first WTA 1000 event, defeating a 29-year-old Steffi Graf in the final, thus ending Graf's completed finals winning streak at 20, which dated back to 1995. Soon afterward at the Miami Masters, Williams had her 16-match winning streak ended by her sister in the first all-sister singles final in WTA history and the first all-sister women's final in 115 years, with the only other such final taking place at Wimbledon in 1884, when Maud Watson beat her older sister, Lilian, to become Wimbledon's first female champion. This was the best winning streak that includes a player's first title since Steffi Graf's 23-match streak in 1986. Williams then made her top-10 debut, at No. 9.

=== Clay court season ===
Williams lost in the quarterfinals of the Italian Open and the German Open. At the French Open, Williams lost in the third round to Mary Joe Fernández, but in the doubles event, she and Venus did not drop a single set en route to the final, where they defeated the pair of Martina Hingis and Anna Kournikova, who were the self-proclaimed "Spice Girls" of tennis, having dropped just a single set on their route to the Australian Open doubles title. It was the first major title for the Williams sisters and would be their first step towards completing the career Golden Slam in doubles.

Williams then missed Wimbledon because of injury. When she returned to the tour two months later, Williams made her Fed Cup debut. After a two-and-a-half-hour rain delay and with Monica Seles unavailable, the USTA and U.S. captain Billie Jean King turned to her other rookie, 17-year-old Serena, to try to close out the tie. Williams did just that, toppling Rita Grande, 6-1, 6-1, in 50 minutes, thus sending the U.S. back to the final for the first time since 1996. In doing so at 17 years and nine months old, she became the sixth youngest player in US Fed Cup history to win a match. The Williams sisters, who were traveling internationally without their parents for the first time in their careers, then teamed up to win the dead doubles rubber against Tathiana Garbin and Adriana Serra Zanetti, to cap a perfect debut. She then won her third title at the JPMorgan Chase Open in Los Angeles, beating Julie Halard-Decugis in the final. This moved her ranking back into the Top 10 at No. 9, tying her career high.

=== Late hard court season ===
At the US Open, Williams defeated Grand Slam champions Kim Clijsters, Conchita Martínez, Monica Seles, and defending champion Lindsay Davenport in consecutive matches to reach the final, where she faced the world No. 1, the 18-year-old Martina Hingis, who had defeated her sister in the semifinals and also in the 1997 US Open final. She finished the job that her sister could not by beating Hingis 6–3, 7–6^{(7–4)} to capture her first US Open title at age 17 in only her second year as a pro; she won despite making 57 unforced errors, 33 more than Hingis. In doing so, she became the lowest seed to win the US Open in the Open era, the sixth American woman in the Open Era to win a Major, and only the second African-American woman, after Althea Gibson in 1958, to win a Grand Slam singles tournament.

In the doubles event, the Williams sisters defeated Chanda Rubin and Sandrine Testud in the final, 4–6, 6–1, 6–4 to win the women's doubles title. It was the second doubles major title for the Williams sisters, and their second step towards completing the career Golden Slam in doubles. Serena thus became the fifth woman in the Open Era to win both the singles and doubles event of a major, while she and Venus became the first sisters to win a US Open doubles championship in 101 years, since Juliette and Kathleen Atkinson accomplished it in 1897 and 1898. In total, the Williams girls earned $1.29 million for their two-week US Open travel, $915,000 of it reeled in by Serena.

To complete her 1999 season, Williams teamed up with Venus to win a doubles match in the Fed Cup final to help Team USA win the 1999 Fed Cup title against Russia at the Taube Family Tennis Stadium in Stanford, Calif. Williams ended the year ranked in a career-high world No. 4 in just her second full year on the main tour.

== All matches ==
=== Singles matches ===
| Tournament | Match | Round | Opponent | Rank | Result | Score |
| Sydney International; Sydney, Australia; Tier II; Hard, outdoor 11–17 January 1999 | 56 | 1R | (Argentina) Inés Gorrochategui | #208 | Win | 6–4, 6–2 |
| Sydney International; Sydney, Australia; Tier II; Hard, outdoor 11–17 January 1999 | 57 | 2R | (Germany) Steffi Graf | #10 | Loss | 2–6, 6–3, 5–7 |
| Australian Open; Melbourne, Australia; Grand Slam; Hard, outdoor 18–31 January 1999 | 58 | 1R | (Romania) Raluca Sandu | #99 | Win | 6–2, 6–3 |
| Australian Open; Melbourne, Australia; Grand Slam; Hard, outdoor 18–31 January 1999 | 59 | 2R | (Spain) Magüi Serna | #22 | Win | 6–1, 6–3 |
| Australian Open; Melbourne, Australia; Grand Slam; Hard, outdoor 18–31 January 1999 | 60 | 3R | (France) Sandrine Testud | #15 | Loss | 2–6, 6–2, 7–9 |
| Open Gaz de France; Paris, France; Tier II; Hard, outdoor 22–28 February 1999 | 61 | 1R | (Sweden) Åsa Svensson | #94 | Win | 6–1, 6–2 |
| Open Gaz de France; Paris, France; Tier II; Hard, outdoor 22–28 February 1999 | 62 | 2R | (France) Nathalie Tauziat | #9 | Win | 6–1, 6–4 |
| Open Gaz de France; Paris, France; Tier II; Hard, outdoor 22–28 February 1999 | 63 | QF | (France) Julie Halard-Decugis | #21 | Win | 6–2, 6–3 |
| Open Gaz de France; Paris, France; Tier II; Hard, outdoor 22–28 February 1999 | 64 | SF | (France) Nathalie Dechy | #43 | Win | 6–1, 6–4 |
| Open Gaz de France; Paris, France; Tier II; Hard, outdoor 22–28 February 1999 | 65 | F | (France) Amélie Mauresmo | #18 | Win | 6–2, 3–6, 7–6^{(7–4)} |
| Evert Cup; Indian Wells, USA; Tier I Hard, outdoor 1–14 March 1999 | 66 | 1R | (Czech Republic) Jessica Steck | #230 | Win | 6–1, 7–5 |
| Evert Cup; Indian Wells, USA; Tier I Hard, outdoor 1–14 March 1999 | 67 | 2R | (United States) Lindsay Davenport | #2 | Win | 6–4, 6–2 |
| Evert Cup; Indian Wells, USA; Tier I Hard, outdoor 1–14 March 1999 | 68 | 3R | (Zimbabwe) Cara Black | #36 | Win | 6–0, 7–5 |
| Evert Cup; Indian Wells, USA; Tier I Hard, outdoor 1–14 March 1999 | 69 | QF | (France) Mary Pierce | #8 | Win | 7–5, 7–6^{(7–1)} |
| Evert Cup; Indian Wells, USA; Tier I Hard, outdoor 1–14 March 1999 | 70 | SF | (France) Sandrine Testud | #14 | Win | 7–5, 6–0 |
| Evert Cup; Indian Wells, USA; Tier I Hard, outdoor 1–14 March 1999 | 71 | F | (Germany) Steffi Graf | #7 | Win | 6–3, 3–6, 7–5 |
| Lipton Championships; Miami, USA; Tier I Hard, outdoor 15–28 March 1999 | - | 1R | Bye | | | |
| Lipton Championships; Miami, USA; Tier I Hard, outdoor 15–28 March 1999 | 72 | 2R | (Australia) Alicia Molik | #107 | Win | 6–2, 6–3 |
| Lipton Championships; Miami, USA; Tier I Hard, outdoor 15–28 March 1999 | 73 | 3R | (Spain) Magüi Serna | #25 | Win | 6–3, 6–2 |
| Lipton Championships; Miami, USA; Tier I Hard, outdoor 15–28 March 1999 | 74 | 4R | (United States) Monica Seles | #3 | Win | 6–2, 6–3 |
| Lipton Championships; Miami, USA; Tier I Hard, outdoor 15–28 March 1999 | 75 | QF | (South Africa) Amanda Coetzer | #9 | Win | 6–4, 6–0 |
| Lipton Championships; Miami, USA; Tier I Hard, outdoor 15–28 March 1999 | 76 | SF | (Switzerland) Martina Hingis | #1 | Win | 6–4, 7–6^{(7–3)} |
| Lipton Championships; Miami, USA; Tier I Hard, outdoor 15–28 March 1999 | 77 | F | (United States) Venus Williams | #6 | Loss | 6–1, 4–6, 6–4 |
| Italian Open; Rome, Italy; Tier I Clay, outdoor 3–9 May 1999 | - | 1R | Bye | | | |
| Italian Open; Rome, Italy; Tier I Clay, outdoor 3–9 May 1999 | 78 | 2R | (Russia) Tatiana Panova | #71 | Win | 6–4, 6–1 |
| Italian Open; Rome, Italy; Tier I Clay, outdoor 3–9 May 1999 | 79 | 3R | (Romania) Irina Spîrlea | #17 | Win | 6–2, 6–3 |
| Italian Open; Rome, Italy; Tier I Clay, outdoor 3–9 May 1999 | 80 | QF | (Switzerland) Martina Hingis | #1 | Loss | 2–6, 2–6 |
| German Open; Berlin, Germany; Tier I Clay, outdoor 10–16 May 1999 | - | 1R | Bye | | | |
| German Open; Berlin, Germany; Tier I Clay, outdoor 10–16 May 1999 | 81 | 2R | (United States) Jennifer Capriati | #115 | Win | 7–6^{(7–3)}, 6–3 |
| German Open; Berlin, Germany; Tier I Clay, outdoor 10–16 May 1999 | 82 | 3R | (United States) Lisa Raymond | #38 | Win | 6–1, 7–6^{(7–1)} |
| German Open; Berlin, Germany; Tier I Clay, outdoor 10–16 May 1999 | 83 | QF | (Spain) Arantxa Sánchez Vicario | #7 | Loss | 3–6, 2–3 Ret |
| French Open; Paris, France; Grand Slam; Clay, outdoor 25 May – 7 June 1999 | 84 | 1R | (France) Laurence Courtois | #99 | Win | 6–0, 6–4 |
| French Open; Paris, France; Grand Slam; Clay, outdoor 25 May – 7 June 1999 | 85 | 2R | (Argentina) Mariana Díaz Oliva | #94 | Win | 6–3, 6–4 |
| French Open; Paris, France; Grand Slam; Clay, outdoor 25 May – 7 June 1999 | 86 | 3R | (United States) Mary Joe Fernández | #37 | Loss | 3–6, 6–1, 0–6 |
| Fed Cup WG: USA vs. Italy; Ancona, Italy; Team Event; Clay; July 19–25, 1999 | 87 | – | (Italy) Rita Grande | NR | Win | 6–1, 6–1 |
| Acura Classic; Los Angeles, USA; Tier II; Hard; 9–15 August 1999 | 88 | 1R | (Russia) Elena Likhovtseva | #21 | Win | 4–6, 6–3, 6–1 |
| Acura Classic; Los Angeles, USA; Tier II; Hard; 9–15 August 1999 | 89 | 2R | (Switzerland) Patty Schnyder | #19 | Win | 6–3, 6–1 |
| Acura Classic; Los Angeles, USA; Tier II; Hard; 9–15 August 1999 | 90 | QF | (Spain) Arantxa Sánchez Vicario | #8 | Win | 6–2, 6–3 |
| Acura Classic; Los Angeles, USA; Tier II; Hard; 9–15 August 1999 | 91 | SF | (Switzerland) Martina Hingis | #1 | Win | 6–3, 7–5 |
| Acura Classic; Los Angeles, USA; Tier II; Hard; 9–15 August 1999 | 92 | F | (France) Julie Halard-Decugis | #16 | Win | 6–1, 6–4 |
| US Open; New York City, USA; Grand Slam; Hard, outdoor 30 August – 12 September 1999 | 93 | 1R | (United States) Kimberly Po | #80 | Win | 6–1, 6–0 |
| US Open; New York City, USA; Grand Slam; Hard, outdoor 30 August – 12 September 1999 | 94 | 2R | (Croatia) Jelena Kostanić | #128 | Win | 6–4, 6–2 |
| US Open; New York City, USA; Grand Slam; Hard, outdoor 30 August – 12 September 1999 | 95 | 3R | (Belgium) Kim Clijsters | #98 | Win | 4–6, 6–2, 7–5 |
| US Open; New York City, USA; Grand Slam; Hard, outdoor 30 August – 12 September 1999 | 96 | 4R | (Spain) Conchita Martínez | #16 | Win | 4–6, 6–2, 6–2 |
| US Open; New York City, USA; Grand Slam; Hard, outdoor 30 August – 12 September 1999 | 97 | QF | (United States) Monica Seles | #4 | Win | 4–6, 6–3, 6–2 |
| US Open; New York City, USA; Grand Slam; Hard, outdoor 30 August – 12 September 1999 | 98 | SF | (United States) Lindsay Davenport | #2 | Win | 6–4, 1–6, 6–4 |
| US Open; New York City, USA; Grand Slam; Hard, outdoor 30 August – 12 September 1999 | 99 | F | (Switzerland) Martina Hingis | #1 | Win | 6–3, 7–6^{(7–4)} |
| Grand Slam Cup; Munich, Germany; Exhibition; Carpet, indoor 27 September – 3 October 1999 | 100 | QF | (Spain) Arantxa Sánchez Vicario | #15 | Win | 6–3, 6–1 |
| Grand Slam Cup; Munich, Germany; Exhibition; Carpet, indoor 27 September – 3 October 1999 | 101 | SF | (United States) Lindsay Davenport | #2 | Win | 6–3, 6–4 |
| Grand Slam Cup; Munich, Germany; Exhibition; Carpet, indoor 27 September – 3 October 1999 | 102 | F | (United States) Venus Williams | #15 | Win | 6–1, 3–6, 6–3 |
| Porsche Tennis Grand Prix; Filderstadt, Germany; Tier II; Hard, outdoor 4–10 October 1999 | - | 1R | Bye | | | |
| Porsche Tennis Grand Prix; Filderstadt, Germany; Tier II; Hard, outdoor 4–10 October 1999 | 103 | 2R | (France) Sandrine Testud | #13 | Loss | 6–3, 4–6, 5–7 |

=== Doubles matches ===
| Tournament | Match | Round | Partner | Opponents | Rank | Result | Score |
| Sydney International; Sydney, Australia; Tier II; Hard, outdoor 11–17 January 1999 | 28 | 1R | (United States) Venus Williams | (South Africa) Amanda Coetzer (Belarus) Natasha Zvereva | #25 #1 | Win | 7–5, 7–5 |
| Sydney International; Sydney, Australia; Tier II; Hard, outdoor 11–17 January 1999 | 29 | QF | (United States) Venus Williams | (Argentina) Inés Gorrochategui (Spain) Conchita Martínez | #99 #16 | Win | 6–4, 6–1 |
| Sydney International; Sydney, Australia; Tier II; Hard, outdoor 11–17 January 1999 | 30 | SF | (United States) Venus Williams | (United States) Mary Joe Fernández (Germany) Anke Huber | #78 #70 | Loss | 7–6^{(9–7)}, 5–7, 5–7 |
| Australian Open; Melbourne, Australia; Grand Slam; Hard, outdoor 18–31 January 1999 | 31 | 1R | (United States) Venus Williams | (Australia) Catherine Barclay-Reitz (Australia) Kerry-Anne Guse | #44 #29 | Win | 6–4, 6–1 |
| Australian Open; Melbourne, Australia; Grand Slam; Hard, outdoor 18–31 January 1999 | 32 | 2R | (United States) Venus Williams | (Germany) Christina Singer (Czech Republic) Helena Vildová | #114 #86 | Win | 6–3, 6–1 |
| Australian Open; Melbourne, Australia; Grand Slam; Hard, outdoor 18–31 January 1999 | 33 | 3R | (United States) Venus Williams | (South Africa) Mariaan de Swardt (Ukraine) Elena Tatarkova | #16 #21 | Win | 7–6^{(7–3)}, 6–2 |
| Australian Open; Melbourne, Australia; Grand Slam; Hard, outdoor 18–31 January 1999 | 34 | QF | (United States) Venus Williams | (Spain) Arantxa Sánchez Vicario (Latvia) Larisa Neiland | #12 #10 | Win | 6–4, 4–6, 6–1 |
| Australian Open; Melbourne, Australia; Grand Slam; Hard, outdoor 18–31 January 1999 | 35 | SF | (United States) Venus Williams | (United States) Lindsay Davenport (Belarus) Natasha Zvereva | #4 #1 | Loss | 6–1, 4–6, 4–6 |
| Faber Grand Prix; Hanover, Germany; Tier II; Hard, indoorS; 15–22 February 1999 | 36 | 1R | (United States) Venus Williams | (Germany) Elena Wagner (Germany) Anne-Gaëlle Sidot | #89 #59 | Win | 6–1, 6–1 |
| Faber Grand Prix; Hanover, Germany; Tier II; Hard, indoorS; 15–22 February 1999 | 37 | QF | (United States) Venus Williams | (Netherlands) Manon Bollegraf (Netherlands) Caroline Vis | #19 #14 | Win | 6–1, 6–4 |
| Faber Grand Prix; Hanover, Germany; Tier II; Hard, indoorS; 15–22 February 1999 | 38 | SF | (United States) Venus Williams | (Russia) Elena Likhovtseva (Japan) Ai Sugiyama | #11 #15 | Win | 6–2, 7–6^{(10–8)} |
| Faber Grand Prix; Hanover, Germany; Tier II; Hard, indoorS; 15–22 February 1999 | 39 | F | (United States) Venus Williams | (France) Alexandra Fusai (France) Nathalie Tauziat | #9 #8 | Win | 5–7, 6–2, 6–2 |
| Evert Cup; Indian Wells, USA; Tier I Hard, outdoor 1–14 March 1999 | 40 | 1R | (United States) Venus Williams | (United States) Katrina Adams (United States) Debbie Graham | #33 #34 | Win | 6–0, 6–1 |
| Evert Cup; Indian Wells, USA; Tier I Hard, outdoor 1–14 March 1999 | 41 | 2R | (United States) Venus Williams | (Italy) Silvia Farina Elia (United States) Linda Wild | #22 #196 | Win | 4–6, 6–2, 6–2 |
| Evert Cup; Indian Wells, USA; Tier I Hard, outdoor 1–14 March 1999 | 42 | QF | (United States) Venus Williams | (United States) Lindsay Davenport (Belarus) Natasha Zvereva | #4 #1 | Win | 4–6, 6–2, 6–3 |
| Evert Cup; Indian Wells, USA; Tier I Hard, outdoor 1–14 March 1999 | 43 | SF | (United States) Venus Williams | (United States) Mary Joe Fernández (Czech Republic) Jana Novotná | #50 #3 | Loss | 3–6, 4–6 |
| Lipton Championships; Miami, USA; Tier I Hard, outdoor 15–28 March 1999 | – | 1R | Bye | | | | |
| Lipton Championships; Miami, USA; Tier I Hard, outdoor 15–28 March 1999 | 44 | 2R | (United States) Venus Williams | (United States) Debbie Graham (Italy) Rita Grande | #35 #102 | Win | 6–4, 7–5 |
| Lipton Championships; Miami, USA; Tier I Hard, outdoor 15–28 March 1999 | – | 3R | (United States) Venus Williams | (Italy) Silvia Farina Elia (Slovakia) Karina Habšudová | #33 #37 | Withdrew | N/A |
| French Open; Paris, France; Grand Slam; Clay, outdoor 24 May – 6 June 1999 | 45 | 1R | (United States) Venus Williams | (South Africa) Amanda Coetzer (Argentina) Inés Gorrochategui | #41 #78 | Win | 6–2, 6–3 |
| French Open; Paris, France; Grand Slam; Clay, outdoor 24 May – 6 June 1999 | 46 | 2R | (United States) Venus Williams | (United States) Amy Frazier (United States) Katie Schlukebir | #72 #56 | Win | 6–3, 6–2 |
| French Open; Paris, France; Grand Slam; Clay, outdoor 24 May – 6 June 1999 | 47 | 3R | (United States) Venus Williams | (Brazil) Vanessa Menga (Germany) Elena Wagner | #112 #99 | Win | 6–1, 6–3 |
| French Open; Paris, France; Grand Slam; Clay, outdoor 24 May – 6 June 1999 | 48 | QF | (United States) Venus Williams | (Belgium) Els Callens (Italy) Rita Grande | #33 #88 | Win | 6–0, 7–5 |
| French Open; Paris, France; Grand Slam; Clay, outdoor 24 May – 6 June 1999 | 49 | SF | (United States) Venus Williams | (United States) Lindsay Davenport (France) Mary Pierce | #4 #53 | Win | 6–4, 6–1 |
| French Open; Paris, France; Grand Slam; Clay, outdoor 24 May – 6 June 1999 | 50 | F | (United States) Venus Williams | (Switzerland) Martina Hingis (Russia) Anna Kournikova | #2 #5 | Win | 6–3, 6–7^{(2–7)}, 8–6 |
| Fed Cup WG: USA vs. Italy; Ancona, Italy; Team Event; Clay; July 19–25, 1999 | 51 | – | (United States) Venus Williams | (Italy) Tathiana Garbin (Italy) Adriana Serra Zanetti | #187 #207 | Win | 6–2, 6–2 |
| TIG Tennis Classic; San Diego, USA; Tier II; Hard; 2–8 August 1999 | 52 | 1R | (United States) Venus Williams | (Slovenia) Tina Križan (Slovenia) Katarina Srebotnik | #52 #33 | Win | 1–6, 6–2, 6–2 |
| TIG Tennis Classic; San Diego, USA; Tier II; Hard; 2–8 August 1999 | 53 | QF | (United States) Venus Williams | (Zimbabwe) Cara Black (Romania) Cătălina Cristea | #28 #60 | Win | 6–2, 6–3 |
| TIG Tennis Classic; San Diego, USA; Tier II; Hard; 2–8 August 1999 | 54 | SF | (United States) Venus Williams | (Russia) Elena Likhovtseva (Japan) Ai Sugiyama | #7 #12 | Win | 6–2, 6–0 |
| TIG Tennis Classic; San Diego, USA; Tier II; Hard; 2–8 August 1999 | 55 | F | (United States) Venus Williams | (United States) Lindsay Davenport (United States) Corina Morariu | #3 #17 | Loss | 4–6, 1–6 |
| US Open; New York City, USA; Grand Slam; Hard, outdoor 30 August – 12 September 1999 | 56 | 1R | (United States) Venus Williams | (Japan) Miho Saeki (Japan) Yuka Yoshida | #57 #56 | Win | 6–2, 6–3 |
| US Open; New York City, USA; Grand Slam; Hard, outdoor 30 August – 12 September 1999 | 57 | 2R | (United States) Venus Williams | (South Africa) Amanda Coetzer (Argentina) Inés Gorrochategui | #38 #67 | Win | 6–7^{(6–8)}, 6–4, 6–4 |
| US Open; New York City, USA; Grand Slam; Hard, outdoor 30 August – 12 September 1999 | 58 | 3R | (United States) Venus Williams | (United States) Linda Wild (United States) Nana Smith | #69 #72 | Win | 6–4, 6–1 |
| US Open; New York City, USA; Grand Slam; Hard, outdoor 30 August – 12 September 1999 | 59 | QF | (United States) Venus Williams | (United States) Mary Joe Fernández (United States) Monica Seles | #23 #24 | Win | 6–3, 6–3 |
| US Open; New York City, USA; Grand Slam; Hard, outdoor 30 August – 12 September 1999 | 60 | SF | (United States) Venus Williams | (France) Mary Pierce (Austria) Barbara Schett | #22 #32 | Win | 7–6^{(7–2)}, 6–3 |
| US Open; New York City, USA; Grand Slam; Hard, outdoor 30 August – 12 September 1999 | 61 | F | (United States) Venus Williams | (United States) Chanda Rubin (France) Sandrine Testud | #51 #68 | Win | 6–3, 7–6^{(7–4)} |
| Fed Cup WG: USA vs. Russia; Stanford; Team Event; Clay; September 13–19, 1999 | 62 | – | (United States) Venus Williams | (Russia) Elena Dementieva (Russia) Elena Makarova | #NA #330 | Win | 6–2, 6–1 |

=== Mixed doubles matches ===
| Tournament | Match | Round | Partner | Opponents | Rank | Result | Score |
| Australian Open; Melbourne, Australia; Grand Slam; Hard, outdoor 18–30 January 1999 | 18 | 1R | (Belarus) Max Mirnyi | (Australia) Rennae Stubbs (United States) Jim Grabb | #5 #18 | Win | 6–1, 7–6^{(7–2)} |
| Australian Open; Melbourne, Australia; Grand Slam; Hard, outdoor 18–30 January 1999 | 19 | 2R | (Belarus) Max Mirnyi | (Russia) Elena Likhovtseva (United States) Jeff Tarango | #9 #53 | Win | 6–4, 6–4 |
| Australian Open; Melbourne, Australia; Grand Slam; Hard, outdoor 18–30 January 1999 | 20 | QF | (Belarus) Max Mirnyi | (Belgium) Els Callens (South Africa) Chris Haggard | #45 #47 | Win | 6–3, 6–4 |
| Australian Open; Melbourne, Australia; Grand Slam; Hard, outdoor 18–30 January 1999 | 21 | SF | (Belarus) Max Mirnyi | (Netherlands) Manon Bollegraf (Argentina) Pablo Albano | #18 #51 | Win | 6–4, 6–4 |
| Australian Open; Melbourne, Australia; Grand Slam; Hard, outdoor 18–30 January 1999 | 22 | F | (Belarus) Max Mirnyi | (South Africa) Mariaan de Swardt (South Africa) David Adams | #16 #34 | Loss | 6–4, 4–6, 7–6^{(7–5)} |

== Tournament schedule ==
=== Singles schedule ===
Williams' 1999 singles tournament schedule is as follows:

| Date | Championship | Location | Category | Surface | Points | Outcome |
|---|---|---|---|---|---|---|
| 11 January 1999– 17 January 1999 | Sydney International | Sydney (AUS) | WTA Tier II | Hard | 26 | Second Round lost to Steffi Graf 2–6, 6–3, 5–7 |
| 18 January 1999– 31 January 1999 | Australian Openl | Melbourne (AUS) | Grand Slam | Hard | 44 | Third Round lost to Sandrine Testud 2–6, 6–2, 7–9 |
| 22 February 1999– 28 February 1999 | Open Gaz de France | Paris (FRA) | WTA Tier II | Hard | 200 | Winner defeated Amélie Mauresmo 6–2, 3–6, 7–6^{(7–4)} |
| 1 March 1999– 14 March 1999 | Evert Cup | Indian Wells (USA) | WTA Tier I | Hard | 260 | Winner defeated Steffi Graf 6–3, 3–6, 7–5 |
| 15 March 1999– 28 March 1999 | Lipton Championships | Miami (USA) | WTA Tier I | Hard | 182 | Final lost to Venus Williams 6–1, 4–6, 6–4 |
| 3 May 1999– 9 May 1999 | Italian Open | Rome (ITA) | WTA Tier I | Clay | 65 | Quarterfinals lost to Martina Hingis 2–6, 2–6 |
| 10 May 1999– 16 May 1999 | German Open | Berlin (GER) | WTA Tier I | Clay | 65 | Quarterfinals lost to Arantxa Sánchez Vicario 3–6, 2–3 Ret |
| 24 May 1999– 6 June 1999 | French Open | Paris (FRA) | Grand Slam | Clay | 44 | Third Round lost to Mary Joe Fernández 3–6, 6–1, 0–6 |
| 19 July 1999– 25 July 1999 | Fed Cup World Group: Italy vs. United States | Ancona (ITA) | Fed Cup | Clay | | United States def. Italy, 4–1; United States Advanced to Fed Cup Final |
| 9 August 1999– 15 August 1999 | Acura Classic | Los Angeles (USA) | WTA Tier II | Hard | 200 | Winner defeated Julie Halard-Decugis 6–1, 6–4 |
| 30 August 1999– 12 September 1999 | US Open | New York City (USA) | Grand Slam | Hard | 520 | Winner defeated Martina Hingis 6–3, 7–6^{(7–4)} |
| 27 September 1999– 3 October 1999 | Grand Slam Cup | Munich (GER) | Exhibition | Carpet (i) | | Winner defeated Venus Williams 6–1, 3–6, 6–3 |
| 4 October 1999– 10 October 1999 | Porsche Tennis Grand Prix | Filderstadt (GER) | WTA Tier II | Hard | 1 | Second Round lost to Sandrine Testud 6–3, 4–6, 5–7 |
| 1999 Total year-end points | | | | | 1607 | |

=== Doubles schedule ===
Williams' 1999 doubles tournament schedule is as follows:

| Date | Championship | Location | Category | Partner | Surface | Points | Outcome |
|---|---|---|---|---|---|---|---|
| 11 January 1999– 17 January 1999 | Sydney International | Sydney (AUS) | WTA Tier II | (United States) Venus Williams | Hard | 90 | Semifinals lost to Fernández/Huber 7–6^{(9–7)}, 5–7, 5–7 |
| 18 January 1999– 31 January 1999 | Australian Openl | Melbourne (AUS) | Grand Slam | (United States) Venus Williams | Hard | 234 | Semifinals lost to Davenport/Zvereva 6–1, 4–6, 4–6 |
| 15 February 1999– 21 February 1999 | Faber Grand Prix | Hanover (GER) | WTA Tier II | (United States) Venus Williams | Hard (i) | 200 | Winner defeated Fusai/Tauziat 5–7, 6–2, 6–2 |
| 1 March 1999– 14 March 1999 | Evert Cup | Indian Wells (USA) | WTA Tier I | (United States) Venus Williams | Hard | 117 | Semifinals lost to Fernández/Novotná 3–6, 4–6 |
| 15 March 1999– 28 March 1999 | Lipton Championships | Miami (USA) | WTA Tier I | (United States) Venus Williams | Hard | 36 | Third Round; Withdrew against Elia/Habšudová |
| 24 May 1999– 6 June 1999 | French Open | Paris (FRA) | Grand Slam | (United States) Venus Williams | Clay | 520 | Winner defeated Hingis/Kournikova 6–3, 6–7^{(2–7)}, 8–6 |
| 19 July 1999– 25 July 1999 | Fed Cup World Group: Italy vs. United States | Ancona (ITA) | Fed Cup | (United States) Venus Williams | Clay | | United States def. Italy, 4–1; United States Advanced to Fed Cup Final |
| 2 August 1999– 8 August 1999 | TIG Tennis Classic | San Diego (USA) | WTA Tier II | (United States) Venus Williams | Hard | 140 | Final lost to Davenport/Morariu 4–6, 1–6 |
| 30 August 1999– 12 September 1999 | US Open | New York City (USA) | Grand Slam | (United States) Venus Williams | Hard | 520 | Winner defeated Rubin/Testud 6–3, 7–6^{(7–4)} |
| 19 July 1999– 25 July 1999 | Fed Cup World Group: United States vs. Russia | Stanford (USA) | Fed Cup | (United States) Venus Williams | Clay | | United States def. Russia, 4–1; United States Wins Fed Cup Title |
| 1999 Total year-end points | | | | | | 2117 | |

=== Mixed doubles schedule ===
Williams' 1999 doubles tournament schedule is as follows:

| Date | Championship | Location | Category | Partner | Surface | Outcome |
|---|---|---|---|---|---|---|
| 18 January 1999- 30 January 1999 | Australian Open | Melbourne (AUS) | Grand Slam | (Belarus) Max Mirnyi | Hard | Final lost to de Swardt/ (South Africa) Adams 6–4, 4–6, 7–6^{(7–5)} |

== Yearly records ==
=== Head-to-head matchups ===
- (United States) Lindsay Davenport 3–0
- (France) Julie Halard-Decugis 2–0
- (Spain) Magüi Serna 2–0
- (United States) Monica Seles 2–0
- (Argentina) Inés Gorrochategui 1-0
- (Romania) Raluca Sandu 1–0
- (Sweden) Åsa Svensson 1–0
- (France) Nathalie Tauziat 1–0
- (United States) Lisa Raymond 1-0
- (United States) Kimberly Po 1–0
- (Croatia) Jelena Kostanić 1–0
- (France) Laurence Courtois 1–0
- (France) Nathalie Dechy 1–0
- (France) Amélie Mauresmo 1–0
- (Czech Republic) Jessica Steck 1–0
- (Zimbabwe) Cara Black 1–0
- (France) Mary Pierce 1–0
- (Australia) Alicia Molik 1–0
- (South Africa) Amanda Coetzer 1–0
- (United States) Jennifer Capriati 1–0
- (Belgium) Kim Clijsters 1–0
- (Spain) Conchita Martínez 1–0
- (Italy) Rita Grande 1–0
- (Argentina) Mariana Díaz Oliva 1–0
- (Russia) Tatiana Panova 1–0
- (Romania) Irina Spîrlea 1–0
- (Russia) Elena Likhovtseva 1–0
- (Switzerland) Patty Schnyder 1–0
- (United States) Venus Williams 1–1
- (Germany) Steffi Graf 1-1
- (Switzerland) Martina Hingis 3–1
- (Spain) Arantxa Sánchez Vicario 2–1
- (France) Sandrine Testud 1–2
- (United States) Mary Joe Fernández 0–1

=== Finals ===
==== Singles: 6 (5–1) ====
| Winner — Legend Grand Slam tournaments (1–0) Grand Slam Cup (1–0) Tier I (1–1) Tier II (2–0) | Finals by Surface Hard (4–1) Carpet (1–0) | Finals by Surface Outdoors (4–1) Indoors (1–0) |

| Outcome | No. | Date | Championship | Surface | Opponent | Score |
|---|---|---|---|---|---|---|
| Winner | 1. | February 28, 1999 | Paris, France (1) | Carpet | (France) Amélie Mauresmo | 6–2, 3–6, 7–6^{(7–4)} |
| Winner | 2. | March 14, 1999 | Indian Wells, US (1) | Hard | (Germany) Steffi Graf | 6–3, 3–6, 7–5 |
| Runner-up | 1. | March 29, 1999 | Miami, US (1) | Hard | (United States) Venus Williams | 2–6, 6–4, 4–6 |
| Winner | 3. | August 15, 1999 | Los Angeles, US (1) | Hard | (France) Julie Halard-Decugis | 6–1, 6–4 |
| Winner | 4. | September 12, 1999 | US Open, New York City, US (1) | Hard | (Switzerland) Martina Hingis | 6–3, 7–6^{(7–4)} |
| Winner | 5. | October 3, 1999 | Grand Slam Cup, Germany (1) | Hard | (United States) Venus Williams | 6–1, 3–6, 6–3 |

==== Doubles: 4 (3–1) ====
| Legend Grand Slam tournaments (2–0) Tier II (1–1) | Finals by Surface Hard (1–1) Carpet (1–0) Clay (1–0) | Finals by Surface Outdoors (2–1) Indoors (1–0) |

| Outcome | No. | Date | Championship | Surface | Partner | Opponent | Score |
|---|---|---|---|---|---|---|---|
| Winner | 3. | February 15, 1999 | Hanover, Germany (1) | Carpet | (United States) Venus Williams | (France) Alexandra Fusai (France) Nathalie Tauziat | 5–7, 6–2, 6–2 |
| Winner | 4. | May 24, 1999 | French Open, Paris, France (1) | Clay | (United States) Venus Williams | (Switzerland) Martina Hingis (Russia) Anna Kournikova | 6–3, 6–7^{(2–7)}, 8–6 |
| Runner-up | 1. | August 8, 1999 | San Diego, US (1) | Hard | (United States) Venus Williams | (United States) Lindsay Davenport (United States) Corina Morariu | 6–4, 6–1 |
| Winner | 5. | August 30, 1999 | US Open, New York City, US (1) | Hard | (United States) Venus Williams | (United States) Chanda Rubin (France) Sandrine Testud | 4–6, 6–1, 6–4 |

==== Mixed doubles: (0-1) ====
| Legend Grand Slam (0–1) | Finals by Surface Hard (0–1) |

| Outcome | No. | Date | Championship | Surface | Partner | Opponent | Score |
|---|---|---|---|---|---|---|---|
| Runner-up | 2. | September 12, 1999 | Australian Open | Hard | (Belarus) Max Mirnyi | (South Africa) David Adams (South Africa) Mariaan de Swardt | 6–4, 4–6, 7–6^{(7–5)} |

=== Earnings ===
| # | Event | Prize money | Year-to-date |
|---|---|---|---|
| 1 | Sydney International | $5,450 | $5,450 |
| 1 | Sydney International (doubles) | $3,100 | $8,550 |
| 2 | Australian Open | $14,575 | $23,125 |
| 2 | Australian Open (doubles) | $18,934 | $42,059 |
| 3 | Faber Grand Prix (doubles) | $12,750 | $54,809 |
| 4 | Open Gaz de France | $80,000 | $134,809 |
| 5 | Evert Cup | $215,000 | $349,809 |
| 5 | Evert Cup (doubles) | $8,850 | $358,659 |
| 6 | Lipton Championships | $132,000 | $490,659 |
| 6 | Lipton Championships (doubles) | $3,138 | $493,797 |
| 7 | Italian Open | $16,000 | $509,797 |
| 8 | German Open | $16,000 | $525,797 |
| 9 | French Open | $20,990 | $546,787 |
| 9 | French Open (doubles) | $99,268 | $646,055 |
| 10 | Acura Classic | $80,000 | $726,055 |
| 11 | TIG Tennis Classic (doubles) | $6,500 | $732,555 |
| 12 | US Open | $750,000 | $1,482,555 |
| 12 | US Open (doubles) | $165,000 | $1,647,555 |
| 13 | Grand Slam Cup | $900,000 | $2,547,555 |
| 14 | Porsche Tennis Grand Prix | $3,700 | $2,551,255 |
| Bonus Pool | | $27,593 | $2,605,102 |
| | | | $2,605,102 |

Figures in United States dollars (USD) unless noted.

== See also ==
- 1999 WTA Tour

Sporting positions
| Preceded by Venus Williams; Angelique Kerber | World No. 1 First stint: July 8, 2002 – August 10, 2003; Last stint: April 24, 2017 – May 14, 2017 | Succeeded by Kim Clijsters; Angelique Kerber |
| Preceded by Jennifer Capriati; Justine Henin; Petra Kvitová | Year-end World No. 1; 2002; 2008, 2009; 2012 – 2015 | Succeeded by Justine Henin; Kim Clijsters; Angelique Kerber |
Awards
| Preceded by Jennifer Capriati; Jelena Janković; Petra Kvitová | ITF Women's Singles World Champion; 2002; 2009; 2012 – 2015 | Succeeded by Justine Henin; Caroline Wozniacki; Angelique Kerber |
| Preceded by Martina Hingis & Anna Kournikova; Cara Black & Liezel Huber | WTA Doubles Team of the Year; 2000 (with Venus Williams); 2009 (with Venus Williams) | Succeeded by Lisa Raymond & Rennae Stubbs; Gisela Dulko & Flavia Pennetta |
| Preceded by Cara Black & Liezel Huber | ITF Women's Doubles World Champion; 2009 (with Venus Williams) | Succeeded by Gisela Dulko & Flavia Pennetta |
