= 1995 Peters International – Men's doubles =

Men's doubles
- 1995 Peters International

Final
- Champions: (Australia) Todd Woodbridge (Australia) Mark Woodforde
- Runners-up: (United States) Trevor Kronemann (Australia) David Macpherson
- Score: 7–6, 6–4

Details
- Draw: 16 (3WC/1Q)
- Seeds: 4

Events
Singles	men	women
Doubles	men	women
← 1994 ·	Sydney International	· 1996 →

Darren Cahill and Sandon Stolle were the defending champions, but Cahill did not compete this year. Stolle teamed up with John Fitzgerald and lost in the first round to Jared Palmer and Richey Reneberg.

Todd Woodbridge and Mark Woodforde won the title by defeating Trevor Kronemann and David Macpherson 7–6, 6–4 in the final.

== Seeds ==
1. (Australia) Todd Woodbridge / (Australia) Mark Woodforde (champions)
2. (France) Olivier Delaître / (United States) Patrick McEnroe (first round)
3. (Czech Republic) Cyril Suk / (Czech Republic) Daniel Vacek (semifinals)
4. (Netherlands) Tom Nijssen / (Netherlands) Menno Oosting (first round)

== Draw ==
=== Key ===
- Q = Qualifier
- WC = Wild card
- LL = Lucky loser
- Alt = Alternate
- SE = Special exempt
- PR = Protected ranking
- ITF = ITF entry
- JE = Junior exempt
- w/o = Walkover
- r = Retired
- d = Defaulted
- SR = Special ranking

=== Draw ===
First round
1	(Australia) T Woodbridge (Australia) M Woodforde	6	3	7
(United States) E Ferreira (United States) R Randall	3	6	5
WC	(United States) L Jensen (United States) M Jensen	6	1
WC	(Ukraine) A Medvedev (Switzerland) M Rosset	7	6
4	(Netherlands) T Nijssen (Netherlands) M Oosting	3	2
(Czech Republic) P Korda (Czech Republic) K Nováček	6	6
Q	(United States) M Keil (Sweden) P Nyborg	6	5	6
(Sweden) N Kulti (Canada) S Lareau	4	7	4
(United States) J Palmer (United States) R Reneberg	6	3	6
(Australia) J Fitzgerald (Australia) S Stolle	4	6	3
(Czech Republic) M Damm (South Africa) B Talbot	2	4
3	(Czech Republic) C Suk (Czech Republic) D Vacek	6	6
WC	(Italy) A Gaudenzi (Austria) T Muster	4	6
(United States) M Bauer (United States) S Davis	6	7
(United States) T Kronemann (Australia) D Macpherson	6	7
2	(France) O Delaître (United States) P McEnroe	3	5

Quarterfinals
1	(Australia) T Woodbridge (Australia) M Woodforde	w/o
WC	(Ukraine) A Medvedev (Switzerland) M Rosset
(Czech Republic) P Korda (Czech Republic) K Nováček	7	7
Q	(United States) M Keil (Sweden) P Nyborg	5	6
(United States) J Palmer (United States) R Reneberg	5	3
3	(Czech Republic) C Suk (Czech Republic) D Vacek	7	6
(United States) M Bauer (United States) S Davis	4	3
(United States) T Kronemann (Australia) D Macpherson	6	6

Semifinals
1	(Australia) T Woodbridge (Australia) M Woodforde	7	6
(Czech Republic) P Korda (Czech Republic) K Nováček	5	4
3	(Czech Republic) C Suk (Czech Republic) D Vacek	4	7	4
(United States) T Kronemann (Australia) D Macpherson	6	5	6

Final
1	(Australia) T Woodbridge (Australia) M Woodforde	7	6
(United States) T Kronemann (Australia) D Macpherson	6	4
