= 1997 Sydney International – Women's singles =

Women's singles
- 1997 Sydney International
- 1996 Champion: (United States) Monica Seles

Final
- Champion: (Switzerland) Martina Hingis
- Runner-up: (United States) Jennifer Capriati
- Score: 6–1, 5–7, 6–1

Details
- Draw: 28
- Seeds: 8

Events
| Singles | men | women |
| Doubles | men | women |
| ← 1996 · | Sydney International | · 1998 → |

Monica Seles was the defending champion but did not compete that year.

Martina Hingis won in the final 6–1, 5–7, 6–1 against Jennifer Capriati.

== Seeds ==
A champion seed is indicated in bold text while text in italics indicates the round in which that seed was eliminated. The top four seeds received a bye to the second round.

1. (Spain) Arantxa Sánchez Vicario (second round)
2. (Switzerland) **Martina Hingis (champion)**
3. (Croatia) Iva Majoli (quarterfinals)
4. (United States) Lindsay Davenport (semifinals)
5. (Romania) Irina Spîrlea (first round)
6. (Slovakia) Karina Habšudová (first round)
7. (Netherlands) Brenda Schultz-McCarthy (first round)
8. n/a
9. (South Africa) Amanda Coetzer (first round)

== Draw ==
=== Key ===
- Q = Qualifier
- WC = Wild card
- LL = Lucky loser
- Alt = Alternate
- SE = Special exempt
- PR = Protected ranking
- ITF = ITF entry
- JE = Junior exempt
- w/o = Walkover
- r = Retired
- d = Defaulted
- SR = Special ranking

=== Final ===
| Final |
| | (United States) Jennifer Capriati | 1 | **7** | 1 |
| 2 | (Switzerland) **Martina Hingis** | **6** | 5 | **6** |

=== Section 1 ===
First round
LL | (Austria) S Dopfer | 2 | 3
(United States) **A Frazier** | **6** | **6**
(United States) C Rubin | 3 | **6** | 3
(United States) **J Capriati** | **6** | 4 | **6**
Q | (Canada) **R Simpson** | **6** | **7**
6 | (Slovakia) K Habšudová | 4 | 5
(Japan) A Sugiyama | 1 | 0
(United States) **L Raymond** | **6** | **6**
(Japan) **N Sawamatsu** | **7** | **6**
Q | (United States) M Tu | 5 | 3
WC | (Australia) **R McQuillan** | **6** | 6^{0} | **6**
7 | (Netherlands) B Schultz-McCarthy | 4 | **7^{7}** | 4

Second round
1 | (Spain) A Sánchez Vicario | 3 | 3
(United States) **A Frazier** | **6** | **6**
(United States) **J Capriati** | **6** | **6**
Q | (Canada) R Simpson | 3 | 2
4 | (United States) **L Davenport** | **6** | **6**
(United States) L Raymond | 3 | 4
(Japan) **N Sawamatsu** | **7** | **6**
WC | (Australia) R McQuillan | 5 | 3

Quarterfinals
(United States) A Frazier | 4 | 1
(United States) **J Capriati** | **6** | **6**
4 | (United States) **L Davenport** | **6** | 6^{4} | **6**
(Japan) N Sawamatsu | 3 | **7^{7}** | 1

Semifinals
(United States) **J Capriati** | 2 | **6** | **6**
4 | (United States) L Davenport | **6** | 4 | 2

=== Section 2 ===
First round
9 | (South Africa) A Coetzer | 1 | **6** | 2
(United States) **M J Fernández** | **6** | 3 | **6**
(United States) **K Po** | **6** | 3 | **6**
(Austria) J Wiesner | 2 | **6** | 4
Q | (France) **S Pitkowski** | **6** | **6**
(Belarus) N Zvereva | 0 | 0
5 | (Romania) I Spîrlea | 3 | **6** | 4
(France) **M Pierce** | **6** | 4 | **6**
WC | (Australia) N Bradtke | 3 | **6** | 0
(Indonesia) **Y Basuki** | **6** | 3 | **6**
(Belgium) **S Appelmans** | **6** | **6**
Q | (Germany) J Kandarr | 0 | 1

Second round
(United States) **M J Fernández** | **6** | **6**
(United States) K Po | 2 | 4
Q | (France) S Pitkowski | 2 | 1
3 | (Croatia) **I Majoli** | **6** | **6**
(France) M Pierce | 4 | 4
(Indonesia) **Y Basuki** | **6** | **6**
(Belgium) S Appelmans | 3 | **6** | 1
2 | (Switzerland) **M Hingis** | **6** | 3 | **6**

Quarterfinals
(United States) **M J Fernández** | **7** | **6**
3 | (Croatia) I Majoli | 5 | 4
(Indonesia) Y Basuki | 6^{6} | 1
2 | (Switzerland) **M Hingis** | **7^{8}** | **6**

Semifinals
(United States) M J Fernández | 3 | 2
2 | (Switzerland) **M Hingis** | **6** | **6**
