= 1996 Peters International – Men's doubles =

Men's doubles
- 1996 Peters International
- 1995 Champions: (Australia) Todd Woodbridge (Australia) Mark Woodforde

Final
- Champions: (South Africa) Ellis Ferreira (Netherlands) Jan Siemerink
- Runners-up: (United States) Patrick McEnroe (Australia) Sandon Stolle
- Score: 5–7, 6–4, 6–1

Events
Singles	men	women
Doubles	men	women
← 1995 ·	Sydney International	· 1997 →

Todd Woodbridge and Mark Woodforde were the defending champions but lost in the first round to Ellis Ferreira and Jan Siemerink.

Ferreira and Siemerink won in the final 5–7, 6–4, 6–1 against Patrick McEnroe and Sandon Stolle.

== Seeds ==
Champion seeds are indicated in bold text while text in italics indicates the round in which those seeds were eliminated.

1. (Australia) Todd Woodbridge / (Australia) Mark Woodforde (first round)
2. (Czech Republic) Cyril Suk / (Czech Republic) Daniel Vacek (semifinals)
3. (Canada) Grant Connell / (United States) Jonathan Stark (semifinals)
4. (United States) Patrick McEnroe / (Australia) Sandon Stolle (final)

== Draw ==
=== Key ===
- Q = Qualifier
- WC = Wild card
- LL = Lucky loser
- Alt = Alternate
- SE = Special exempt
- PR = Protected ranking
- ITF = ITF entry
- JE = Junior exempt
- w/o = Walkover
- r = Retired
- d = Defaulted
- SR = Special ranking

First round
1	(Australia) T Woodbridge (Australia) M Woodforde	6	3
(South Africa) **E Ferreira** (Netherlands) **J Siemerink**	**7**	**6**
WC	(Australia) **A Belobrajdic** (Australia) **G Doyle**	3	**6**	**7**
(United States) T Kronemann (Australia) D Macpherson	**6**	4	6
3	(Canada) **G Connell** (United States) **J Stark**	2	**6**	**6**
(Australia) J Eagle (Australia) A Florent	**6**	3	3
(Australia) **J Morgan** (Australia) **M Tebbutt**	**6**	**6**
(Spain) A Costa (Spain) C Costa	3	2
WC	(Australia) S Draper (Australia) J Ireland	5	4
(United States) **S Davis** (United States) **D Pate**	**7**	**6**
WC	(France) A Boetsch (Australia) M Philippoussis	2	4
4	(United States) **P McEnroe** (Australia) **S Stolle**	**6**	**6**
(Australia) P Kilderry (Australia) P Tramacchi	6	**6**	6
(United States) **L Jensen** (United States) **M Jensen**	**7**	3	**7**
(France) O Delaître (United States) M Lucena	**6**	3	4
2	(Czech Republic) **C Suk** (Czech Republic) **D Vacek**	3	**6**	**6**

Quarterfinals
(South Africa) **E Ferreira** (Netherlands) **J Siemerink**	**6**	**6**
WC	(Australia) A Belobrajdic (Australia) G Doyle	1	4
3	(Canada) **G Connell** (United States) **J Stark**	**6**	**6**
(Australia) J Morgan (Australia) M Tebbutt	4	3
(United States) S Davis (United States) D Pate	4	3
4	(United States) **P McEnroe** (Australia) **S Stolle**	**6**	**6**
(United States) L Jensen (United States) M Jensen	**6**	4	6
2	(Czech Republic) **C Suk** (Czech Republic) **D Vacek**	4	**6**	**7**

Semifinals
(South Africa) **E Ferreira** (Netherlands) **J Siemerink**	**6**	**7**
3	(Canada) G Connell (United States) J Stark	1	6
4	(United States) **P McEnroe** (Australia) **S Stolle**	**6**	3	**6**
2	(Czech Republic) C Suk (Czech Republic) D Vacek	3	**6**	3

Final
(South Africa) **Ellis Ferreira** (Netherlands) **Jan Siemerink**	5	**6**	**6**
4	(United States) Patrick McEnroe (Australia) Sandon Stolle	**7**	4	1
