= 1998 Sydney International – Women's doubles =

Women's doubles
- 1998 Sydney International
- 1997 Champions: (United States) Gigi Fernández (Spain) Arantxa Sánchez Vicario

Final
- Champions: (Switzerland) Martina Hingis (Czech Republic) Helena Suková
- Runners-up: (United States) Katrina Adams (United States) Meredith McGrath
- Score: 6–1, 6–2

Events
Singles	men	women
Doubles	men	women
← 1997 ·	Sydney International	· 1999 →

Gigi Fernández and Arantxa Sánchez Vicario were the defending champions but only Sánchez Vicario competed that year with Manon Bollegraf.

Bollegraf and Sánchez Vicario lost in the quarterfinals to Lisa Raymond and Rennae Stubbs.

Martina Hingis and Helena Suková won in the final 6–1, 6–2 against Katrina Adams and Meredith McGrath.

== Seeds ==
Champion seeds are indicated in bold text while text in italics indicates the round in which those seeds were eliminated.

1. (United States) Lindsay Davenport / (Belarus) Natasha Zvereva (semifinals)
2. (Netherlands) Manon Bollegraf / (Spain) Arantxa Sánchez Vicario (quarterfinals)
3. (Switzerland) **Martina Hingis** / (Czech Republic) **Helena Suková (champions)**
4. (Indonesia) Yayuk Basuki / (Netherlands) Caroline Vis (first round)

== Draw ==
=== Key ===
- Q = Qualifier
- WC = Wild card
- LL = Lucky loser
- Alt = Alternate
- SE = Special exempt
- PR = Protected ranking
- ITF = ITF entry
- JE = Junior exempt
- w/o = Walkover
- r = Retired
- d = Defaulted
- SR = Special ranking

First round
1	(United States) **L Davenport** (Belarus) **N Zvereva**	**6**	**6**
(Australia) K-A Guse (Australia) R McQuillan	3	1
(Spain) C Martínez (Argentina) P Tarabini	4	2
(South Africa) **A Coetzer** (Germany) **A Huber**	**6**	**6**
3	(Switzerland) **M Hingis** (Czech Republic) **H Suková**	**6**	**6**
(Netherlands) K Boogert (Japan) N Miyagi	3	3
(Japan) R Hiraki (Argentina) M Paz	5	2
(Argentina) **I Gorrochategui** (Romania) **I Spîrlea**	**7**	**6**
(United States) **K Adams** (United States) **M McGrath**	**6**	**6**
WC	(Australia) T Musgrave (Australia) L Pleming	4	4
(Russia) **A Kournikova** (Latvia) **L Savchenko**	**6**	**6**
4	(Indonesia) Y Basuki (Netherlands) C Vis	4	1
Q	(United States) E deLone (South Africa) L Horn	3	5
(United States) **L Raymond** (Australia) **R Stubbs**	**6**	**7**
(Belgium) S Appelmans (Netherlands) M Oremans	4	6
2	(Netherlands) **M Bollegraf** (Spain) **A Sánchez Vicario**	**6**	**7**

Quarterfinals
1	(United States) **L Davenport** (Belarus) **N Zvereva**	**6**	**6**
(South Africa) A Coetzer (Germany) A Huber	2	1
3	(Switzerland) **M Hingis** (Czech Republic) **H Suková**	**6**	**7**
(Argentina) I Gorrochategui (Romania) I Spîrlea	3	6
(United States) **K Adams** (United States) **M McGrath**	**6**	**6**
(Russia) A Kournikova (Latvia) L Savchenko	0	4
(United States) **L Raymond** (Australia) **R Stubbs**	**6**	2	**6**
2	(Netherlands) M Bollegraf (Spain) A Sánchez Vicario	0	**6**	4

Semifinals
1	(United States) L Davenport (Belarus) N Zvereva	**6**	1	2
3	(Switzerland) **M Hingis** (Czech Republic) **H Suková**	4	**6**	**6**
(United States) **K Adams** (United States) **M McGrath**	**6**	4	**6**
(United States) L Raymond (Australia) R Stubbs	4	**6**	4

Final
3	(Switzerland) **Martina Hingis** (Czech Republic) **Helena Suková**	**6**	**6**
(United States) Katrina Adams (United States) Meredith McGrath	1	2
