= 1996 Peters International – Men's singles =

Men's singles
- 1996 Peters International

Final
- Champion: (United States) Todd Martin
- Runner-up: (Croatia) Goran Ivanišević
- Score: 5–7, 6–3, 6–4

Details
- Draw: 32
- Seeds: 8

Events
Singles	men	women
Doubles	men	women
← 1995 ·	Sydney International	· 1997 →

Patrick McEnroe was the defending champion but lost in the second round to Richard Fromberg.

Todd Martin won in the final 5–7, 6–3, 6–4 against Goran Ivanišević.

== Seeds ==
A champion seed is indicated in bold text while text in italics indicates the round in which that seed was eliminated.

1. (Croatia) Goran Ivanišević (final)
2. (Netherlands) Richard Krajicek (first round)
3. (France) Arnaud Boetsch (first round)
4. n/a
5. (United States) **Todd Martin (champions)**
6. (Netherlands) Jan Siemerink (first round)
7. (Spain) Albert Costa (first round)
8. (Chile) Marcelo Ríos (first round)

== Draw ==
=== Key ===
- Q = Qualifier
- WC = Wild card
- LL = Lucky loser
- Alt = Alternate
- SE = Special exempt
- PR = Protected ranking
- ITF = ITF entry
- JE = Junior exempt
- w/o = Walkover
- r = Retired
- d = Defaulted
- SR = Special ranking

First round
1	(Croatia) **G Ivanišević**	**6**	**6**
(Germany) D Prinosil	3	3
LL	(Sweden) **M Norman**	3	**6**	**7**
(Germany) M-K Goellner	**6**	3	5
(Australia) M Philippoussis	4	2
Q	(United Kingdom) **T Henman**	**6**	**6**
(Australia) **M Woodforde**	4	**7^{7}**	**7**
7	(Spain) A Costa	**6**	6^{4}	5
Q	(Italy) C Caratti	2	6^{2}
(Slovakia) **K Kučera**	**6**	**7^{7}**
(Belgium) F Dewulf	2	3
WC	(Australia) **J Stoltenberg**	**6**	**6**
(Czech Republic) D Vacek	6^{3}	6^{3}
(Australia) **T Woodbridge**	**7^{7}**	**7^{7}**
LL	(Canada) **S Lareau**	**6**	**7**
6	(Netherlands) J Siemerink	4	5
5	(United States) **T Martin**	**6**	**6**
(Germany) M Sinner	1	2
(Spain) **C Costa**	**6**	5	**6**
(Czech Republic) B Ulihrach	4	**7**	4
(United States) **P McEnroe**	**6**	4	**6**
(Germany) B Karbacher	2	**6**	4
WC	(Australia) **R Fromberg**	4	**6**	**6**
3	(France) A Boetsch	**6**	3	3
8	(Chile) M Ríos	1	6^{4}
(Italy) **R Furlan**	**6**	**7^{7}**
(Zimbabwe) B Black	**6**	2	5
WC	(Australia) **S Draper**	4	**6**	**7**
Q	(Australia) P Kilderry	1	4
Q	(Germany) **C Arriens**	**6**	**6**
(United Kingdom) **G Rusedski**	**7^{7}**	**7^{8}**
2	(Netherlands) R Krajicek	6^{4}	6^{6}

Second round
1	(Croatia) **G Ivanišević**	**6**	6^{5}	**6**
LL	(Sweden) M Norman	4	**7^{7}**	3
Q	(United Kingdom) T Henman	**6**	3	3
(Australia) **M Woodforde**	3	**6**	**6**
(Slovakia) K Kučera	**6**	2	6^{3}
WC	(Australia) **J Stoltenberg**	4	**6**	**7^{7}**
(Australia) **T Woodbridge**	**6**	**6**
LL	(Canada) S Lareau	3	4
5	(United States) **T Martin**	**6**	3	**6**
(Spain) C Costa	3	**6**	3
(United States) P McEnroe	4	1
WC	(Australia) **R Fromberg**	**6**	**6**
(Italy) R Furlan	1	5
WC	(Australia) **S Draper**	**6**	**7**
Q	(Germany) C Arriens	0	0
(United Kingdom) **G Rusedski**	**6**	**6**

Quarterfinals
1	(Croatia) **G Ivanišević**	**6**	**7**
(Australia) M Woodforde	4	5
WC	(Australia) J Stoltenberg	3	**7**	2
(Australia) **T Woodbridge**	**6**	5	**6**
5	(United States) **T Martin**	**6**	**6**
WC	(Australia) R Fromberg	3	2
WC	(Australia) S Draper	4	**6**	3
(United Kingdom) **G Rusedski**	**6**	4	**6**

Semifinals
1	(Croatia) **G Ivanišević**	**6**	**7^{8}**
(Australia) T Woodbridge	3	6^{6}
5	(United States) **T Martin**	**7**	**7^{7}**
(United Kingdom) G Rusedski	5	6^{2}

Final
1	(Croatia) Goran Ivanišević	**7**	3	4
5	(United States) **Todd Martin**	5	**6**	**6**
