= 1996 Peters International – Women's doubles =

Women's doubles
- 1996 Peters International
- 1995 Champions: (United States) Lindsay Davenport (Czech Republic) Jana Novotná

Final
- Champions: (United States) Lindsay Davenport (United States) Mary Joe Fernández
- Runners-up: (United States) Lori McNeil (Czech Republic) Helena Suková
- Score: 6–3, 6–3

Events
Singles	men	women
Doubles	men	women
← 1995 ·	Sydney International	· 1997 →

Lindsay Davenport and Jana Novotná were the defending champions but only Davenport competed that year with Mary Joe Fernández.

Davenport and Fernández won in the final 6–3, 6–3 against Lori McNeil and Helena Suková.

== Seeds ==
Champion seeds are indicated in bold text while text in italics indicates the round in which those seeds were eliminated.

1. (United States) **Lindsay Davenport** / (United States) **Mary Joe Fernández (champions)**
2. (United States) Lori McNeil / (Czech Republic) Helena Suková (final)
3. n/a
4. (United States) Lisa Raymond / (Argentina) Gabriela Sabatini (semifinals)

== Draw ==
=== Key ===
- Q = Qualifier
- WC = Wild card
- LL = Lucky loser
- Alt = Alternate
- SE = Special exempt
- PR = Protected ranking
- ITF = ITF entry
- JE = Junior exempt
- w/o = Walkover
- r = Retired
- d = Defaulted
- SR = Special ranking

First round
1	(United States) **L Davenport** (United States) **M J Fernández**	6	**6**	**6**
(Canada) J Hetherington (Australia) K Radford	**7**	2	2
(United States) **A Frazier** (United States) **K Po**	**6**	**6**
Q	(Romania) C Cristea (Federal Republic of Yugoslavia) T Ječmenica	2	1
LL	(Australia) C Barclay (Australia) J Byrne	2	4
(Netherlands) **K Boogert** (Australia) **N Bradtke**	**6**	**6**
WC	(Australia) T Musgrave (Australia) K Sharpe	4	1
(South Africa) **A Coetzer** (South Africa) **M de Swardt**	**6**	**6**
Q	(Belgium) D Van Roost (Croatia) M Murić	5	2
(Romania) **R Dragomir** (Argentina) **P Tarabini**	**7**	**6**
(United States) N Arendt (Romania) I Spîrlea	4	**7**	3
4	(United States) **L Raymond** (Argentina) **G Sabatini**	**6**	5	**6**
(Australia) R McQuillan (United States) S Stafford	**6**	1	1
(Switzerland) **M Hingis** (United States) **C Rubin**	3	**6**	**6**
(United States) P Shriver (Australia) E Smylie	4	4
2	(United States) **L McNeil** (Czech Republic) **H Suková**	**6**	**6**

Quarterfinals
1	(United States) **L Davenport** (United States) **M J Fernández**	**6**	**6**
(United States) A Frazier (United States) K Po	4	2
(Netherlands) **K Boogert** (Australia) **N Bradtke**	**6**	**6**
(South Africa) A Coetzer (South Africa) M de Swardt	4	2
(Romania) R Dragomir (Argentina) P Tarabini	3	1
4	(United States) **L Raymond** (Argentina) **G Sabatini**	**6**	**6**
(Switzerland) M Hingis (United States) C Rubin	4	6
2	(United States) **L McNeil** (Czech Republic) **H Suková**	**6**	**7**

Semifinals
1	(United States) **L Davenport** (United States) **M J Fernández**	3	**6**	**7**
(Netherlands) K Boogert (Australia) N Bradtke	**6**	3	5
4	(United States) L Raymond (Argentina) G Sabatini	4	4
2	(United States) **L McNeil** (Czech Republic) **H Suková**	**6**	**6**

Final
1	(United States) **Lindsay Davenport** (United States) **Mary Joe Fernández**	**6**	**6**
2	(United States) Lori McNeil (Czech Republic) Helena Suková	3	3
