= 1996 Peters International =

- Date: 8–14 January
- Edition: 104th
- Surface: Hard / outdoor
- Location: Sydney, Australia
- Venue: White City Stadium

Champions

Men's singles
- (United States) Todd Martin

Women's singles
- (United States) Monica Seles

Men's doubles
- (South Africa) Ellis Ferreira / (Netherlands) Jan Siemerink

Women's doubles
- (United States) Lindsay Davenport / (United States) Mary Joe Fernández
- Peters International

The 1996 Peters International was a tennis tournament played on outdoor hard courts at the White City Stadium in Sydney in Australia that was part of the World Series of the 1996 ATP Tour and of Tier II of the 1996 WTA Tour. The tournament ran from 8 January until 14 January 1996. Todd Martin and Monica Seles won the singles titles.

== Finals ==
=== Men's singles ===
(United States) Todd Martin defeated (Croatia) Goran Ivanišević 5–7, 6–3, 6–4

- It was Martin's 1st title of the year and the 9th of his career.

=== Women's singles ===
(United States) Monica Seles defeated (United States) Lindsay Davenport 4–6, 7–6, 6–3

- It was Seles' 1st title of the year and the 38th of her career.

=== Men's doubles ===
(South Africa) Ellis Ferreira / (Netherlands) Jan Siemerink defeated (United States) Patrick McEnroe / (Australia) Sandon Stolle 5–7, 6–4, 6–1

- It was Ferreira's 1st title of the year and the 2nd of his career. It was Siemerink's 1st title of the year and the 8th of his career.

=== Women's doubles ===
(United States) Lindsay Davenport / (United States) Mary Joe Fernández defeated (United States) Lori McNeil / (Czech Republic) Helena Suková 6–3, 6–3

- It was Davenport's 1st title of the year and the 11th of her career. It was Fernandez's 1st title of the year and the 19th of her career.
