= 1995 Peters International – Men's singles =

Men's singles
- 1995 Peters International
- 1994 Champion: (United States) Pete Sampras

Final
- Champion: (United States) Patrick McEnroe
- Runner-up: (Australia) Richard Fromberg
- Score: 6–2, 7–6^{(7–4)}

Details
- Draw: 32
- Seeds: 8

Events
Singles	men	women
Doubles	men	women
← 1994 ·	Sydney International	· 1996 →

The men's singles of the 1995 Peters International tennis competition took place from the 9–15 January and was part of the 1995 ATP Tour. Defending champion, Pete Sampras didn't compete in the tournament. In the final, unseeded American player Patrick McEnroe won 6–2, 7–6^{(7–4)} over Australian player Richard Fromberg who was also unseeded.

== Seeds ==
A champion seed is indicated in bold text while text in italics indicates the round in which that seed was eliminated.

1. (Switzerland) Marc Rosset (first round)
2. (Ukraine) Andrei Medvedev (second round)
3. (Austria) Thomas Muster (first round)
4. (Netherlands) Richard Krajicek (quarterfinals)
5. (Czech Republic) Petr Korda (first round)
6. (Netherlands) Jacco Eltingh (first round)
7. (Italy) Andrea Gaudenzi (semifinals)
8. (Czech Republic) Karel Nováček (second round)

== Draw ==
=== Key ===
- Q = Qualifier
- WC = Wild card
- LL = Lucky loser
- Alt = Alternate
- SE = Special exempt
- PR = Protected ranking
- ITF = ITF entry
- JE = Junior exempt
- w/o = Walkover
- r = Retired
- d = Defaulted
- SR = Special ranking

First round
1	(Switzerland) M Rosset	4	4
(Australia) **R Fromberg**	**6**	**6**
(United States) **A Krickstein**	4	**6**	**6**
Q	(Sweden) N Kulti	**6**	2	3
(Australia) **M Woodforde**	**6**	**6**
(Czech Republic) D Vacek	2	2
Q	(United States) L Gloria	**7^{7}**	4	6^{5}
8	(Czech Republic) **K Nováček**	6^{5}	**6**	**7^{7}**
3	(Austria) T Muster	2	4
WC	(Australia) **J Morgan**	**6**	**6**
WC	(Australia) **T Woodbridge**	**6**	**6**
(Germany) J Renzenbrink	3	2
Q	(Germany) L Burgsmüller	**7**	5	3
(Peru) **J Yzaga**	5	**7**	**6**
(Italy) **R Furlan**	2	**6**	**6**
5	(Czech Republic) P Korda	**6**	3	2
6	(Netherlands) J Eltingh	2	**7**	6^{1}
(France) **A Boetsch**	**6**	5	**7^{7}**
(United States) **P McEnroe**	6^{5}	**7^{9}**	**6**
(Germany) K Braasch	**7^{7}**	6^{7}	2
(France) **O Delaître**	**7^{7}**	**6**
(Slovakia) K Kučera	6^{4}	3
(Austria) H Skoff	3	1
4	(Netherlands) **R Krajicek**	**6**	**6**
7	(Italy) **A Gaudenzi**	**6**	**6**
(United States) D Wheaton	3	2
(France) **L Roux**	**7^{7}**	**6**
Q	(Mexico) I Martínez	6^{3}	4
WC	(Australia) **M Tebbutt**	**7^{7}**	6^{4}	**7**
Q	(United States) J Palmer	6^{3}	**7^{7}**	5
(United States) R Reneberg	4	3
2	(Netherlands) **A Medvedev**	**6**	**6**

Second round
(Australia) **R Fromberg**	**6**	**6**
(United States) A Krickstein	3	3
(Australia) **M Woodforde**	**6**	**6**
8	(Czech Republic) K Nováček	3	4
WC	(Australia) **J Morgan**	4	**6**	**7**
WC	(Australia) T Woodbridge	**6**	4	5
(Peru) J Yzaga	5	**7**	5
(Italy) **R Furlan**	**7**	5	**7**
(France) A Boetsch	6^{5}	**6**	2
(United States) **P McEnroe**	**7^{7}**	3	**6**
(France) O Delaître	3	6^{4}
4	(Netherlands) **R Krajicek**	**6**	**7^{7}**
7	(Italy) **A Gaudenzi**	**6**	**6**
(France) L Roux	0	4
WC	(Australia) **M Tebbutt**	5	**6**	**6**
2	(Ukraine) A Medvedev	**7**	1	2

Quarterfinals
(Australia) **R Fromberg**	**7^{8}**	**6**
(Australia) M Woodforde	6^{6}	3
WC	(Australia) J Morgan	4	6^{5}
(Italy) **R Furlan**	**6**	**7^{7}**
(United States) **P McEnroe**	**7**	**6**
4	(Netherlands) R Krajicek	5	1
7	(Italy) **A Gaudenzi**	**6**	**6**
WC	(Australia) M Tebbutt	4	4

Semifinals
(Australia) **R Fromberg**	**6**	**6**
(Italy) R Furlan	4	3
(United States) **P McEnroe**	**6**	**6**
7	(Italy) A Gaudenzi	3	4

Final
(Australia) R Fromberg	2	6^{4}
(United States) **P McEnroe**	**6**	**7^{7}**
