= 1995 Peters International – Women's doubles =

Women's doubles
- 1995 Peters International
- 1994 Champions: (United States) Patty Fendick (United States) Meredith McGrath

Final
- Champions: (United States) Lindsay Davenport (Czech Republic) Jana Novotná
- Runners-up: (United States) Patty Fendick (United States) Mary Joe Fernández
- Score: 7–5, 2–6, 6–4

Details
- Draw: 16
- Seeds: 4

Events
Singles	men	women
Doubles	men	women
← 1994 ·	Sydney International	· 1996 →

Patty Fendick and Meredith McGrath were the defending champions but they competed with different partners that year, Fendick with Mary Joe Fernández and McGrath with Rennae Stubbs.

McGrath and Stubbs lost in the first round to Nicole Bradtke and Kristine Radford.

Fendick and Fernández lost in the final 7–5, 2–6, 6–4 against Lindsay Davenport and Jana Novotná.

== Seeds ==
Champion seeds are indicated in bold text while text in italics indicates the round in which those seeds were eliminated.

1. (United States) **Lindsay Davenport** / (Czech Republic) **Jana Novotná (champions)**
2. (United States) Meredith McGrath / (Australia) Rennae Stubbs (first round)
3. (Germany) Barbara Rittner / (United States) Marianne Werdel (first round)
4. (United States) Patty Fendick / (United States) Mary Joe Fernández (final)

== Draw ==
=== Key ===
- Q = Qualifier
- WC = Wild card
- LL = Lucky loser
- Alt = Alternate
- SE = Special exempt
- PR = Protected ranking
- ITF = ITF entry
- JE = Junior exempt
- w/o = Walkover
- r = Retired
- d = Defaulted
- SR = Special ranking

First round
1	(United States) **L Davenport** (Czech Republic) **J Novotná**	**6**	**7**
(Argentina) G Sabatini (Netherlands) B Schultz	4	5
(Ukraine) **O Lugina** (Bulgaria) **E Pampoulova**	**6**	**7**
(United States) D Graham (United States) S Stafford	1	6
3	(Germany) B Rittner (United States) M Werdel	6	3
(Italy) **L Golarsa** (Russia) **E Maniokova**	**7**	**6**
(Australia) **C Barclay** (Australia) **J Byrne**	1	**6**	**6**
(South Africa) A Coetzer (Argentina) P Tarabini	**6**	3	3
WC	(Australia) T Musgrave (Australia) J Taylor	4	3
(Canada) **J Hetherington** (Netherlands) **C Vis**	**6**	**6**
Q	(Australia) S Peters (Australia) K Sharpe	3	2
4	(United States) **P Fendick** (United States) **M J Fernández**	**6**	**6**
(Germany) **A Huber** (Ukraine) **N Medvedeva**	**6**	**6**
(Belgium) S Appelmans (Netherlands) M Oremans	1	2
(Australia) **N Bradtke** (Australia) **K Radford**	**6**	**6**
2	(United States) M McGrath (Australia) R Stubbs	4	3

Quarterfinals
1	(United States) **L Davenport** (Czech Republic) **J Novotná**	**7**	**6**
(Ukraine) O Lugina (Bulgaria) E Pampoulova	6	1
(Italy) **L Golarsa** (Russia) **E Maniokova**	**6**	4	**6**
(Australia) C Barclay (Australia) J Byrne	4	**6**	4
(Canada) J Hetherington (Netherlands) C Vis	3	2
4	(United States) **P Fendick** (United States) **M J Fernández**	**6**	**6**
(Germany) **A Huber** (Ukraine) **N Medvedeva**	**6**	**6**
(Australia) N Bradtke (Australia) K Radford	0	3

Semifinals
1	(United States) **L Davenport** (Czech Republic) **J Novotná**	3	**7**	**6**
(Italy) L Golarsa (Russia) E Maniokova	**6**	5	3
4	(United States) **P Fendick** (United States) **M J Fernández**	**w/o**
(Germany) A Huber (Ukraine) N Medvedeva

Final
1	(United States) **Lindsay Davenport** (Czech Republic) **Jana Novotná**	**7**	2	**6**
4	(United States) Patty Fendick (United States) Mary Joe Fernández	5	**6**	4
