= 1998 Sydney International – Women's singles =

Women's singles
- 1998 Sydney International
- 1997 Champion: (Switzerland) Martina Hingis

Final
- Champion: (Spain) Arantxa Sánchez-Vicario
- Runner-up: (United States) Venus Williams
- Score: 6–1, 6–3

Details
- Draw: 28
- Seeds: 8

Events
Singles	men	women
Doubles	men	women
← 1997 ·	Sydney International	· 1999 →

Martina Hingis was the defending champion but lost in the second round to Venus Williams.

Arantxa Sánchez-Vicario won in the final 6–1, 6–3 against Williams.

== Seeds ==
A champion seed is indicated in bold text while text in italics indicates the round in which that seed was eliminated. The top four seeds received a bye to the second round.

1. (Switzerland) Martina Hingis (second round)
2. (United States) Lindsay Davenport (quarterfinals)
3. (South Africa) Amanda Coetzer (second round)
4. (Romania) Irina Spîrlea (second round)
5. (Spain) **Arantxa Sánchez-Vicario (champion)**
6. (Spain) Conchita Martínez (second round)
7. (France) Sandrine Testud (second round)
8. (Germany) Anke Huber (first round)

== Draw ==
=== Key ===
- Q = Qualifier
- WC = Wild card
- LL = Lucky loser
- Alt = Alternate
- SE = Special exempt
- PR = Protected ranking
- ITF = ITF entry
- JE = Junior exempt
- w/o = Walkover
- r = Retired
- d = Defaulted
- SR = Special ranking

=== Final ===
Final
	(United States) Venus Williams	1	3
5	(Spain) **Arantxa Sánchez-Vicario**	**6**	**6**

=== Section 1 ===
First round
(United States) **V Williams**	**6**
(Romania) R Dragomir	4	r
(Bulgaria) **M Maleeva**	**6**	1	**6**
(Belgium) S Appelmans	1	**6**	3
(United States) **C Rubin**	**6**	**6**
8	(Germany) A Huber	2	3
(Austria) **B Paulus**	**6**	**6**
(Netherlands) M Oremans	0	2
(Japan) **A Sugiyama**	**6**	**7**
LL	(Italy) F Lubiani	1	6
Q	(Spain) G León García	2	3
6	(Spain) **C Martínez**	**6**	**6**

Second round
1	(Switzerland) M Hingis	**6**	4	5
(United States) **V Williams**	3	**6**	**7**
(Bulgaria) **M Maleeva**	**6**	1	**6**
(United States) C Rubin	3	**6**	4
4	(Romania) I Spîrlea	2	**6**	3
(Austria) **B Paulus**	**6**	1	**6**
(Japan) **A Sugiyama**	**7**	**6**
6	(Spain) C Martínez	6	3

Quarterfinals
(United States) **V Williams**	**6**	**6**
(Bulgaria) M Maleeva	2	2
(Austria) B Paulus	1	6
(Japan) **A Sugiyama**	**6**	**7**

Semifinals
(United States) **V Williams**	**6**	**7**
(Japan) A Sugiyama	1	6

=== Section 2 ===
First round
5	(Spain) **A Sánchez-Vicario**	**7**	**6**
(Slovakia) K Habšudová	5	4
Q	(Chinese Taipei) **J Lee**	**6**	**1**
(Netherlands) B Schultz-McCarthy	0	1	r
WC	(Australia) R McQuillan	2	5
(Belarus) **N Zvereva**	**6**	**7**
7	(France) **S Testud**	**6**	**6**
WC	(Australia) K-A Guse	1	2
Q	(United States) **S Williams**	3	**6**	**7**
Q	(Croatia) M Lučić	**6**	4	5
(Indonesia) Y Basuki	4	0	r
(Russia) **A Kournikova**	**6**	**3**

Second round
5	(Spain) **A Sánchez-Vicario**	**6**	3	**6**
Q	(Chinese Taipei) J Lee	2	**6**	3
(Belarus) **N Zvereva**	6	**6**	**7**
3	(South Africa) A Coetzer	**7**	3	5
7	(France) S Testud	6	0	r
Q	(United States) **S Williams**	**7**	**3**
(Russia) A Kournikova	2	**7**	3
2	(United States) **L Davenport**	**6**	6	**6**

Quarterfinals
5	(Spain) **A Sánchez-Vicario**	**6**	**6**
(Belarus) N Zvereva	1	2
Q	(United States) **S Williams**	1	**7**	**7**
2	(United States) L Davenport	**6**	5	5

Semifinals
5	(Spain) **A Sánchez-Vicario**	**6**	**6**
Q	(United States) S Williams	2	1
