= 1998 Sydney International =

- Date: 11–17 January
- Edition: 106th
- Surface: Hard / outdoor
- Location: Sydney, Australia
- Venue: White City Stadium

Champions

Men's singles
- (Slovakia) Karol Kučera

Women's singles
- (Spain) Arantxa Sánchez-Vicario

Men's doubles
- (Australia) Todd Woodbridge / (Australia) Mark Woodforde

Women's doubles
- (Switzerland) Martina Hingis / (Czech Republic) Helena Suková
- Sydney International

The 1998 Sydney International was a tennis tournament played on outdoor hard courts at the White City Stadium in Sydney, Australia that was part of the International Series of the 1998 ATP Tour and of Tier II of the 1998 WTA Tour. The tournament was held from 11 through 17 January 1998.

== Finals ==
=== Men's singles ===
(Slovakia) Karol Kučera defeated (United Kingdom) Tim Henman, 7–5, 6–4.

- It was Kučera's 1st title of the year and the 3rd of his career.

=== Women's singles ===
(Spain) Arantxa Sánchez-Vicario defeated (United States) Venus Williams, 6–1, 6–3.

- It was Sánchez-Vicario's 1st title of the year and the 81st of her career.

=== Men's doubles ===
(Australia) Todd Woodbridge / (Australia) Mark Woodforde defeated (Netherlands) Jacco Eltingh / (Canada) Daniel Nestor, 6–3, 7–5.

- It was Woodbridge's 1st title of the year and the 54th of his career. It was Woodforde's 1st title of the year and the 57th of his career.

=== Women's doubles ===
(Switzerland) Martina Hingis / (Czech Republic) Helena Suková defeated (United States) Katrina Adams / (United States) Meredith McGrath, 6–1, 6–2.

- It was Hingis' 1st title of the year and the 27th of her career. It was Suková's only title of the year and the 83rd of her career.
