= 1995 Peters International – Women's singles =

Women's singles
- 1995 Peters International
- 1994 Champion: (Japan) Kimiko Date

Final
- Champion: (Argentina) Gabriela Sabatini
- Runner-up: (United States) Lindsay Davenport
- Score: 6–3, 6–4

Details
- Draw: 28
- Seeds: 8

Events
Singles	men	women
Doubles	men	women
← 1994 ·	Sydney International	· 1996 →

Kimiko Date was the defending champion but lost in the semifinals to Lindsay Davenport.

Gabriela Sabatini won in the final 6–3, 6–4 against Davenport.

== Seeds ==
A champion seed is indicated in bold text while text in italics indicates the round in which that seed was eliminated. The top four seeds received a bye to the second round.

1. (United States) Lindsay Davenport (final)
2. (Argentina) **Gabriela Sabatini (champion)**
3. (Japan) Kimiko Date (semifinals)
4. (United States) Mary Joe Fernández (semifinals)
5. (Netherlands) Brenda Schultz (second round)
6. (United States) Amy Frazier (second round)
7. (South Africa) Amanda Coetzer (first round)
8. n/a

== Draw ==
=== Key ===
- Q = Qualifier
- WC = Wild card
- LL = Lucky loser
- Alt = Alternate
- SE = Special exempt
- PR = Protected ranking
- ITF = ITF entry
- JE = Junior exempt
- w/o = Walkover
- r = Retired
- d = Defaulted
- SR = Special ranking

=== Final ===
Final
1	(United States) Lindsay Davenport	3	4
2	(Argentina) **Gabriela Sabatini**	**6**	**6**

=== Section 1 ===
First round
WC	(Switzerland) **M Hingis**	3	**6**	**6**
(United States) M McGrath	**6**	2	4
(Germany) **B Rittner**	**7**	**6**
(Ukraine) N Medvedeva	5	1
Q	(Germany) P Begerow	2	r
LL	(Czech Republic) **L Richterová**	**1**
(Japan) **M Endo**	**6**	**6**
(Australia) K Radford	1	1
(Netherlands) **M Oremans**	**6**	**6**
(United States) P Shriver	3	3
(Belgium) S Appelmans	1	5
6	(United States) **A Frazier**	**6**	**7**

Second round
1	(United States) **L Davenport**	**6**	3	**6**
WC	(Switzerland) M Hingis	1	**6**	3
(Germany) B Rittner	3	3
LL	(Czech Republic) **L Richterová**	**6**	**6**
3	(Japan) **K Date**	**6**	**6**
(Japan) M Endo	4	1
(Netherlands) **M Oremans**	**6**	**6**
6	(United States) A Frazier	4	3

Quarterfinals
1	(United States) **L Davenport**	**6**	**6**
LL	(Czech Republic) L Richterová	1	3
3	(Japan) **K Date**	4	**6**	**6**
(Netherlands) M Oremans	**6**	2	3

Semifinals
1	(United States) **L Davenport**	**6**	**4**
3	(Japan) K Date	4	1	r

=== Section 2 ===
First round
5	(Netherlands) **B Schultz**	6	**6**	**6**
(United States) A Grossman	**7**	2	1
WC	(Australia) **N Bradtke**	**6**	6	**7**
(United States) M Werdel	2	**7**	6
(United States) **S Stafford**	**7**	**6**
Q	(United Kingdom) C Wood	5	4
7	(South Africa) A Coetzer	**7**	2	5
Q	(Mexico) **A Gavaldón**	5	**6**	**7**
(Argentina) F Labat	3	3
(United States) **P Fendick**	**6**	**6**
Q	(United States) D Graham	6	4
(Japan) **N Sawamatsu**	**7**	**6**

Second round
5	(Netherlands) B Schultz	0	6
WC	(Australia) **N Bradtke**	**6**	**7**
(United States) S Stafford	3	2
4	(United States) **M J Fernández**	**6**	**6**
Q	(Mexico) A Gavaldón	2	3
(United States) **P Fendick**	**6**	**6**
(Japan) N Sawamatsu	2	3
2	(Argentina) **G Sabatini**	**6**	**6**

Quarterfinals
WC	(Australia) N Bradtke	2	**6**	5
4	(United States) **M J Fernández**	**6**	4	**7**
(United States) P Fendick	**6**	3	1
2	(Argentina) **G Sabatini**	1	**6**	**6**

Semifinals
4	(United States) M J Fernández	1	4
2	(Argentina) **G Sabatini**	**6**	**6**
