= 1995 Peters International =

- Date: 9–15 January
- Edition: 103rd
- Category: World Series (men); Tier II (women)
- Surface: Hard / outdoor
- Location: Sydney, Australia
- Venue: White City Stadium

Champions

Men's singles
- (United States) Patrick McEnroe

Women's singles
- (Argentina) Gabriela Sabatini

Men's doubles
- (Australia) Todd Woodbridge / (Australia) Mark Woodforde

Women's doubles
- (United States) Lindsay Davenport / (Czech Republic) Jana Novotná
- Sydney International

The 1995 Peters International was a tennis tournament played on outdoor hard courts at the White City Stadium in Sydney in Australia that was part of the World Series of the 1995 ATP Tour and of Tier II of the 1995 WTA Tour. It was the 103rd edition of the tournament and was held from 9 through 15 January 1995. Patrick McEnroe and Gabriela Sabatini won the singles titles.

== Finals ==
=== Men's singles ===
(United States) Patrick McEnroe defeated (Australia) Richard Fromberg 6–2, 7–6^{(7–4)}

- It was McEnroe's 1st title of the year and the 15th of his career.

=== Women's singles ===
(Argentina) Gabriela Sabatini defeated (United States) Lindsay Davenport 6–3, 6–4

- It was Sabatini's 1st title of the year and the 37th of her career.

=== Men's doubles ===
(Australia) Todd Woodbridge / (Australia) Mark Woodforde defeated (United States) Trevor Kronemann / (Australia) David Macpherson 7–6, 6–4

- It was Woodbridge's 1st title of the year and the 28th of his career. It was Woodforde's 1st title of the year and the 33rd of his career.

=== Women's doubles ===
(United States) Lindsay Davenport / (Czech Republic) Jana Novotná defeated (United States) Patty Fendick / (United States) Mary Joe Fernández 7–5, 2–6, 6–4

- It was Davenport's 1st title of the year and the 6th of her career. It was Novotná's 1st title of the year and the 64th of her career.
