= 1999 Sydney International – Women's doubles =

Women's doubles
- 1999 Sydney International

Final
- Champions: (Russia) Elena Likhovtseva (Japan) Ai Sugiyama
- Runners-up: (United States) Mary Joe Fernández (Germany) Anke Huber
- Score: 6–3, 2–6, 6–0

Events
Singles	men	women
Doubles	men	women
← 1998 ·	Sydney International	· 2000 →

The 1999 Sydney International women's doubles was the doubles event of the fourteenth edition of the adidas International, a WTA Tier II tournament and the second most prestigious women's tennis tournament held in Australia. Martina Hingis and Helena Suková were the reigning champions but did not compete that year.

Elena Likhovtseva and Ai Sugiyama won in the final 6–3, 2–6, 6–0 against Mary Joe Fernández and Anke Huber.

== Seeds ==
1. (United States) Lisa Raymond / (Australia) Rennae Stubbs (first round)
2. (Russia) Elena Likhovtseva / (Japan) Ai Sugiyama (champions)
3. (Latvia) Larisa Neiland / (Spain) Arantxa Sánchez-Vicario (quarterfinals)
4. (South Africa) Amanda Coetzer / (Belarus) Natasha Zvereva (first round)

== Draw ==
=== Key ===
- Q = Qualifier
- WC = Wild card
- LL = Lucky loser
- Alt = Alternate
- ITF = ITF entry
- PR = Protected ranking
- SR = Special ranking
- SE = Special exempt
- JE = Junior exempt
- JR = Junior Accelerator Programme entrant
- CO = College Accelerator Programme entrant
- NG = Next Gen Accelerator Program entrant
- w/o = Walkover
- r = Retired
- d = Defaulted

First round
1	(United States) L Raymond (Australia) R Stubbs	2	6^{2}
(United States) M J Fernández (Germany) A Huber	6	7^{7}
(Austria) B Schett (Switzerland) P Schnyder	6^{6}	2
(United States) N Arendt (Netherlands) M Bollegraf	7^{8}	6
4	(South Africa) A Coetzer (Belarus) N Zvereva	5	5
(United States) S Williams (United States) V Williams	7	7
(Argentina) I Gorrochategui (Spain) C Martínez	w/o
(Romania) I Spîrlea (Netherlands) C Vis
(Italy) S Farina (Slovakia) K Habšudová	6	6
Q	(Canada) S Jeyaseelan (Chinese Taipei) J Lee	2	1
WC	(Australia) A Molik (Belgium) D Van Roost	4	2
3	(Latvia) L Neiland (Spain) A Sánchez Vicario	6	6
(Australia) K Kunce (Australia) R McQuillan	3	6	6
(United States) K Adams (United States) D Graham	6	3	4
(Australia) C Barclay (United States) L Wild	1	1
2	(Russia) E Likhovtseva (Japan) A Sugiyama	6	6

Quarterfinals
(United States) M J Fernández (Germany) A Huber	6	6
(United States) N Arendt (Netherlands) M Bollegraf	2	4
(United States) S Williams (United States) V Williams	6	6
(Argentina) I Gorrochategui (Spain) C Martínez	4	1
(Italy) S Farina (Slovakia) K Habšudová	6	6
3	(Latvia) L Neiland (Spain) A Sánchez Vicario	4	4
(Australia) K Kunce (Australia) R McQuillan	2	7^{8}	5
2	(Russia) E Likhovtseva (Japan) A Sugiyama	6	6^{6}	7

Semifinals
(United States) M J Fernández (Germany) A Huber	6^{4}	7	7
(United States) S Williams (United States) V Williams	7^{7}	5	5
(Italy) S Farina (Slovakia) K Habšudová	5	4
2	(Russia) E Likhovtseva (Japan) A Sugiyama	7	6

Final
(United States) M J Fernández (Germany) A Huber	3	6	0
2	(Russia) E Likhovtseva (Japan) A Sugiyama	6	2	6

== Qualifying ==
=== Seeds ===
1. (Canada) Sonya Jeyaseelan / (Chinese Taipei) Janet Lee (Qualifiers)
2. (Australia) Trudi Musgrave / (Australia) Bryanne Stewart (qualifying competition)

=== Qualifiers ===
1. (Canada) Sonya Jeyaseelan / (Chinese Taipei) Janet Lee

== Qualifying draw ==
=== Key ===
- Q = Qualifier
- WC = Wild card
- LL = Lucky loser
- Alt = Alternate
- ITF = ITF entry
- PR = Protected ranking
- SR = Special ranking
- SE = Special exempt
- JE = Junior exempt
- JR = Junior Accelerator Programme entrant
- CO = College Accelerator Programme entrant
- NG = Next Gen Accelerator Program entrant
- w/o = Walkover
- r = Retired
- d = Defaulted

First round
1	(Canada) Sonya Jeyaseelan (Chinese Taipei) Janet Lee
Bye
(Germany) Jana Kandarr (Spain) Magüi Serna
Bye
(Germany) Marketa Kochta (Romania) Raluca Sandu	8
(Italy) Alice Canepa (Argentina) Mariana Díaz Oliva	9
Bye
2	(Australia) Trudi Musgrave (Australia) Bryanne Stewart

Second round
1	(Canada) Sonya Jeyaseelan (Chinese Taipei) Janet Lee	8
(Germany) Jana Kandarr (Spain) Magüi Serna	4
(Italy) Alice Canepa (Argentina) Mariana Díaz Oliva	6
2	(Australia) Trudi Musgrave (Australia) Bryanne Stewart	8

Qualifying competition
1	(Canada) Sonya Jeyaseelan (Chinese Taipei) Janet Lee	8
2	(Australia) Trudi Musgrave (Australia) Bryanne Stewart	2
