= 1999 Sydney International – Men's singles =

Men's singles
- 1999 Sydney International

Final
- Champion: (United States) Todd Martin
- Runner-up: (Spain) Àlex Corretja
- Score: 6–3, 7–6^{(7–5)}

Details
- Draw: 32
- Seeds: 8

Events
Singles	men	women
Doubles	men	women
← 1998 ·	Sydney International	· 2000 →

Karol Kučera was the defending champion but lost to Àlex Corretja in the semifinals.

Todd Martin won the title, defeating Corretja 6–3, 7–6^{(7–5)} in the final.

== Seeds ==
1. (Spain) Àlex Corretja (final)
2. (Australia) Patrick Rafter (first round)
3. (Spain) Carlos Moyá (second round)
4. (Slovakia) Karol Kučera (semifinals)
5. (United Kingdom) Greg Rusedski (first round)
6. (Netherlands) Richard Krajicek (second round)
7. (Spain) Albert Costa (quarterfinals)
8. (United States) Todd Martin (champion)

== Draw ==
=== Key ===
- Q = Qualifier
- WC = Wild card
- LL = Lucky loser
- Alt = Alternate
- SE = Special exempt
- PR = Protected ranking
- ITF = ITF entry
- JE = Junior exempt
- w/o = Walkover
- r = Retired
- d = Defaulted
- SR = Special ranking

=== Finals ===
Semifinals
1	(Spain) Àlex Corretja	7	6
4	(Slovakia) Karol Kučera	5	4
(Austria) Thomas Muster	2	1
8	(United States) Todd Martin	6	6

Final
1	(Spain) Àlex Corretja	3	6^{5}
8	(United States) Todd Martin	6	7^{7}

=== Top half ===
First round
1	(Spain) A Corretja	4	6	6
Q	(Germany) H Dreekmann	6	3	3
(Czech Republic) B Ulihrach	4	0
(Switzerland) M Rosset	6	6
(United States) J-M Gambill	7^{9}	2	6
WC	(Australia) S Stolle	6^{7}	6	1
Q	(Netherlands) P Haarhuis	2	4
7	(Spain) A Costa	6	6
4	(Slovakia) K Kučera	6	7^{10}
(Spain) F Clavet	4	6^{8}
SE	(Australia) S Draper	4	6^{2}
(France) C Pioline	6	7^{7}
WC	(Australia) M Tebbutt	6	0	6^{5}
WC	(Australia) T Woodbridge	1	6	7^{7}
(Brazil) G Kuerten	1	6	6
5	(United Kingdom) G Rusedski	6	3	4

Second round
1	(Spain) A Corretja	4	6	7^{7}
(Switzerland) M Rosset	6	3	6^{2}
(United States) J-M Gambill	3	5
7	(Spain) A Costa	6	7
4	(Slovakia) K Kučera	6	6
(France) C Pioline	4	0
WC	(Australia) T Woodbridge	4	0
(Brazil) G Kuerten	6	6

Quarterfinals
1	(Spain) A Corretja	6	4	2
7	(Spain) A Costa	3	6	0^{r}
4	(Slovakia) K Kučera	3	6	6
(Brazil) G Kuerten	6	4	1

Semifinals
1	(Spain) A Corretja	7	6
4	(Slovakia) K Kučera	5	4

=== Bottom half ===
First round
6	(Netherlands) R Krajicek	6	4
Q	(France) J Golmard	4	0	r
(Australia) J Stoltenberg	6	6^{3}	7^{7}
(Spain) A Berasategui	1	7^{7}	6^{5}
(Sweden) J Björkman	5	7^{7}	3
(Austria) T Muster	7	6^{2}	6
(Sweden) T Johansson	3	6^{4}
3	(Spain) C Moyá	6	7^{7}
8	(United States) T Martin	6	6
(Morocco) H Arazi	1	3
(Argentina) M Puerta	6	6
(Netherlands) J Siemerink	2	4
(Germany) N Kiefer	5	6	6
Q	(Czech Republic) M Damm	7	3	2
SE	(Australia) L Hewitt	7^{7}	6
2	(Australia) P Rafter	6^{1}	1

Second round
6	(Netherlands) R Krajicek	3	4
(Australia) J Stoltenberg	6	6
(Austria) T Muster	7^{7}	7
3	(Spain) C Moyá	6^{4}	5
8	(United States) T Martin	7^{9}	6
(Argentina) M Puerta	6^{7}	4
(Germany) N Kiefer	4	2
SE	(Australia) L Hewitt	6	6

Quarterfinals
(Australia) J Stoltenberg	6	2	3
(Austria) T Muster	3	6	6
8	(United States) T Martin	6	6^{4}	6
SE	(Australia) L Hewitt	3	7^{7}	4

Semifinals
(Austria) T Muster	2	1
8	(United States) T Martin	6	6
