= 1997 Sydney International =

- Date: 6–12 January
- Edition: 105th
- Category: World Series (men); Tier II (women)
- Prize money: $303,000 (men) $342,400 (women)
- Surface: Hard / outdoor
- Location: Sydney, Australia
- Venue: White City Stadium

Champions

Men's singles
- (United Kingdom) Tim Henman

Women's singles
- (Switzerland) Martina Hingis

Men's doubles
- (Argentina) Luis Lobo / (Spain) Javier Sánchez

Women's doubles
- (United States) Gigi Fernández / (Spain) Arantxa Sánchez Vicario
- Sydney International

The 1997 Sydney International was a combined men's and women's tennis tournament played on outdoor hard courts at the White City Stadium in Sydney in Australia that was part of the World Series category of the 1997 ATP Tour and of Tier II category of the 1997 WTA Tour. It was the 105th edition of the tournament and was held from 6 January through 12 January 1997. Unseeded Tim Henman and second-seeded Martina Hingis won the singles title.

== Finals ==
=== Men's singles ===
(United Kingdom) Tim Henman defeated (Spain) Carlos Moyá 6–3, 6–1

- It was Henman's 1st singles title of the year and the 1st of his career.

=== Women's singles ===
(Switzerland) Martina Hingis defeated (United States) Jennifer Capriati 6–1, 5–7, 6–1

- It was Hingis' 1st singles title of the year and the 3rd of her career.

=== Men's doubles ===
(Argentina) Luis Lobo / (Spain) Javier Sánchez defeated (Netherlands) Paul Haarhuis / (Netherlands) Jan Siemerink 6–4, 6–7, 6–3

- It was Lobo's 1st title of the year and the 6th of his career. It was Sánchez's 1st title of the year and the 25th of his career.

=== Women's doubles ===
(United States) Gigi Fernández / (Spain) Arantxa Sánchez Vicario defeated (United States) Lindsay Davenport / (Belarus) Natasha Zvereva 6–3, 6–1

- It was Fernández's 1st title of the year and the 68th of her career. It was Sánchez Vicario's 1st title of the year and the 74th of her career.
