= 1996 Peters International – Women's singles =

Women's singles
- 1996 Peters International
- 1995 Champion: (Argentina) Gabriela Sabatini

Final
- Champion: (United States) Monica Seles
- Runner-up: (United States) Lindsay Davenport
- Score: 4–6, 7–6, 6–3

Details
- Draw: 28
- Seeds: 8

Events
Singles	men	women
Doubles	men	women
← 1995 ·	Sydney International	· 1997 →

Gabriela Sabatini was the defending champion but did not compete that year.

Monica Seles won in the final 4–6, 7–6, 6–3 against Lindsay Davenport.

== Seeds ==
A champion seed is indicated in bold text while text in italics indicates the round in which that seed was eliminated. The top four seeds received a bye to the second round.

1. (United States) **Monica Seles (champion)**
2. (Japan) Kimiko Date (semifinals)
3. (United States) Mary Joe Fernández (quarterfinals)
4. (United States) Lindsay Davenport (final)
5. (Netherlands) Brenda Schultz-McCarthy (semifinals)
6. (United States) Chanda Rubin (quarterfinals)
7. (United States) Amy Frazier (second round)
8. (Japan) Naoko Sawamatsu (second round)

== Draw ==
=== Key ===
- Q = Qualifier
- WC = Wild card
- LL = Lucky loser
- Alt = Alternate
- SE = Special exempt
- PR = Protected ranking
- ITF = ITF entry
- JE = Junior exempt
- w/o = Walkover
- r = Retired
- d = Defaulted
- SR = Special ranking

=== Final ===
Final
1	(United States) **Monica Seles**	4	**7**	**6**
4	(United States) Lindsay Davenport	**6**	6	3

=== Section 1 ===
First round
(Belgium) **D Van Roost**	**7**	**6**
Q	(Germany) V Martinek	6	3
(Belgium) S Appelmans	**7**	6	5/r
(South Africa) **M de Swardt**	6	**7**	**6**
(Mexico) A Gavaldón	5	5
7	(United States) **A Frazier**	**7**	**7**
(South Africa) **A Coetzer**	**6**	**6**
WC	(Australia) R Stubbs	2	0
Q	(Spain) M Sánchez Lorenzo	4	**6**	3
(United States) **L Raymond**	**6**	3	**6**
WC	(Australia) R McQuillan	**7**	3	4
5	(Netherlands) **B Schultz-McCarthy**	6	**6**	**6**

Second round
1	(United States) **M Seles**	**6**	**6**
(Belgium) D Van Roost	2	1
(South Africa) **M de Swardt**	**6**	**6**
7	(United States) A Frazier	3	2
3	(United States) **M J Fernández**	**6**	**6**
(South Africa) A Coetzer	4	2
(United States) L Raymond	4	**7**	3
5	(Netherlands) **B Schultz-McCarthy**	**6**	6	**6**

Quarterfinals
1	(United States) **M Seles**	**6**	**6**
(South Africa) M de Swardt	3	2
3	(United States) M J Fernández	6	3
5	(Netherlands) **B Schultz-McCarthy**	**7**	**6**

Semifinals
1	(United States) **M Seles**	**7**	**6**
5	(Netherlands) B Schultz-McCarthy	6	4

=== Section 2 ===
First round
8	(Japan) **N Sawamatsu**	**6**	2	**7**
(Switzerland) M Hingis	4	**6**	5
(Australia) **N Bradtke**	**6**	**6**
(Poland) K Nowak	1	1
(Czech Republic) H Suková	**6**	3	5
(Sweden) **Å Carlsson**	4	**6**	**7**
6	(United States) **C Rubin**	**6**	**6**
(United States) L McNeil	2	2
Q	(Federal Republic of Yugoslavia) **T Ječmenica**	4	**7**	**7**
(Netherlands) M Oremans	**6**	6	5
Q	(France) A Dechaume-Balleret	4	4
(Romania) **I Spîrlea**	**6**	**6**

Second round
8	(Japan) N Sawamatsu	4	2
(Australia) **N Bradtke**	**6**	**6**
(Sweden) Å Carlsson	2	2
4	(United States) **L Davenport**	**6**	**6**
6	(United States) **C Rubin**	**6**	**2**
Q	(Federal Republic of Yugoslavia) T Ječmenica	0	1	r
(Romania) I Spîrlea	4	3
2	(Japan) **K Date**	**6**	**6**

Quarterfinals
(Australia) N Bradtke	3	**7**	3
4	(United States) **L Davenport**	**6**	6	**6**
6	(United States) C Rubin	0	1
2	(Japan) **K Date**	**6**	**6**

Semifinals
4	(United States) **L Davenport**	**6**	4	**7**
2	(Japan) K Date	2	**6**	5
