= 1997 Sydney International – Men's singles =

Men's singles
- 1997 Sydney International

Final
- Champion: (United Kingdom) Tim Henman
- Runner-up: (Spain) Carlos Moyá
- Score: 6–3, 6–1

Details
- Draw: 32
- Seeds: 8

Events
Singles	men	women
Doubles	men	women
← 1996 ·	Sydney International	· 1998 →

Todd Martin was the defending champion but did not compete that year.

Tim Henman won in the final 6–3, 6–1 against Carlos Moyá.

== Seeds ==
A champion seed is indicated in bold text while text in italics indicates the round in which that seed was eliminated.

1. (Croatia) Goran Ivanišević (semifinals)
2. (South Africa) Wayne Ferreira (first round)
3. (Spain) Albert Costa (semifinals)
4. (Netherlands) Jan Siemerink (first round)
5. (Spain) Félix Mantilla (first round)
6. (Switzerland) Marc Rosset (first round)
7. (Czech Republic) Petr Korda (first round)
8. (Netherlands) Paul Haarhuis (second round)

== Draw ==
=== Key ===
- Q = Qualifier
- WC = Wild card
- LL = Lucky loser
- Alt = Alternate
- ITF = ITF entry
- PR = Protected ranking
- SR = Special ranking
- SE = Special exempt
- JE = Junior exempt
- JR = Junior Accelerator Programme entrant
- CO = College Accelerator Programme entrant
- NG = Next Gen Accelerator Program entrant
- w/o = Walkover
- r = Retired
- d = Defaulted

First round
1	(Croatia) **G Ivanišević**	**6**	**6**
(Germany) M-K Goellner	3	4
(Morocco) H Arazi	**6**	4	3
(Spain) **J Sánchez**	3	**6**	**6**
WC	(Australia) **S Stolle**	**6**	**6**
(Germany) D Prinosil	4	4
(Romania) **A Voinea**	**7^{8}**	**6**
7	(Czech Republic) P Korda	6^{6}	3
4	(Netherlands) J Siemerink	**6**	2	1
(Sweden) **M Tillström**	4	**6**	**6**
Q	(Australia) G Doyle	4	4
(United States) **A O'Brien**	**6**	**6**
(United Kingdom) **T Henman**	**6**	**6**
(Italy) R Furlan	4	4
(Spain) **S Bruguera**	**7^{7}**	**6**
5	(Spain) F Mantilla	6^{5}	3
6	(Switzerland) M Rosset	1	4
(Australia) **T Woodbridge**	**6**	**6**
Q	(Armenia) S Sargsian	2	1
(Zimbabwe) **B Black**	**6**	**6**
(Czech Republic) **B Ulihrach**	**6**	6^{6}	**6**
Q	(Czech Republic) C Doseděl	3	**7^{8}**	3
LL	(France) L Roux	4	2
3	(Spain) **A Costa**	**6**	**6**
8	(Netherlands) **P Haarhuis**	**6**	**7^{7}**
(Australia) M Woodforde	2	6^{0}
WC	(Australia) R Fromberg	**6**	3	6^{1}
WC	(Australia) **P Rafter**	2	**6**	**7^{7}**
LL	(South Africa) N Godwin	4	1
Q	(South Africa) **G Stafford**	**6**	**6**
(Spain) **C Moyá**	2	**6**	**6**
2	(South Africa) W Ferreira	**6**	0	3

Second round
1	(Croatia) **G Ivanišević**	**6**	0	**6**
(Spain) J Sánchez	4	**6**	4
WC	(Australia) **S Stolle**	**6**	**6**
(Romania) A Voinea	2	1
(Sweden) M Tillström	4	**7^{7}**	4
(United States) **A O'Brien**	**6**	6^{4}	**6**
(United Kingdom) **T Henman**	3	**6**	**6**
(Spain) S Bruguera	**6**	3	3
(Australia) T Woodbridge
(Zimbabwe) **B Black**	**w/o**
(Czech Republic) B Ulihrach	2	2
3	(Spain) **A Costa**	**6**	**6**
8	(Netherlands) P Haarhuis	**7^{7}**	5	6^{2}
WC	(Australia) **P Rafter**	6^{5}	**7**	**7^{7}**
Q	(South Africa) G Stafford	2	3
(Spain) **C Moyá**	**6**	**6**

Quarterfinals
1	(Croatia) **G Ivanišević**	**6**	**6**
WC	(Australia) S Stolle	4	2
(United States) A O'Brien	**6**	6^{3}	4
(United Kingdom) **T Henman**	1	**7^{7}**	**6**
(Zimbabwe) B Black	4	2
3	(Spain) **A Costa**	**6**	**6**
WC	(Australia) P Rafter	6^{6}	3
(Spain) **C Moyá**	**7^{8}**	**6**

Semifinals
1	(Croatia) G Ivanišević	**6**	6^{1}	1
(United Kingdom) **T Henman**	4	**7^{7}**	**6**
3	(Spain) A Costa	**6**	3	6^{6}
(Spain) **C Moyá**	3	**6**	**7^{8}**

Final
(United Kingdom) **Tim Henman**	**6**	**6**
(Spain) Carlos Moyá	3	1
