= 1997 Sydney International – Women's doubles =

Women's doubles
- 1997 Sydney International
- 1996 Champions: (United States) Lindsay Davenport (United States) Mary Joe Fernandez

Final
- Champions: (United States) Gigi Fernández (Spain) Arantxa Sánchez Vicario
- Runners-up: (United States) Lindsay Davenport (Belarus) Natasha Zvereva
- Score: 6–3, 6–1

Events
Singles	men	women
Doubles	men	women
← 1996 ·	Sydney International	· 1998 →

Lindsay Davenport and Mary Joe Fernandez were the defending champions but they competed with different partners that year, Davenport with Natasha Zvereva and Fernandez with Katrina Adams.

Adams and Fernandez lost in the quarterfinals to Sabine Appelmans and Miriam Oremans.

Davenport and Zvereva lost in the final 6–3, 6–1 against Gigi Fernández and Arantxa Sánchez Vicario.

== Seeds ==
Champion seeds are indicated in bold text while text in italics indicates the round in which those seeds were eliminated.

1. (United States) **Gigi Fernández** / (Spain) **Arantxa Sánchez Vicario (champions)**
2. (United States) Lindsay Davenport / (Belarus) Natasha Zvereva (final)
3. (United States) Nicole Arendt / (Netherlands) Manon Bollegraf (first round)
4. (United States) Katrina Adams / (United States) Mary Joe Fernandez (quarterfinals)

== Draw ==
=== Key ===
- Q = Qualifier
- WC = Wild card
- LL = Lucky loser
- Alt = Alternate
- SE = Special exempt
- PR = Protected ranking
- ITF = ITF entry
- JE = Junior exempt
- w/o = Walkover
- r = Retired
- d = Defaulted
- SR = Special ranking

First round
1	(United States) **G Fernández** (Spain) **A Sánchez Vicario**	**6**	**6**
(Romania) I Spîrlea (Argentina) P Tarabini	3	2
Q	(Romania) **C Cristea** (Federal Republic of Yugoslavia) **T Ječmenica**	**7^{7}**	**6**
(Italy) L Golarsa (Canada) R Simpson	6^{3}	2
4	(United States) **K Adams** (United States) **M J Fernandez**	5	**6**	**6**
(Japan) R Hiraki (Slovakia) J Husárová	**7**	1	1
(Belgium) **S Appelmans** (Netherlands) **M Oremans**	**6**	**6**
(France) A Dechaume-Balleret (France) S Testud	4	4
(Australia) N Bradtke (Australia) R McQuillan	4	**7**	3
LL	(United States) **A Grossman** (United States) **T Whitlinger-Jones**	**6**	5	**6**
(United States) **A Frazier** (United States) **K Po**	**6**	2	**6**
3	(United States) N Arendt (Netherlands) M Bollegraf	4	**6**	0
(United States) C Rubin (Netherlands) B Schultz-McCarthy	5	**6**	0
WC	(South Africa) **A Coetzer** (France) **M Pierce**	**7**	4	**6**
(Indonesia) Y Basuki (Netherlands) C Vis	3	5
2	(United States) **L Davenport** (Belarus) **N Zvereva**	**6**	**7**

Quarterfinals
1	(United States) **G Fernández** (Spain) **A Sánchez Vicario**	**6**	**6**
Q	(Romania) C Cristea (Federal Republic of Yugoslavia) T Ječmenica	4	0
4	(United States) K Adams (United States) M J Fernandez	5	**6**	1
(Belgium) **S Appelmans** (Netherlands) **M Oremans**	**7**	3	**6**
LL	(United States) A Grossman (United States) T Whitlinger-Jones	5	1
(United States) **A Frazier** (United States) **K Po**	**7**	**6**
WC	(South Africa) A Coetzer (France) M Pierce	2	1
2	(United States) **L Davenport** (Belarus) **N Zvereva**	**6**	**6**

Semifinals
1	(United States) **G Fernández** (Spain) **A Sánchez Vicario**	**7^{7}**	1	**6**
(Belgium) S Appelmans (Netherlands) M Oremans	6^{4}	**6**	3
(United States) A Frazier (United States) K Po	0	6^{5}
2	(United States) **L Davenport** (Belarus) **N Zvereva**	**6**	**7^{7}**

Final
1	(United States) **Gigi Fernández** (Spain) **Arantxa Sánchez Vicario**	**6**	**6**
2	(United States) Lindsay Davenport (Belarus) Natasha Zvereva	3	1
