= 1999 Sydney International – Women's singles =

Women's singles
- 1999 Sydney International

Final
- Champion: (United States) Lindsay Davenport
- Runner-up: (Switzerland) Martina Hingis
- Score: 6–4, 6–3

Details
- Draw: 28
- Seeds: 8

Events
Singles	men	women
Doubles	men	women
← 1998 ·	Sydney International	· 2000 →

The 1999 Sydney International women's singles, was the singles event of the fourteenth edition of the adidas International, a WTA Tier II tournament and the second most prestigious women's tennis tournament held in Australia. Arantxa Sánchez Vicario was the defending champion but lost in the quarterfinals to Barbara Schett.

Lindsay Davenport won in the final 6–4, 6–3 against Martina Hingis.

== Seeds ==
The top four seeds received a bye to the second round.

1. (United States) Lindsay Davenport (champion)
2. (Switzerland) Martina Hingis (final)
3. (Spain) Arantxa Sánchez Vicario (quarterfinals)
4. (United States) Venus Williams (quarterfinals)
5. (Spain) Conchita Martínez (second round)
6. (Germany) Steffi Graf (semifinals)
7. (Switzerland) Patty Schnyder (quarterfinals)
8. (Belgium) Dominique Van Roost (quarterfinals)

== Draw ==
=== Key ===
- Q = Qualifier
- WC = Wild card
- LL = Lucky loser
- Alt = Alternate
- ITF = ITF entry
- PR = Protected ranking
- SR = Special ranking
- SE = Special exempt
- JE = Junior exempt
- JR = Junior Accelerator Programme entrant
- CO = College Accelerator Programme entrant
- NG = Next Gen Accelerator Program entrant
- w/o = Walkover
- r = Retired
- d = Defaulted

=== Finals ===
Semifinals
1	(United States) Lindsay Davenport	6	7
6	(Germany) Steffi Graf	2	5
(Austria) Barbara Schett	3	6	6^{5}
2	(Switzerland) Martina Hingis	6	3	7^{7}

Final
1	(United States) Lindsay Davenport	6	6
2	(Switzerland) Martina Hingis	4	3

=== Top half ===
First round
(Spain) M Serna	7^{7}	2	1
(United States) MJ Fernández	6^{1}	6	6
(Russia) E Likhovtseva	5	1
Q	(Slovakia) K Habšudová	7	6
(France) S Testud	3	6	2
7	(Switzerland) P Schnyder	6	3	6
(Croatia) M Lučić	4	6	0
(South Africa) A Coetzer	6	3	6
(United States) S Williams	6	6
Q	(Argentina) I Gorrochategui	4	2
(Japan) A Sugiyama	0	4
6	(Germany) S Graf	6	6

Second round
1	(United States) L Davenport	6	7^{8}
(United States) MJ Fernández	4	6^{6}
Q	(Slovakia) K Habšudová	4	6	4
7	(Switzerland) P Schnyder	6	4	6
4	(United States) V Williams	7^{7}	6
(South Africa) A Coetzer	6^{5}	2
(United States) S Williams	2	6	5
6	(Germany) S Graf	6	3	7

Quarterfinals
1	(United States) L Davenport	6	6
7	(Switzerland) P Schnyder	2	3
4	(United States) V Williams	6	2	4
6	(Germany) S Graf	4	6	6

Semifinals
1	(United States) L Davenport	6	7
6	(Germany) S Graf	2	5

=== Bottom half ===
First round
5	(Spain) C Martínez	6	6
WC	(Australia) R McQuillan	0	3
(Austria) B Schett	6	7^{7}
Q	(France) A Mauresmo	1	6^{1}
(Germany) A Huber	6	6
Q	(Russia) T Panova	2	1
8	(Belgium) D Van Roost	6
(Romania) I Spîrlea	1^{r}
(Russia) A Kournikova	4	6	7
(Italy) S Farina	6	3	5
(Belarus) N Zvereva	3	4
WC	(Australia) A Molik	6	6

Second round
5	(Spain) C Martínez	3	6^{7}
(Austria) B Schett	6	7^{9}
(Germany) A Huber	6	3	2
3	(Spain) A Sánchez Vicario	2	6	6
8	(Belgium) D Van Roost	6	6
(Russia) A Kournikova	1	2
WC	(Australia) A Molik	1	2
2	(Switzerland) M Hingis	6	6

Quarterfinals
(Austria) B Schett	1	6	6
3	(Spain) A Sánchez Vicario	6	1	0
8	(Belgium) D Van Roost	2	0
2	(Switzerland) M Hingis	6	6

Semifinals
(Austria) B Schett	3	6	6^{5}
2	(Switzerland) M Hingis	6	3	7^{7}

== Qualifying ==
=== Seeds ===
1. (United States) Lisa Raymond (second round)
2. (Slovakia) Henrieta Nagyová (first round)
3. (France) Amélie Mauresmo (Qualifier)
4. (United States) Tara Snyder (first round, retired)
5. (Austria) Sylvia Plischke (second round)
6. (Czech Republic) Adriana Gerši (second round)
7. (United States) Meghann Shaughnessy (second round)
8. (Slovakia) Karina Habšudová (Qualifier)

=== Qualifiers ===
1. (Slovakia) Karina Habšudová
2. (France) Amélie Mauresmo
3. (Russia) Tatiana Panova
4. (Argentina) Inés Gorrochategui

== Qualifying draw ==
=== Key ===
- Q = Qualifier
- WC = Wild card
- LL = Lucky loser
- Alt = Alternate
- ITF = ITF entry
- PR = Protected ranking
- SR = Special ranking
- SE = Special exempt
- JE = Junior exempt
- JR = Junior Accelerator Programme entrant
- CO = College Accelerator Programme entrant
- NG = Next Gen Accelerator Program entrant
- w/o = Walkover
- r = Retired
- d = Defaulted

=== First qualifier ===
First round
1	(United States) Lisa Raymond	6	6
Alt	(United States) Debbie Graham	2	4
(Romania) Raluca Sandu	6	7
WC	(Australia) Catherine Barclay	2	5
(Spain) Cristina Torrens Valero	4	1
(Japan) Miho Saeki	6	6
(Germany) Jana Kandarr	2	1
8	(Slovakia) Karina Habšudová	6	6

Second round
1	(United States) Lisa Raymond	6^{4}	6^{7}
(Romania) Raluca Sandu	7^{7}	7^{9}
(Japan) Miho Saeki	6	4	5
8	(Slovakia) Karina Habšudová	2	6	7

Qualifying competition
(Romania) Raluca Sandu	6	1	1
8	(Slovakia) Karina Habšudová	4	6	6

=== Second qualifier ===
First round
3	(France) Amélie Mauresmo	6	6
(Argentina) Mariana Díaz Oliva	4	2
WC	(Australia) Bryanne Stewart	4	1
(United States) Jane Chi	6	6
WC	(Australia) Rennae Stubbs	4	5
WC	(Australia) Evie Dominikovic	6	7
(Chinese Taipei) Janet Lee	3	1
5	(Austria) Sylvia Plischke	6	6

Second round
3	(France) Amélie Mauresmo	6	6
(United States) Jane Chi	3	3
WC	(Australia) Evie Dominikovic	6	7^{7}
5	(Austria) Sylvia Plischke	4	6^{5}

Qualifying competition
3	(France) Amélie Mauresmo	6	6
WC	(Australia) Evie Dominikovic	1	4

=== Third qualifier ===
First round
7	(United States) Meghann Shaughnessy	6	6
(Canada) Sonya Jeyaseelan	4	4
Alt	(Australia) Trudi Musgrave	6	6^{3}	1
(Russia) Tatiana Panova	3	7^{7}	6
(Slovakia) Katarína Studeníková	3	2
(Luxembourg) Anne Kremer	6	7
(Germany) Andrea Glass	6	5
4	(United States) Tara Snyder	2	2^{r}

Second round
7	(United States) Meghann Shaughnessy	6	4	1
(Russia) Tatiana Panova	4	6	6
(Luxembourg) Anne Kremer	1	1
(Germany) Andrea Glass	6	6

Qualifying competition
(Russia) Tatiana Panova	6	6
(Germany) Andrea Glass	3	3

=== Fourth qualifier ===
First round
6	(Czech Republic) Adriana Gerši	7^{7}	6
Alt	(Germany) Marketa Kochta	6^{4}	0
(Argentina) Inés Gorrochategui	6	6
(Czech Republic) Radka Bobková	1	4
(Croatia) Silvija Talaja	6	6
(Italy) Laura Golarsa	1	0
(United States) Jennifer Capriati	7^{7}	6
2	(Slovakia) Henrieta Nagyová	6^{4}	2

Second round
6	(Czech Republic) Adriana Gerši	6^{8}	2
(Argentina) Inés Gorrochategui	7^{10}	6
(Croatia) Silvija Talaja	2	6	6
(United States) Jennifer Capriati	6	3	3

Qualifying competition
(Argentina) Inés Gorrochategui	6	6
(Croatia) Silvija Talaja	1	4
