= 1998 Sydney International – Men's singles =

Men's singles
- 1998 Sydney International

Final
- Champion: (Slovakia) Karol Kučera
- Runner-up: (United Kingdom) Tim Henman
- Score: 7–5, 6–4

Details
- Draw: 32
- Seeds: 8

Events
Singles	men	women
Doubles	men	women
← 1997 ·	Sydney International	· 1999 →

Tim Henman was the defending champion, but lost in the final to Karol Kučera 7–5, 6–4.

== Seeds ==
1. (Australia) Patrick Rafter (semifinals)
2. (Sweden) Jonas Björkman (first round)
3. (Spain) Carlos Moyá (first round)
4. (Spain) Sergi Bruguera (first round)
5. (Spain) Àlex Corretja (first round)
6. (United Kingdom) Tim Henman (final)
7. (Spain) Albert Costa (quarterfinals)
8. (France) Cédric Pioline (first round)

== Draw ==
=== Key ===
- Q = Qualifier
- WC = Wild card
- LL = Lucky loser
- Alt = Alternate
- SE = Special exempt
- PR = Protected ranking
- ITF = ITF entry
- JE = Junior exempt
- w/o = Walkover
- r = Retired
- d = Defaulted
- SR = Special ranking

=== Finals ===
Semifinals
1	(Australia) Patrick Rafter	6^{5}	5
6	(United Kingdom) Tim Henman	7^{7}	7
(Slovakia) Karol Kučera	4	7^{8}	6
Q	(Australia) Michael Tebbutt	6	6^{6}	0

Final
6	(United Kingdom) Tim Henman	5	4
(Slovakia) Karol Kučera	7	6

=== Top half ===
First round
1	(Australia) P Rafter	6	6
(Australia) T Woodbridge	4	3
(Spain) A Berasategui	6	6^{6}	6
(France) F Santoro	4	7^{8}	3
(Sweden) T Johansson	3	5
(Spain) F Clavet	6	7
(United States) T Martin	6	5	6
8	(France) C Pioline	4	7	3
3	(Spain) C Moyá	7^{8}	4	4
(Sweden) T Enqvist	6^{6}	6	6
Q	(Armenia) S Sargsian	6^{6}	6	1
WC	(Australia) S Draper	7^{8}	3	6
(Spain) A Portas	6	6
(Sweden) M Norman	3	3
WC	(Australia) M Woodforde	2	6	4
6	(United Kingdom) T Henman	6	3	6

Second round
1	(Australia) P Rafter	6	6
(Spain) A Berasategui	3	4
(Spain) F Clavet	6	1	6^{3}
(United States) T Martin	3	6	7^{7}
(Sweden) T Enqvist	4	6	6
WC	(Australia) S Draper	6	4	2
(Spain) A Portas	6^{5}	4
6	(United Kingdom) T Henman	7^{7}	6

Quarterfinals
1	(Australia) P Rafter	6	6^{4}	6
(United States) T Martin	4	7^{7}	1
(Sweden) T Enqvist	6	5	4
6	(United Kingdom) T Henman	3	7	6

Semifinals
1	(Australia) P Rafter	6^{5}	5
6	(United Kingdom) T Henman	7^{7}	7

=== Bottom half ===
First round
5	(Spain) À Corretja	2	4
Q	(Germany) H Dreekmann	6	6
(Spain) J Alonso	3	2
SE	(Australia) J Stoltenberg	6	6
(Slovakia) K Kučera	6	6
SE	(Netherlands) S Schalken	2	2
(Germany) N Kiefer	7	6
4	(Spain) S Bruguera	5	1
7	(Spain) A Costa	6	6
(Morocco) H Arazi	3	4
(Sweden) M Gustafsson	7^{7}	6
Q	(Belgium) D Norman	6^{5}	3
Q	(Australia) M Tebbutt	4	6	7
(Switzerland) M Rosset	6	4	5
WC	(Australia) L Hewitt	6	6^{4}	6
2	(Sweden) J Björkman	3	7^{7}	4

Second round
Q	(Germany) H Dreekmann	6^{5}	5
SE	(Australia) J Stoltenberg	7^{7}	7
(Slovakia) K Kučera	5
(Germany) N Kiefer	2^{r}
7	(Spain) A Costa	3	6	6
(Sweden) M Gustafsson	6	4	3
Q	(Australia) M Tebbutt	5	6	7
WC	(Australia) L Hewitt	7	3	5

Quarterfinals
SE	(Australia) J Stoltenberg	3	6	4
(Slovakia) K Kučera	6	2	6
7	(Spain) A Costa	3	3
Q	(Australia) M Tebbutt	6	6

Semifinals
(Slovakia) K Kučera	4	7^{8}	6
Q	(Australia) M Tebbutt	6	6^{6}	0
