= 1997 Sydney International – Men's doubles =

Men's doubles
- 1997 Sydney International
- 1996 Champions: (South Africa) Ellis Ferreira (Netherlands) Jan Siemerink

Final
- Champions: (Argentina) Luis Lobo (Spain) Javier Sánchez
- Runners-up: (Netherlands) Paul Haarhuis (Netherlands) Jan Siemerink
- Score: 6–4, 6–7, 6–3

Events
Singles	men	women
Doubles	men	women
← 1996 ·	Sydney International	· 1998 →

Ellis Ferreira and Jan Siemerink were the defending champions but only Siemerink competed that year with Paul Haarhuis.

Haarhuis and Siemerink lost in the final 6–4, 6–7, 6–3 against Luis Lobo and Javier Sánchez.

== Seeds ==
Champion seeds are indicated in bold text while text in italics indicates the round in which those seeds were eliminated.

1. n/a
2. (Netherlands) Paul Haarhuis / (Netherlands) Jan Siemerink (final)
3. (Canada) Sébastien Lareau / (United States) Alex O'Brien (first round)
4. (Belgium) Libor Pimek / (South Africa) Byron Talbot (semifinals)

== Draw ==
=== Key ===
- Q = Qualifier
- WC = Wild card
- LL = Lucky loser
- Alt = Alternate
- SE = Special exempt
- PR = Protected ranking
- ITF = ITF entry
- JE = Junior exempt
- w/o = Walkover
- r = Retired
- d = Defaulted
- SR = Special ranking

First round
LL	(South Africa) **N Godwin** (South Africa) **G Stafford**	4	**7**	**6**
(Canada) G Connell (United States) S Davis	**6**	6	4
WC	(Australia) **P Cash** (Australia) **S Stolle**	**6**	6	**6**
(Germany) M-K Goellner (Germany) D Prinosil	1	**7**	2
3	(Canada) S Lareau (United States) A O'Brien	6	**6**	4
(Australia) **J Eagle** (Australia) **A Florent**	**7**	0	**6**
(Australia) A Kratzmann (Australia) M Tebbutt	6	5
(Argentina) **L Lobo** (Spain) **J Sánchez**	**7**	**7**
WC	(Australia) **G Doyle** (Australia) **P Tramacchi**	**7**	2	**6**
WC	(United States) L Jensen (United States) M Jensen	6	**6**	4
(Italy) C Brandi (United States) K Kinnear	4	4
4	(Belgium) **L Pimek** (South Africa) **B Talbot**	**6**	**6**
(Australia) **D Macpherson** (United States) **T. J. Middleton**	**6**	**6**
Q	(Australia) J Holmes (Australia) A Painter	3	4
(Sweden) P Nyborg (France) G Raoux	4	**7**	6
2	(Netherlands) **P Haarhuis** (Netherlands) **J Siemerink**	**6**	6	**7**

Quarterfinals
LL	(South Africa) **N Godwin** (South Africa) **G Stafford**	3	**7**	**6**
WC	(Australia) P Cash (Australia) S Stolle	**6**	6	4
(Australia) J Eagle (Australia) A Florent	6	3
(Argentina) **L Lobo** (Spain) **J Sánchez**	**7**	**6**
WC	(Australia) G Doyle (Australia) P Tramacchi	4	1
4	(Belgium) **L Pimek** (South Africa) **B Talbot**	**6**	**6**
(Australia) D Macpherson (United States) T. J. Middleton	**7**	5	4
2	(Netherlands) **P Haarhuis** (Netherlands) **J Siemerink**	6	**7**	**6**

Semifinals
LL	(South Africa) N Godwin (South Africa) G Stafford	2	**6**	5
(Argentina) **L Lobo** (Spain) **J Sánchez**	**6**	3	**7**
4	(Belgium) L Pimek (South Africa) B Talbot	5	**7**	5
2	(Netherlands) **P Haarhuis** (Netherlands) **J Siemerink**	**7**	6	**7**

Final
(Argentina) **Luis Lobo** (Spain) **Javier Sánchez**	**6**	6	**6**
2	(Netherlands) Paul Haarhuis (Netherlands) Jan Siemerink	4	**7**	3
