= 1999 Sydney International =

- Date: 10–17 January
- Edition: 107th
- Category: International Series; Tier II
- Surface: Hard / outdoor
- Location: Sydney, Australia
- Venue: White City Stadium

Champions

Men's singles
- (United States) Todd Martin

Women's singles
- (United States) Lindsay Davenport

Men's doubles
- (Canada) Sébastien Lareau / (Canada) Daniel Nestor

Women's doubles
- (Russia) Elena Likhovtseva / (Japan) Ai Sugiyama
- Sydney International

The 1999 Sydney International was a tennis tournament played on outdoor hard courts at the White City Stadium in Sydney in Australia that was part of the International Series of the 1999 ATP Tour and of Tier II of the 1999 WTA Tour. The tournament was held from 10 through 17 January 1999.

== Finals ==
=== Men's singles ===
(United States) Todd Martin defeated (Spain) Àlex Corretja, 6–3, 7–6^{(7–5)}

- It was Martin's only title of the year and the 12th of his career.

=== Women's singles ===
(United States) Lindsay Davenport defeated (Switzerland) Martina Hingis, 6–4, 6–3

- It was Davenport's 1st title of the year and the 44th of her career.

=== Men's doubles ===
(Canada) Sébastien Lareau / (Canada) Daniel Nestor defeated (United States) Patrick Galbraith / (Netherlands) Paul Haarhuis, 6–3, 6–4

=== Women's doubles ===
(Russia) Elena Likhovtseva / (Japan) Ai Sugiyama defeated (United States) Mary Joe Fernández / (Germany) Anke Huber, 6–3, 2–6, 6–0

== WTA entrants ==
=== Seeds ===
- Ranking date: 4 January 1999

Country	Player	Rank	Seed
USA	Lindsay Davenport	1	1
SUI	Martina Hingis	2	2
ESP	Arantxa Sánchez Vicario	4	3
USA	Venus Williams	5	4
ESP	Conchita Martínez	8	5
GER	Steffi Graf	9	6
SUI	Patty Schnyder	11	7
BEL	Dominique Van Roost	12	8

=== Other entrants ===
The following players received wildcards into the women's singles main draw:

- (Australia) Rachel McQuillan
- (Australia) Alicia Molik

The following players received wildcards into the women's doubles main draw:

- (Australia) Alicia Molik / (Belgium) Dominique Van Roost

The following players received entry from the women's singles qualifying draw:

- (Slovakia) Karina Habšudová
- (Argentina) Inés Gorrochategui
- (France) Amélie Mauresmo
- (Russia) Tatiana Panova

The following players received entry from the women's doubles qualifying draw:

- (Canada) Sonya Jeyaseelan / (Chinese Taipei) Janet Lee
