= 1999 Sydney International – Men's doubles =

Men's doubles
- 1999 Sydney International

Final
- Champions: (Canada) Sébastien Lareau (Canada) Daniel Nestor
- Runners-up: (United States) Patrick Galbraith (Netherlands) Paul Haarhuis
- Score: 6–3, 6–4

Details
- Draw: 16
- Seeds: 4

Events
Singles	men	women
Doubles	men	women
- Sydney International

The 1999 Sydney International was a tennis tournament played on outdoor hard courts at the NSW Tennis Centre in Sydney in Australia that was part of the International Series of the 1999 ATP Tour and of Tier II of the 1999 WTA Tour. The tournament was held from 11 through 16 January 1999.

== Seeds ==
Champion seeds are indicated in bold text while text in italics indicates the round in which those seeds were eliminated.

1. (Canada) **Sébastien Lareau** / (Canada) **Daniel Nestor (champions)**
2. (United States) Patrick Galbraith / (Netherlands) Paul Haarhuis (final)
3. Unknown (withdrew)
4. (Australia) Joshua Eagle / (United States) Jim Grabb (first round)

== Draw ==
Key

- Q = Qualifier
- WC = Wild card
- LL = Lucky loser
- Alt = Alternate
- ITF = ITF entry
- PR = Protected ranking
- SR = Special ranking
- SE = Special exempt
- JE = Junior exempt
- JR = Junior Accelerator Programme entrant
- CO = College Accelerator Programme entrant
- NG = Next Gen Accelerator Program entrant
- w/o = Walkover
- r = Retired
- d = Defaulted

=== Finals ===
First round
1	(Canada) **S Lareau** **(Canada) D Nestor**	**6**	6	**7**
(Netherlands) T Kempers (Mexico) D Roditi	3	**7**	6
(Australia) **L Hewitt** **(Australia) T Woodbridge**	w/o
(United States) M Keil (North Macedonia) A Kitinov
(United Kingdom) **N Broad** **(United States) J Gimelstob**	5	**6**	**7**
4	(Australia) J Eagle (United States) J Grabb	**7**	3	6
(Australia) **A Florent** **(Australia) D Macpherson**	6	**6**	**6**
(South Africa) C Haggard (Sweden) P Nyborg	**7**	4	4
(Zimbabwe) **W Black** **(Australia) S Stolle**	3	**6**	**6**
(South Africa) D Adams (South Africa) J-L de Jager	**6**	4	4
(Australia) **A Kratzmann** **(Australia) P Tramacchi**	3	**6**	**7**
(Czech Republic) M Damm (Czech Republic) C Suk	**6**	4	6
(Argentina) **P Albano** **(Argentina) D Orsanic**	5	**6**	**6**
(South Africa) P Norval (Russia) A Olhovskiy	**7**	4	3
2	(United States) **P Galbraith** **(Netherlands) P Haarhuis**	6	**7**	**7**
(Australia) S Draper (Germany) N Kiefer	**7**	5	5

Quarterfinals
1	(Canada) **S Lareau** **(Canada) D Nestor**	**6**	6	**7**
(Australia) L Hewitt (Australia) T Woodbridge	4	**7**	6
(United Kingdom) **N Broad** **(United States) J Gimelstob**	**6**	**7**
(Australia) A Florent (Australia) D Macpherson	4	6
(Zimbabwe) W Black (Australia) S Stolle	**6**	3	4
(Australia) **A Kratzmann** **(Australia) P Tramacchi**	4	**6**	**6**
(Argentina) P Albano (Argentina) D Orsanic	6	2
2	(United States) **P Galbraith** **(Netherlands) P Haarhuis**	**7**	**6**

Semifinals
1	(Canada) **S Lareau** **(Canada) D Nestor**	**6**	6	**6**
(United Kingdom) N Broad (United States) J Gimelstob	4	**7**	3
(Australia) A Kratzmann (Australia) P Tramacchi	3	6
2	(United States) **P Galbraith** **(Netherlands) P Haarhuis**	**6**	**7**

Final
1	(Canada) **S Lareau** **(Canada) D Nestor**	**6**	**6**
2	(United States) P Galbraith (Netherlands) P Haarhuis	3	4
