= 2001 Adidas International – Men's singles =

Men's singles
- 2001 Adidas International

Final
- Champion: (Australia) Lleyton Hewitt
- Runner-up: (Sweden) Magnus Norman
- Score: 6–4, 6–1

Details
- Draw: 32 (3WC/4Q/2SE)
- Seeds: 8

Events
Singles	men	women
Doubles	men	women
← 2000 ·	Sydney International	· 2002 →

Lleyton Hewitt was the defending champion and won in the final 6–4, 6–1 against Magnus Norman. Hewitt became only the second player in the history of the tournament who successfully defended the title, after Pete Sampras won both the 1993 and 1994 editions.

== Seeds ==
A champion seed is indicated in bold text while text in italics indicates the round in which that seed was eliminated.

1. (Sweden) Magnus Norman (final)
2. (Australia) **Lleyton Hewitt (champion)**
3. (South Africa) Wayne Ferreira (first round)
4. (France) Cédric Pioline (first round)
5. (France) Arnaud Clément (second round)
6. (France) Sébastien Grosjean (semifinals)
7. (Germany) Tommy Haas (second round)
8. (Morocco) Younes El Aynaoui (first round)

== Draw ==
=== Key ===
- Q = Qualifier
- WC = Wild card
- LL = Lucky loser
- Alt = Alternate
- SE = Special exempt
- PR = Protected ranking
- ITF = ITF entry
- JE = Junior exempt
- w/o = Walkover
- r = Retired
- d = Defaulted
- SR = Special ranking

First round
1	(Sweden) **M Norman**	**6**	**7**
(Romania) A Pavel	3	5
WC	(Australia) **T Woodbridge**	**7^{7}**	**6**
Q	(United States) J Tarango	6^{5}	2
(Spain) C Moyá	1	6^{4}
Q	(Switzerland) **G Bastl**	**6**	**7^{7}**
SE	(Czech Republic) B Ulihrach	1	0	r
5	(France) **A Clement**	**6**	**3**
4	(France) C Pioline	6^{2}	3
(Sweden) **J Björkman**	**7^{7}**	**6**
Q	(Australia) S Draper	5	**6**	4
SE	(Australia) **J Stoltenberg**	**7**	4	**6**
(Czech Republic) S Doseděl	3	**6**	3
(Germany) **R Schüttler**	**6**	3	**6**
(United States) T Martin	3	2
7	(Germany) **T Haas**	**6**	**6**
6	(France) **S Grosjean**	**7^{7}**	**6**
WC	(Australia) R Fromberg	6^{3}	2
(Belarus) M Mirnyi	3	1
Q	(Belgium) **C Rochus**	**6**	**6**
(Switzerland) **M Rosset**	4	**7^{10}**	**6**
(Belarus) V Voltchkov	**6**	6^{8}	2
(Switzerland) **R Federer**	**6**	**6**
3	(South Africa) W Ferreira	3	4
8	(Morocco) Y El Aynaoui	5	4
(Italy) **G Pozzi**	**7**	**6**
(France) **F Santoro**	**6**	**6**
(Germany) D Prinosil	3	3
(Australia) **A Ilie**	**6**	**6**
(United States) M Chang	5	5
WC	(Australia) W Arthurs	**7^{7}**	6^{5}	2
2	(Australia) **L Hewitt**	6^{3}	**7^{7}**	**6**

Second round
1	(Sweden) **M Norman**	**6**	**6**
WC	(Australia) T Woodbridge	3	1
Q	(Switzerland) **G Bastl**	5	**6**	**6**
5	(France) A Clément	**7**	2	2
(Sweden) **J Björkman**	**6**	3	**7^{7}**
SE	(Australia) J Stoltenberg	4	**6**	6^{3}
(Germany) **R Schüttler**	**7^{9}**	**7^{10}**
7	(Germany) T Haas	6^{7}	6^{8}
6	(France) **S Grosjean**	3	**6**	**6**
Q	(Belgium) C Rochus	**6**	4	1
(Switzerland) M Rosset	1	2
(Switzerland) **R Federer**	**6**	**6**
(Italy) G Pozzi	5	5
(France) **F Santoro**	**7**	**7**
(Australia) A Ilie	4	1
2	(Australia) **L Hewitt**	**6**	**6**

Quarterfinals
1	(Sweden) **M Norman**	**6**	3	**6**
Q	(Switzerland) G Bastl	4	**6**	3
(Sweden) **J Björkman**	**6**	**6**
(Germany) R Schüttler	3	4
6	(France) **S Grosjean**	**7**	**6**
(Switzerland) R Federer	5	4
(France) F Santoro	4	1
2	(Australia) **L Hewitt**	**6**	**6**

Semifinals
1	(Sweden) **M Norman**	5	**6**	**7**
(Sweden) J Björkman	**7**	3	5
6	(France) S Grosjean	3	**6**	4
2	(Australia) **L Hewitt**	**6**	4	**6**

Final
1	(Sweden) Magnus Norman	4	1
2	(Australia) **Lleyton Hewitt**	**6**	**6**

== Qualifying ==
=== Seeds ===
1. (Czech Republic) ~~Sláva Doseděl~~ (moved to the main draw)
2. (United States) Chris Woodruff (final round)
3. (Belgium) **Christophe Rochus (Qualifier)**
4. (Spain) Alberto Martín (first round)
5. (United States) Paul Goldstein (final round)
6. (Germany) Alexander Popp (first round)
7. (Spain) David Sánchez (second round)
8. (Croatia) Ivan Ljubičić (first round)

=== Qualifiers ===
1. **(Switzerland) George Bastl**
2. **(Australia) Scott Draper**
3. **(Belgium) Christophe Rochus**
4. **(United States) Jeff Tarango**

=== Special exempts ===
1. **(Czech Republic) Bohdan Ulihrach** (runner-up at Doha)
2. **(Australia) Jason Stoltenberg** (semifinalist at Adelaide)

=== Draw ===
==== First qualifier ====
First round
Alt	(Germany) **Marc-Kevin Goellner**	**6**	5	**6**
(Slovakia) Ján Krošlák	4	**7**	4
(Switzerland) **George Bastl**	**6**	**6**
(Italy) Stefano Tarallo	2	3
(United States) Kevin Kim	2	3
(Armenia) **Sargis Sargsian**	**6**	**6**
(Austria) Julian Knowle	3	2
5	(United States) **Paul Goldstein**	**6**	**6**

Second round
Alt	(Germany) Marc-Kevin Goellner	2	3
(Switzerland) **George Bastl**	**6**	**6**
(Armenia) Sargis Sargsian	1	6^{4}
5	(United States) **Paul Goldstein**	**6**	**7^{7}**

Final Round
(Switzerland) **George Bastl**	**6**	4	**6**
5	(United States) Paul Goldstein	3	**6**	2

==== Second qualifier ====
First round
2	(United States) **Chris Woodruff**	**6**	**6**
(Spain) Julián Alonso	2	1
(Chile) Fernando González	6^{5}	2
(United States) **Justin Gimelstob**	**7^{7}**	**6**
WC	(Australia) Alun Jones	2	4
WC	(Australia) **Scott Draper**	**6**	**6**
(Italy) Cristiano Caratti	1	5
7	(Spain) **David Sánchez**	**6**	**7**

Second round
2	(United States) **Chris Woodruff**	**6**	**6**
(United States) Justin Gimelstob	4	1
WC	(Australia) **Scott Draper**	**6**	**6**
7	(Spain) David Sánchez	3	4

Final Round
2	(United States) Chris Woodruff	3	**6**	2
WC	(Australia) **Scott Draper**	**6**	4	**6**

==== Third qualifier ====
First round
3	(Belgium) **Christophe Rochus**	**6**	**6**
WC	(Australia) Todd Perry	3	2
(France) Michaël Llodra	**6**	1	2
(Switzerland) **Michel Kratochvil**	4	**6**	**6**
(Germany) **Tomas Behrend**	**6**	**6**
(Georgia (country)) Irakli Labadze	4	4
(Zimbabwe) **Kevin Ullyett**	2	**6**	**7^{8}**
8	(Croatia) Ivan Ljubičić	**6**	4	6^{6}

Second round
3	(Belgium) **Christophe Rochus**	2	**7^{8}**	**6**
(Switzerland) Michel Kratochvil	**6**	6^{6}	4
(Germany) **Tomas Behrend**	**6**	**6**
(Zimbabwe) Kevin Ullyett	2	2

Final Round
3	(Belgium) **Christophe Rochus**	**6**	5	**6**
(Germany) Tomas Behrend	4	**7**	1

==== Fourth qualifier ====
First round
4	(Spain) Alberto Martín	**7^{7}**	2	4
(Japan) **Takao Suzuki**	6^{4}	**6**	**6**
(United States) **Jeff Tarango**	**7^{7}**	2	**6**
WC	(Australia) Paul Baccanello	6^{3}	**6**	3
(Thailand) Paradorn Srichaphan	1	4
(Hungary) **Attila Sávolt**	**6**	**6**
(Spain) **Galo Blanco**	**6**	**6**
6	(Germany) Alexander Popp	3	2

Second round
(Japan) Takao Suzuki	3	4
(United States) **Jeff Tarango**	**6**	**6**
(Hungary) **Attila Sávolt**	**6**	**6**
(Spain) Galo Blanco	3	2

Final Round
(United States) **Jeff Tarango**	**6**	**6**
(Hungary) Attila Sávolt	3	0
