= 1992 NSW Open – Women's doubles =

Women's doubles
- 1992 NSW Open

Final
- Champions: (Spain) Arantxa Sánchez Vicario (Czechoslovakia) Helena Suková
- Runners-up: (United States) Mary Joe Fernández (United States) Zina Garrison
- Score: 7–6^{(7–4)}, 6–7^{(4–7)}, 6–2

Details
- Draw: 28 (1Q)
- Seeds: 8

Events
Singles	men	women
Doubles	men	women
← 1991 ·	Sydney International	· 1993 →

Arantxa Sánchez Vicario and Helena Suková successfully defended their title by defeating Mary Joe Fernández and Zina Garrison 7–6^{(7–4)}, 6–7^{(4–7)}, 6–2 in the final.

== Seeds ==
The first four seeds received a bye to the second round.

1. (Czechoslovakia) Jana Novotná / (Latvia) Larisa Savchenko-Neiland (quarterfinals)
2. (United States) Pam Shriver / (Commonwealth of Independent States) Natasha Zvereva (quarterfinals)
3. (United States) Patty Fendick / (United States) Gigi Fernández (quarterfinals)
4. (Spain) Arantxa Sánchez Vicario / (Czechoslovakia) Helena Suková (champions)
5. (United States) Mary Joe Fernández / (United States) Zina Garrison (final)
6. (United States) Lori McNeil / (Australia) Nicole Provis (first round)
7. (United States) Katrina Adams / (Netherlands) Manon Bollegraf (first round)
8. (United States) Mary Lou Daniels / (Germany) Claudia Kohde-Kilsch (second round)

== Draw ==
=== Key ===
- Q = Qualifier
- WC = Wild card
- LL = Lucky loser
- Alt = Alternate
- ITF = ITF entry
- PR = Protected ranking
- SR = Special ranking
- SE = Special exempt
- JE = Junior exempt
- JR = Junior Accelerator Programme entrant
- CO = College Accelerator Programme entrant
- NG = Next Gen Accelerator Program entrant
- w/o = Walkover
- r = Retired
- d = Defaulted

=== Finals ===
Semifinals
5	(United States) Mary Joe Fernández (United States) Zina Garrison	7^{7}	7
(United States) Shaun Stafford (United States) Marianne Werdel	6^{3}	5
4	(Spain) Arantxa Sánchez Vicario (Czechoslovakia) Helena Suková	7^{7}	4	6
(Australia) Rachel McQuillan (Germany) Claudia Porwik	6^{5}	6	3

Final
5	(United States) Mary Joe Fernández (United States) Zina Garrison	6^{4}	7^{7}	2
4	(Spain) Arantxa Sánchez Vicario (Czechoslovakia) Helena Suková	7^{7}	6^{4}	6

=== Top half ===
First round
(South Africa) R Fairbank-Nideffer (South Africa) L Gregory	1	5
(Belgium) S Appelmans (Commonwealth of Independent States) L Meskhi	6	7
(Japan) K Date (France) J Halard	6	6
(United States) D Graham (United States) K Po	2	3
(Australia) K Godridge (Australia) N Pratt	1	4
5	(United States) MJ Fernández (United States) Z Garrison	6	6
(United States) A Frazier (Japan) R Hiraki	6	6^{4}	6
(United States) C Cunningham (Netherlands) B Schultz	1	7^{7}	4
(United States) S Stafford (United States) M Werdel	6	6
(France) I Demongeot (Spain) C Martínez	4	2
(Argentina) B Fulco-Villella (Netherlands) N Muns-Jagerman	3	0
8	(United States) ML Daniels (Germany) C Kohde-Kilsch	6	6

Second round
1	(Czechoslovakia) J Novotná (Latvia) L Savchenko-Neiland	7	6
(Belgium) S Appelmans (Commonwealth of Independent States) L Meskhi	5	4
(Japan) K Date (France) J Halard	6^{2}	3
5	(United States) MJ Fernández (United States) Z Garrison	7^{7}	6
3	(United States) P Fendick (United States) G Fernández	6	3	6
(United States) A Frazier (Japan) R Hiraki	1	6	3
(United States) S Stafford (United States) M Werdel	1	6	6
8	(United States) ML Daniels (Germany) C Kohde-Kilsch	6	3	2

Quarterfinals
1	(Czechoslovakia) J Novotná (Latvia) L Savchenko-Neiland	5	6	4
5	(United States) MJ Fernández (United States) Z Garrison	7	2	6
3	(United States) P Fendick (United States) G Fernández	2	6	3
(United States) S Stafford (United States) M Werdel	6	2	6

Semifinals
5	(United States) MJ Fernández (United States) Z Garrison	7^{7}	7
(United States) S Stafford (United States) M Werdel	6^{3}	5

=== Bottom half ===
First round
6	(United States) L McNeil (Australia) N Provis	6	2	4
(Australia) L Field (United Kingdom) C Wood	1	6	6
Q	(Netherlands) I Driehuis (Australia) L Pleming	6	6
(Hungary) A Temesvári (France) S Testud	1	4
(France) A Dechaume (Argentina) F Labat	7	6^{5}	5
(Australia) JA Faull (Australia) R Stubbs	5	7^{7}	7
7	(United States) K Adams (Netherlands) M Bollegraf	6^{11}	6	2
(Australia) R McQuillan (Germany) C Porwik	7^{13}	2	6
(Australia) J Byrne (Australia) K Sharpe	7^{7}	2	1
(Indonesia) Y Basuki (United Kingdom) J Durie	6^{3}	6	6
(Czechoslovakia) A Strnadová (France) C Tanvier	6	3	6
(Australia) M Jaggard (New Zealand) J Richardson	2	6	1

Second round
(Australia) L Field (United Kingdom) C Wood	2	4
Q	(Netherlands) I Driehuis (Australia) L Pleming	6	6
(Australia) JA Faull (Australia) R Stubbs	6^{4}	6	2
4	(Spain) A Sánchez Vicario (Czechoslovakia) H Suková	7^{7}	3	6
(Australia) R McQuillan (Germany) C Porwik	6	6
(Indonesia) Y Basuki (United Kingdom) J Durie	3	3
(Czechoslovakia) A Strnadová (France) C Tanvier	6^{5}	7^{7}	3
2	(United States) P Shriver (Commonwealth of Independent States) N Zvereva	7^{7}	6^{4}	6

Quarterfinals
Q	(Netherlands) I Driehuis (Australia) L Pleming	2	6	3
4	(Spain) A Sánchez Vicario (Czechoslovakia) H Suková	6	2	6
(Australia) R McQuillan (Germany) C Porwik	6	2	6
2	(United States) P Shriver (Commonwealth of Independent States) N Zvereva	2	6	1

Semifinals
4	(Spain) A Sánchez Vicario (Czechoslovakia) H Suková	7^{7}	4	6
(Australia) R McQuillan (Germany) C Porwik	6^{5}	6	3
