= 2000 Adidas International – Women's doubles =

Women's doubles
- 2000 Adidas International

Final
- Champions: (France) Julie Halard-Decugis (Japan) Ai Sugiyama
- Runners-up: (Switzerland) Martina Hingis (France) Mary Pierce
- Score: 6–0, 6–3

Events
Singles	men	women
Doubles	men	women
← 1999 ·	Sydney International	· 2001 →

Elena Likhovtseva and Ai Sugiyama were the defending champions, but had different outcomes. While Likhovtseva teamed up with Amanda Coetzer and lost in first round to Sugiyama and Julie Halard-Decugis, Sugiyama teamed up with Halard-Decugis and successfully defended her title by defeating Martina Hingis and Mary Pierce in the final, 6–0, 6–3.

It was the 7th title for Halard-Decugis and the 11th title for Sugiyama in their respective doubles careers. It was also the 1st title for the pair during the season.

== Seeds ==
1. (United States) Lindsay Davenport / (United States) Corina Morariu (semifinals)
2. (United States) Lisa Raymond / (Australia) Rennae Stubbs (first round)
3. (Switzerland) Martina Hingis / (France) Mary Pierce (final)
4. (Romania) Irina Spîrlea / (Netherlands) Caroline Vis (first round)

== Draw ==
=== Key ===
- Q = Qualifier
- WC = Wild card
- LL = Lucky loser
- Alt = Alternate
- SE = Special exempt
- PR = Protected ranking
- ITF = ITF entry
- JE = Junior exempt
- w/o = Walkover
- r = Retired
- d = Defaulted
- SR = Special ranking

=== Draw ===
First round
1	(United States) L Davenport (United States) C Morariu	6	6
WC	(Australia) K-A Guse (Australia) K Kunce	1	1
(Australia) J Dokic (Spain) A Sánchez Vicario	5	6	6
(Slovenia) T Pisnik (France) A-G Sidot	7	3	2
3	(Switzerland) M Hingis (France) M Pierce	6	6
(Germany) A Huber (Argentina) P Tarabini	1	1
(Sweden) Å Carlsson (Belgium) D van Roost	4	6	3
(Russia) A Kournikova (Austria) B Schett	6	4	6
(Spain) V Ruano Pascual (Argentina) P Suárez	6	7
Q	(Australia) T Musgrave (Australia) B Stewart	4	5
(Belgium) L Courtois (France) A Mauresmo	6	7^{7}
4	(Romania) I Spîrlea (Netherlands) C Vis	4	6^{5}
(France) J Halard-Decugis (Japan) A Sugiyama	6	6
(South Africa) A Coetzer (Russia) E Likhovtseva	3	2
(United States) K Po (France) S Testud	6	6
2	(United States) L Raymond (Australia) R Stubbs	3	3

Quarterfinals
1	(United States) L Davenport (United States) C Morariu	7	6
(Australia) J Dokic (Spain) A Sánchez Vicario	5	2
3	(Switzerland) M Hingis (France) M Pierce	7^{7}	6
(Russia) A Kournikova (Austria) B Schett	6^{5}	1
(Spain) V Ruano Pascual (Argentina) P Suárez	4	6	6
(Belgium) L Courtois (France) A Mauresmo	6	2	2
(France) J Halard-Decugis (Japan) A Sugiyama	6	6
(United States) K Po (France) S Testud	4	1

Semifinals
1	(United States) L Davenport (United States) C Morariu	5	5
3	(Switzerland) M Hingis (France) M Pierce	7	7
(Spain) V Ruano Pascual (Argentina) P Suárez	1	0
(France) J Halard-Decugis (Japan) A Sugiyama	6	6

Final
3	(Switzerland) M Hingis (France) M Pierce	0	3
(France) J Halard-Decugis (Japan) A Sugiyama	6	6
