= 1992 NSW Open – Women's singles =

Women's singles
- 1992 NSW Open

Final
- Champion: (Argentina) Gabriela Sabatini
- Runner-up: (Spain) Arantxa Sánchez Vicario
- Score: 6–1, 6–1

Details
- Draw: 56 (2WC/8Q)
- Seeds: 16

Events
Singles	men	women
Doubles	men	women
← 1991 ·	Sydney International	· 1993 →

Jana Novotná was the defending champion, but lost in the quarterfinals to Anke Huber.

Gabriela Sabatini won the title by defeating Arantxa Sánchez Vicario 6–1, 6–1 in the final.

== Seeds ==
The first eight seeds received a bye to the second round.

1. (Argentina) Gabriela Sabatini (champion)
2. (Spain) Arantxa Sánchez Vicario (final)
3. (Czechoslovakia) Jana Novotná (quarterfinals)
4. (United States) Mary Joe Fernández (semifinals)
5. (Spain) Conchita Martínez (quarterfinals)
6. (Switzerland) ~~Manuela Maleeva-Fragniêre~~ (withdrew)
7. (United States) Zina Garrison (third round)
8. (Germany) Anke Huber (semifinals)
9. (Commonwealth of Independent States) Leila Meskhi (quarterfinals)
10. (Czechoslovakia) Helena Suková (third round)
11. (Belgium) Sabine Appelmans (second round)
12. (United States) Lori McNeil (second round)
13. (France) Julie Halard (third round)
14. (Commonwealth of Independent States) Natasha Zvereva (first round)
15. (United States) Gigi Fernández (quarterfinals)
16. (Czechoslovakia) Radka Zrubáková (second round)

== Draw ==
=== Key ===
- Q = Qualifier
- WC = Wild card
- LL = Lucky loser
- Alt = Alternate
- ITF = ITF entry
- PR = Protected ranking
- SR = Special ranking
- SE = Special exempt
- JE = Junior exempt
- JR = Junior Accelerator Programme entrant
- CO = College Accelerator Programme entrant
- NG = Next Gen Accelerator Program entrant
- w/o = Walkover
- r = Retired
- d = Defaulted

=== Finals ===
Quarterfinals
1	(Argentina) Gabriela Sabatini	6	7^{9}
15	(United States) Gigi Fernández	2	6^{7}
4	(United States) Mary Joe Fernández	6	6
9	(Commonwealth of Independent States) Leila Meskhi	1	2
8	(Germany) Anke Huber	6	7
3	(Czechoslovakia) Jana Novotná	3	5
5	(Spain) Conchita Martínez	4	2
2	(Spain) Arantxa Sánchez Vicario	6	6

Semifinals
1	(Argentina) Gabriela Sabatini	6	6
4	(United States) Mary Joe Fernández	2	3
8	(Germany) Anke Huber	6	5	3
2	(Spain) Arantxa Sánchez Vicario	4	7	6

Final
1	(Argentina) Gabriela Sabatini	6	6
2	(Spain) Arantxa Sánchez Vicario	1	1

=== Top half ===
==== Section 1 ====
First round
(United States) P Shriver	5	6	5
(Netherlands) M Bollegraf	7	2	7
(United States) L Harvey Wild	3	4
(Germany) S Hack	6	6
(Netherlands) B Schultz	6	3	4
12	(United States) L McNeil	3	6	6
15	(United States) G Fernández	6	4	6
Q	(Finland) P Thorén	2	6	1
(Australia) A Minter	1	4
(Australia) R McQuillan	6	6
WC	(Australia) K Godridge	6^{0}	1
(Japan) A Kijimuta	7^{7}	6

Second round
1	(Argentina) G Sabatini	6	6
(Netherlands) M Bollegraf	0	1
(Germany) S Hack	7^{8}	3	6
12	(United States) L McNeil	6^{6}	6	3
15	(United States) G Fernández	6	7
(Australia) R McQuillan	1	5
(Japan) A Kijimuta	4	6	2
7	(United States) Z Garrison	6	3	6

Third round
1	(Argentina) G Sabatini	6	6
(Germany) S Hack	1	0
15	(United States) G Fernández	7^{7}	5	6
7	(United States) Z Garrison	6^{5}	7	3

Quarterfinals
1	(Argentina) G Sabatini	6	7^{9}
15	(United States) G Fernández	2	6^{7}

==== Section 2 ====
First round
(United States) C Cunningham	6	6
Q	(Australia) M Jaggard	3	0
(United States) D Graham	4	6	6
Q	(United States) H Cioffi	6	4	3
(United States) G Helgeson	5	1
10	(Czechoslovakia) H Suková	7	6
14	(Commonwealth of Independent States) N Zvereva	5	1
(Japan) K Date	7	6
(Argentina) F Labat	6	6^{4}	1
(Australia) N Provis	1	7^{7}	6
(United Kingdom) J Durie	4	1
(France) A Dechaume	6	6

Second round
4	(United States) MJ Fernández	7	6
(United States) C Cunningham	5	3
(United States) D Graham	5	4
10	(Czechoslovakia) H Suková	7	6
(Japan) K Date	6	6
(Australia) N Provis	4	0
(France) A Dechaume	3	4
9	(Commonwealth of Independent States) L Meskhi	6	6

Third round
4	(United States) MJ Fernández	6	6
10	(Czechoslovakia) H Suková	4	4
(Japan) K Date	6	3	2
9	(Commonwealth of Independent States) L Meskhi	4	6	6

Quarterfinals
4	(United States) MJ Fernández	6	6
9	(Commonwealth of Independent States) L Meskhi	1	2

=== Bottom half ===
==== Section 3 ====
First round
(Canada) H Kelesi	3	6^{5}
(France) I Demongeot	6	7^{7}
(United States) T Whitlinger	6	1
(Czechoslovakia) R Rajchrtová	1	0^{r}
WC	(Australia) R Stubbs	4	6	1
11	(Belgium) S Appelmans	6	4	6
13	(France) J Halard	6	5	6
(Czechoslovakia) E Švíglerová	4	7	4
(Latvia) L Savchenko-Neiland	6	1	7^{7}
(United States) M Werdel	3	6	6^{5}
(United States) P Fendick	7	6
Q	(United States) S Rehe	5	4

Second round
8	(Germany) A Huber	7	6
(France) I Demongeot	5	1
(United States) T Whitlinger	6	6
11	(Belgium) S Appelmans	1	3
13	(France) J Halard	7^{8}	6
(Latvia) L Savchenko-Neiland	6^{6}	1
(United States) P Fendick	6^{3}	1^{r}
3	(Czechoslovakia) J Novotná	7^{7}	2

Third round
8	(Germany) A Huber	6	6
(United States) T Whitlinger	3	4
13	(France) J Halard	2	5
3	(Czechoslovakia) J Novotná	6	7

Quarterfinals
8	(Germany) A Huber	6	7
3	(Czechoslovakia) J Novotná	3	5

==== Section 4 ====
First round
(Switzerland) E Zardo	3	7	6
Q	(United States) S Stafford	6	5	3
Q	(United States) K Po	3	1
(Netherlands) N Muns-Jagerman	6	6
(United States) A Frazier	6	6
(Austria) B Paulus	0	2
16	(Czechoslovakia) R Zrubáková	1	6	6
Q	(United Kingdom) C Wood	6	4	3
Q	(Australia) J Byrne	5	5
(Germany) B Rittner	7	7
(Czechoslovakia) A Strnadová	6	4	6
(Canada) P Hy	1	6	3

Second round
5	(Spain) C Martínez	2	6	6
(Switzerland) E Zardo	6	4	2
(Netherlands) N Muns-Jagerman	4	6^{4}
(United States) A Frazier	6	7^{7}
16	(Czechoslovakia) R Zrubáková	2	6	3
(Germany) B Rittner	6	3	6
(Czechoslovakia) A Strnadová	6^{6}	3
2	(Spain) A Sánchez Vicario	7^{8}	6

Third round
5	(Spain) C Martínez	6	6
(United States) A Frazier	4	4
(Germany) B Rittner	5	0
2	(Spain) A Sánchez Vicario	7	6

Quarterfinals
5	(Spain) C Martínez	4	2
2	(Spain) A Sánchez Vicario	6	6
