= 1993 Peters NSW Open – Men's doubles =

Men's doubles
- 1993 Peters NSW Open

Final
- Champions: (Australia) Sandon Stolle (Australia) Jason Stoltenberg
- Runners-up: (United States) Luke Jensen (United States) Murphy Jensen
- Score: 6–3, 6–4

Details
- Draw: 16 (2WC/1Q)
- Seeds: 4

Events
Singles	men	women
Doubles	men	women
← 1992 ·	Sydney International	· 1994 →

Sergio Casal and Emilio Sánchez were the defending champions, but lost in the quarterfinals to Luke Jensen and Murphy Jensen.

Wildcards Sandon Stolle and Jason Stoltenberg won the title by defeating Luke and Murphy Jensen 6–3, 6–4 in the final.

== Seeds ==
1. (Australia) Mark Kratzmann / (Australia) Wally Masur (first round, retired)
2. (Netherlands) Tom Nijssen / (Czech Republic) Cyril Suk (semifinals)
3. (United States) Steve DeVries / (Australia) David Macpherson (first round)
4. (Spain) Sergio Casal / (Spain) Emilio Sánchez (quarterfinals)

== Draw ==
=== Key ===
- Q = Qualifier
- WC = Wild card
- LL = Lucky loser
- Alt = Alternate
- SE = Special exempt
- PR = Protected ranking
- ITF = ITF entry
- JE = Junior exempt
- w/o = Walkover
- r = Retired
- d = Defaulted
- SR = Special ranking

=== Draw ===
First round
1	(Australia) M Kratzmann (Australia) W Masur	3	6	1^{r}
(United States) M Briggs (United States) T Kronemann	6	3	2
(United States) M Keil (United States) D Randall	3	2
(Canada) G Michibata (United States) D Pate	6	6
4	(Spain) S Casal (Spain) E Sánchez	6	6	6
WC	(Spain) S Bruguera (Spain) C Costa	3	7	3
(Italy) O Camporese (Spain) J Sánchez	3	0
(United States) L Jensen (United States) M Jensen	6	6
(Belgium) L Pimek (United States) D Wheaton	4	6
(South Africa) D Adams (Australia) N Borwick	6	7
WC	(Australia) S Stolle (Australia) J Stoltenberg	7	6
3	(United States) S DeVries (Australia) D Macpherson	6	0
(South Africa) W Ferreira (South Africa) S Kruger	1
Q	(Italy) A Gaudenzi (Austria) T Muster	6	r
(South Africa) D Visser (Australia) L Warder	3	6	4
2	(Netherlands) T Nijssen (Czechoslovakia) C Suk	6	3	6

Quarterfinals
(United States) M Briggs (United States) T Kronemann	6	5	3
(Canada) G Michibata (United States) D Pate	4	7	6
4	(Spain) S Casal (Spain) E Sánchez	4	6
(United States) L Jensen (United States) M Jensen	6	7
(South Africa) D Adams (Australia) N Borwick	5	7	2
WC	(Australia) S Stolle (Australia) J Stoltenberg	7	6	6
(South Africa) W Ferreira (South Africa) S Kruger	6	6
2	(Netherlands) T Nijssen (Czechoslovakia) C Suk	7	7

Semifinals
(Canada) G Michibata (United States) D Pate	6	3	4
(United States) L Jensen (United States) M Jensen	3	6	6
WC	(Australia) S Stolle (Australia) J Stoltenberg	7	6
2	(Netherlands) T Nijssen (Czechoslovakia) C Suk	6	3

Final
(United States) L Jensen (United States) M Jensen	3	4
WC	(Australia) S Stolle (Australia) J Stoltenberg	6	6
