= 2002 Adidas International – Women's doubles =

Women's doubles
- 2002 Adidas International

Final
- Champions: (United States) Lisa Raymond (Australia) Rennae Stubbs
- Runners-up: (Switzerland) Martina Hingis (Russia) Anna Kournikova
- Score: Walkover

Details
- Draw: 16 (2WC/1Q)
- Seeds: 4

Events
| Singles | men | women |
| Doubles | men | women |
| ← 2001 · | Sydney International | · 2003 → |

Anna Kournikova and Barbara Schett were the defending champions, but played this year with different partners. Kournikova teamed up with Martina Hingis and reached the final before been forced to withdraw, while Schett teamed up with Silvia Farina Elia and lost in semifinals.

Lisa Raymond and Rennae Stubbs won the title by walkover, after Hingis had to withdraw due to a heat exhaustion and a minor thigh injury. It was the 28th title for Raymond and the 32nd title for Stubbs in their respective doubles careers.

== Seeds ==
1. (United States) Lisa Raymond / (Australia) Rennae Stubbs (champions)
2. (Belgium) Kim Clijsters / (Japan) Ai Sugiyama (first round)
3. (Spain) Conchita Martínez / (Netherlands) Caroline Vis (first round)
4. (Switzerland) Martina Hingis / (Russia) Anna Kournikova (final, withdrew)

== Draw ==
=== Key ===
- Q = Qualifier
- WC = Wild card
- LL = Lucky loser
- Alt = Alternate
- SE = Special exempt
- PR = Protected ranking
- ITF = ITF entry
- JE = Junior exempt
- w/o = Walkover
- r = Retired
- d = Defaulted
- SR = Special ranking

=== Draw ===
First round
1 | (United States) L Raymond (Australia) R Stubbs | 6 | 6
(Slovenia) T Križan (Slovenia) K Srebotnik | 3 | 3
(South Africa) A Coetzer (United States) L McNeil | 6 | 4 | 2
(Slovakia) D Hantuchová (Spain) A Sánchez Vicario | 4 | 6 | 6
3 | (Spain) C Martínez (Netherlands) C Vis | 7 | 2 | 1
(Italy) S Farina Elia (Austria) B Schett | 5 | 6 | 6
(Spain) M Serna (Sweden) Å Svensson | 6^{5} | 6 | 7^{7}
(Netherlands) M Oremans (France) S Testud | 7^{7} | 3 | 6^{3}
(Argentina) ME Salerni (Argentina) P Tarabini | 1 | 4
Q | (Slovakia) H Nagyová (Uzbekistan) I Tulyaganova | 6 | 6
(Chinese Taipei) J Lee (Indonesia) W Prakusya | 4 | 2
4 | (Switzerland) M Hingis (Russia) A Kournikova | 6 | 6
WC | (Russia) E Dementieva (Russia) L Krasnoroutskaya | 6 | 6
WC | (Australia) A Molik (United States) A Stevenson | 2 | 0
(Belgium) J Henin (United States) M Shaughnessy | 7^{7} | 6
2 | (Belgium) K Clijsters (Japan) A Sugiyama | 6^{4} | 2

Quarterfinals
1 | (United States) L Raymond (Australia) R Stubbs | 6 | 4 | 6
(Slovakia) D Hantuchová (Spain) A Sánchez Vicario | 1 | 6 | 4
(Italy) S Farina Elia (Austria) B Schett | 6^{0} | 7^{9} | 6
(Spain) M Serna (Sweden) Å Svensson | 7^{7} | 6^{7} | 3
Q | (Slovakia) H Nagyová (Uzbekistan) I Tulyaganova | 4 | 2
4 | (Switzerland) M Hingis (Russia) A Kournikova | 6 | 6
WC | (Russia) E Dementieva (Russia) L Krasnoroutskaya | 3 | 6 | 4
(Belgium) J Henin (United States) M Shaughnessy | 6 | 3 | 6

Semifinals
1 | (United States) L Raymond (Australia) R Stubbs | 6 | 3 | 6
(Italy) S Farina Elia (Austria) B Schett | 3 | 6 | 1
4 | (Switzerland) M Hingis (Russia) A Kournikova | 6 | 6
(Belgium) J Henin (United States) M Shaughnessy | 4 | 3

Final
1 | (United States) L Raymond (Australia) R Stubbs | w | / | o
4 | (Switzerland) M Hingis (Russia) A Kournikova

== Qualifying ==
=== Qualifying seeds ===
1. (United States) Nicole Arendt / (Bulgaria) Magdalena Maleeva (first round)
2. (Slovakia) Henrieta Nagyová / (Uzbekistan) Iroda Tulyaganova (qualified)

=== Qualifiers ===
1. (Slovakia) Henrieta Nagyová / (Uzbekistan) Iroda Tulyaganova

=== Qualifying draw ===
First round
1 | (United States) Nicole Arendt (Bulgaria) Magdalena Maleeva | 3
(Czech Republic) Dája Bedáňová (Czech Republic) Květa Hrdličková | 8
(Russia) Anastasia Myskina (Slovenia) Tina Pisnik | 6
2 | (Slovakia) Henrieta Nagyová (Uzbekistan) Iroda Tulyaganova | 8

Qualifying competition
(Czech Republic) Dája Bedáňová (Czech Republic) Květa Hrdličková | 0 | 4
2 | (Slovakia) Henrieta Nagyová (Uzbekistan) Iroda Tulyaganova | 6 | 6
