= 2000 Adidas International – Women's singles =

Women's singles
- 2000 Adidas International

Final
- Champion: (France) Amélie Mauresmo
- Runner-up: (United States) Lindsay Davenport
- Score: 7–6^{(7–2)}, 6–4

Details
- Draw: 28
- Seeds: 8

Events
Singles	men	women
Doubles	men	women
← 1999 ·	Sydney International	· 2001 →

Lindsay Davenport was the defending champion, but lost in the final 7–6^{(7–2)}, 6–4 against Amélie Mauresmo.

It was the 1st title for Mauresmo in the season and the 2nd title in her career.

== Seeds ==
The first four seeds received a bye into the second round.

1. (Switzerland) Martina Hingis (semifinals)
2. (United States) Lindsay Davenport (final)
3. (France) Mary Pierce (quarterfinals)
4. (Austria) Barbara Schett (second round)
5. (France) Julie Halard-Decugis (first round)
6. (France) Amélie Mauresmo (champion)
7. (South Africa) Amanda Coetzer (second round)
8. (Russia) Anna Kournikova (semifinals)

== Draw ==
=== Key ===
- Q = Qualifier
- WC = Wild card
- LL = Lucky loser
- Alt = Alternate
- SE = Special exempt
- PR = Protected ranking
- ITF = ITF entry
- JE = Junior exempt
- w/o = Walkover
- r = Retired
- d = Defaulted
- SR = Special ranking

=== Finals ===
Semifinals
1	(Switzerland) Martina Hingis	5	3
6	(France) Amélie Mauresmo	7	6
8	(Russia) Anna Kournikova	3	2
2	(United States) Lindsay Davenport	6	6

Final
6	(France) Amélie Mauresmo	7^{7}	6
2	(United States) Lindsay Davenport	6^{2}	4

=== Top half ===
First round
(Germany) A Huber	3	6	1
Q	(Belarus) O Barabanschikova	6	3	6
(Belgium) D van Roost	6	6
Q	(Argentina) P Suárez	2	2
(United States) L Raymond	6^{1}	0
7	(South Africa) A Coetzer	7^{7}	6
(Spain) C Martínez	5	7	6
(Luxembourg) A Kremer	7	5	2
Q	(Russia) N Petrova	6^{0}	6	4
(Croatia) S Talaja	7^{7}	3	6
(Japan) A Sugiyama	7^{7}	0	6^{5}
6	(France) A Mauresmo	6^{2}	6	7^{7}

Second round
1	(Switzerland) M Hingis	6	6
Q	(Belarus) O Barabanschikova	0	2
(Belgium) D van Roost	0	7	6
7	(South Africa) A Coetzer	6	5	4
3	(France) M Pierce	6	6
(Spain) C Martínez	1	4
(Croatia) S Talaja
6	(France) A Mauresmo	w/o

Quarterfinals
1	(Switzerland) M Hingis	6
(Belgium) D van Roost	1	r
3	(France) M Pierce	2	3
6	(France) A Mauresmo	6	6

Semifinals
1	(Switzerland) M Hingis	5	3
6	(France) A Mauresmo	7	6

=== Bottom half ===
First round
8	(Russia) A Kournikova	7^{7}	6
(Belgium) S Appelmans	6^{4}	2
(France) S Testud	3	1
(United States) J Capriati	6	6
WC	(United States) A Stevenson	6	6
(France) A-G Sidot	3	2
5	(France) J Halard-Decugis	4	4
(Spain) A Sánchez Vicario	6	6
WC	(Australia) E Dominikovic	7^{7}	4	2
WC	(Australia) J Dokic	6^{3}	6	6
Q	(Federal Republic of Yugoslavia) S Načuk	7^{9}	6^{5}	2
(Russia) E Likhovtseva	6^{7}	7^{7}	6

Second round
8	(Russia) A Kournikova	6	7
(United States) J Capriati	4	5
WC	(United States) A Stevenson	2	6	6
4	(Austria) B Schett	6	3	2
(Spain) A Sánchez Vicario	6	6
WC	(Australia) J Dokic	4	1
(Russia) E Likhovtseva	1	2
2	(United States) L Davenport	6	6

Quarterfinals
8	(Russia) A Kournikova	4	6	6
WC	(United States) A Stevenson	6	2	2
(Spain) A Sánchez Vicario	7^{7}	3	4
2	(United States) L Davenport	6^{5}	6	6

Semifinals
8	(Russia) A Kournikova	3	2
2	(United States) L Davenport	6	6
