= 1994 Peters NSW Open – Women's doubles =

Women's doubles
- 1994 Peters NSW Open
- 1993 Champions: (United States) Pam Shriver (Australia) Elizabeth Smylie

Final
- Champions: (United States) Patty Fendick (United States) Meredith McGrath
- Runners-up: (Czech Republic) Jana Novotná (Spain) Arantxa Sánchez Vicario
- Score: 6–2, 6–3

Events
Singles	men	women
Doubles	men	women
← 1993 ·	Sydney International	· 1995 →

Pam Shriver and Elizabeth Smylie were the defending champions but did not compete that year.

Patty Fendick and Meredith McGrath won in the final 6–2, 6–3 against Jana Novotná and Arantxa Sánchez Vicario.

== Seeds ==
Champion seeds are indicated in bold text while text in italics indicates the round in which those seeds were eliminated.

1. (Czech Republic) Jana Novotná / (Spain) Arantxa Sánchez Vicario (final)
2. n/a
3. (Spain) Conchita Martínez / (Australia) Rennae Stubbs (quarterfinals)
4. (United States) Zina Garrison-Jackson / (United States) Mary Joe Fernández (quarterfinals)

== Draw ==
=== Key ===
- Q = Qualifier
- WC = Wild card
- LL = Lucky loser
- Alt = Alternate
- SE = Special exempt
- PR = Protected ranking
- ITF = ITF entry
- JE = Junior exempt
- w/o = Walkover
- r = Retired
- d = Defaulted
- SR = Special ranking

First round
1	(Czech Republic) **J Novotná** (Spain) **A Sánchez Vicario**	**6**	**6**
(France) J Halard (Germany) A Huber	2	2
(United States) **K Po** (New Zealand) **J Richardson**	**6**	3	**6**
(Italy) L Ferrando (Belgium) D Monami	3	**6**	1
4	(United States) **Z Garrison-Jackson** (United States) **M J Fernández**	**1**
(Germany) B Rittner (Austria) J Wiesner	1	r
(Georgia (country)) L Meskhi (South Africa) E Reinach	6	4
(Canada) **J Hetherington** (United States) **S Stafford**	**7**	**6**
(Argentina) F Labat (Slovakia) R Zrubáková	5	5
(United States) **P Fendick** (United States) **M McGrath**	**7**	**7**
WC	(Australia) C Barclay (Australia) K-A Guse	3	**6**	4
3	(Spain) **C Martínez** (Australia) **R Stubbs**	**6**	4	**6**
Q	(United States) **N Arendt** (Australia) **K Radford**	**7**	**6**
(United States) L Davenport (United States) L Raymond	5	3
(Australia) N Provis (France) N Tauziat	4	4
LL	(United Kingdom) **V Lake** (United Kingdom) **C Wood**	**6**	**6**

Quarterfinals
1	(Czech Republic) **J Novotná** (Spain) **A Sánchez Vicario**	**6**	**7**
(United States) K Po (New Zealand) J Richardson	2	5
4	(United States) Z Garrison-Jackson (United States) M J Fernández	4	**6**	4
(Canada) **J Hetherington** (United States) **S Stafford**	**6**	4	**6**
(United States) **P Fendick** (United States) **M McGrath**	**7**	6	**7**
3	(Spain) C Martínez (Australia) R Stubbs	5	**7**	5
Q	(United States) **N Arendt** (Australia) **K Radford**	5	**7**	**7**
LL	(United Kingdom) V Lake (United Kingdom) C Wood	**7**	5	6

Semifinals
1	(Czech Republic) **J Novotná** (Spain) **A Sánchez Vicario**	**6**	**6**
(Canada) J Hetherington (United States) S Stafford	0	3
(United States) **P Fendick** (United States) **M McGrath**	**6**	**6**
Q	(United States) N Arendt (Australia) K Radford	3	0

Final
1	(Czech Republic) Jana Novotná (Spain) Arantxa Sánchez Vicario	2	3
(United States) **Patty Fendick** (United States) **Meredith McGrath**	**6**	**6**
