= 2000 Adidas International =

- Date: 9–15 January
- Edition: 108th
- Surface: Hard / outdoor
- Location: Sydney, Australia
- Venue: NSW Tennis Centre

Champions

Men's singles
- (Australia) Lleyton Hewitt

Women's singles
- (France) Amélie Mauresmo

Men's doubles
- (Australia) Mark Woodforde / (Australia) Todd Woodbridge

Women's doubles
- (France) Julie Halard-Decugis / (Japan) Ai Sugiyama
- Sydney International

The 2000 Adidas International was a combined men's and women's tennis tournament played on outdoor hard courts at the NSW Tennis Centre in Sydney in Australia that was part of the International Series of the 2000 ATP Tour and of Tier II of the 2000 WTA Tour. The tournament ran from 9 through 15 January 2000. Lleyton Hewitt and Amélie Mauresmo won the singles titles.

== Finals ==
=== Men's singles ===
(Australia) Lleyton Hewitt defeated (Australia) Jason Stoltenberg 6–4, 6–0

=== Women's singles ===
(France) Amélie Mauresmo defeated (United States) Lindsay Davenport 7–6^{(7–2)}, 6–4

=== Men's doubles ===
(Australia) Mark Woodforde / (Australia) Todd Woodbridge defeated (Australia) Lleyton Hewitt / (Australia) Sandon Stolle 7–5 6–4

=== Women's doubles ===
(France) Julie Halard-Decugis / (Japan) Ai Sugiyama defeated (Switzerland) Martina Hingis / (France) Mary Pierce 6–0, 6–3
