= 2001 Adidas International – Men's doubles =

Men's doubles
- 2001 Adidas International

Final
- Champions: (Canada) Daniel Nestor (Australia) Sandon Stolle
- Runners-up: (Sweden) Jonas Björkman (Australia) Todd Woodbridge
- Score: 2–6, 7–6^{(7–4)}, 7–6^{(7–5)}

Events
Singles	men	women
Doubles	men	women
← 2000 ·	Sydney International	· 2002 →

Todd Woodbridge and Mark Woodforde were the defending champions but only Woodbridge competed that year with Jonas Björkman.

Björkman and Woodbridge lost in the final 2–6, 7–6^{(7–4)}, 7–6^{(7–5)} against Daniel Nestor and Sandon Stolle.

== Seeds ==
Champion seeds are indicated in bold text while text in italics indicates the round in which those seeds were eliminated.

1. (Canada) **Daniel Nestor** / (Australia) **Sandon Stolle (champions)**
2. (Sweden) Jonas Björkman / (Australia) Todd Woodbridge (final)
3. (Australia) Joshua Eagle / (Australia) Andrew Florent (semifinals)
4. (South Africa) Ellis Ferreira / (United States) Brian MacPhie (quarterfinals)

== Draw ==
=== Key ===
- Q = Qualifier
- WC = Wild card
- LL = Lucky loser
- Alt = Alternate
- SE = Special exempt
- PR = Protected ranking
- ITF = ITF entry
- JE = Junior exempt
- w/o = Walkover
- r = Retired
- d = Defaulted
- SR = Special ranking

First round
1	(Canada) **D Nestor** (Australia) **S Stolle**	**6**	**6**
(Croatia) I Ljubičić (Spain) A Martín	2	1
(Australia) **M Hill** (United States) **J Tarango**	4	**6**	**6**
WC	(Australia) P Baccanello (Australia) T Perry	**6**	3	4
3	(Australia) **J Eagle** (Australia) **A Florent**	**7**	4	**7**
(Australia) P Kilderry (Australia) P Tramacchi	5	**6**	5
(Argentina) D Orsanic (France) F Santoro	3	**6**	3
WC	(Australia) **P Hanley** (Australia) **N Healey**	**6**	3	**6**
(Australia) **D Macpherson** (South Africa) **G Stafford**	**6**	**6**
(Italy) C Brandi (North Macedonia) A Kitinov	3	2
Q	(France) A Clément (France) S Grosjean	1	3
4	(South Africa) **E Ferreira** (United States) **B MacPhie**	**6**	**6**
(United States) **J Gimelstob** (United States) **S Humphries**	**6**	**7^{9}**
(Switzerland) R Federer (Switzerland) M Rosset	4	6^{7}
WC	(Australia) T Crichton (Australia) A Fisher	**7^{9}**	3	1
2	(Sweden) **J Björkman** (Australia) **T Woodbridge**	6^{7}	**6**	**6**

Quarterfinals
1	(Canada) **D Nestor** (Australia) **S Stolle**	**7**	**7^{7}**
(Australia) M Hill (United States) J Tarango	5	6^{5}
3	(Australia) **J Eagle** (Australia) **A Florent**	**6**	**7^{7}**
WC	(Australia) P Hanley (Australia) N Healey	4	6^{2}
(Australia) **D Macpherson** (South Africa) **G Stafford**	**6**	6^{4}	**6**
4	(South Africa) E Ferreira (United States) B MacPhie	4	**7^{7}**	3
(United States) J Gimelstob (United States) S Humphries	3	6^{9}
2	(Sweden) **J Björkman** (Australia) **T Woodbridge**	**6**	**7^{11}**

Semifinals
1	(Canada) **D Nestor** (Australia) **S Stolle**	**7**	**7^{7}**
3	(Australia) J Eagle (Australia) A Florent	5	6^{4}
(Australia) D Macpherson (South Africa) G Stafford	4	3
2	(Sweden) **J Björkman** (Australia) **T Woodbridge**	**6**	**6**

Final
1	(Canada) **Daniel Nestor** (Australia) **Sandon Stolle**	2	**7^{7}**	**7^{7}**
2	(Sweden) Jonas Björkman (Australia) Todd Woodbridge	**6**	6^{4}	6^{5}

== Qualifying ==
=== Seeds ===
1. (France) **Arnaud Clément** / (France) **Sébastien Grosjean (Qualifiers)**
2. (Switzerland) George Bastl / (Armenia) Sargis Sargsian (first round)

=== Qualifiers ===
1. **(France) Arnaud Clément / (France) Sébastien Grosjean**

==== Draw ====
First round
(Hungary) **Attila Sávolt** (Japan) **Takao Suzuki**	5	**6**	**6**
2	(Switzerland) George Bastl (Armenia) Sargis Sargsian	**7**	3	4

Final Round
1	(France) **Arnaud Clément** (France) **Sébastien Grosjean**	w/o
(Hungary) Attila Sávolt (Japan) Takao Suzuki
