= 1993 Peters NSW Open – Women's doubles =

Women's doubles
- 1993 Peters NSW Open

Final
- Champions: (United States) Pam Shriver (Australia) Elizabeth Smylie
- Runners-up: (United States) Lori McNeil (Australia) Rennae Stubbs
- Score: 7–6^{(7–4)}, 6–2

Details
- Draw: 16 (1WC)
- Seeds: 4

Events
Singles	men	women
Doubles	men	women
← 1992 ·	Sydney International	· 1994 →

Arantxa Sánchez Vicario and Helena Suková were the defending champions, but the pair were forced to withdraw before their first round match.

Pam Shriver and Elizabeth Smylie won the title by defeating Lori McNeil and Rennae Stubbs 7–6^{(7–4)}, 6–2 in the final.

== Seeds ==
1. (Spain) ~~Arantxa Sánchez Vicario~~ / (Czechoslovakia) ~~Helena Suková~~ (withdrew)
2. (United States) Mary Joe Fernández / (United States) Zina Garrison-Jackson (first round)
3. (United States) Lori McNeil / (Australia) Rennae Stubbs (final)
4. (Canada) Jill Hetherington / (United States) Kathy Rinaldi (first round)

== Draw ==
=== Key ===
- Q = Qualifier
- WC = Wild card
- LL = Lucky loser
- Alt = Alternate
- SE = Special exempt
- PR = Protected ranking
- ITF = ITF entry
- JE = Junior exempt
- w/o = Walkover
- r = Retired
- d = Defaulted
- SR = Special ranking

=== Draw ===
First round
(Finland) N Dahlman (Finland) P Thorén	4	0
WC	(Australia) C Barclay (Australia) KA Guse	6	6
(South Africa) R Fairbank-Nideffer (New Zealand) J Richardson	7	6
(Germany) A Huber (Slovakia) R Zrubáková	5	1
3	(United States) L McNeil (Australia) R Stubbs	6	5	6
(Sweden) Å Carlsson (Sweden) M Strandlund	4	7	1
(United States) A Frazier (Japan) R Hiraki	1	6	6
(Australia) R McQuillan (Germany) B Rittner	6	2	3
(United States) P Fendick (Czech Republic) A Strnadová	7^{7}	6
(Japan) K Date (Australia) M Jaggard-Lai	6^{5}	4
(United States) P Shriver (Australia) E Smylie	7	6
4	(Canada) J Hetherington (United States) K Rinaldi	5	3
(Argentina) F Labat (Argentina) P Tarabini	7^{7}	6
(Japan) E Iida (Australia) K Radford	6^{4}	2
(France) I Demongeot (South Africa) E Reinach	6	6
2	(United States) MJ Fernández (United States) Z Garrison-Jackson	4	1

Quarterfinals
WC	(Australia) C Barclay (Australia) KA Guse	6	1	6
(South Africa) R Fairbank-Nideffer (New Zealand) J Richardson	4	6	3
3	(United States) L McNeil (Australia) R Stubbs	7^{7}	6
(United States) A Frazier (Japan) R Hiraki	6^{4}	4
(United States) P Fendick (Czech Republic) A Strnadová	6	5	3
(United States) P Shriver (Australia) E Smylie	4	7	6
(Argentina) F Labat (Argentina) P Tarabini	3	7	2
(France) I Demongeot (South Africa) E Reinach	6	5	6

Semifinals
WC	(Australia) C Barclay (Australia) KA Guse	2	4
3	(United States) L McNeil (Australia) R Stubbs	6	6
(United States) P Shriver (Australia) E Smylie	6	7
(France) I Demongeot (South Africa) E Reinach	4	5

Final
3	(United States) L McNeil (Australia) R Stubbs	6^{4}	2
(United States) P Shriver (Australia) E Smylie	7^{7}	6
