= 2002 Adidas International – Women's singles =

Women's singles
- 2002 Adidas International

Final
- Champion: (Switzerland) Martina Hingis
- Runner-up: (United States) Meghann Shaughnessy
- Score: 6–2, 6–3

Details
- Draw: 28 (3WC/4Q)
- Seeds: 8

Events
Singles	men	women
Doubles	men	women
- Sydney International

Defending champion Martina Hingis successfully retained her title, by defeating Meghann Shaughnessy 6–2, 6–3 in the final. It was the 1st title for Hingis in the season and the 39th in her career.

== Seeds ==
The first four seeds received a bye into the second round.

1. (United States) Jennifer Capriati (second round)
2. (Switzerland) Martina Hingis (champion)
3. (Belgium) Kim Clijsters (semifinals)
4. (United States) Serena Williams (semifinals, retired)
5. (Belgium) Justine Henin (quarterfinals)
6. (France) Amélie Mauresmo (quarterfinals)
7. (France) Sandrine Testud (quarterfinals)
8. (United States) Meghann Shaughnessy (final)

== Draw ==
Key

- Q = Qualifier
- WC = Wild card
- LL = Lucky loser
- Alt = Alternate
- ITF = ITF entry
- PR = Protected ranking
- SR = Special ranking
- SE = Special exempt
- JE = Junior exempt
- JR = Junior Accelerator Programme entrant
- CO = College Accelerator Programme entrant
- NG = Next Gen Accelerator Program entrant
- w/o = Walkover
- r = Retired
- d = Defaulted

=== Finals ===
Semifinals
8	(United States) Meghann Shaughnessy	5
4	(United States) Serena Williams	4^{r}
3	(Belgium) Kim Clijsters	5	6	2
2	(Switzerland) Martina Hingis	7	4	6

Final
8	(United States) Meghann Shaughnessy	2	3
2	(Switzerland) Martina Hingis	6	6

=== Top half ===
First round
Q	(United States) A Stevenson	6	6^{0}	7
(Uzbekistan) I Tulyaganova	1	7^{7}	5
Q	(Slovakia) D Hantuchová	4	6	6
(Bulgaria) M Maleeva	6	4	4
WC	(Australia) A Molik	4	4
8	(United States) M Shaughnessy	6	6
WC	(Russia) A Kournikova	6	6
(Spain) Á Montolio	4	2
WC	(Australia) J Hewitt	0	1
(South Africa) A Coetzer	6	6
(Czech Republic) D Bedáňová	3	6^{6}
6	(France) A Mauresmo	6	7^{8}

Second round
1	(United States) J Capriati	6^{5}	6	4
Q	(United States) A Stevenson	7^{7}	3	6
Q	(Slovakia) D Hantuchová	4	1
8	(United States) M Shaughnessy	6	6
4	(United States) S Williams	6	4	6
WC	(Russia) A Kournikova	2	6	3
(South Africa) A Coetzer	3	7	3
6	(France) A Mauresmo	6	5	6

Quarterfinals
Q	(United States) A Stevenson	4	1
8	(United States) M Shaughnessy	6	6
4	(United States) S Williams	6	7^{8}
6	(France) A Mauresmo	4	6^{6}

Semifinals
8	(United States) M Shaughnessy	5
4	(United States) S Williams	4^{r}

=== Bottom half ===
First round
5	(Belgium) J Henin	7^{7}	6
(Austria) B Schett	6^{3}	3
(Russia) E Dementieva	4	6	1
(Spain) C Martínez	6	3	6
Q	(Russia) A Myskina	3	2
(Italy) S Farina Elia	6	6
7	(France) S Testud	6	6
Q	(Slovenia) T Pisnik	0	2
(Spain) A Sánchez Vicario	1	6	3
(Slovakia) H Nagyová	6	2	6
(Spain) M Serna	1	1
(United States) L Raymond	6	6

Second round
5	(Belgium) J Henin	6	6
(Spain) C Martínez	0	3
(Italy) S Farina Elia	7^{7}	4	1
3	(Belgium) K Clijsters	6^{4}	6	6
7	(France) S Testud	6	6
(Slovakia) H Nagyová	1	2
(United States) L Raymond	1	1
2	(Switzerland) M Hingis	6	6

Quarterfinals
5	(Belgium) J Henin	6^{5}	2
3	(Belgium) K Clijsters	7^{7}	6
7	(France) S Testud	4	2
2	(Switzerland) M Hingis	6	6

Semifinals
3	(Belgium) K Clijsters	5	6	2
2	(Switzerland) M Hingis	7	4	6

== Qualifying ==
=== Qualifying seeds ===
1. (Japan) Ai Sugiyama (qualifying competition)
2. (Slovakia) Daniela Hantuchová (qualified)
3. (n/a)
4. (Germany) Marlene Weingärtner (second round)
5. (Russia) Elena Bovina (qualifying competition)
6. (Russia) Anastasia Myskina (qualified)
7. (United States) Alexandra Stevenson (qualified)
8. (Slovenia) Tina Pisnik (qualified)

=== Qualifiers ===
1. (Slovenia) Tina Pisnik
2. (Slovakia) Daniela Hantuchová
3. (Russia) Anastasia Myskina
4. (United States) Alexandra Stevenson

=== Qualifying draw ===
==== First qualifier ====
First round
1	(Japan) Ai Sugiyama	4	6	6
WC	(Australia) Michelle Summerside	6	3	1
(Slovenia) Katarina Srebotnik	6	6
(Russia) Evgenia Kulikovskaya	3	3
(Italy) Nathalie Viérin	6	5	6
WC	(Australia) Monique Adamczak	2	7	1
(Croatia) Maja Palaveršić	1	6	3
8	(Slovenia) Tina Pisnik	6	3	6

Second round
1	(Japan) Ai Sugiyama	6	6^{4}	6
(Slovenia) Katarina Srebotnik	4	7^{7}	1
(Italy) Nathalie Viérin	4	4
8	(Slovenia) Tina Pisnik	6	6

Qualifying competition
1	(Japan) Ai Sugiyama	2	3
8	(Slovenia) Tina Pisnik	6	6

==== Second qualifier ====
First round
2	(Slovakia) Daniela Hantuchová	6	6
(Italy) Maria Elena Camerin	2	1
(Germany) Anca Barna	6	7
(Bulgaria) Lubomira Bacheva	4	5
(Czech Republic) Sandra Kleinová	6	7^{9}
(Denmark) Eva Dyrberg	0	6^{7}
(Switzerland) Marie-Gaïané Mikaelian	3	6	6^{6}
5	(Russia) Elena Bovina	6	4	7^{8}

Second round
2	(Slovakia) Daniela Hantuchová	6	6
(Germany) Anca Barna	3	4
(Czech Republic) Sandra Kleinová	5	2
5	(Russia) Elena Bovina	7	6

Qualifying competition
2	(Slovakia) Daniela Hantuchová	6	6
5	(Russia) Elena Bovina	1	4

==== Third qualifier ====
First round
Alt	(Estonia) Kaia Kanepi	6	6^{5}	6^{1}
(Croatia) Jelena Kostanić Tošić	4	7^{7}	7^{7}
(Argentina) María Emilia Salerni	6	6
(South Korea) Cho Yoon-jeong	4	4
(Australia) Kim Risson	1	0
(Czech Republic) Klára Koukalová	6	6
(Netherlands) Seda Noorlander	5	4
6	(Russia) Anastasia Myskina	7	6

Second round
(Croatia) Jelena Kostanić Tošić	6	3	2
(Argentina) María Emilia Salerni	4	6	6
(Czech Republic) Klára Koukalová	4	6	3
6	(Russia) Anastasia Myskina	6	4	6

Qualifying competition
(Argentina) María Emilia Salerni	1	7	3
6	(Russia) Anastasia Myskina	6	5	6

==== Fourth qualifier ====
First round
4	(Germany) Marlene Weingärtner	1	6	6
(Indonesia) Wynne Prakusya	6	3	1
(Chinese Taipei) Janet Lee	3	2
(Czech Republic) Adriana Gerši	6	6
WC	(Australia) Jenny Belobrajdic	2	5
WC	(Australia) Melissa Dowse	6	7
(Germany) Sabine Klaschka	2	6	3
7	(United States) Alexandra Stevenson	6	1	6

Second round
4	(Germany) Marlene Weingärtner	2	0
(Czech Republic) Adriana Gerši	6	6
WC	(Australia) Melissa Dowse	3	6	1
7	(United States) Alexandra Stevenson	6	1	6

Qualifying competition
(Czech Republic) Adriana Gerši	1	1
7	(United States) Alexandra Stevenson	6	6
