= 1993 Peters NSW Open =

- Date: 11–18 January
- Edition: 101st
- Category: World Series; Tier II
- Surface: Hard / outdoor
- Location: Sydney, Australia
- Venue: White City Stadium

Champions

Men's singles
- (United States) Pete Sampras

Women's singles
- (United States) Jennifer Capriati

Men's doubles
- (Australia) Sandon Stolle / (Australia) Jason Stoltenberg

Women's doubles
- (United States) Pam Shriver / (Australia) Elizabeth Smylie
- Sydney International

The 1993 Peters NSW Open was the 1993 edition of the annually-held NSW Open tennis tournament. It was held from 11 to 18 January, in Sydney, Australia, as part of the 1993 ATP Tour and the 1993 WTA Tour.

Pete Sampras won his first of two Sydney titles, while Jennifer Capriati won the women's singles.

== Finals ==
=== Men's singles ===
(United States) Pete Sampras defeated (Austria) Thomas Muster, 7–6^{(9–7)}, 6–1

=== Women's singles ===
(United States) Jennifer Capriati defeated (Germany) Anke Huber, 6–1, 6–4

=== Men's doubles ===
(Australia) Sandon Stolle / (Australia) Jason Stoltenberg defeated (United States) Luke Jensen / (United States) Murphy Jensen, 6–3, 6–4

=== Women's doubles ===
(United States) Pam Shriver / (Australia) Elizabeth Smylie defeated (United States) Lori McNeil / (Australia) Rennae Stubbs, 7–6^{(7–4)}, 6–2
