= 1994 Peters NSW Open – Men's doubles =

Men's doubles
- 1994 Peters NSW Open

Final
- Champions: (Australia) Darren Cahill (Australia) Sandon Stolle
- Runners-up: (Australia) Mark Kratzmann (Australia) Laurie Warder
- Score: 6–1, 7–6

Details
- Draw: 16 (2WC/1Q)
- Seeds: 4

Events
Singles	men	women
Doubles	men	women
← 1993 ·	Sydney International	· 1995 →

Sandon Stolle and Jason Stoltenberg were the defending champions but Stoltenberg chose to focus on the singles tournament, losing in the second round to Pete Sampras.

Stolle teamed up with Darren Cahill and successfully defended his title, by defeating Mark Kratzmann and Laurie Warder 6–1, 7–6 in the final.

== Seeds ==
1. (United States) Luke Jensen / (United States) Murphy Jensen (first round)
2. (Netherlands) Tom Nijssen / (Czech Republic) Cyril Suk (first round)
3. (United States) Ken Flach / (United States) Rick Leach (quarterfinals)
4. (United States) Scott Melville / (South Africa) Danie Visser (first round)

== Draw ==
=== Key ===
- Q = Qualifier
- WC = Wild card
- LL = Lucky loser
- Alt = Alternate
- SE = Special exempt
- PR = Protected ranking
- ITF = ITF entry
- JE = Junior exempt
- w/o = Walkover
- r = Retired
- d = Defaulted
- SR = Special ranking

=== Draw ===
First round
1	(United States) L Jensen (United States) M Jensen	6	5
Q	(United States) M Briggs (United States) M Keil	7	7
(United States) S DeVries (Australia) D Macpherson	6	3	6
(Netherlands) J Siemerink (Czech Republic) D Vacek	3	6	7
4	(United States) S Melville (South Africa) D Visser	6	6	4
WC	(Australia) D Cahill (Australia) S Stolle	7	3	6
(Germany) MK Goellner (South Africa) G Muller	4	6
(South Africa) W Ferreira (Spain) J Sánchez	6	7
WC	(Czech Republic) P Korda (United States) I Lendl	7	3	6
(United States) B Pearce (United States) D Randall	5	6	7
(Canada) S Lareau (Italy) D Nargiso	2	3
3	(United States) K Flach (United States) R Leach	6	6
(Australia) M Kratzmann (Australia) L Warder	6	6
(Spain) S Casal (Spain) E Sánchez	4	4
(Czech Republic) M Damm (Czech Republic) K Nováček	5	6	6
2	(Netherlands) T Nijssen (Czech Republic) C Suk	7	2	4

Quarterfinals
Q	(United States) M Briggs (United States) M Keil	5	3
(Netherlands) J Siemerink (Czech Republic) D Vacek	7	6
WC	(Australia) D Cahill (Australia) S Stolle	6	6	6
(South Africa) W Ferreira (Spain) J Sánchez	3	7	2
(United States) B Pearce (United States) D Randall	1	7	6
3	(United States) K Flach (United States) R Leach	6	6	2
(Australia) M Kratzmann (Australia) L Warder	6	3	6
(Czech Republic) M Damm (Czech Republic) K Nováček	3	6	4

Semifinals
(Netherlands) J Siemerink (Czech Republic) D Vacek	4	7	5
WC	(Australia) D Cahill (Australia) S Stolle	6	6	7
(United States) B Pearce (United States) D Randall	2	5
(Australia) M Kratzmann (Australia) L Warder	6	7

Final
WC	(Australia) D Cahill (Australia) S Stolle	6	7
(Australia) M Kratzmann (Australia) L Warder	1	6
