= 2002 Adidas International =

Tennis tournament held in Sydney, Australia

- Date: 6–13 January
- Edition: 110th
- Surface: Hard / outdoor
- Location: Sydney, Australia
- Venue: NSW Tennis Centre

Champions

Men's singles
- (Switzerland) Roger Federer

Women's singles
- (Switzerland) Martina Hingis

Men's doubles
- (United States) Donald Johnson / (United States) Jared Palmer

Women's doubles
- (United States) Lisa Raymond / (Australia) Rennae Stubbs
- Adidas International

The 2002 Adidas International was a combined men's and women's tennis tournament played on outdoor hard courts at the NSW Tennis Centre in Sydney in Australia that was part of the International Series of the 2002 ATP Tour and of Tier II of the 2002 WTA Tour. The tournament ran from 6 through 13 January 2002. Roger Federer and Martina Hingis won the singles titles.

== Finals ==
=== Men's singles ===
(Switzerland) Roger Federer defeated (Argentina) Juan Ignacio Chela 6–3, 6–3

- It was Federer's 1st title of the year and the 2nd of his career.

=== Women's singles ===
(Switzerland) Martina Hingis defeated (United States) Meghann Shaughnessy 6–2, 6–3

- It was Hingis' 1st title of the year and the 73rd of her career.

=== Men's doubles ===
(United States) Donald Johnson / (United States) Jared Palmer defeated (Australia) Joshua Eagle / (Australia) Sandon Stolle 6–4, 6–4

- It was Johnson's 2nd title of the year and the 23rd of his career. It was Palmer's 2nd title of the year and the 25th of his career.

=== Women's doubles ===
(United States) Lisa Raymond / (Australia) Rennae Stubbs defeated (Switzerland) Martina Hingis / (Russia) Anna Kournikova by walkover

- It was Raymond's 1st title of the year and the 32nd of her career. It was Stubbs' 1st title of the year and the 34th of her career.
