= 1994 Peters NSW Open – Women's singles =

Women's tennis match

Women's singles
- 1994 Peters NSW Open

Final
- Champion: (Japan) Kimiko Date
- Runner-up: (United States) Mary Joe Fernández
- Score: 6–4, 6–2

Details
- Draw: 32
- Seeds: 8

Events
Singles	men	women
Doubles	men	women
← 1993 ·	Sydney International	· 1995 →

Jennifer Capriati was the defending champion but did not compete that year.

Kimiko Date won in the final 6–4, 6–2 against Mary Joe Fernández.

== Seeds ==
A champion seed is indicated in bold text while text in italics indicates the round in which that seed was eliminated.

1. (Spain) Conchita Martínez (quarterfinals)
2. (Argentina) Gabriela Sabatini (semifinals)
3. (United States) Mary Joe Fernández (final)
4. (Germany) Anke Huber (first round)
5. (Japan) **Kimiko Date (champion)**
6. (United States) Zina Garrison-Jackson (quarterfinals)
7. (South Africa) Amanda Coetzer (first round)
8. (Austria) Judith Wiesner (first round)

== Draw ==
=== Key ===
- Q = Qualifier
- WC = Wild card
- LL = Lucky loser
- Alt = Alternate
- SE = Special exempt
- PR = Protected ranking
- ITF = ITF entry
- JE = Junior exempt
- w/o = Walkover
- r = Retired
- d = Defaulted
- SR = Special ranking

First round
1	(Spain) **C Martínez**	**6**	**6**
(Germany) S Hack	3	0
(Netherlands) S Rottier	5	4
Q	(Germany) **W Probst**	**7**	**6**
WC	(Australia) E Smylie	1	0	r
Q	(United States) **S Stafford**	**6**	**2**
Q	(United Kingdom) C Wood	1	2
5	(Japan) **K Date**	**6**	**6**
4	(Germany) A Huber	**7**	2	1
(Georgia (country)) **L Meskhi**	6	**6**	**6**
(Australia) N Provis	3	4
(Italy) **L Ferrando**	**6**	**6**
(Czech Republic) R Bobková	4	3
(United States) **P Fendick**	**6**	**6**
(Japan) **N Sawamatsu**	4	**6**	**6**
7	(South Africa) A Coetzer	**6**	3	3
6	(United States) **Z Garrison-Jackson**	**7**	**6**
(Netherlands) M Oremans	6	2
WC	(Australia) M Jaggard-Lai	2	2
(Belgium) **S Appelmans**	**6**	**6**
(United States) **A Frazier**	**7**	4	**6**
Q	(France) K Quentrec	5	**6**	4
(France) J Halard	6	3
3	(United States) **M J Fernández**	**7**	**6**
8	(Austria) J Wiesner	2	3
(Germany) **B Rittner**	**6**	**6**
(Argentina) **F Labat**	2	**7**	**6**
(United States) L Raymond	**6**	6	3
(United States) P Shriver	**6**	4	6
(United States) **K Po**	4	**6**	**7**
(Ukraine) N Medvedeva	5	**7**	4
2	(Argentina) **G Sabatini**	**7**	5	**6**

Second round
1	(Spain) **C Martínez**	2	**7**	**6**
Q	(Germany) W Probst	**6**	5	2
Q	(United States) S Stafford	**6**	2	1
5	(Japan) **K Date**	1	**6**	**6**
(Georgia (country)) L Meskhi	**6**	1	1
(Italy) **L Ferrando**	3	**6**	**6**
(United States) **P Fendick**	**6**	**7**
(Japan) N Sawamatsu	3	6
6	(United States) **Z Garrison-Jackson**	**7**	**7**
(Belgium) S Appelmans	5	5
(United States) A Frazier	2	6
3	(United States) **M J Fernández**	**6**	**7**
(Germany) **B Rittner**	**6**	**6**
(Argentina) F Labat	3	0
(United States) K Po	2	1
2	(Argentina) **G Sabatini**	**6**	**6**

Quarterfinals
1	(Spain) C Martínez	3	0
5	(Japan) **K Date**	**6**	**6**
(Italy) L Ferrando	3	1
(United States) **P Fendick**	**6**	**6**
6	(United States) Z Garrison-Jackson	5	2
3	(United States) **M J Fernández**	**7**	**6**
(Germany) B Rittner	1	3
2	(Argentina) **G Sabatini**	**6**	**6**

Semifinals
5	(Japan) **K Date**	**6**	5	**6**
(United States) P Fendick	2	**7**	1
3	(United States) **M J Fernández**	**7**	**6**
2	(Argentina) G Sabatini	5	1

Final
5	(Japan) **Kimiko Date**	**6**	**6**
3	(United States) Mary Joe Fernández	4	2
