= 2002 Adidas International – Men's doubles =

Men's doubles
- 2002 Adidas International

Final
- Champions: (United States) Donald Johnson (United States) Jared Palmer
- Runners-up: (Australia) Joshua Eagle (Australia) Sandon Stolle
- Score: 6–4, 6–4

Events
Singles	men	women
Doubles	men	women
← 2001 ·	Sydney International	· 2003 →

Daniel Nestor and Sandon Stolle were the defending champions but only Stolle competed that year with Joshua Eagle.

Eagle and Stolle lost in the final 6–4, 6–4 against Donald Johnson and Jared Palmer.

== Seeds ==
Champion seeds are indicated in bold text while text in italics indicates the round in which those seeds were eliminated.

1. (United States) **Donald Johnson** / (United States) **Jared Palmer (champions)**
2. (Australia) Joshua Eagle / (Australia) Sandon Stolle (final)
3. (United States) Mike Bryan / (Czech Republic) David Rikl (semifinals)
4. (Czech Republic) Petr Pála / (Czech Republic) Pavel Vízner (first round)

== Draw ==
=== Key ===
- Q = Qualifier
- WC = Wild card
- LL = Lucky loser
- Alt = Alternate
- SE = Special exempt
- PR = Protected ranking
- ITF = ITF entry
- JE = Junior exempt
- w/o = Walkover
- r = Retired
- d = Defaulted
- SR = Special ranking

First round
1	(United States) **D Johnson** (United States) **J Palmer**	**7^{7}**	**6**
WC	(Australia) A Ilie (Australia) T Larkham	6^{4}	2
(Argentina) L Arnold (Belgium) T Vanhoudt	**7**	4	1
WC	(Australia) **P Hanley** (Australia) **N Healey**	5	**6**	**6**
3	(United States) **M Bryan** (Czech Republic) **D Rikl**	**7**	**6**
(Australia) A Florent (Australia) D Macpherson	5	3
(Czech Republic) **M Damm** (Czech Republic) **D Vacek**	**6**	**6**
(France) M Llodra (Belarus) M Mirnyi	1	4
WC	(Australia) J Kerr (Australia) G Silcock	6^{3}	3
(France) **S Grosjean** (France) **F Santoro**	**7^{7}**	**6**
(Australia) **W Arthurs** (Australia) **M Hill**	6^{5}	**6**	**6**
4	(Czech Republic) P Pála (Czech Republic) P Vízner	**7^{7}**	2	3
(United States) J Stark (Zimbabwe) K Ullyett	4	6^{2}
(Argentina) **G Cañas** (Spain) **C Moyá**	**6**	**7^{7}**
(The Bahamas) M Knowles (United States) B MacPhie	3	**6**	4
2	(Australia) **J Eagle** (Australia) **S Stolle**	**6**	2	**6**

Quarterfinals
1	(United States) **D Johnson** (United States) **J Palmer**	**6**	**6**
WC	(Australia) P Hanley (Australia) N Healey	2	3
3	(United States) **M Bryan** (Czech Republic) **D Rikl**	**6**	**6**
(Czech Republic) M Damm (Czech Republic) D Vacek	2	3
(France) **S Grosjean** (France) **F Santoro**	**6**	**6**
(Australia) W Arthurs (Australia) M Hill	4	4
(Argentina) G Cañas (Spain) C Moyá	4	3
2	(Australia) **J Eagle** (Australia) **S Stolle**	**6**	**6**

Semifinals
1	(United States) **D Johnson** (United States) **J Palmer**	**7^{7}**	**6**
3	(United States) M Bryan (Czech Republic) D Rikl	6^{4}	4
(France) S Grosjean (France) F Santoro	3	5
2	(Australia) **J Eagle** (Australia) **S Stolle**	**6**	**7**

Final
1	(United States) **Donald Johnson** (United States) **Jared Palmer**	**6**	**6**
2	(Australia) Joshua Eagle (Australia) Sandon Stolle	4	4
