= 2000 Adidas International – Men's doubles =

Men's doubles
- 2000 Adidas International

Final
- Champions: (Australia) Mark Woodforde (Australia) Todd Woodbridge
- Runners-up: (Australia) Lleyton Hewitt (Australia) Sandon Stolle
- Score: 7–5, 6–4

Events
Singles	men	women
Doubles	men	women
← 1999 ·	Sydney International	· 2001 →

Sébastien Lareau and Daniel Nestor were the defending champions, but Nestor did not compete this year. Lareau teamed up with Michael Hill and lost in first round to David Adams and John-Laffnie de Jager.

Mark Woodforde and Todd Woodbridge won the title by defeating Lleyton Hewitt and Sandon Stolle 7–5, 6–4 in the final. It was the 61st title for both players in their respective careers. It was also the 2nd title for the pair during the season, after their win in Adelaide.

== Seeds ==
1. (Australia) Mark Woodforde / (Australia) Todd Woodbridge (champions)
2. (South Africa) David Adams / (South Africa) John-Laffnie de Jager (semifinals)
3. (Australia) Wayne Arthurs / (Australia) Patrick Rafter (semifinals)
4. (North Macedonia) Aleksandar Kitinov / (Russia) Andrei Olhovskiy (quarterfinals)

== Draw ==
=== Key ===
- Q = Qualifier
- WC = Wild card
- LL = Lucky loser
- Alt = Alternate
- SE = Special exempt
- PR = Protected ranking
- ITF = ITF entry
- JE = Junior exempt
- w/o = Walkover
- r = Retired
- d = Defaulted
- SR = Special ranking

=== Draw ===
First round
1	(Australia) M Woodforde (Australia) T Woodbridge	6	6
(Australia) J Eagle (Australia) A Florent	3	2
(Australia) A Kratzmann (Australia) P Tramacchi	4	6	6
(United States) D Johnson (Czech Republic) C Suk	6	4	4
3	(Australia) W Arthurs (Australia) P Rafter	6	6
(United Kingdom) N Broad (South Africa) B Haygarth	4	4
WC	(Australia) S Draper (Australia) J Stoltenberg	6	6
WC	(United States) L Jensen (United States) M Jensen	4	4
WC	(Australia) L Hewitt (Australia) S Stolle	7^{7}	6
(Brazil) J Oncins (Argentina) D Orsanic	6^{5}	4
(United States) M Keil (South Africa) P Norval	6	4	4
4	(North Macedonia) A Kitinov (Russia) A Olhovskiy	4	6	6
(Australia) D Macpherson (Sweden) P Nyborg	3	4
(Italy) C Brandi (Italy) M Bertolini	6	6
(Australia) M Hill (Canada) S Lareau	6^{5}	3
2	(South Africa) D Adams (South Africa) J-L de Jager	7^{7}	6

Quarterfinals
1	(Australia) M Woodforde (Australia) T Woodbridge	4	7	6
(Australia) A Kratzmann (Australia) P Tramacchi	6	5	3
3	(Australia) W Arthurs (Australia) P Rafter	w/o
WC	(Australia) S Draper (Australia) J Stoltenberg
WC	(Australia) L Hewitt (Australia) S Stolle	7^{7}	6
4	(North Macedonia) A Kitinov (Russia) A Olhovskiy	6^{5}	3
(Italy) C Brandi (Italy) M Bertolini	6	3	2
2	(South Africa) D Adams (South Africa) J-L de Jager	3	6	6

Semifinals
1	(Australia) M Woodforde (Australia) T Woodbridge	6	6
3	(Australia) W Arthurs (Australia) P Rafter	3	4
WC	(Australia) L Hewitt (Australia) S Stolle	4	6	6
2	(South Africa) D Adams (South Africa) J-L de Jager	6	1	4

Final
1	(Australia) M Woodforde (Australia) T Woodbridge	7	6
WC	(Australia) L Hewitt (Australia) S Stolle	5	4
