= 2001 Adidas International =

- Date: 7 – 14 January
- Edition: 109th
- Location: Sydney, Australia
- Venue: NSW Tennis Centre

Champions

Men's singles
- (Australia) Lleyton Hewitt

Women's singles
- (Switzerland) Martina Hingis

Men's doubles
- (Canada) Daniel Nestor / (Australia) Sandon Stolle

Women's doubles
- (Russia) Anna Kournikova / (Austria) Barbara Schett
- Adidas International

The 2001 Adidas International was a tennis tournament played on outdoor hard courts at the NSW Tennis Centre in Sydney in Australia that was part of the International Series of the 2001 ATP Tour and of Tier II of the 2001 WTA Tour. The tournament ran from 7 through 14 January 2001.

== ATP entrants ==
=== Seeds ===
Country	Player	Rank^{1}	Seed
SWE	Magnus Norman	4	1
AUS	Lleyton Hewitt	7	2
RSA	Wayne Ferreira	13	3
FRA	Cédric Pioline	16	4
FRA	Arnaud Clément	18	5
FRA	Sébastien Grosjean	19	6
GER	Tommy Haas	23	7
MAR	Younes El Aynaoui	25	8

- Rankings are as of January 1, 2001.

=== Other entrants ===
The following players received wildcards into the singles main draw:

- (Australia) Wayne Arthurs
- (Australia) Richard Fromberg
- (Australia) Todd Woodbridge

The following player received entry as a special exempt into the main draw:

- (Czech Republic) Bohdan Ulihrach

The following players received entry from the qualifying draw:

- (Switzerland) George Bastl
- (Australia) Scott Draper
- (Belgium) Christophe Rochus
- (United States) Jeff Tarango

== WTA entrants ==
=== Seeds ===
Country	Player	Rank^{1}	Seed
SUI	Martina Hingis	1	1
USA	Lindsay Davenport	2	2
USA	Monica Seles	4	3
ESP	Conchita Martínez	5	4
USA	Serena Williams	6	5
RUS	Anna Kournikova	9	6
RSA	Amanda Coetzer	12	7
USA	Jennifer Capriati	14	8

- Rankings are as of January 1, 2001.

=== Other entrants ===
The following players received wildcards into the singles main draw:

- (Australia) Evie Dominikovic
- (Australia) Alicia Molik
- (United States) Monica Seles

The following players received entry from the qualifying draw:

- (Russia) Nadia Petrova
- (Russia) Elena Bovina
- (United States) Brie Rippner
- (Slovenia) Tina Pisnik

== Finals ==
=== Men's singles ===
(Australia) Lleyton Hewitt defeated (Sweden) Magnus Norman 6–4, 6–1

- It was Hewitt's 1st title of the year and the 9th of his career.

=== Women's singles ===
(Switzerland) Martina Hingis defeated (United States) Lindsay Davenport 6–3, 4–6, 7–5

- It was Hingis' 1st title of the year and the 68th of her career.

=== Men's doubles ===
(Canada) Daniel Nestor / (Australia) Sandon Stolle defeated (Sweden) Jonas Björkman / (Australia) Todd Woodbridge 2–6, 7–6^{(7–4)}, 7–6^{(7–5)}

- It was Nestor's 2nd title of the year and the 18th of his career. It was Stolle's 1st title of the year and the 17th of his career.

=== Women's doubles ===
(Russia) Anna Kournikova / (Austria) Barbara Schett defeated (United States) Lisa Raymond / (Australia) Rennae Stubbs 6–2, 7–5

- It was Kournikova's 1st title of the year and the 13th of her career. It was Schett's only title of the year and the 8th of her career.
