= 1993 Peters NSW Open – Women's singles =

Women's singles
- 1993 Peters NSW Open

Final
- Champion: (United States) Jennifer Capriati
- Runner-up: (Germany) Anke Huber
- Score: 6–1, 6–4

Details
- Draw: 32 (2WC/4Q/2LL)
- Seeds: 8

Events
Singles	men	women
Doubles	men	women
← 1992 ·	Sydney International	· 1994 →

Gabriela Sabatini was the defending champion.

Jennifer Capriati won in the final 6–1, 6–4 against Anke Huber.

== Seeds ==
A champion seed is indicated in bold text while text in italics indicates the round in which that seed was eliminated.

1. (Argentina) Gabriela Sabatini (semifinals)
2. (Spain) Arantxa Sánchez Vicario (quarterfinals)
3. (United States) Mary Joe Fernández (withdrew)
4. (United States) Jennifer Capriati **(champion)**
5. (Germany) Anke Huber (final)
6. (Czech Republic) Helena Suková (first round)
7. (United States) Lori McNeil (second round)
8. (United States) Zina Garrison-Jackson (first round)

== Draw ==
=== Key ===
- Q = Qualifier
- WC = Wild card
- LL = Lucky loser
- Alt = Alternate
- ITF = ITF entry
- PR = Protected ranking
- SR = Special ranking
- SE = Special exempt
- JE = Junior exempt
- JR = Junior Accelerator Programme entrant
- CO = College Accelerator Programme entrant
- NG = Next Gen Accelerator Program entrant
- w/o = Walkover
- r = Retired
- d = Defaulted

=== Finals ===
Semifinals
1	(Argentina) Gabriela Sabatini	4	2
4	**(United States) Jennifer Capriati**	**6**	**6**
(United States) Amy Frazier	4	3
5	**(Germany) Anke Huber**	**6**	**6**

Final
4	**(United States) Jennifer Capriati**	**6**	**6**
5	(Germany) Anke Huber	1	4

=== Top half ===
First round
1	**(Argentina) G Sabatini**	**7**	**6**
(Japan) K Date	5	2
(Czech Republic) A Strnadová	5	2
**(United States) P Fendick**	**7**	**6**
**(Slovakia) R Zrubáková**	**7**	**6**
(Finland) N Dahlman	5	4
**(Germany) B Rittner**	**6**	3	5
6	(Czech Republic) H Suková	2	**6**	5^{r}
4	**(United States) J Capriati**	**6**	**6**
LL	(France) I Demongeot	1	2
**(South Africa) R Fairbank-Nideffer**	3	**6**	**7**
WC	(Australia) M Jaggard-Lai	**6**	1	6
(Australia) R McQuillan	3	**6**	5
**(United States) P Shriver**	**6**	4	**7**
(Argentina) F Labat	4	4
7	**(United States) L McNeil**	**6**	**6**

Second round
1	**(Argentina) G Sabatini**	**6**	4	**6**
(United States) P Fendick	4	**6**	2
(Slovakia) R Zrubáková	1	3
**(Germany) B Rittner**	**6**	**6**
4	**(United States) J Capriati**	6	**7**	**7**
(South Africa) R Fairbank-Nideffer	**7**	5	5
**(United States) P Shriver**	**6**	**7**
7	(United States) L McNeil	1	6

Quarterfinals
1	**(Argentina) G Sabatini**	**7**	**6**
(Germany) B Rittner	5	3
4	**(United States) J Capriati**	**6**	**6**
(United States) P Shriver	0	1

Semifinals
1	(Argentina) G Sabatini	4	2
4	**(United States) J Capriati**	**6**	**6**

=== Bottom half ===
First round
8	(United States) Z Garrison-Jackson	4	6
**(Belgium) S Appelmans**	**6**	**7**
Q	(Netherlands) M Oremans	**6**	1	2
**(United States) T Whitlinger**	2	**6**	**6**
WC	(Australia) E Smylie	3	5
Q	**(Belgium) D Monami**	**6**	**7**
LL	(France) N Herreman	3	2
**(United States) A Frazier**	**6**	**6**
5	**(Germany) A Huber**	**6**	4	**7**
(United States) A Grossman	4	**6**	6
**(Austria) J Wiesner**	**6**	4	**6**
Q	(Finland) P Thorén	4	**6**	4
(Argentina) B Fulco-Villella	1	1
Q	**(Netherlands) S Rottier**	**6**	**6**
(Georgia (country)) L Meskhi	**6**	4	0
2	**(Spain) A Sánchez Vicario**	4	**6**	**6**

Second round
(Belgium) S Appelmans	5	4
**(United States) T Whitlinger**	**7**	**6**
Q	(Belgium) D Monami	6	3
**(United States) A Frazier**	**7**	**6**
5	**(Germany) A Huber**	**6**	**6**
(Austria) J Wiesner	4	2
Q	(Netherlands) S Rottier	4	**6**	2
2	**(Spain) A Sánchez Vicario**	**6**	4	**6**

Quarterfinals
(United States) T Whitlinger	1	3
**(United States) A Frazier**	**6**	**6**
5	**(Germany) A Huber**	**7**	**6**
2	(Spain) A Sánchez Vicario	6	2

Semifinals
(United States) A Frazier	4	3
5	**(Germany) A Huber**	**6**	**6**
