= 2000 Adidas International – Men's singles =

Men's singles
- 2000 Adidas International

Final
- Champion: (Australia) Lleyton Hewitt
- Runner-up: (Australia) Jason Stoltenberg
- Score: 6–4, 6–0

Details
- Draw: 32
- Seeds: 8

Events
Singles	men	women
Doubles	men	women
← 1999 ·	Sydney International	· 2001 →

Todd Martin was the defending champion but lost to Ivan Ljubičić in the second round.

Lleyton Hewitt won the title, defeating Jason Stoltenberg 6–4, 6–0 in the final.

== Seeds ==
1. (Brazil) Gustavo Kuerten (first round)
2. (Ecuador) Nicolás Lapentti (quarterfinals)
3. (United States) Todd Martin (second round)
4. (France) Cédric Pioline (first round)
5. (Slovakia) Karol Kučera (quarterfinals)
6. (Spain) Albert Costa (first round)
7. (Slovakia) Dominik Hrbatý (second round)
8. (United States) Vince Spadea (first round)

== Draw ==
=== Key ===
- Q = Qualifier
- WC = Wild card
- LL = Lucky loser
- Alt = Alternate
- SE = Special exempt
- PR = Protected ranking
- ITF = ITF entry
- JE = Junior exempt
- w/o = Walkover
- r = Retired
- d = Defaulted
- SR = Special ranking

=== Finals ===
Semifinals
(Australia) Lleyton Hewitt	6	6
(Spain) Àlex Corretja	4	4
LL	(Croatia) Ivan Ljubičić	4	2
WC	(Australia) Jason Stoltenberg	6	6

Final
(Australia) Lleyton Hewitt	6	6
WC	(Australia) Jason Stoltenberg	4	0

=== Top half ===
First round
1	(Brazil) G Kuerten	4	6	4
(Spain) F Clavet	6	3	6
(France) S Grosjean	4	4
(Australia) L Hewitt	6	6
(Czech Republic) D Vacek	6	7^{9}
Q	(Monaco) J-R Lisnard	4	6^{7}
Q	(Romania) A Voinea	3	7^{7}	6
8	(United States) V Spadea	6	6^{5}	4
4	(France) C Pioline	4	4
(Spain) À Corretja	6	6
(Morocco) H Arazi	6	6
(Spain) F Mantilla	3	4
(Czech Republic) S Doseděl	6	6
WC	(Australia) M Woodforde	3	3
(Australia) A Ilie	3	7^{7}	6
6	(Spain) A Costa	6	6^{5}	4

Second round
(Spain) F Clavet	3	2
(Australia) L Hewitt	6	6
(Czech Republic) D Vacek	5	2
Q	(Romania) A Voinea	7	6
(Spain) À Corretja	3	6	7^{7}
(Morocco) H Arazi	6	3	6^{4}
(Czech Republic) S Doseděl	6	7
(Australia) A Ilie	3	5

Quarterfinals
(Australia) L Hewitt	6	6
Q	(Romania) A Voinea	3	4
(Spain) À Corretja	3	7	6
(Czech Republic) S Doseděl	6	5	3

Semifinals
(Australia) L Hewitt	6	6
(Spain) À Corretja	4	4

=== Bottom half ===
First round
5	(Slovakia) K Kučera	7^{7}	6
SE	(Czech Republic) M Damm	6^{3}	1
(France) A Clément	4	6	6
(Argentina) M Zabaleta	6	3	4
LL	(Croatia) I Ljubičić	6^{4}	6	6
(Russia) M Safin	7^{7}	3	3
(Ukraine) A Medvedev	1	7^{7}	3
3	(United States) T Martin	6	6^{1}	6
7	(Slovakia) D Hrbatý	6	7
Q	(Zimbabwe) K Ullyett	1	5
WC	(Australia) J Stoltenberg	6	6^{6}	6
Q	(Spain) J Díaz	1	7^{8}	4
(Austria) S Koubek	7^{7}	6
(Brazil) F Meligeni	6^{4}	1
(Morocco) Y El Aynaoui	6	3	3
2	(Ecuador) N Lapentti	3	6	6

Second round
5	(Slovakia) K Kučera	6	6
(France) A Clément	2	4
LL	(Croatia) I Ljubičić	7^{13}	6
3	(United States) T Martin	6^{11}	4
7	(Slovakia) D Hrbatý	4	6	4
WC	(Australia) J Stoltenberg	6	2	6
(Austria) S Koubek	6	0	4
2	(Ecuador) N Lapentti	4	6	6

Quarterfinals
5	(Slovakia) K Kučera	3	6	5
LL	(Croatia) I Ljubičić	6	3	7
WC	(Australia) J Stoltenberg	4	7	6
2	(Ecuador) N Lapentti	6	5	1

Semifinals
LL	(Croatia) I Ljubičić	4	2
WC	(Australia) J Stoltenberg	6	6
