= 2002 Adidas International – Men's singles =

Men's singles
- 2002 Adidas International

Final
- Champion: (Switzerland) Roger Federer
- Runner-up: (Argentina) Juan Ignacio Chela
- Score: 6–3, 6–3

Details
- Draw: 32 (3WC/4Q/1LL/2SE)
- Seeds: 8

Events
Singles	men	women
Doubles	men	women
← 2001 ·	Sydney International	· 2003 →

Lleyton Hewitt was the defending champion but did not compete that year.

Roger Federer won in the final 6–3, 6–3 against qualifier Juan Ignacio Chela.

== Seeds ==
A champion seed is indicated in bold text while text in italics indicates the round in which that seed was eliminated.

1. (France) Sébastien Grosjean (first round)
2. (Switzerland) **Roger Federer (champion)**
3. (United States) Andy Roddick (semifinals)
4. (Argentina) Guillermo Cañas (second round)
5. (France) Arnaud Clément (first round)
6. (Sweden) Thomas Johansson (first round)
7. (Spain) Carlos Moyá (first round)
8. (Spain) ~~Albert Portas~~ (withdrew due to a forearm injury)

== Draw ==
=== Key ===
- Q = Qualifier
- WC = Wild card
- LL = Lucky loser
- Alt = Alternate
- SE = Special exempt
- PR = Protected ranking
- ITF = ITF entry
- JE = Junior exempt
- w/o = Walkover
- r = Retired
- d = Defaulted
- SR = Special ranking

First round
1	(France) S Grosjean	3	4
SE	(Thailand) **P Srichaphan**	**6**	**6**
WC	(Australia) W Arthurs	5	6^{4}
(Belarus) **M Mirnyi**	**7**	**7^{7}**
(Germany) **R Schüttler**	**6**	**6**
(Germany) N Kiefer	2	2
(France) **J Boutter**	**7^{7}**	**7**
6	(Sweden) T Johansson	6^{4}	5
4	(Argentina) **G Cañas**	3	**6**	**6**
Q	(Paraguay) R Delgado	**6**	4	1
(France) **N Escudé**	**6**	**6**
(Spain) A Martín	1	4
Q	(Argentina) **J I Chela**	**6**	**7^{7}**
(Spain) A Costa	0	6^{2}
(South Africa) **W Ferreira**	**6**	**6**
5	(France) A Clément	2	4
7	(Spain) C Moyá	6^{5}	6^{4}
Q	(South Korea) **H-T Lee**	**7^{7}**	**7^{7}**
SE	(Slovakia) **K Kučera**	**6**	1	**6**
(France) F Santoro	4	**6**	3
(Czech Republic) **B Ulihrach**	**6**	**6**
(Ecuador) N Lapentti	3	1
WC	(Australia) A Ilie	4	4
WC/3	(United States) **A Roddick**	**6**	**6**
LL	(Spain) J Díaz	5	4
(Romania) **A Pavel**	**7**	**6**
(Chile) **M Ríos**	6^{5}	**6**	**7^{7}**
(Croatia) I Ljubičić	**7^{7}**	3	6^{1}
(Belgium) **X Malisse**	**6**
(Morocco) H Arazi	3	r
(Spain) T Robredo	6^{5}	6^{5}
2	(Switzerland) **R Federer**	**7^{7}**	**7^{7}**

Second round
SE	(Thailand) P Srichaphan	2	3
(Belarus) **M Mirnyi**	**6**	**6**
(Germany) R Schüttler	4	6^{3}
(France) **J Boutter**	**6**	**7^{7}**
4	(Argentina) G Cañas	4	1
(France) **N Escudé**	**6**	**6**
Q	(Argentina) **J I Chela**	**6**	1	**7^{7}**
(South Africa) W Ferreira	4	**6**	6^{1}
Q	(South Korea) **H-T Lee**	**6**	**6**
SE	(Slovakia) K Kučera	1	2
(Czech Republic) B Ulihrach	0	4
WC/3	(United States) **A Roddick**	**6**	**6**
(Romania) A Pavel	1	4
(Chile) **M Ríos**	**6**	**6**
(Belgium) X Malisse	2	4
2	(Switzerland) **R Federer**	**6**	**6**

Quarterfinals
(Belarus) **M Mirnyi**	**6**	**6**
(France) J Boutter	4	2
(France) N Escudé
Q	(Argentina) **J I Chela**	**w/o**
Q	(South Korea) H-T Lee	**7^{7}**	3	5
WC/3	(United States) **A Roddick**	6^{3}	**6**	**7**
(Chile) M Ríos	**7^{7}**	6^{4}	3
2	(Switzerland) **R Federer**	6^{2}	**7^{7}**	**6**

Semifinals
(Belarus) M Mirnyi	4	4
Q	(Argentina) **J I Chela**	**6**	**6**
WC/3	(United States) A Roddick	6^{3}	4
2	(Switzerland) **R Federer**	**7^{7}**	**6**

Final
Q	(Argentina) J I Chela	3	3
2	(Switzerland) **Roger Federer**	**6**	**6**

== Qualifying ==
=== Qualifying seeds ===
1. (South Africa) **Wayne Ferreira (qualified)**
2. (Denmark) Kristian Pless (second round)
3. (Belgium) Christophe Rochus (second round)
4. (Argentina) **Juan Ignacio Chela (qualified)**
5. (Spain) David Sánchez (first round)
6. (Russia) Nikolay Davydenko (first round)
7. (Chile) Nicolás Massú (second round)
8. (Germany) Lars Burgsmüller (first round)

=== Qualifiers ===
1. (South Africa) **Wayne Ferreira**
2. (South Korea) **Lee Hyung-taik**
3. (Paraguay) **Ramón Delgado**
4. (Argentina) **Juan Ignacio Chela**

=== Lucky losers ===
1. (Spain) **Jacobo Díaz** (replaced Albert Portas)

=== Special exempts ===
1. (Thailand) **Paradorn Srichaphan** (reached the final at Chennai)
2. (Slovakia) **Karol Kučera** (reached the semifinals at Chennai)

=== Qualifying draw ===
==== First qualifier ====
First round
1	**(South Africa) Wayne Ferreira**	**6**	**6**
(Israel) Noam Behr	3	2
(France) Michaël Llodra	6^{7}	4
**(United States) Vince Spadea**	**7^{9}**	**6**
**(Italy) Stefano Galvani**	**6**	**6**
(United Kingdom) Jamie Delgado	2	1
Alt	**(Greece) Vasilis Mazarakis**	**6**	**6**
8	(Germany) Lars Burgsmüller	4	4

Second round
1	**(South Africa) Wayne Ferreira**	**6**	3	**6**
(United States) Vince Spadea	4	**6**	4
(Italy) Stefano Galvani	6^{5}	5
Alt	**(Greece) Vasilis Mazarakis**	**7^{7}**	**7**

Qualifying competition
1	**(South Africa) Wayne Ferreira**	**6**	**6**
Alt	(Greece) Vasilis Mazarakis	4	4

==== Second qualifier ====
First round
2	**(Denmark) Kristian Pless**	**6**	**6**
WC	(Australia) Todd Reid	2	1
(Romania) Adrian Voinea	3	6^{4}
**(South Korea) Lee Hyung-taik**	**6**	**7^{7}**
**(Spain) Jacobo Díaz**	4	**6**	**6**
(Hungary) Attila Sávolt	**6**	3	4
WC	**(Australia) Peter Luczak**	4	**6**	**6**
5	(Spain) David Sánchez	**6**	3	2

Second round
2	(Denmark) Kristian Pless	3	0
**(South Korea) Lee Hyung-taik**	**6**	**6**
**(Spain) Jacobo Díaz**	3	**6**	**7**
WC	(Australia) Peter Luczak	**6**	4	5

Qualifying competition
**(South Korea) Lee Hyung-taik**	**6**	**6**
(Spain) Jacobo Díaz	4	4

==== Third qualifier ====
First round
3	**(Belgium) Christophe Rochus**	**6**	**6**
(Russia) Yuri Schukin	4	4
WC	(Australia) Alun Jones	4	3
**(United Kingdom) Martin Lee**	**6**	**6**
**(Paraguay) Ramón Delgado**	**6**	**7**
(Germany) Tomas Behrend	0	5
(Italy) Davide Sanguinetti	4	4
7	**(Chile) Nicolás Massú**	**6**	**6**

Second round
3	(Belgium) Christophe Rochus	4	**6**	4
**(United Kingdom) Martin Lee**	**6**	4	**6**
**(Paraguay) Ramón Delgado**	4	**6**	**7^{7}**
7	(Chile) Nicolás Massú	**6**	3	6^{1}

Qualifying competition
(United Kingdom) Martin Lee	1	4
**(Paraguay) Ramón Delgado**	**6**	**6**

==== Fourth qualifier ====
First round
4	**(Argentina) Juan Ignacio Chela**	**6**	4	**6**
WC	(Australia) Todd Larkham	3	**6**	3
(Czech Republic) Daniel Vacek	4	2
**(Uzbekistan) Vadim Kutsenko**	**6**	**6**
**(Italy) Federico Luzzi**	**7^{7}**	6^{8}	**6**
(Costa Rica) Juan Antonio Marín	6^{2}	**7^{10}**	4
**(United States) Chris Woodruff**	**6**	**7**
6	(Russia) Nikolay Davydenko	3	5

Second round
4	**(Argentina) Juan Ignacio Chela**	**6**	**6**
(Uzbekistan) Vadim Kutsenko	0	3
**(Italy) Federico Luzzi**	w/o
(United States) Chris Woodruff

Qualifying competition
4	**(Argentina) Juan Ignacio Chela**	**6**	**6**
(Italy) Federico Luzzi	2	0
