= 1992 NSW Open – Men's doubles =

Men's doubles
- 1992 NSW Open

Final
- Champions: (Spain) Sergio Casal (Spain) Emilio Sánchez
- Runners-up: (United States) Scott Davis (United States) Kelly Jones
- Score: 3–6, 6–1, 6–4

Details
- Draw: 16 (2WC/1Q)
- Seeds: 4

Events
Singles	men	women
Doubles	men	women
- Sydney International

Scott Davis and David Pate were the defending champions, but Pate did not compete this year.

Davis teamed up with Kelly Jones and the pair lost in the final to Sergio Casal and Emilio Sánchez. The score was 3–6, 6–1, 6–4.

== Seeds ==
1. (Australia) John Fitzgerald / (Sweden) Anders Järryd (quarterfinals)
2. (Australia) Todd Woodbridge / (Australia) Mark Woodforde (quarterfinals)
3. (Spain) Sergio Casal / (Spain) Emilio Sánchez (champions)
4. (United States) Scott Davis / (United States) Kelly Jones (final)

== Draw ==
Key

- Q = Qualifier
- WC = Wild card
- LL = Lucky loser
- Alt = Alternate
- ITF = ITF entry
- PR = Protected ranking
- SR = Special ranking
- SE = Special exempt
- JE = Junior exempt
- JR = Junior Accelerator Programme entrant
- CO = College Accelerator Programme entrant
- NG = Next Gen Accelerator Program entrant
- w/o = Walkover
- r = Retired
- d = Defaulted

=== Draw ===
First round
1	(Australia) J Fitzgerald (Sweden) A Järryd	6	3	6
(Netherlands) T Nijssen (Czech Republic) C Suk	2	6	1
(United States) L Jensen (Czechoslovakia) P Korda	4	5
(Italy) O Camporese (Australia) W Masur	6	7
4	(United States) S Davis (United States) K Jones	6	6
(Spain) J Sánchez (Australia) J Stoltenberg	3	4
WC	(France) G Forget (France) H Leconte	7	7
(United Kingdom) N Broad (South Africa) D Visser	6	6
(United States) P Annacone (United States) R Reneberg	5	4
Q	(Sweden) R Båthman (Sweden) R Bergh	7	6
WC	(Czechoslovakia) I Lendl (Sweden) J Svensson	6	4
3	(Spain) S Casal (Spain) E Sánchez	7	6
(United States) P McEnroe (United States) D Wheaton	6	6
(Australia) M Kratzmann (South Africa) P Norval	2	3
(United States) S DeVries (Australia) D Macpherson	3	3
2	(Australia) T Woodbridge (Australia) M Woodforde	6	6

Quarterfinals
1	(Australia) J Fitzgerald (Sweden) A Järryd	6	3
(Italy) O Camporese (Australia) W Masur	7	6
4	(United States) S Davis (United States) K Jones	6	7
WC	(France) G Forget (France) H Leconte	3	5
Q	(Sweden) R Båthman (Sweden) R Bergh	5	3
3	(Spain) S Casal (Spain) E Sánchez	7	6
(United States) P McEnroe (United States) D Wheaton	6	7
2	(Australia) T Woodbridge (Australia) M Woodforde	4	5

Semifinals
(Italy) O Camporese (Australia) W Masur	6	6	3
4	(United States) S Davis (United States) K Jones	3	7	6
3	(Spain) S Casal (Spain) E Sánchez	6	4	6
(United States) P McEnroe (United States) D Wheaton	3	6	4

Final
4	(United States) S Davis (United States) K Jones	6	1	4
3	(Spain) S Casal (Spain) E Sánchez	3	6	6
