= 1992 NSW Open – Men's singles =

Men's singles
- 1992 NSW Open

Final
- Champion: (Spain) Emilio Sánchez
- Runner-up: (France) Guy Forget
- Score: 6–3, 6–4

Details
- Draw: 32 (3WC/4Q/2SE)
- Seeds: 8

Events
Singles	men	women
Doubles	men	women
- Sydney International

Guy Forget was the defending champion, but lost in the final to Emilio Sánchez. The score was 6–3, 6–4.

== Seeds ==
1. (Germany) Michael Stich (first round)
2. (Czechoslovakia) Ivan Lendl (first round)
3. (France) Guy Forget (final)
4. (Czechoslovakia) Petr Korda (second round)
5. (Sweden) Magnus Gustafsson (second round)
6. (United States) Derrick Rostagno (first round)
7. (Spain) Emilio Sánchez (champion)
8. (United States) David Wheaton (semifinals)

== Draw ==
Key

- Q = Qualifier
- WC = Wild card
- LL = Lucky loser
- Alt = Alternate
- ITF = ITF entry
- PR = Protected ranking
- SR = Special ranking
- SE = Special exempt
- JE = Junior exempt
- JR = Junior Accelerator Programme entrant
- CO = College Accelerator Programme entrant
- NG = Next Gen Accelerator Program entrant
- w/o = Walkover
- r = Retired
- d = Defaulted

=== Finals ===
Semifinals
7	(Spain) Emilio Sánchez	6	7^{8}
(Italy) Omar Camporese	4	6^{6}
3	(France) Guy Forget	6	6
8	(United States) David Wheaton	3	2

Final
7	(Spain) Emilio Sánchez	6	6
3	(France) Guy Forget	3	4

=== Top half ===
First round
1	(Germany) M Stich	6	1	1
WC	(Australia) T Woodbridge	4	6	6
Q	(Australia) G Doyle	4	2
(Austria) T Muster	6	6
Q	(France) C Pioline	7^{7}	3	6^{0}
Q	(Australia) J Fitzgerald	6^{2}	6	7^{7}
(Austria) H Skoff	6^{0}	r
7	(Spain) E Sánchez	7^{7}
4	(Czechoslovakia) P Korda	6	7
Q	(Germany) P Baur	4	5
SE	(Sweden) C Bergström	3	6	6
(Commonwealth of Independent States) A Chesnokov	6	4	0
SE	(United States) J Tarango	5	6	6^{3}
(Italy) O Camporese	7	2	7^{7}
(Sweden) J Svensson	4	4
5	(Sweden) M Gustafsson	6	6

Second round
WC	(Australia) T Woodbridge	4	6	4
(Austria) T Muster	6	3	6
Q	(Australia) J Fitzgerald	4	4
7	(Spain) E Sánchez	6	6
4	(Czechoslovakia) P Korda	3	6	1
SE	(Sweden) C Bergström	6	2	6
(Italy) O Camporese	6	7^{7}
5	(Sweden) M Gustafsson	3	6^{3}

Quarterfinals
(Austria) T Muster	3	3
7	(Spain) E Sánchez	6	6
SE	(Sweden) C Bergström	7^{7}	4	1
(Italy) O Camporese	6^{3}	6	6

Semifinals
7	(Spain) E Sánchez	6	7^{8}
(Italy) O Camporese	4	6^{6}

=== Bottom half ===
First round
6	(United States) D Rostagno	2	4
(Italy) C Caratti	6	6
(Croatia) G Prpić	7^{9}	4	4
(United States) A Krickstein	6^{7}	6	6
(Spain) J Sánchez	7	7
(Netherlands) J Siemerink	5	5
(United States) R Reneberg	3	6	3
3	(France) G Forget	6	3	6
8	(United States) D Wheaton	7	7
WC	(Australia) W Masur	5	5
(United States) P McEnroe	4	6	6^{3}
(France) O Delaître	6	4	7^{7}
(Germany) CU Steeb	3	3
(Switzerland) J Hlasek	6	6
(Netherlands) R Krajicek	5	6	6
2/WC	(Czechoslovakia) I Lendl	7	3	3

Second round
(Italy) C Caratti	6	3	3
(United States) A Krickstein	4	6	6
(Spain) J Sánchez	2	4
3	(France) G Forget	6	6
8	(United States) D Wheaton	6	6
(France) O Delaître	4	3
(Switzerland) J Hlasek	6	6
(Netherlands) R Krajicek	4	4

Quarterfinals
(United States) A Krickstein	1	4
3	(France) G Forget	6	6
8	(United States) D Wheaton	3	6	7
(Switzerland) J Hlasek	6	1	5

Semifinals
3	(France) G Forget	6	6
8	(United States) D Wheaton	3	2
