= 1994 Peters NSW Open =

- Date: 10–16 January
- Edition: 102nd
- Category: World Series; Tier II
- Surface: Hard / outdoor
- Location: Sydney, Australia
- Venue: White City Stadium

Champions

Men's singles
- (United States) Pete Sampras

Women's singles
- (Japan) Kimiko Date

Men's doubles
- (Australia) Darren Cahill / (Australia) Sandon Stolle

Women's doubles
- (United States) Patty Fendick / (United States) Meredith McGrath
- Sydney International

The 1994 Peters NSW Open was a combined men's and women's tennis tournament played on outdoor hard courts at the White City Stadium in Sydney, Australia that was part of the World Series of the 1994 ATP Tour and of Tier II of the 1994 WTA Tour. It was the 102nd edition of the tournament and was held from 10 January through 16 January 1994. Pete Sampras and Kimiko Date won the singles titles.

== Finals ==
=== Men's singles ===
(United States) Pete Sampras defeated (United States) Ivan Lendl 7–6^{(7–5)}, 6–4

- It was Sampras' 1st title of the year and the 23rd of his career.

=== Women's singles ===
(Japan) Kimiko Date defeated (United States) Mary Joe Fernández 6–4, 6–2

- It was Date's 1st title of the year and the 3rd of her career.

=== Men's doubles ===
(Australia) Darren Cahill / (Australia) Sandon Stolle defeated (Australia) Mark Kratzmann / (Australia) Laurie Warder 6–1, 7–6

- It was Cahill's only title of the year and the 15th of his career. It was Stolle's 1st title of the year and the 3rd of his career.

=== Women's doubles ===
(United States) Patty Fendick / (United States) Meredith McGrath defeated (Czech Republic) Jana Novotná / (Spain) Arantxa Sánchez Vicario 6–2, 6–3

- It was Fendick's 1st title of the year and the 24th of her career. It was McGrath's 1st title of the year and the 10th of her career.
