= 1994 Peters NSW Open – Men's singles =

Men's singles
- 1994 Peters NSW Open

Final
- Champion: (United States) Pete Sampras
- Runner-up: (United States) Ivan Lendl
- Score: 7–6^{(7–5)}, 6–4

Details
- Draw: 32
- Seeds: 8

Events
Singles	men	women
Doubles	men	women
← 1993 ·	Sydney International	· 1995 →

Pete Sampras defeated Ivan Lendl, 7–6^{(7–5)}, 6–4 to win the 1994 Medibank International tennis singles event. Sampras defended his title from 1993.

== Seeds ==
1. (United States) Pete Sampras (champion)
2. N/A
3. (Austria) Thomas Muster (second round)
4. (France) Cédric Pioline (first round)
5. (Czech Republic) Petr Korda (semifinals)
6. (United States) Todd Martin (semifinals)
7. (Switzerland) Marc Rosset (second round)
8. (Czech Republic) Karel Nováček (first round)

== Draws ==
=== Key ===
- Q = Qualifier
- WC = Wild card
- LL = Lucky loser
- Alt = Alternate
- SE = Special exempt
- PR = Protected ranking
- ITF = ITF entry
- JE = Junior exempt
- w/o = Walkover
- r = Retired
- d = Defaulted
- SR = Special ranking

=== Finals ===
Semifinals
1/WC	(United States) Pete Sampras	6	6
5	(Czech Republic) Petr Korda	3	3
6	(United States) Todd Martin	4	2
(United States) Ivan Lendl	6	6

Final
1/WC	(United States) Pete Sampras	7^{7}	6
(United States) Ivan Lendl	6^{5}	4

=== Section 1 ===
First round
1/WC	(United States) P Sampras	6	6
(Sweden) J Svensson	4	2
(Australia) R Fromberg	7^{7}	6^{4}	3
(Australia) J Stoltenberg	6^{4}	7^{7}	6
(United States) A Krickstein	7	7^{7}
(Peru) J Yzaga	5	6^{5}
(South Africa) W Ferreira	4	0^{r}
7	(Switzerland) M Rosset	6	1
3	(Austria) T Muster	7^{7}	6
Q	(Netherlands) J Siemerink	6^{5}	3
WC	(Australia) P Cash	6	3	2
Q	(Czech Republic) D Vacek	4	6	6
(Israel) A Mansdorf	4	2
Q	(Japan) S Matsuoka	6	6
(Sweden) M Pernfors	7^{7}	3	3
5	(Czech Republic) P Korda	6^{4}	6	6

Second round
1/WC	(United States) P Sampras	6	4	7
(Australia) J Stoltenberg	1	6	5
(United States) A Krickstein	6	7
7	(Switzerland) M Rosset	3	5
3	(Austria) T Muster	6^{5}	7	4
Q	(Czech Republic) D Vacek	7^{7}	5	6
Q	(Japan) S Matsuoka	6	4	6^{3}
5	(Czech Republic) P Korda	2	6	7^{7}

Quarterfinals
1/WC	(United States) P Sampras	6	6
(United States) A Krickstein	1	3
Q	(Czech Republic) D Vacek	3	2
5	(Czech Republic) P Korda	6	6

Semifinals
1/WC	(United States) P Sampras	6	6
5	(Czech Republic) P Korda	3	3

=== Section 2 ===
First round
6	(United States) T Martin	6	4	6
(Russia) Y Kafelnikov	3	6	2
Q	(United Kingdom) A Foster	3	6^{4}
(Spain) E Sánchez	6	7^{7}
(United States) M Washington	5	6	3
(Sweden) N Kulti	7	4	6
(Russia) A Chesnokov	6	5	6
4	(France) C Pioline	1	7	4
8	(Czech Republic) K Nováček	1	3
(United States) R Reneberg	6	6
(Spain) J Sánchez	4	3
(France) A Boetsch	6	6
(United States) I Lendl	6	6
WC	(Sweden) M Wilander	2	1
(Germany) MK Goellner	1	6^{4}
LL	(Australia) J Morgan	6	7^{7}

Second round
6	(United States) T Martin	6	6^{2}	6
(Spain) E Sánchez	4	7^{7}	4
(Sweden) N Kulti	6^{4}	6	6
(Russia) A Chesnokov	7^{7}	2	4
(United States) R Reneberg	6	7
(France) A Boetsch	3	5
(United States) I Lendl	6	7
LL	(Australia) J Morgan	3	5

Quarterfinals
6	(United States) T Martin	5	6	7^{7}
(Sweden) N Kulti	7	1	6^{1}
(United States) R Reneberg	6^{2}	6	3
(United States) I Lendl	7^{7}	4	6

Semifinals
6	(United States) T Martin	4	2
(United States) I Lendl	6	6
