= 1993 Peters NSW Open – Men's singles =

Men's singles
- 1993 Peters NSW Open

Final
- Champion: (United States) Pete Sampras
- Runner-up: (Austria) Thomas Muster
- Score: 7–6^{(9–7)}, 6–1

Details
- Draw: 32
- Seeds: 8

Events
Singles	men	women
Doubles	men	women
← 1992 ·	Sydney International	· 1994 →

Pete Sampras defeated Thomas Muster to win the 1993 Peters NSW Open men's singles event.

== Seeds ==
1. (United States) Pete Sampras (champion)
2. (Netherlands) Richard Krajicek (first round)
3. (France) Guy Forget (first round)
4. (South Africa) Wayne Ferreira (quarterfinals)
5. (Spain) Carlos Costa (first round)
6. (Spain) Sergi Bruguera (first round)
7. (Austria) Thomas Muster (finalist)
8. (Sweden) Henrik Holm (second round)

== Draws ==
=== Key ===
- Q = Qualifier
- WC = Wild card
- LL = Lucky loser
- Alt = Alternate
- SE = Special exempt
- PR = Protected ranking
- ITF = ITF entry
- JE = Junior exempt
- w/o = Walkover
- r = Retired
- d = Defaulted
- SR = Special ranking

=== Finals ===
Semifinals
1	(United States) Pete Sampras	6	7
3	(Israel) Amos Mansdorf	3	5
(Italy) Omar Camporese	4	3
7	(Austria) Thomas Muster	6	6

Final
1	(United States) Pete Sampras	7^{9}	6
7	(Austria) Thomas Muster	6^{7}	1

=== Section 1 ===
First round
1	(United States) P Sampras	2	6	6
(Ukraine) A Medvedev	6	3	2
(Australia) M Woodforde	4	6	6
(Sweden) T Enqvist	6	1	4
(Sweden) N Kulti	6	6
(Sweden) M Gustafsson	3	3
(Argentina) A Mancini	4	0
8/WC	(Sweden) H Holm	6	6
3	(France) G Forget	6^{7}	3
(France) C Pioline	7^{9}	6
(United States) D Wheaton	7^{9}	7^{7}
(France) A Boetsch	6^{7}	6^{2}
(Sweden) C Bergström	6	6
(Sweden) M Larsson	4	2
(Israel) A Mansdorf	6	5	6
5	(Spain) C Costa	1	7	4

Second round
1	(United States) P Sampras	6	6
(Australia) M Woodforde	4	3
(Sweden) N Kulti	7	6
8/WC	(Sweden) H Holm	5	4
(France) C Pioline	6	3	4
(United States) D Wheaton	3	6	6
(Sweden) C Bergström	5	2
(Israel) A Mansdorf	7	6

Quarterfinals
1	(United States) P Sampras	6	6
5	(Sweden) N Kulti	4	2
(United States) D Wheaton	6^{2}	1
(Israel) A Mansdorf	7^{7}	6

Semifinals
1	(United States) P Sampras	6	7
(Israel) A Mansdorf	3	5

=== Section 2 ===
First round
6	(Spain) S Bruguera	7^{7}	6^{4}	4
Q	(Australia) M Tebbutt	6^{0}	7^{7}	6
WC	(Australia) G Doyle	3	6	3
(Italy) O Camporese	6	4	6
WC	(Australia) S Stolle	6	6
Q	(United States) L Jensen	3	2
Q	(Sweden) J Apell	2	5
4	(South Africa) W Ferreira	6	7
7	(Austria) T Muster	6	6
(Russia) A Cherkasov	4	2
(Australia) W Masur	6	4	3
(Australia) R Fromberg	4	6	6
Q	(Sweden) J Svensson	6	4	7
(Spain) J Sánchez	2	6	5
(Spain) E Sánchez	7^{9}	7^{7}
2	(Netherlands) R Krajicek	6^{7}	6^{3}

Second round
Q	(Australia) M Tebbutt	6	6^{2}	2
(Italy) O Camporese	2	7^{7}	6
WC	(Australia) S Stolle	4	2
4	(South Africa) W Ferreira	6	6
7	(Austria) T Muster	6	7^{7}
(Australia) R Fromberg	4	^{5}
Q	(Sweden) J Svensson	7^{7}	6
(Spain) E Sánchez	6^{0}	4

Quarterfinals
(Italy) O Camporese	4	6	6
4	(South Africa) W Ferreira	6	3	4
7	(Austria) T Muster	7^{7}	7^{12}
Q	(Sweden) J Svensson	6^{5}	6^{10}

Semifinals
(Italy) O Camporese	4	3
7	(Austria) T Muster	6	6
