= 2001 Adidas International – Women's singles =

Women's singles
- 2001 Adidas International
- 2000 Champion: (France) Amélie Mauresmo

Final
- Champion: (Switzerland) Martina Hingis
- Runner-up: (United States) Lindsay Davenport
- Score: 6–3, 4–6, 7–5

Details
- Draw: 28
- Seeds: 8

Events
Singles	men	women
Doubles	men	women
- Sydney International

Amélie Mauresmo was the defending champion but withdrew from her semifinal match against Lindsay Davenport.

Martina Hingis won in the final 6–3, 4–6, 7–5 against Davenport.

== Seeds ==
A champion seed is indicated in bold text while text in italics indicates the round in which that seed was eliminated. The top four seeds received a bye to the second round.

1. (Switzerland) **Martina Hingis (champion)**
2. (United States) Lindsay Davenport (final)
3. (United States) Monica Seles (quarterfinals)
4. (Spain) Conchita Martínez (semifinals)
5. (United States) Serena Williams (quarterfinals)
6. (Russia) Anna Kournikova (second round)
7. (South Africa) Amanda Coetzer (second round)
8. (United States) Jennifer Capriati (second round)

== Draw ==
Key

- Q = Qualifier
- WC = Wild card
- LL = Lucky loser
- Alt = Alternate
- ITF = ITF entry
- PR = Protected ranking
- SR = Special ranking
- SE = Special exempt
- JE = Junior exempt
- JR = Junior Accelerator Programme entrant
- CO = College Accelerator Programme entrant
- NG = Next Gen Accelerator Program entrant
- w/o = Walkover
- r = Retired
- d = Defaulted

=== Final ===
Final
1	(Switzerland) **Martina Hingis**	**6**	4	**7**
2	(United States) Lindsay Davenport	3	**6**	5

=== Top half ===
First round
(Belgium) **K Clijsters**	**6**	**6**
Q	(Slovenia) T Pisnik	3	1
Q	(United States) **B Rippner**	**6**	6^{4}	**6**
(Thailand) T Tanasugarn	0	**7^{7}**	3
(United States) L Osterloh	3	6^{6}
5	(United States) **S Williams**	**6**	**7^{8}**
WC	(Australia) **A Molik**	**6**	**7^{7}**
(United States) M Shaughnessy	1	6^{1}
(United States) **C Morariu**	**6**	**6**
(Italy) T Garbin	2	2
Q	(Russia) E Bovina	4	4
6	(Russia) **A Kournikova**	**6**	**6**

Second round
1	(Switzerland) **M Hingis**	**6**	**6**
(Belgium) K Clijsters	4	4
Q	(United States) B Rippner	1	2
5	(United States) **S Williams**	**6**	**6**
4	(Spain) **C Martínez**	**6**	6^{8}	**6**
WC	(Australia) A Molik	4	**7^{10}**	3
(United States) **C Morariu**	**6**	**6**
6	(Russia) A Kournikova	2	1

Quarterfinals
1	(Switzerland) **M Hingis**	**6**	**7**
5	(United States) S Williams	4	5
4	(Spain) **C Martínez**	**6**	**6**
(United States) C Morariu	4	0

Semifinals
1	(Switzerland) **M Hingis**	**6**	**6**
4	(Spain) C Martínez	4	0

=== Bottom half ===
First round
7	(South Africa) **A Coetzer**	3	**6**	**6**
(Czech Republic) D Chládková	**6**	2	2
(Luxembourg) A Kremer	1	4
(France) **A Mauresmo**	**6**	**6**
(Australia) **N Pratt**	3	**6**	**6**
WC	(Australia) E Dominikovic	**6**	4	1
8	(United States) **J Capriati**	**6**	3	**6**
(Russia) T Panova	4	**6**	1
Q	(Russia) N Petrova	2	1
(United States) **L Raymond**	**6**	**6**
(Spain) G León García	2	4
(Austria) **B Schett**	**6**	**6**

Second round
7	(South Africa) A Coetzer	5	5
(France) **A Mauresmo**	**7**	**7**
(Australia) N Pratt	4	2
WC/3	(United States) **M Seles**	**6**	**6**
8	(United States) J Capriati	**6**	3	5
(United States) **L Raymond**	2	**6**	**7**
(Austria) B Schett	3	3
2	(United States) **L Davenport**	**6**	**6**

Quarterfinals
(France) **A Mauresmo**	**6**	**7^{7}**
WC/3	(United States) M Seles	4	6^{5}
(United States) L Raymond	5	4
2	(United States) **L Davenport**	**7**	**6**

Semifinals
(France) A Mauresmo
2	(United States) **L Davenport**	w/o

== Qualifying ==
=== Seeds ===
1. (Russia) **Nadia Petrova (Qualifier)**
2. n/a
3. (United States) **Brie Rippner (Qualifier)**
4. (Slovenia) **Tina Pisnik (Qualifier)**
5. (Italy) Maria Elena Camerin (first round)
6. (United States) Alexandra Stevenson (first round)
7. (Spain) Cristina Torrens Valero (first round)
8. n/a

=== Qualifiers ===
1. **(Russia) Nadia Petrova**
2. **(Russia) Elena Bovina**
3. **(United States) Brie Rippner**
4. **(Slovenia) Tina Pisnik**

=== Draw ===
==== First qualifier ====
First round
1	(Russia) **Nadia Petrova**	**6**	**6**
(Bulgaria) Lubomira Bacheva	3	2
WC	(Australia) Jenny Belobrajdic	3	**6**	3
(France) **Émilie Loit**	**6**	1	**6**
WC	(Australia) **Bryanne Stewart**	**7**	**6**
(Italy) Antonella Serra Zanetti	5	2
(Slovakia) **Martina Suchá**	**6**	**6**
7	(Spain) Cristina Torrens Valero	3	4

Second round
1	(Russia) **Nadia Petrova**	**6**	4	**7**
(France) Émilie Loit	2	**6**	5
WC	(Australia) **Bryanne Stewart**	**7**	**6**
(Slovakia) Martina Suchá	5	2

Final Round
1	(Russia) **Nadia Petrova**	**6**	**6**
WC	(Australia) Bryanne Stewart	4	3

==== Second qualifier ====
First round
Alt	(Canada) Marie-Ève Pelletier	6^{0}	2
(Germany) **Andrea Glass**	**7^{7}**	**6**
(Croatia) Jelena Kostanić	4	3
(Russia) **Elena Bovina**	**6**	**6**
(Canada) Renata Kolbovic	2	**6**	6^{5}
(Czech Republic) **Alena Vašková**	**6**	1	**7^{7}**
(Germany) **Bianka Lamade**	**6**	**6**
6	(United States) Alexandra Stevenson	1	4

Second round
(Germany) Andrea Glass	**6**	5	4
(Russia) **Elena Bovina**	4	**7**	**6**
(Czech Republic) **Alena Vašková**	**7^{7}**	3	**6**
(Germany) Bianka Lamade	6^{5}	**6**	2

Final Round
(Russia) **Elena Bovina**	**6**	5	**6**
(Czech Republic) Alena Vašková	1	**7**	1

==== Third qualifier ====
First round
3	(United States) **Brie Rippner**	**6**	**6**
(Slovakia) Daniela Hantuchová	2	4
WC	(Australia) Trudi Musgrave	3	1
(Federal Republic of Yugoslavia) **Sandra Načuk**	**6**	**6**
(Croatia) Maja Palaveršić	5	3
(United States) **Erika deLone**	**7**	**6**
(United Kingdom) **Louise Latimer**	**6**	**6**
Alt	(Italy) Alice Canepa	4	3

Second round
3	(United States) **Brie Rippner**	**6**	**6**
(Federal Republic of Yugoslavia) Sandra Načuk	4	4
(United States) **Erika deLone**	**6**	**6**
(United Kingdom) Louise Latimer	4	2

Final Round
3	(United States) **Brie Rippner**	**6**	6^{4}	**7**
(United States) Erika deLone	3	**7^{7}**	5

==== Fourth qualifier ====
First round
4	(Slovenia) **Tina Pisnik**	**6**	**6**
(Argentina) Mariana Díaz Oliva	2	3
(Federal Republic of Yugoslavia) **Dragana Zarić**	**6**	3	**6**
WC	(Australia) Jaslyn Hewitt	4	**6**	1
(Germany) Vanessa Henke	6^{2}	**6**	6^{4}
(Germany) **Angelika Bachmann**	**7^{7}**	4	**7^{7}**
(Venezuela) **María Vento**	**6**	**6**
5	(Italy) Maria Elena Camerin	2	3

Second round
4	(Slovenia) **Tina Pisnik**	**6**	**6**
(Federal Republic of Yugoslavia) Dragana Zarić	4	3
(Germany) Angelika Bachmann	6^{3}	1
(Venezuela) **María Vento**	**7^{7}**	**6**

Final Round
4	(Slovenia) **Tina Pisnik**	**6**	3	**6**
(Venezuela) María Vento	0	**6**	1
