= 2001 Adidas International – Women's doubles =

Women's doubles
- 2001 Adidas International

Final
- Champions: (Russia) Anna Kournikova (Austria) Barbara Schett
- Runners-up: (United States) Lisa Raymond (Australia) Rennae Stubbs
- Score: 6–2, 7–5

Events
Singles	men	women
Doubles	men	women
- Sydney International

Julie Halard-Decugis and Ai Sugiyama were the defending champions but did not compete that year.

Anna Kournikova and Barbara Schett won in the final 6–2, 7–5 against Lisa Raymond and Rennae Stubbs.

== Seeds ==
Champion seeds are indicated in bold text while text in italics indicates the round in which those seeds were eliminated.

1. (United States) Lisa Raymond / (Australia) Rennae Stubbs (final)
2. (Russia) **Anna Kournikova** / (Austria) **Barbara Schett (champions)**
3. (United States) Lindsay Davenport / (United States) Corina Morariu (quarterfinals)
4. (South Africa) Amanda Coetzer / (United States) Kimberly Po (semifinals)

== Draw ==
Key

- Q = Qualifier
- WC = Wild card
- LL = Lucky loser
- Alt = Alternate
- ITF = ITF entry
- PR = Protected ranking
- SR = Special ranking
- SE = Special exempt
- JE = Junior exempt
- JR = Junior Accelerator Programme entrant
- CO = College Accelerator Programme entrant
- NG = Next Gen Accelerator Program entrant
- w/o = Walkover
- r = Retired
- d = Defaulted

First round
1	(United States) **L Raymond** (Australia) **R Stubbs**	**6**	**6**
Q	(Australia) T Musgrave (Australia) B Stewart	3	4
(Bulgaria) **L Bacheva** (Spain) **C Torrens Valero**	**6**	**6**
(Slovakia) J Husárová (Federal Republic of Yugoslavia) S Načuk	4	4
3	(United States) **L Davenport** (United States) **C Morariu**	**6**	**6**
(France) É Loit (France) A Mauresmo	2	2
(Switzerland) **M Hingis** (United States) **M Seles**	**6**	3	**7^{7}**
WC	(United States) S Williams (United States) V Williams	4	**6**	6^{2}
(Italy) **S Farina Elia** (Italy) **T Garbin**	**7**	**6**
(Spain) C Martínez (Argentina) P Tarabini	5	3
(Belgium) K Clijsters (Australia) A Molik	1	6^{1}
4	(South Africa) **A Coetzer** (United States) **K Po**	**6**	**7^{7}**
(Australia) **N Pratt** (United States) **M Shaughnessy**	**6**	5	**7**
(Indonesia) Y Basuki (Netherlands) C Vis	3	**7**	5
(United States) E deLone (Croatia) J Kostanić	1	2
2	(Russia) **A Kournikova** (Austria) **B Schett**	**6**	**6**

Quarterfinals
1	(United States) **L Raymond** (Australia) **R Stubbs**	**6**	**6**
(Bulgaria) L Bacheva (Spain) C Torrens Valero	1	4
3	(United States) L Davenport (United States) C Morariu	5	3
(Switzerland) **M Hingis** (United States) **M Seles**	**7**	**6**
(Italy) S Farina Elia (Italy) T Garbin	1	5
4	(South Africa) **A Coetzer** (United States) **K Po**	**6**	**7**
(Australia) N Pratt (United States) M Shaughnessy	2	**6**	5
2	(Russia) **A Kournikova** (Austria) **B Schett**	**6**	4	**7**

Semifinals
1	(United States) **L Raymond** (Australia) **R Stubbs**	w/o
(Switzerland) M Hingis (United States) M Seles
4	(South Africa) A Coetzer (United States) K Po	2	4
2	(Russia) **A Kournikova** (Austria) **B Schett**	**6**	**6**

Final
1	(United States) Lisa Raymond (Australia) Rennae Stubbs	2	5
2	(Russia) **Anna Kournikova** (Austria) **Barbara Schett**	**6**	**7**

== Qualifying ==
=== Seeds ===
Both seeded teams received byes to the second round.

1. (Australia) **Trudi Musgrave** / (Australia) **Bryanne Stewart (Qualifiers)**
2. (Argentina) Mariana Díaz Oliva / (Venezuela) María Vento (second round)

=== Qualifiers ===
1. **(Australia) Trudi Musgrave / (Australia) Bryanne Stewart**

==== Draw ====
- NB: The first two rounds used the pro set format.

First round		Second round			Final Round
		1	(Australia) **Trudi Musgrave** (Australia) **Bryanne Stewart**	**8**
(Russia) Elena Bovina (Russia) Tatiana Panova	5		(Slovakia) Daniela Hantuchová (United States) Lilia Osterloh	6
(Slovakia) **Daniela Hantuchová** (United States) **Lilia Osterloh**	**8**				1	(Australia) **Trudi Musgrave** (Australia) **Bryanne Stewart**	**6**	**6**
(Croatia) Maja Palaveršić (Federal Republic of Yugoslavia) Dragana Zarić	5					(Australia) Evie Dominikovic (United States) Brie Rippner	0	2
(Australia) **Evie Dominikovic** (United States) **Brie Rippner**	**8**		(Australia) **Evie Dominikovic** (United States) **Brie Rippner**	**9**
		2	(Argentina) Mariana Díaz Oliva (Venezuela) María Vento	7
