= 1992 NSW Open =

- Date: 6–12 January
- Edition: 100th
- Category: World Series; Tier III
- Surface: Hard / outdoor
- Location: Sydney, Australia
- Venue: White City Stadium

Champions

Men's singles
- (Spain) Emilio Sánchez

Women's singles
- (Argentina) Gabriela Sabatini

Men's doubles
- (Spain) Sergio Casal / (Spain) Jason Stoltenberg

Women's doubles
- (Spain) Arantxa Sánchez Vicario / (Czechoslovakia) Helena Suková
- Sydney International

The 1992 NSW Open was a combined men's and women's tennis tournament played on outdoor hard courts at the White City Stadium in Sydney, Australia that was part of the World Series of the 1992 ATP Tour and Tier II of the 1992 WTA Tour. It was the 100th edition of the tournament and was held from 6 January through 12 January 1994. Emilio Sánchez and Gabriela Sabatini won the singles titles.

== Finals ==
=== Men's singles ===
(Spain) Emilio Sánchez defeated (France) Guy Forget, 6–3, 6–4

=== Women's singles ===
(Argentina) Gabriela Sabatini defeated (Spain) Arantxa Sánchez Vicario, 6–1, 6–1

=== Men's doubles ===
(Spain) Sergio Casal / (Spain) Emilio Sánchez defeated (United States) Scott Davis / (United States) Kelly Jones, 3–6, 6–1, 6–4

=== Women's doubles ===
(Spain) Arantxa Sánchez Vicario / (Czechoslovakia) Helena Suková defeated (United States) Mary Joe Fernández / (United States) Zina Garrison, 7–6^{(7–4)}, 6–7^{(4–7)}, 6–2
