= 1989 New South Wales Open – Men's singles =

Men's singles
- 1989 New South Wales Open
- 1988 Champion: (Australia) John Fitzgerald

Final
- Champion: (United States) Aaron Krickstein
- Runner-up: (Soviet Union) Andrei Cherkasov
- Score: 6–4, 6–2

Details
- Draw: 32
- Seeds: 8

Events
Singles	men	women
Doubles	men	women
← 1988 ·	New South Wales Open	· 1990 →

John Fitzgerald was the defending champion but did not compete that year.

Aaron Krickstein won in the final 6–4, 6–2 against Andrei Cherkasov.

== Seeds ==
A champion seed is indicated in bold text while text in italics indicates the round in which that seed was eliminated.

1. (France) Henri Leconte (first round)
2. (Soviet Union) Andrei Chesnokov (first round)
3. (United States) **Aaron Krickstein (champion)**
4. (Sweden) Jonas Svensson (first round)
5. (Australia) Darren Cahill (first round)
6. (South Africa) Christo van Rensburg (quarterfinals)
7. (Australia) Wally Masur (quarterfinals)
8. (Sweden) Magnus Gustafsson (second round)

== Draw ==
=== Key ===
- Q = Qualifier
- WC = Wild card
- LL = Lucky loser
- Alt = Alternate
- ITF = ITF entry
- PR = Protected ranking
- SR = Special ranking
- SE = Special exempt
- JE = Junior exempt
- JR = Junior Accelerator Programme entrant
- CO = College Accelerator Programme entrant
- NG = Next Gen Accelerator Program entrant
- w/o = Walkover
- r = Retired
- d = Defaulted

First round
1	(France) H Leconte	4	3
(Sweden) **P Lundgren**	**6**	**6**
(Sweden) J Nyström	4	0
(Socialist Federal Republic of Yugoslavia) **B Orešar**	**6**	**6**
(France) **T Tulasne**	**6**	**7**
(Italy) D Nargiso	4	6
(West Germany) P Kühnen	3	**7**	4
7	(Australia) **W Masur**	**6**	5	**6**
3	(United States) **A Krickstein**	**6**	6	**6**
(South Africa) P Aldrich	3	**7**	2
(United States) **J Rive**	**6**	**7**
WC	(Australia) P Doohan	4	6
(United States) **M Davis**	**6**	**7**
(United States) G Layendecker	4	6
(West Germany) **C-U Steeb**	**6**	4	**6**
5	(Australia) D Cahill	3	**6**	1
6	(South Africa) **C van Rensburg**	**6**	**7**
(Soviet Union) A Olhovskiy	3	6
Q	(South Africa) B Talbot	2	3
(Soviet Union) **A Volkov**	**6**	**6**
(Australia) J Frawley	5	**6**	2
(Australia) **J Stoltenberg**	**7**	4	**6**
Q	(France) **O Delaître**	**6**	**6**
4	(Sweden) J Svensson	2	4
8	(Sweden) **M Gustafsson**	**6**	**6**
Q	(West Germany) A Mronz	2	2
(Sweden) J Gunnarsson	**6**	4	3
Q	(Czechoslovakia) **L Němeček**	3	**6**	**6**
(Mexico) L Lavalle	4	1
WC	(Soviet Union) **A Cherkasov**	**6**	**6**
(West Germany) **C Saceanu**	4	**6**	**6**
2	(Soviet Union) A Chesnokov	**6**	4	4

Second round
(Sweden) P Lundgren	**6**	6	2
(Socialist Federal Republic of Yugoslavia) **B Orešar**	2	**7**	**6**
(France) T Tulasne	5	2
7	(Australia) **W Masur**	**7**	**6**
3	(United States) **A Krickstein**	**6**	**6**
(United States) J Rive	3	4
(United States) M Davis	5	3
(West Germany) **C-U Steeb**	**7**	**6**
6	(South Africa) **C van Rensburg**	**7**	**7**
(Soviet Union) A Volkov	6	6
(Australia) J Stoltenberg	6	2
Q	(France) **O Delaître**	**7**	**6**
8	(Sweden) M Gustafsson	**6**	1	1
Q	(Czechoslovakia) **L Němeček**	3	**6**	**6**
WC	(Soviet Union) **A Cherkasov**	**6**	**6**
(West Germany) C Saceanu	3	3

Quarterfinals
(Socialist Federal Republic of Yugoslavia) **B Orešar**	**7**	**6**
7	(Australia) W Masur	5	4
3	(United States) **A Krickstein**	2	**6**	**6**
(West Germany) C-U Steeb	**6**	3	3
6	(South Africa) C van Rensburg	5	3
Q	(France) **O Delaître**	**7**	**6**
Q	(Czechoslovakia) L Němeček	1	3
WC	(Soviet Union) **A Cherkasov**	**6**	**6**

Semifinals
(Socialist Federal Republic of Yugoslavia) B Orešar	0	**6**	4
3	(United States) **A Krickstein**	**6**	2	**6**
Q	(France) O Delaître	5	1
WC	(Soviet Union) **A Cherkasov**	**7**	**6**

Final
3	(United States) **Aaron Krickstein**	**6**	**6**
WC	(Soviet Union) Andrei Cherkasov	4	2
