= 1988 New South Wales Open – Men's singles =

Men's singles
- 1988 New South Wales Open

Final
- Champion: (Australia) John Fitzgerald
- Runner-up: (Soviet Union) Andrei Chesnokov
- Score: 6–3, 6–4

Details
- Draw: 32 (3WC/4Q/1SE)
- Seeds: 8

Events
Singles	men	women
Doubles	men	women
← 1987 ·	Sydney International	· 1989 →

Miloslav Mečíř was the defending champion, but did not compete this year.

John Fitzgerald won the title by defeating Andrei Chesnokov 6–3, 6–4 in the final.

== Seeds ==
1. (South Africa) Christo van Rensburg (semifinals)
2. (Australia) Wally Masur (first round)
3. (Soviet Union) Andrei Chesnokov (final)
4. (Australia) Peter Doohan (second round)
5. (Australia) John Fitzgerald (champion)
6. (Australia) Darren Cahill (quarterfinals)
7. (United States) Joey Rive (semifinals)
8. (Netherlands) Tom Nijssen (first round)

== Draw ==
=== Key ===
- Q = Qualifier
- WC = Wild card
- LL = Lucky loser
- Alt = Alternate
- SE = Special exempt
- PR = Protected ranking
- ITF = ITF entry
- JE = Junior exempt
- w/o = Walkover
- r = Retired
- d = Defaulted
- SR = Special ranking

=== Finals ===
Semifinals
1/WC	(South Africa) Christo van Rensburg	3	6
3	(Soviet Union) Andrei Chesnokov	6	7
5	(Australia) John Fitzgerald	6	3	6
7	(United States) Joey Rive	4	6	1

Final
3	(Soviet Union) Andrei Chesnokov	3	4
5	(Australia) John Fitzgerald	6	6

=== Top half ===
First round
1/WC	(South Africa) C van Rensburg	7	6
SE	(Australia) J Anderson	5	3
(France) J Potier	6	4
(Australia) S Youl	7	6
(Soviet Union) A Volkov	7	7
(United States) R Leach	6	5
(Italy) M Narducci	4	6	6
8	(Netherlands) T Nijssen	6	4	4
3	(Soviet Union) A Chesnokov	6	6
(South Africa) D Visser	3	3
(Canada) C Pridham	7	7
(Nigeria) T Mmoh	6	6
(United Kingdom) A Castle	6	7
(Argentina) R Saad	2	6
Q	(United States) P Chamberlin	3	6	3
6	(Australia) D Cahill	6	4	6

Second round
1/WC	(South Africa) C van Rensburg	6	6
(Australia) S Youl	4	3
(Soviet Union) A Volkov	6	3
(Italy) M Narducci	1	0^{r}
3	(Soviet Union) A Chesnokov	6	7
(Canada) C Pridham	2	5
(United Kingdom) A Castle	6	3
6	(Australia) D Cahill	7	6

Quarterfinals
1/WC	(South Africa) C van Rensburg	6	4	7
(Soviet Union) A Volkov	0	6	5
3	(Soviet Union) A Chesnokov	6	7
6	(Australia) D Cahill	3	5

Semifinals
1/WC	(South Africa) C van Rensburg	3	6
3	(Soviet Union) A Chesnokov	6	7

=== Bottom half ===
First round
5	(Australia) J Fitzgerald	3	7	6
Q	(United States) R Schmidt	6	5	3
Q	(South Africa) E Edwards	4	3
(The Bahamas) R Smith	6	6
WC	(Australia) T Woodbridge	3	1
(South Africa) B Moir	6	6
(Italy) G Pozzi	6	7	3
4	(Australia) P Doohan	7	6	6
7	(United States) J Rive	7	7
(United Kingdom) S Shaw	6	6
Q	(Soviet Union) A Olhovskiy	6	7
(Netherlands) H van Boeckel	2	5
WC	(Australia) J Stoltenberg	4	6
(Australia) B Drewett	6	7
(United States) M Flur	6	6
2	(Australia) W Masur	4	4

Second round
5	(Australia) J Fitzgerald	3	7	6
(The Bahamas) R Smith	6	6	2
(South Africa) B Moir	7	6
4	(Australia) P Doohan	5	4
7	(United States) J Rive	6	6	7
Q	(Soviet Union) A Olhovskiy	2	7	6
(Australia) B Drewett	6	6
(United States) M Flur	2	4

Quarterfinals
5	(Australia) J Fitzgerald	6	6
(South Africa) B Moir	0	1
7	(United States) J Rive	6	6
(Australia) B Drewett	4	2

Semifinals
5	(Australia) J Fitzgerald	6	3	6
7	(United States) J Rive	4	6	1
