= 1987 Family Circle NSW Open – Doubles =

Doubles
- 1987 Family Circle NSW Open

Final
- Champions: (United States) Betsy Nagelsen (Australia) Elizabeth Smylie
- Runners-up: (Australia) Jenny Byrne (Australia) Janine Tremelling
- Score: 6–7^{(5–7)}, 7–5, 6–1

Details
- Draw: 32
- Seeds: 8

Events
Singles	Doubles
← 1985 ·	Sydney International	· 1988 →

Hana Mandlíková and Wendy Turnbull were the defending champions in 1985. They lost in the quarterfinals to Zina Garrison and Lori McNeil.

Betsy Nagelsen and Elizabeth Smylie won the title by defeating Jenny Byrne and Janine Tremelling 6–7^{(5–7)}, 7–5, 6–1 in the final.

== Seeds ==
1. (West Germany) Claudia Kohde-Kilsch / (Czechoslovakia) Helena Suková (quarterfinals)
2. (Czechoslovakia) Hana Mandlíková / (Australia) Wendy Turnbull (quarterfinals)
3. (United States) Betsy Nagelsen / (Australia) Elizabeth Smylie (champions)
4. (United States) Elise Burgin / (South Africa) Rosalyn Fairbank (quarterfinals)
5. (United States) Gigi Fernández / (United States) Robin White (semifinals)
6. (United States) Zina Garrison / (United States) Lori McNeil (semifinals)
7. (United States) Alycia Moulton / (United States) Molly Van Nostrand (first round)
8. (Canada) Carling Bassett / (United States) Anne Smith (second round)

== Draw ==
=== Key ===
- Q = Qualifier
- WC = Wild card
- LL = Lucky loser
- Alt = Alternate
- SE = Special exempt
- PR = Protected ranking
- ITF = ITF entry
- JE = Junior exempt
- w/o = Walkover
- r = Retired
- d = Defaulted
- SR = Special ranking

=== Finals ===
Semifinals
(Australia) Jenny Byrne (Australia) Janine Tremelling	3	6	6
5	(United States) Gigi Fernández (United States) Robin White	6	4	4
3	(United States) Betsy Nagelsen (Australia) Elizabeth Smylie	6	6
6	(United States) Zina Garrison (United States) Lori McNeil	3	4

Final
(Australia) Jenny Byrne (Australia) Janine Tremelling	7^{7}	5	1
3	(United States) Betsy Nagelsen (Australia) Elizabeth Smylie	6^{5}	7	6

=== Top half ===
First round
1	(West Germany) C Kohde-Kilsch (Czechoslovakia) H Suková	6	6
(United States) A Henricksson (Sweden) C Karlsson	3	2
(United States) Ca MacGregor (United States) Cy MacGregor	4	4
(Australia) R Bryant (Australia) A Tobin-Dingwall	6	6
(Netherlands) C Bakkum (Netherlands) M van der Torre	7	6
(Czechoslovakia) A Holíková (West Germany) M Schropp	6	2
(Australia) J Byrne (Australia) J Tremelling	7	6
7	(United States) A Moulton (United States) M Van Nostrand	6	3
4	(United States) E Burgin (South Africa) R Fairbank	7	3	6
(United Kingdom) J Durie (United Kingdom) A Hobbs	6	6	4
(Australia) M Jaggard (Australia) L O'Neill	4	5
(United States) L Antonoplis (Brazil) C Monteiro	6	7
(United States) H Na (Japan) M Yanagi	6	5	4
(Switzerland) C Jolissaint (United States) H Ludloff	4	7	6
(Switzerland) C Bartos-Csepery (United Kingdom) S Gomer	0	6
5	(United States) G Fernández (United States) R White	6	7

Second round
1	(West Germany) C Kohde-Kilsch (Czechoslovakia) H Suková	6	6
(Australia) R Bryant (Australia) A Tobin-Dingwall	2	2
(Netherlands) C Bakkum (Netherlands) M van der Torre	7	2	3
(Australia) J Byrne (Australia) J Tremelling	5	6	6
4	(United States) E Burgin (South Africa) R Fairbank	6	6
(United States) L Antonoplis (Brazil) C Monteiro	1	4
(Switzerland) C Jolissaint (United States) H Ludloff	6	6
5	(United States) G Fernández (United States) R White	7	7

Quarterfinals
1	(West Germany) C Kohde-Kilsch (Czechoslovakia) H Suková	5	5
(Australia) J Byrne (Australia) J Tremelling	7	7
4	(United States) E Burgin (South Africa) R Fairbank	2	3
5	(United States) G Fernández (United States) R White	6	6

Semifinals
(Australia) J Byrne (Australia) J Tremelling	3	6	6
5	(United States) G Fernández (United States) R White	6	4	4

=== Bottom half ===
First round
8	(Canada) C Bassett (United States) A Smith	7	6
(Sweden) C Lindqvist (West Germany) E Pfaff	6	0
(West Germany) A Betzner (West Germany) C Singer	7	6
(Australia) A Minter (Australia) E Minter	6	2
(New Zealand) B Cordwell (Australia) L Field	6	6	6
(United States) C Benjamin (South Africa) D van Rensburg	4	7	3
(United States) L Allen (South Africa) E Reinach	2	6
3	(United States) B Nagelsen (Australia) E Smylie	6	7
6	(United States) Z Garrison (United States) L McNeil	6	6
(United States) AM Fernandez (New Zealand) J Richardson	1	4
(United States) G Magers (South Africa) J Mundel	7	4	6
(United States) T Holladay (United States) P Smith	5	6	2
(Australia) C Carney (Japan) A Kijimuta	5	5
(Netherlands) M Bollegraf (Canada) H Kelesi	7	7
(United States) S Collins (United States) S Walsh-Pete	5	6
2	(Czechoslovakia) H Mandlíková (Australia) W Turnbull	7	7

Second round
8	(Canada) C Bassett (United States) A Smith	4	4
(West Germany) A Betzner (West Germany) C Singer	6	6
(New Zealand) B Cordwell (Australia) L Field	4	7	5
3	(United States) B Nagelsen (Australia) E Smylie	6	6	7
6	(United States) Z Garrison (United States) L McNeil	7	6
(United States) G Magers (South Africa) J Mundel	6	2
(Netherlands) M Bollegraf (Canada) H Kelesi	1	2
2	(Czechoslovakia) H Mandlíková (Australia) W Turnbull	6	6

Quarterfinals
(West Germany) A Betzner (West Germany) C Singer	1	6
3	(United States) B Nagelsen (Australia) E Smylie	6	7
6	(United States) Z Garrison (United States) L McNeil	6	6
2	(Czechoslovakia) H Mandlíková (Australia) W Turnbull	2	4

Semifinals
3	(United States) B Nagelsen (Australia) E Smylie	6	6
6	(United States) Z Garrison (United States) L McNeil	3	4
