= 1988 New South Wales Open – Men's doubles =

Men's doubles
- 1988 New South Wales Open

Final
- Champions: (Australia) Darren Cahill (Australia) Mark Kratzmann
- Runners-up: (United States) Joey Rive (United States) Bud Schultz
- Score: 7–6, 6–4

Details
- Draw: 16
- Seeds: 4

Events
Singles	men	women
Doubles	men	women
← 1987 ·	Sydney International	· 1989 →

Brad Drewett and Mark Edmondson were the defending champions, but lost in the semifinals to Darren Cahill and Mark Kratzmann.

Cahill and Kratzmann won the title by defeating Joey Rive and Bud Schultz 7–6, 6–4 in the final.

== Seeds ==
1. (Australia) Peter Doohan / (United States) Rick Leach (first round)
2. (Australia) Darren Cahill / (Australia) Mark Kratzmann (champions)
3. (Netherlands) Tom Nijssen / (Netherlands) Huub van Boeckel (first round)
4. (Australia) David Macpherson / (Australia) Simon Youl (quarterfinals)

== Draw ==
=== Key ===
- Q = Qualifier
- WC = Wild card
- LL = Lucky loser
- Alt = Alternate
- SE = Special exempt
- PR = Protected ranking
- ITF = ITF entry
- JE = Junior exempt
- w/o = Walkover
- r = Retired
- d = Defaulted
- SR = Special ranking

=== Draw ===
First round
1	(Australia) P Doohan (United States) R Leach	6	3
(Nigeria) T Mmoh (The Bahamas) R Smith	7	6
(West Germany) S Heckmanns (Australia) Anthony Spartalis	4	4
(United States) J Rive (United States) B Schultz	6	6
3	(Netherlands) T Nijssen (Netherlands) H van Boeckel	2	2
(United States) M Bauer (United States) P Chamberlin	6	6
(United States) B Buffington (Sweden) S Svensson	4	4
(United States) M Flur (United States) T Siegel	6	6
(Australia) B Drewett (Australia) M Edmondson	4	6	6
(Australia) J Stoltenberg (Australia) T Woodbridge	6	2	4
(South Africa) B Moir (Italy) G Pozzi	4	6
4	(Australia) D Macpherson (Australia) S Youl	6	7
(Australia) A Anderson (Australia) C Turich	6	7
(United States) B Cox (United States) H Pfister	3	5
(Australia) S Barr (Australia) K Warwick	6	6	2
2	(Australia) D Cahill (Australia) M Kratzmann	4	7	6

Quarterfinals
(Nigeria) T Mmoh (The Bahamas) R Smith	3	7	3
(United States) J Rive (United States) B Schultz	6	6	6
(United States) M Bauer (United States) P Chamberlin	6	3	5
(United States) M Flur (United States) T Siegel	4	6	7
(Australia) B Drewett (Australia) M Edmondson	7	6
4	(Australia) D Macpherson (Australia) S Youl	6	4
(Australia) A Anderson (Australia) C Turich	4	3
2	(Australia) D Cahill (Australia) M Kratzmann	6	6

Semifinals
(United States) J Rive (United States) B Schultz	7	6
(United States) M Flur (United States) T Siegel	6	3
(Australia) B Drewett (Australia) M Edmondson	6	4
2	(Australia) D Cahill (Australia) M Kratzmann	7	6

Final
(United States) J Rive (United States) B Schultz	6	4
2	(Australia) D Cahill (Australia) M Kratzmann	7	6
