= 1990 Holden NSW Open – Women's singles =

Women's singles
- 1990 Holden NSW Open

Final
- Champion: (Soviet Union) Natasha Zvereva
- Runner-up: (Austria) Barbara Paulus
- Score: 4–6, 6–1, 6–3

Details
- Draw: 56 (3WC/8Q)
- Seeds: 16

Events
Singles	men	women
Doubles	men	women
← 1989 ·	Sydney International	· 1991 →

Martina Navratilova was the defending champion, but did not compete this year.

Natasha Zvereva won the title by defeating Barbara Paulus 4–6, 6–1, 6–3 in the final.

== Seeds ==
The top eight seeds received a bye to the second round.

1. (Czechoslovakia) Helena Suková (third round)
2. (Czechoslovakia) Jana Novotná (third round)
3. (Canada) Helen Kelesi (second round)
4. (Australia) Hana Mandlíková (third round)
5. (United States) Pam Shriver (second round)
6. (Soviet Union) Larisa Savchenko (second round)
7. (Italy) Raffaella Reggi (quarterfinals)
8. (South Africa) Rosalyn Fairbank (second round)
9. (United States) Gigi Fernández (third round)
10. (Austria) Barbara Paulus (final)
11. (Soviet Union) Natasha Zvereva (champion)
12. (United States) Patty Fendick (first round)
13. (Czechoslovakia) Radka Zrubáková (quarterfinals)
14. (United States) Amy Frazier (semifinals)
15. (Australia) Anne Minter (first round)
16. (Austria) Judith Wiesner (semifinals)

== Draw ==
=== Key ===
- Q = Qualifier
- WC = Wild card
- LL = Lucky loser
- Alt = Alternate
- SE = Special exempt
- PR = Protected ranking
- ITF = ITF entry
- JE = Junior exempt
- w/o = Walkover
- r = Retired
- d = Defaulted
- SR = Special ranking

=== Finals ===
Quarterfinals
13	(Czechoslovakia) Radka Zrubáková	2	1
10	(Austria) Barbara Paulus	6	6
16	(Austria) Judith Wiesner	6	4	6
(West Germany) Claudia Porwik	3	6	3
Q	(France) Julie Halard	6	2	4
11	(Soviet Union) Natasha Zvereva	4	6	6
7	(Italy) Raffaella Reggi	3	5
14	(United States) Amy Frazier	6	7

Semifinals
10	(Austria) Barbara Paulus	6	3	6
16	(Austria) Judith Wiesner	4	6	1
11	(Soviet Union) Natasha Zvereva	6	2	6
14	(United States) Amy Frazier	3	6	2

Final
10	(Austria) Barbara Paulus	6	1	3
11	(Soviet Union) Natasha Zvereva	4	6	6

=== Top half ===
==== Section 1 ====
First round
(United States) A Grossman	6	6
WC	(Australia) M Jaggard	0	4
(United States) A Henricksson	3	7	6
Q	(Japan) A Nishiya	6	5	2
Q	(South Africa) D Van Rensburg	1	0
13	(Czechoslovakia) R Zrubáková	6	6
10	(Austria) B Paulus	5	6	6
(United States) C Cunningham	7	1	4
(Australia) JA Faull	3	2
(Netherlands) B Schultz	6	6
(Australia) N Provis	6	6
(France) C Tanvier	0	3

Second round
1	(Czechoslovakia) H Suková	6	6
(United States) A Grossman	2	4
(United States) A Henricksson	3	6	6^{6}
13	(Czechoslovakia) R Zrubáková	6	2	7^{8}
10	(Austria) B Paulus	7^{7}	6^{6}	6
(Netherlands) B Schultz	6^{3}	7^{8}	1
(Australia) N Provis	6	7^{7}
8	(South Africa) R Fairbank	2	6^{2}

Third round
1	(Czechoslovakia) H Suková	1	6	3
13	(Czechoslovakia) R Zrubáková	6	1	6
10	(Austria) B Paulus	7^{7}	6
(Australia) N Provis	6^{3}	2

Quarterfinals
13	(Czechoslovakia) R Zrubáková	2	1
10	(Austria) B Paulus	6	6

==== Section 2 ====
First round
(Australia) E Smylie	7	6^{3}	6
WC	(Australia) L Field	5	7^{7}	4
(Hungary) A Temesvári	3	2
(Netherlands) M Bollegraf	6	6
(France) K Quentrec	5	4
16	(Austria) J Wiesner	7	6
12	(United States) P Fendick	7	5	2
(West Germany) C Porwik	5	7	6
(West Germany) C Kohde-Kilsch	2	5
(United States) E Burgin	6	7
(Czechoslovakia) J Pospíšilová	7^{7}	6
(Czechoslovakia) R Rajchrtová	6^{4}	1

Second round
4	(Australia) H Mandlíková	6	6
(Australia) E Smylie	2	2
(Netherlands) M Bollegraf	3	2
16	(Austria) J Wiesner	6	6
(West Germany) C Porwik	6	6
(United States) E Burgin	3	3
(Czechoslovakia) J Pospíšilová	6	6^{6}	7
5	(United States) P Shriver	4	7^{8}	5

Third round
4	(Australia) H Mandlíková	6^{5}	3
16	(Austria) J Wiesner	7^{7}	6
(West Germany) C Porwik	6	6
(Czechoslovakia) J Pospíšilová	1	0

Quarterfinals
16	(Austria) J Wiesner	6	4	6
(West Germany) C Porwik	3	6	3

=== Bottom half ===
==== Section 3 ====
First round
(United States) L McNeil	2	6	5
Q	(France) J Halard	6	1	7
(United States) S Martin	2	6	5
(United States) T Phelps	6	0	7
(Czechoslovakia) P Langrová	6	6
15	(Australia) A Minter	4	4
11	(Soviet Union) N Zvereva	6	6
(Japan) A Kijimuta	3	1
(Italy) L Golarsa	6	6
WC	(Australia) K Radford	3	2
(United States) K Adams	2	2
(France) I Demongeot	6	6

Second round
6	(Soviet Union) L Savchenko	4	5
Q	(France) J Halard	6	7
(United States) T Phelps	5	3
(Czechoslovakia) P Langrová	7	6
11	(Soviet Union) N Zvereva	6	6
(Italy) L Golarsa	4	3
(France) I Demongeot	6	4	7^{7}
3	(Canada) H Kelesi	2	6	6^{4}

Third round
Q	(France) J Halard	6	0	6
(Czechoslovakia) P Langrová	2	6	4
11	(Soviet Union) N Zvereva	6	6
(France) I Demongeot	1	1

Quarterfinals
Q	(France) J Halard	6	2	4
11	(Soviet Union) N Zvereva	4	6	6

==== Section 4 ====
First round
(Japan) E Inoue	4	6	5
(United States) S Stafford	6	4	7
Q	(Japan) N Miyagi	4	3
Q	(United States) Ca MacGregor	6	6
(United States) H Cioffi	3	1
9	(United States) G Fernández	6	6
14	(United States) A Frazier	3	6	6
(Netherlands) N Jagerman	6	4	3
Q	(France) N Herreman	1	6	6
Q	(United States) T Whitlinger	6	3	1
Q	(United States) R White	6	2	4
(Australia) R McQuillan	4	6	6

Second round
7	(Italy) R Reggi	6	5	6
(United States) S Stafford	4	7	1
Q	(United States) Ca MacGregor	0	6	3
9	(United States) G Fernández	6	4	6
14	(United States) A Frazier	6	6
Q	(France) N Herreman	4	0
(Australia) R McQuillan	1	4
2	(Czechoslovakia) J Novotná	6	6

Third round
7	(Italy) R Reggi	6	7
9	(United States) G Fernández	1	5
14	(United States) A Frazier	6	6
2	(Czechoslovakia) J Novotná	3	4

Quarterfinals
7	(Italy) R Reggi	3	5
14	(United States) A Frazier	6	7
