= 1987 Family Circle NSW Open – Singles =

Singles
- 1987 Family Circle NSW Open

Final
- Champion: (United States) Zina Garrison
- Runner-up: (United States) Pam Shriver
- Score: 6–2, 6–4

Details
- Draw: 56 (8Q)
- Seeds: 14

Events
| Singles | Doubles |
| ← 1985 · | Sydney International | · 1988 → |

Martina Navratilova was the two-time defending champion, but did not compete this year.

Zina Garrison won the title by defeating Pam Shriver 6–2, 6–4 in the final.

== Seeds ==
The first eight seeds received a bye into the second round.

1. (Czechoslovakia) Hana Mandlíková (third round)
2. (United States) Pam Shriver (final)
3. (Czechoslovakia) Helena Suková (quarterfinals)
4. (West Germany) Claudia Kohde-Kilsch (second round)
5. (Bulgaria) Manuela Maleeva (semifinals)
6. (United States) Zina Garrison (champion)
7. (United States) Lori McNeil (quarterfinals)
8. (United States) Robin White (second round)
9. (Sweden) Catarina Lindqvist (quarterfinals)
10. (Australia) Wendy Turnbull (semifinals)
11. (Canada) Carling Bassett (first round)
12. (United Kingdom) Jo Durie (second round)
13. (Australia) Dianne Balestrat (second round, withdrew)
14. (United States) Marianne Werdel (first round)

== Draw ==
=== Key ===
- Q = Qualifier
- WC = Wild card
- LL = Lucky loser
- Alt = Alternate
- SE = Special exempt
- PR = Protected ranking
- ITF = ITF entry
- JE = Junior exempt
- w/o = Walkover
- r = Retired
- d = Defaulted
- SR = Special ranking

=== Finals ===
Quarterfinals
10 | (Australia) Wendy Turnbull | 6 | 7
7 | (United States) Lori McNeil | 4 | 5
3 | (Czechoslovakia) Helena Suková | 3 | 1
6 | (United States) Zina Garrison | 6 | 6
5 | (Bulgaria) Manuela Maleeva | 4 | 6 | 6
(Japan) Etsuko Inoue | 6 | 2 | 2
9 | (Sweden) Catarina Lindqvist | 4 | 2
2 | (United States) Pam Shriver | 6 | 6

Semifinals
10 | (Australia) Wendy Turnbull | 3 | 4
6 | (United States) Zina Garrison | 6 | 6
5 | (Bulgaria) Manuela Maleeva | 3 | 3
2 | (United States) Pam Shriver | 6 | 6

Final
6 | (United States) Zina Garrison | 6 | 6
2 | (United States) Pam Shriver | 2 | 4

=== Top half ===
==== Section 1 ====
First round
(South Africa) E Reinach | 6 | 3 | 6
(Australia) E Smylie | 2 | 6 | 3
(Australia) J Byrne | 2 | 6 | 0
(Australia) N Provis | 6 | 3 | 6
(United States) T Holladay | 1 | 1
10 | (Australia) W Turnbull | 6 | 6
13 | (Australia) D Balestrat | 6 | 7
(United States) G Fernández | 1 | 6
(United States) E Burgin | 6 | 6
(West Germany) S Hanika | 3 | 3
(West Germany) E Pfaff | 6 | 5 | 6
(United States) H Na | 0 | 7 | 3

Second round
1 | (Czechoslovakia) H Mandlíková | 6 | 6
(South Africa) E Reinach | 1 | 3
(Australia) N Provis | 1 | 6
10 | (Australia) W Turnbull | 6 | 7
13 | (Australia) D Balestrat
(United States) E Burgin | w/o
(West Germany) E Pfaff | 3 | 6 | 6
7 | (United States) L McNeil | 6 | 4 | 7

Third round
1 | (Czechoslovakia) H Mandlíková | 3 | 5
10 | (Australia) W Turnbull | 6 | 7
(United States) E Burgin | 1 | 6 | 2
7 | (United States) L McNeil | 6 | 4 | 6

Quarterfinals
10 | (Australia) W Turnbull | 6 | 7
7 | (United States) L McNeil | 4 | 5

==== Section 2 ====
First round
(West Germany) C Porwik | 4 | 7 | 1
(United States) A Henricksson | 6 | 5 | 6
Q | (West Germany) A Betzner | 5 | 4
Q | (United States) AM Fernandez | 7 | 6
Q | (United States) S Collins | 3 | 4
(Australia) E Minter | 6 | 6
12 | (United Kingdom) J Durie | 6 | 3 | 6
(Australia) M Jaggard | 3 | 6 | 4
(United States) C Benjamin | 6 | 4 | 6
(Switzerland) C Bartos-Cserepy | 4 | 6 | 2
(United States) M Van Nostrand | 6 | 6
(United States) B Bowes | 1 | 2

Second round
3 | (Czechoslovakia) H Suková | 6 | 6
(United States) A Henricksson | 1 | 2
Q | (United States) AM Fernandez | 7 | 6 | 7
(Australia) E Minter | 6 | 7 | 5
12 | (United Kingdom) J Durie | 5 | 4
(United States) C Benjamin | 7 | 6
(United States) M Van Nostrand | 3 | 2
6 | (United States) Z Garrison | 6 | 6

Third round
3 | (Czechoslovakia) H Suková | 5
Q | (United States) AM Fernandez | 3^{r}
(United States) C Benjamin | 4 | 2
6 | (United States) Z Garrison | 6 | 6

Quarterfinals
3 | (Czechoslovakia) H Suková | 3 | 1
6 | (United States) Z Garrison | 6 | 6

=== Bottom half ===
==== Section 3 ====
First round
Q | (New Zealand) J Richardson | 4 | 6 | 6
(Czechoslovakia) R Maršíková | 6 | 3 | 0
(Hong Kong) P Hy | 6 | 3 | 6
(United States) A Moulton | 3 | 6 | 1
(United States) A Smith | 6 | 6
11 | (Canada) C Bassett | 4 | 4
(United Kingdom) A Hobbs | 7 | 6 | 6
(Canada) H Kelesi | 6 | 7 | 4
(Australia) A Minter | 7 | 4 | 7
(United States) C MacGregor | 6 | 6 | 5
Q | (Belgium) A Devries | 6 | 6 | 5
(Japan) E Inoue | 7 | 4 | 7

Second round
5 | (Bulgaria) Man Maleeva | 6 | 6
Q | (New Zealand) J Richardson | 1 | 3
(Hong Kong) P Hy | 1 | 1
(United States) A Smith | 6 | 6
(United Kingdom) A Hobbs | 6 | 3 | 3
(Australia) A Minter | 2 | 6 | 6
(Japan) E Inoue | 6 | 6
4 | (West Germany) C Kohde-Kilsch | 4 | 2

Third round
5 | (Bulgaria) Man Maleeva | 7 | 6
(United States) A Smith | 5 | 1
(Australia) A Minter | 4 | 6 | 4
(Japan) E Inoue | 6 | 2 | 6

Quarterfinals
5 | (Bulgaria) Man Maleeva | 4 | 6 | 6
(Japan) E Inoue | 6 | 2 | 2

==== Section 4 ====
First round
(South Africa) D Van Rensburg | 7 | 6
(United States) B Nagelsen | 6 | 2
(Australia) J Tremelling | 6 | 7
Q | (United States) S Walsh-Pete | 4 | 5
Q | (Switzerland) E Krapl | 1 | 6
9 | (Sweden) C Lindqvist | 6 | 7
14 | (United States) M Werdel | 0 | 4
(United States) G Magers | 6 | 6
(United States) T Mochizuki | 6 | 6
(France) MC Calleja | 2 | 4
Q | (Australia) A Tobin-Dingwall | 4 | 6 | 5
(United Kingdom) S Gomer | 6 | 3 | 7

Second round
8 | (United States) R White | 3 | 6 | 1
(South Africa) D Van Rensburg | 6 | 2 | 6
(Australia) J Tremelling | 1 | 2
9 | (Sweden) C Lindqvist | 6 | 6
(United States) G Magers | 6 | 6
(United States) T Mochizuki | 4 | 3
(United Kingdom) S Gomer | 1 | 2
2 | (United States) P Shriver | 6 | 6

Third round
(South Africa) D Van Rensburg | 5 | 5
9 | (Sweden) C Lindqvist | 7 | 7
(United States) G Magers | 3 | 0
2 | (United States) P Shriver | 6 | 6

Quarterfinals
9 | (Sweden) C Lindqvist | 4 | 2
2 | (United States) P Shriver | 6 | 6
