= 1990 Holden NSW Open – Men's doubles =

Men's doubles
- 1990 Holden NSW Open

Final
- Champions: (Australia) Pat Cash (Australia) Mark Kratzmann
- Runners-up: (South Africa) Pieter Aldrich (South Africa) Danie Visser
- Score: 6–4, 7–5

Details
- Draw: 16
- Seeds: 4

Events
Singles	men	women
Doubles	men	women
← 1989 ·	Sydney International	· 1991 →

Darren Cahill and Wally Masur were the defending champions. Cahill did not compete that year, while Masur partnered Brad Drewett, but lost in the first round.
Pat Cash and Mark Kratzmann won the title, defeating Pieter Aldrich and Danie Visser 6–4, 7–5, in the final.

== Seeds ==
1. (South Africa) Pieter Aldrich / (South Africa) Danie Visser (final)
2. (United States) Paul Annacone / (South Africa) Christo van Rensburg (first round)
3. (Socialist Federal Republic of Yugoslavia) Goran Ivanišević / (Czechoslovakia) Petr Korda (semifinals)
4. (Spain) Tomás Carbonell / (Mexico) Leonardo Lavalle (first round)

== Draw ==
=== Key ===
- Q = Qualifier
- WC = Wild card
- LL = Lucky loser
- Alt = Alternate
- ITF = ITF entry
- PR = Protected ranking
- SR = Special ranking
- SE = Special exempt
- JE = Junior exempt
- JR = Junior Accelerator Programme entrant
- CO = College Accelerator Programme entrant
- NG = Next Gen Accelerator Program entrant
- w/o = Walkover
- r = Retired
- d = Defaulted

=== Draw ===
First round
1	(South Africa) P Aldrich (South Africa) D Visser	6	7	6
(Australia) P Doohan (Australia) S Youl	7	5	4
(Austria) A Antonitsch (Hungary) B Taróczy	7	6
(United States) S Cannon (United States) B Page	6	4
4	(Spain) T Carbonell (Mexico) L Lavalle	4	3
(United States) P Sampras (United States) D Wheaton	6	6
(Italy) O Camporese (Italy) D Nargiso	5	7	6
(France) J-P Fleurian (France) É Winogradsky	7	6	1
(Ecuador) A Gómez (Venezuela) N Pereira	4	6	6
Q	(Argentina) H de la Peña (Spain) F Roig	6	2	2
(South Africa) N Broad (South Africa) G Muller	3	4
3	(Socialist Federal Republic of Yugoslavia) G Ivanišević (Czechoslovakia) P Korda	6	6
(Australia) B Dyke (Netherlands) T Nijssen	6	6
(Australia) B Drewett (Australia) W Masur	4	4
(Australia) P Cash (Australia) M Kratzmann	6	6	6
2	(United States) P Annacone (South Africa) C van Rensburg	4	7	3

Quarterfinals
1	(South Africa) P Aldrich (South Africa) D Visser	6	6
(Austria) A Antonitsch (Hungary) B Taróczy	3	4
(United States) P Sampras (United States) D Wheaton	6	6	6
(Italy) O Camporese (Italy) D Nargiso	7	4	2
(Ecuador) A Gómez (Venezuela) N Pereira	3	4
3	(Socialist Federal Republic of Yugoslavia) G Ivanišević (Czechoslovakia) P Korda	6	6
(Australia) B Dyke (Netherlands) T Nijssen	1	2
(Australia) P Cash (Australia) M Kratzmann	6	6

Semifinals
1	(South Africa) P Aldrich (South Africa) D Visser	6	7
(United States) P Sampras (United States) D Wheaton	4	6
3	(Socialist Federal Republic of Yugoslavia) G Ivanišević (Czechoslovakia) P Korda	4	6	6
(Australia) P Cash (Australia) M Kratzmann	6	3	7

Final
1	(South Africa) P Aldrich (South Africa) D Visser	4	5
(Australia) P Cash (Australia) M Kratzmann	6	7
