= 1990 Holden NSW Open – Women's doubles =

Women's doubles
- 1990 Holden NSW Open

Final
- Champions: (Czechoslovakia) Jana Novotná (Czechoslovakia) Helena Suková
- Runners-up: (Soviet Union) Larisa Savchenko (Soviet Union) Natasha Zvereva
- Score: 6–3, 7–5

Details
- Draw: 28 (2WC/1Q)
- Seeds: 8

Events
Singles	men	women
Doubles	men	women
← 1989 ·	Sydney International	· 1991 →

Martina Navratilova and Pam Shriver were the defending champions, but Navratilova did not compete this year. Shriver teamed up with Hana Mandlíková and lost in the second round to Maria Lindström and Heather Ludloff.

Jana Novotná and Helena Suková won the title by defeating Larisa Savchenko and Natasha Zvereva 6–3, 7–5 in the final.

== Seeds ==
The top four seeds received a bye to the second round.

1. (Czechoslovakia) Jana Novotná / (Czechoslovakia) Helena Suková (champions)
2. (Soviet Union) Larisa Savchenko / (Soviet Union) Natasha Zvereva (final)
3. (Australia) Hana Mandlíková / (United States) Pam Shriver (second round)
4. (United States) Gigi Fernández / (United States) Robin White (second round, withdrew)
5. (United States) Patty Fendick / (United States) Mary Joe Fernández (quarterfinals)
6. (United States) Katrina Adams / (United States) Lori McNeil (first round)
7. (Australia) Janine Thompson / (Australia) Wendy Turnbull (quarterfinals)
8. (Canada) Jill Hetherington / (Australia) Nicole Provis (second round)

== Draw ==
=== Key ===
- Q = Qualifier
- WC = Wild card
- LL = Lucky loser
- Alt = Alternate
- SE = Special exempt
- PR = Protected ranking
- ITF = ITF entry
- JE = Junior exempt
- w/o = Walkover
- r = Retired
- d = Defaulted
- SR = Special ranking

=== Finals ===
Semifinals
1	(Czechoslovakia) Jana Novotná (Czechoslovakia) Helena Suková	4	6	6
(Sweden) Maria Lindström (United States) Heather Ludloff	6	4	3
(United States) Kathy Jordan (Australia) Elizabeth Smylie	5	3
2	(Soviet Union) Larisa Savchenko (Soviet Union) Natasha Zvereva	7	6

Final
1	(Czechoslovakia) Jana Novotná (Czechoslovakia) Helena Suková	6	7
2	(Soviet Union) Larisa Savchenko (Soviet Union) Natasha Zvereva	3	5

=== Top half ===
First round
(United States) R Reis (United States) S Stafford	5	3
(Australia) JA Faull (Australia) R McQuillan	7	6
(West Germany) C Porwik (Italy) R Reggi	3	7^{7}	3
(United States) Ca MacGregor (United States) Cy MacGregor	6	6^{5}	6
(France) N Herreman (France) C Suire	4	2
8	(Canada) J Hetherington (Australia) N Provis	6	6
(Sweden) M Lindström (United States) H Ludloff	6	2	6
(Netherlands) M Bollegraf (United Kingdom) J Durie	2	6	3
(Netherlands) B Schultz (Hungary) A Temesvári	6	6
(France) I Demongeot (France) C Tanvier	3	4
(Australia) L Field (South Africa) L Gregory	3	7	6
6	(United States) K Adams (United States) L McNeil	6	5	4

Second round
1	(Czechoslovakia) J Novotná (Czechoslovakia) H Suková	6	6
(Australia) JA Faull (Australia) R McQuillan	3	1
(United States) Ca MacGregor (United States) Cy MacGregor	3	6	6
8	(Canada) J Hetherington (Australia) N Provis	6	4	4
3	(Australia) H Mandlíková (United States) P Shriver	6^{5}	4
(Sweden) M Lindström (United States) H Ludloff	7^{7}	6
(Netherlands) B Schultz (Hungary) A Temesvári	6	6
(Australia) L Field (South Africa) L Gregory	3	4

Quarterfinals
1	(Czechoslovakia) J Novotná (Czechoslovakia) H Suková	7	6
(United States) Ca MacGregor (United States) Cy MacGregor	5	4
(Sweden) M Lindström (United States) H Ludloff	6	6
(Netherlands) B Schultz (Hungary) A Temesvári	3	4

Semifinals
1	(Czechoslovakia) J Novotná (Czechoslovakia) H Suková	4	6	6
(Sweden) M Lindström (United States) H Ludloff	6	4	3

=== Bottom half ===
First round
7	(Australia) J Thompson (Australia) W Turnbull	6	1	6
WC	(Australia) L O'Neill (Netherlands) S Schilder	4	6	1
(United States) E Burgin (South Africa) R Fairbank	6	7^{7}
Q	(United States) H Cioffi (United States) A Frazier	4	6^{5}
(United States) K Jordan (Australia) E Smylie	7^{7}	6
(United States) A Henricksson (Denmark) T Scheuer-Larsen	6^{2}	1
5	(United States) P Fendick (United States) MJ Fernández	7^{7}	5	6
(Netherlands) C Bakkum (South Africa) D Van Rensburg	6^{2}	7	4
(United States) S Collins (United States) J Smoller	6	6
(Canada) H Kelesi (United States) T Phelps	3	4
WC	(Australia) K McDonald (Australia) K Radford	3	5
(Italy) L Golarsa (Austria) J Wiesner	6	7

Second round
7	(Australia) J Thompson (Australia) W Turnbull	6	3	7^{7}
(United States) E Burgin (South Africa) R Fairbank	2	6	6^{3}
(United States) K Jordan (Australia) E Smylie	w/o
4	(United States) G Fernández (United States) R White
5	(United States) P Fendick (United States) MJ Fernández	6	6
(United States) S Collins (United States) J Smoller	3	1
(Italy) L Golarsa (Austria) J Wiesner	4	2
2	(Soviet Union) L Savchenko (Soviet Union) N Zvereva	6	6

Quarterfinals
7	(Australia) J Thompson (Australia) W Turnbull	3	4
(United States) K Jordan (Australia) E Smylie	6	6
5	(United States) P Fendick (United States) MJ Fernández	4	2
2	(Soviet Union) L Savchenko (Soviet Union) N Zvereva	6	6

Semifinals
(United States) K Jordan (Australia) E Smylie	5	3
2	(Soviet Union) L Savchenko (Soviet Union) N Zvereva	7	6
