= 1989 New South Wales Open – Women's singles =

Women's singles
- 1989 New South Wales Open
- 1988 Champion: (United States) Pam Shriver

Final
- Champion: (United States) Martina Navratilova
- Runner-up: (Sweden) Catarina Lindqvist
- Score: 6–2, 6–4

Details
- Draw: 56
- Seeds: 16

Events
Singles	men	women
Doubles	men	women
← 1988 ·	New South Wales Open	· 1990 →

Pam Shriver was the defending champion and lost in the quarter-finals to Terry Phelps.

Martina Navratilova won in the final 6–2, 6–4 against Catarina Lindqvist.

== Seeds ==
A champion seed is indicated in bold text while text in italics indicates the round in which that seed was eliminated. The top eight seeds received a bye to the second round.

1. (United States) **Martina Navratilova (champion)**
2. (United States) Pam Shriver (quarterfinals)
3. (Czechoslovakia) Helena Suková (third round)
4. (United States) Mary Joe Fernández (quarterfinals)
5. (United States) Patty Fendick (quarterfinals)
6. (Italy) Raffaella Reggi (third round)
7. (Australia) Anne Minter (third round)
8. (France) Pascale Paradis (second round)
9. (Australia) Hana Mandlíková (semifinals)
10. (Australia) Nicole Provis (second round)
11. (Austria) Judith Wiesner (quarterfinals)
12. (Netherlands) Brenda Schultz (first round)
13. (Sweden) Catarina Lindqvist (final)
14. (United States) Gretchen Magers (third round)
15. (United States) Ann Grossman (third round)
16. (United States) Terry Phelps (semifinals)

== Draw ==
=== Key ===
- Q = Qualifier
- WC = Wild card
- LL = Lucky loser
- Alt = Alternate
- ITF = ITF entry
- PR = Protected ranking
- SR = Special ranking
- SE = Special exempt
- JE = Junior exempt
- JR = Junior Accelerator Programme entrant
- CO = College Accelerator Programme entrant
- NG = Next Gen Accelerator Program entrant
- w/o = Walkover
- r = Retired
- d = Defaulted

=== Finals ===
Semi-finals
1	(United States) **Martina Navratilova**	**6**	**6**
9	(Australia) Hana Mandlíková	3	2
13	(Sweden) **Catarina Lindqvist**	5	**6**	**7**
16	(United States) Terry Phelps	**7**	3	6

Final
1	(United States) **Martina Navratilova**	**6**	**6**
13	(Sweden) Catarina Lindqvist	2	4

=== Top half ===
==== Section 1 ====
First round
(United Kingdom) M Javer	6	6
(Hungary) **A Temesvári**	**7**	**7**
Q	(United States) L Antonoplis	1	4
(United States) **A Henricksson**	**6**	**6**
(South Africa) **D Van Rensburg**	**6**	**7**
12	(Netherlands) B Schultz	2	5
15	(United States) **A Grossman**	**7**	**6**
(Canada) J Hetherington	5	2
(United States) A Smith	3	3
(Australia) **D Balestrat**	**6**	**6**
(Czechoslovakia) **P Langrová**	4	**7**	**6**
(West Germany) W Probst	**6**	5	1

Second round
1	(United States) **M Navratilova**	**6**	**6**
(Hungary) A Temesvári	2	4
(United States) A Henricksson	5	3
(South Africa) **D Van Rensburg**	**7**	**6**
15	(United States) **A Grossman**	4	**6**	**6**
(Australia) D Balestrat	**6**	3	4
(Czechoslovakia) P Langrová	2	3
5	(United States) **P Fendick**	**6**	**6**

Third round
1	(United States) **M Navratilova**	**6**	**6**
(South Africa) D Van Rensburg	0	3
15	(United States) A Grossman	4	2
5	(United States) **P Fendick**	**6**	**6**

Quarter-finals
1	(United States) **M Navratilova**	**6**	**6**
5	(United States) P Fendick	1	1

==== Section 2 ====
First round
(New Zealand) **B Cordwell**	**7**	**6**
(Poland) I Kuczyńska	6	2
(United States) K Adams	6	4
Q	(Australia) **E Minter**	**7**	**6**
Q	(Canada) R Simpson	2	0
14	(United States) **G Magers**	**6**	**6**
9	(Australia) **H Mandlíková**	3	**7**	**7**
(United Kingdom) J Durie	**6**	5	6
(France) **N Herreman**	**7**	4	**6**
(West Germany) S Meier	5	**6**	1
(United States) **A Frazier**	**7**	**6**
(France) J Halard	6	4

Second round
4	(United States) **M J Fernández**	**6**	**6**
(New Zealand) B Cordwell	3	0
Q	(Australia) E Minter	3	2
14	(United States) **G Magers**	**6**	**6**
9	(Australia) **H Mandlíková**	**6**	**6**
(France) N Herreman	3	3
(United States) **A Frazier**	**6**	3	**6**
8	(France) P Paradis	3	**6**	2

Third round
4	(United States) **M J Fernández**	6	**6**	**6**
14	(United States) G Magers	**7**	2	1
9	(Australia) **H Mandlíková**	**6**	**7**
(United States) A Frazier	3	5

Quarter-finals
4	(United States) M J Fernández	**6**	6	3
9	(Australia) **H Mandlíková**	2	**7**	**6**

=== Bottom half ===
==== Section 3 ====
First round
Q	(United States) E Burgin	1	4
(Italy) **L Golarsa**	**6**	**6**
(Netherlands) N Jagerman	3	**6**	4
(United States) **C Benjamin**	**6**	4	**6**
(Australia) R McQuillan	**6**	6	6
11	(Austria) **J Wiesner**	4	**7**	**7**
15	(Sweden) **C Lindqvist**	**6**	**6**
(France) C Tanvier	4	1
Q	(Australia) **L Field**	**7**	**6**
(West Germany) E Pfaff	6	2
(Australia) **E Smylie**	3	**6**	**6**
Q	(France) A Dechaume	**6**	1	2

Second round
7	(Australia) **A Minter**	**6**	3	**6**
(Italy) L Golarsa	2	**6**	3
(United States) C Benjamin	5	2
11	(Austria) **J Wiesner**	**7**	**6**
13	(Sweden) **C Lindqvist**	**6**	**7**
Q	(Australia) L Field	3	6
(Australia) E Smylie	1	3
3	(Czechoslovakia) **H Suková**	**6**	**6**

Third round
7	(Australia) A Minter	5	3
11	(Austria) **J Wiesner**	**7**	**6**
13	(Sweden) **C Lindqvist**	**6**	**6**
3	(Czechoslovakia) H Suková	3	0

Quarter-finals
11	(Austria) J Wiesner	**7**	6	3
13	(Sweden) **C Lindqvist**	5	**7**	**6**

==== Section 4 ====
First round
(United States) K Horvath	2	**6**	1
Q	(United States) **R Reis**	**6**	3	**6**
(United States) **B Herr**	4	**6**	**7**
(West Germany) C Porwik	**6**	4	6
(Belgium) A Devries	3	4
16	(United States) **T Phelps**	**6**	**6**
10	(Australia) **N Provis**	**6**	**7**
(Netherlands) H Witvoet	3	6
(Japan) **E Inoue**	**6**	**6**
Q	(Italy) F Bonsignori	4	3
(Australia) **J-A Faull**	3	**6**	**6**
(United States) B Bowes	**6**	1	1

Second round
6	(Italy) **R Reggi**	**6**	**6**
Q	(United States) R Reis	4	2
(United States) B Herr	2	**6**	4
16	(United States) **T Phelps**	**6**	4	**6**
10	(Australia) N Provis	4	4
(Japan) **E Inoue**	**6**	**6**
(Australia) J-A Faull	1	4
2	(United States) **P Shriver**	**6**	**6**

Third round
6	(Italy) R Reggi	3	5
16	(United States) **T Phelps**	**6**	**7**
(Japan) E Inoue	2	3
2	(United States) **P Shriver**	**6**	**6**

Quarter-finals
16	(United States) **T Phelps**	**6**	**6**
2	(United States) P Shriver	3	3
