= 1990 Holden NSW Open – Men's singles =

Men's singles
- 1990 Holden NSW Open
- 1989 Champion: (United States) Aaron Krickstein

Final
- Champion: (France) Yannick Noah
- Runner-up: (West Germany) Carl-Uwe Steeb
- Score: 5–7, 6–3, 6–4

Details
- Draw: 32
- Seeds: 8

Events
Singles	men	women
Doubles	men	women
← 1989 ·	Sydney International	· 1991 →

Yannick Noah defeated Carl-Uwe Steeb 5–7, 6–3, 6–4, to win the men's singles tennis title at the 1990 New South Wales Open.

Aaron Krickstein was the defending champion, but lost in the semifinals to Noah.

== Seeds ==
1. (Czechoslovakia) Ivan Lendl (quarterfinals)
2. (West Germany) Boris Becker (quarterfinals)
3. (United States) Aaron Krickstein (semifinals)
4. (United States) Tim Mayotte (first round)
5. (Sweden) Mats Wilander (semifinals)
6. (Ecuador) Andrés Gómez (first round)
7. (West Germany) Carl-Uwe Steeb (final)
8. (France) Yannick Noah (champion)

== Draw ==
=== Key ===
- Q = Qualifier
- WC = Wild card
- LL = Lucky loser
- Alt = Alternate
- SE = Special exempt
- PR = Protected ranking
- ITF = ITF entry
- JE = Junior exempt
- w/o = Walkover
- r = Retired
- d = Defaulted
- SR = Special ranking

=== Finals ===
Semifinals
8	(France) Yannick Noah	6	7
3	(United States) Aaron Krickstein	4	5
5	(Sweden) Mats Wilander	3	2
7	(West Germany) Carl-Uwe Steeb	6	6

Final
8	(France) Yannick Noah	5	6	6
7	(West Germany) Carl-Uwe Steeb	7	3	4

=== Top half ===
First round
1	(Czechoslovakia) I Lendl	6	6
(Canada) A Sznajder	1	3
(Spain) S Bruguera	5	2
(Socialist Federal Republic of Yugoslavia) G Ivanišević	7	6
(Czechoslovakia) P Korda	1	6	2
Q	(Soviet Union) A Cherkasov	6	4	6
(Haiti) R Agénor	4	3
8	(France) Y Noah	6	6
3	(United States) A Krickstein	7^{8}	6
(Sweden) J Gunnarsson	6^{6}	2
(United States) P Annacone	6	6
WC	(Australia) M Kratzmann	1	4
(France) G Forget	7	6
(Netherlands) M Koevermans	5	3
Q	(United States) D Wheaton	7	6
6	(Ecuador) A Gómez	5	4

Second round
1	(Czechoslovakia) I Lendl	6	6
(Socialist Federal Republic of Yugoslavia) G Ivanišević	4	2
Q	(Soviet Union) A Cherkasov	1	4
8	(France) Y Noah	6	6
3	(United States) A Krickstein	6	7^{7}
(United States) P Annacone	3	6^{2}
(France) G Forget	6^{0}	1
Q	(United States) D Wheaton	7^{7}	6

Quarterfinals
1	(Czechoslovakia) I Lendl	1	4
8	(France) Y Noah	6	6
3	(United States) A Krickstein	6	7^{7}
Q	(United States) D Wheaton	1	6^{3}

Semifinals
8	(France) Y Noah	6	7
3	(United States) A Krickstein	4	5

=== Bottom half ===
First round
5	(Sweden) M Wilander	6	6
(Switzerland) M Rosset	4	2
(South Africa) C van Rensburg	6^{4}	2
(Sweden) N Kroon	7^{7}	6
(Italy) O Camporese	4	6	6
(Spain) J Arrese	6	4	4
Q	(United States) P Sampras	7^{8}	6
4	(United States) T Mayotte	6^{6}	2
7	(West Germany) C-U Steeb	6	6
Q	(Mexico) L Lavalle	1	4
(Socialist Federal Republic of Yugoslavia) G Prpić	2	2
SE	(France) J-P Fleurian	6	6
WC	(Australia) W Masur	2	6	7^{7}
(Spain) J Sánchez	6	2	6^{1}
(Soviet Union) A Volkov	3	2
2/WC	(West Germany) B Becker	6	6

Second round
5	(Sweden) M Wilander	6	6
(Sweden) N Kroon	1	2
(Italy) O Camporese	6^{5}	5
Q	(United States) P Sampras	7^{7}	7
7	(West Germany) C-U Steeb	6	4	6
SE	(France) J-P Fleurian	4	6	2
WC	(Australia) W Masur	3	3
2/WC	(West Germany) B Becker	6	6

Quarterfinals
5	(Sweden) M Wilander	6^{4}	7	6
Q	(United States) P Sampras	7^{7}	5	0
7	(West Germany) C-U Steeb	7^{7}	6
2/WC	(West Germany) B Becker	6^{3}	3

Semifinals
5	(Sweden) M Wilander	3	2
7	(West Germany) C-U Steeb	6	6
