= Libor Němeček =

Czech tennis player (born 1968)

- Country (sports): Czechoslovakia; Czech Republic
- Residence: Hungen, Germany
- Born: 26 October 1968 (age 57) Tanvald, Czechoslovakia
- Height: 1.68 m (5 ft 6 in)
- Turned pro: 1988
- Plays: Right-handed
- Prize money: $180,351

Singles
- Career record: 11–20
- Career titles: 0
- Highest ranking: No. 164 (25 May 1992)

Grand Slam singles results
- Australian Open: 1R (1990)

Doubles
- Career record: 0–1
- Career titles: 0
- Highest ranking: No. 585 (20 Jun 1994)

Libor Němeček (born 26 October 1968) is a Czech former professional tennis player.

== Career ==
Němeček had some success as a junior in his native country. He won the Czechoslovak Under-14s Championship and was later the doubles winner with Cyril Suk at the Under-18s Championships.

In 1989 New South Wales Open, Němeček was a quarter-finalist, securing wins over Jan Gunnarsson and then world number 51 Magnus Gustafsson. He also reached the round of 16 in Kitzbuhel that year.

The Czechoslovak was runner-up at the U.S. Pro Tennis Championships in 1990, but the event was no longer part of the ATP Tour. After making it through qualifying, Nemecek lost in the opening round of the 1990 Australian Open to Canadian Andrew Sznajder, in four sets.

He made two further quarter-finals in his career, at Wellington in 1991 and Bordeaux in 1993.

Němeček is currently working as a tennis coach in Prague.

== Challenger titles ==
=== Singles: (1) ===
No.	Year	Tournament	Surface	Opponent	Score
1.	1991	São Paulo, Brazil	Hard	(Haiti) Bertrand Madsen	5–7, 6–4, 6–3
