= 1991 Holden NSW Open – Men's doubles =

Men's doubles
- 1991 Holden NSW Open

Final
- Champions: (United States) Scott Davis (United States) David Pate
- Runners-up: (Australia) Darren Cahill (Australia) Mark Kratzmann
- Score: 3–6, 6–3, 6–2

Details
- Draw: 16 (1WC/1Q)
- Seeds: 4

Events
Singles	men	women
Doubles	men	women
- Sydney International

Pat Cash and Mark Kratzmann were the defending champions, but Cash did not compete this year.

Kratzmann teamed up with Darren Cahill and lost in the final to Scott Davis and David Pate. The score was 3–6, 6–3, 6–2.

== Seeds ==
1. (United States) Scott Davis / (United States) David Pate (champions)
2. (Australia) Darren Cahill / (Australia) Mark Kratzmann (final)
3. (United States) Patrick Galbraith / (United States) Todd Witsken (semifinals)
4. (United Kingdom) Jeremy Bates / (South Africa) Gary Muller (first round)

== Draw ==
Key

- Q = Qualifier
- WC = Wild card
- LL = Lucky loser
- Alt = Alternate
- ITF = ITF entry
- PR = Protected ranking
- SR = Special ranking
- SE = Special exempt
- JE = Junior exempt
- JR = Junior Accelerator Programme entrant
- CO = College Accelerator Programme entrant
- NG = Next Gen Accelerator Program entrant
- w/o = Walkover
- r = Retired
- d = Defaulted

=== Draw ===
First round
1	(United States) S Davis (United States) D Pate	6	6
(Nigeria) N Odizor (The Bahamas) R Smith	3	4
(South Africa) S Kruger (South Africa) C van Rensburg	6	6
Q	(Argentina) J Frana (Argentina) C Miniussi	4	3
3	(United States) P Galbraith (United States) T Witsken	7	2	6
(United States) P McEnroe (United States) D Wheaton	6	6	2
(United States) S DeVries (Australia) D Macpherson	4	6
(Czechoslovakia) P Korda (Czechoslovakia) C Suk	6	7
(Australia) T Woodbridge (Australia) M Woodforde	5	6	7
(Netherlands) P Haarhuis (Netherlands) M Koevermans	7	4	6
WC	(Australia) L Warder (Australia) S Youl	6	6
4	(United Kingdom) J Bates (South Africa) G Muller	2	4
(Australia) B Dyke (Sweden) P Lundgren	2	6
(Australia) W Masur (Australia) S Stoltenberg	6	7
(Spain) S Bruguera (Argentina) G Luza	6	2
2	(Australia) D Cahill (Australia) M Kratzmann	7	6

Quarterfinals
1	(United States) S Davis (United States) D Pate	7	7
(South Africa) S Kruger (South Africa) C van Rensburg	6	6
3	(United States) P Galbraith (United States) T Witsken	2	6	6
(Czechoslovakia) P Korda (Czechoslovakia) C Suk	6	2	3
(Australia) T Woodbridge (Australia) M Woodforde	4	6	6
WC	(Australia) L Warder (Australia) S Youl	6	1	3
(Australia) W Masur (Australia) S Stoltenberg	6	7	3
2	(Australia) D Cahill (Australia) M Kratzmann	7	6	6

Semifinals
1	(United States) S Davis (United States) D Pate	6	6
3	(United States) P Galbraith (United States) T Witsken	4	4
(Australia) T Woodbridge (Australia) M Woodforde	3	6	2
2	(Australia) D Cahill (Australia) M Kratzmann	6	2	6

Final
1	(United States) S Davis (United States) D Pate	3	6	6
2	(Australia) D Cahill (Australia) M Kratzmann	6	3	2
