= 1988 New South Wales Open – Women's doubles =

Women's doubles
- 1988 New South Wales Open
- 1987 Champions: (United States) Betsy Nagelsen (Australia) Elizabeth Smylie

Final
- Champions: (United States) Ann Henricksson (Switzerland) Christiane Jolissaint
- Runners-up: (West Germany) Claudia Kohde-Kilsch (Czechoslovakia) Helena Suková
- Score: 7–6, 4–6, 6–3

Events
| Singles | men | women |
| Doubles | men | women |
| ← 1987 · | New South Wales Open | · 1989 → |

Betsy Nagelsen and Elizabeth Smylie were the defending champions but they competed with different partners that year, Nagelsen with Lori McNeil and Smylie with Jana Novotná.

McNeil and Nagelsen lost in the quarter-finals to Catherine Suire and Catherine Tanvier.

Novotná and Smylie lost in the semi-finals to Claudia Kohde-Kilsch and Helena Suková.

Ann Henricksson and Christiane Jolissaint won in the final 7–6, 4–6, 6–3 against Kohde-Kilsch and Suková.

== Seeds ==
Champion seeds are indicated in bold text while text in italics indicates the round in which those seeds were eliminated. The top four seeded teams received byes into the second round.

1. (West Germany) Claudia Kohde-Kilsch / (Czechoslovakia) Helena Suková (final)
2. (United States) Lori McNeil / (United States) Betsy Nagelsen (quarterfinals)
3. (Czechoslovakia) Jana Novotná / (Australia) Elizabeth Smylie (semifinals)
4. (West Germany) Bettina Bunge / (West Germany) Eva Pfaff (second round)
5. (South Africa) Rosalyn Fairbank / (United States) Candy Reynolds (first round)
6. (Australia) Jenny Byrne / (Australia) Janine Tremelling (first round)
7. (France) Catherine Suire / (France) Catherine Tanvier (semifinals)
8. (United Kingdom) Jo Durie / (United States) Sharon Walsh-Pete (quarterfinals)

== Draw ==
=== Key ===
- Q = Qualifier
- WC = Wild card
- LL = Lucky loser
- Alt = Alternate
- SE = Special exempt
- PR = Protected ranking
- ITF = ITF entry
- JE = Junior exempt
- w/o = Walkover
- r = Retired
- d = Defaulted
- SR = Special ranking

=== Final ===
| Final |
| 1 | (West Germany) Claudia Kohde-Kilsch (Czechoslovakia) Helena Suková | 6 | **6** | 3 |
| | (United States) **Ann Henricksson** (Switzerland) **Christiane Jolissaint** | **7** | 4 | **6** |

=== Top half ===
First round
(Australia) J-A Faull (Australia) R McQuillan | 2 | 6
(United States) **L Antonoplis** (Australia) **A Minter** | **6** | **7**
(United States) A M Fernandez (Australia) L Field | 2 | 2
(United States) **C Benjamin** (Australia) **M Jaggard** | **6** | **6**
(New Zealand) B Cordwell (New Zealand) J Richardson | 3 | 5
8 | (United Kingdom) **J Durie** (United States) **S Walsh-Pete** | **6** | **7**
(United Kingdom) J Salmon (Japan) M Yanagi | **6** | 3 | 1
(United States) **D-A Hansel** (United States) **P Smith** | 3 | **6** | **6**
(Australia) A Scott (United States) W Wood | 4 | 4
(Netherlands) **C Bakkum** (Netherlands) **H Witvoet** | **6** | **6**
(United States) **H Ludloff** (Australia) **E Minter** | **6** | **7**
5 | (South Africa) R Fairbank (United States) C Reynolds | 3 | 6

Second round
1 | (West Germany) **C Kohde-Kilsch** (Czechoslovakia) **H Suková** | **7** | **6**
(United States) L Antonoplis (Australia) A Minter | 5 | 3
(United States) C Benjamin (Australia) M Jaggard | 6 | 0
8 | (United Kingdom) **J Durie** (United States) **S Walsh-Pete** | **7** | **6**
3 | (Czechoslovakia) **J Novotná** (Australia) **E Smylie** | **6** | **6**
(United States) D-A Hansel (United States) P Smith | 3 | 3
(Netherlands) **C Bakkum** (Netherlands) **H Witvoet** | **7** | **6**
(United States) H Ludloff (Australia) E Minter | 6 | 2

Quarter-finals
1 | (West Germany) **C Kohde-Kilsch** (Czechoslovakia) **H Suková** | **6** | **6**
8 | (United Kingdom) J Durie (United States) S Walsh-Pete | 2 | 2
3 | (Czechoslovakia) **J Novotná** (Australia) **E Smylie** | **6** | **6**
(Netherlands) C Bakkum (Netherlands) H Witvoet | 2 | 3

Semi-finals
1 | (West Germany) **C Kohde-Kilsch** (Czechoslovakia) **H Suková** | **6** | **7**
3 | (Czechoslovakia) J Novotná (Australia) E Smylie | 3 | 6

=== Bottom half ===
First round
6 | (Australia) J Byrne (Australia) J Tremelling | 4 | **6** | 3
(United States) **A Henricksson** (Switzerland) **C Jolissaint** | **6** | 3 | **6**
(Netherlands) **N Jagerman** (United States) **J Kaplan** | **6** | **7**
(Netherlands) M Bollegraf (United States) S Collins | 2 | 6
(Sweden) **C Lindqvist** (Sweden) **M Lindström** | **6** | **7**
(United States) Ca MacGregor (United States) Cy MacGregor | 4 | 5
7 | (France) **C Suire** (France) **C Tanvier** | **6** | **6**
(United States) K Steinmetz (United States) J Thomas | 3 | 0
(United States) **P Fendick** (Canada) **J Hetherington** | 4 | **6** | **7**
(Belgium) A Devries (Switzerland) E Krapl | **6** | 3 | 6
(France) **J Halard** (France) **P Paradis** | **6** | **6**
(Australia) B Potter (Australia) K Radford | 4 | 2

Second round
(United States) **A Henricksson** (Switzerland) **C Jolissaint** | **6** | **6**
(Netherlands) N Jagerman (United States) J Kaplan | 1 | 2
(Sweden) **C Lindqvist** (Sweden) **M Lindström** | **6** | **7**
4 | (West Germany) B Bunge (West Germany) E Pfaff | 3 | 6
7 | (France) **C Suire** (France) **C Tanvier** | **6** | 6 | **7**
(United States) P Fendick (Canada) J Hetherington | 1 | **7** | 6
(France) J Halard (France) P Paradis | 3 | 6
2 | (United States) **L McNeil** (United States) **B Nagelsen** | **6** | **7**

Quarter-finals
(United States) **A Henricksson** (Switzerland) **C Jolissaint** | **6** | **6**
(Sweden) C Lindqvist (Sweden) M Lindström | 2 | 2
7 | (France) **C Suire** (France) **C Tanvier** | **7** | 5 | **6**
2 | (United States) L McNeil (United States) B Nagelsen | 5 | **7** | 4

Semi-finals
(United States) **A Henricksson** (Switzerland) **C Jolissaint** | 4 | **6** | **7**
7 | (France) C Suire (France) C Tanvier | **6** | 4 | 6
