= 1989 New South Wales Open – Men's doubles =

Men's doubles
- 1989 New South Wales Open

Final
- Champions: (Australia) Darren Cahill (Australia) Wally Masur
- Runners-up: (South Africa) Pieter Aldrich (South Africa) Danie Visser
- Score: 6–4, 6–3

Details
- Draw: 16
- Seeds: 4

Events
Singles	men	women
Doubles	men	women
← 1988 ·	New South Wales Open	· 1990 →

Darren Cahill and Mark Kratzmann were the defending champions but only Cahill competed that year with Wally Masur.

Cahill and Masur won in the final 6–4, 6–3 against Pieter Aldrich and Danie Visser.

== Seeds ==
1. (South Africa) Pieter Aldrich / (South Africa) Danie Visser (final)
2. (Australia) Darren Cahill / (Australia) Wally Masur (champions)
3. (United States) Martin Davis / (Australia) Brad Drewett (first round)
4. (South Africa) Gary Muller / (South Africa) Christo van Rensburg (semifinals)

== Draw ==
=== Key ===
- Q = Qualifier
- WC = Wild card
- LL = Lucky loser
- Alt = Alternate
- SE = Special exempt
- PR = Protected ranking
- ITF = ITF entry
- JE = Junior exempt
- w/o = Walkover
- r = Retired
- d = Defaulted
- SR = Special ranking

First round
1	(South Africa) P Aldrich (South Africa) D Visser	6	6
(Austria) T Muster (Sweden) J Nyström	4	1
(United States) K Jones (United States) J Rive	6	6
(Czechoslovakia) M Mečíř (Czechoslovakia) C Suk	3	3
3	(United States) M Davis (Australia) B Drewett	5	2
(United Kingdom) J Bates (Sweden) P Lundgren	7	6
(Australia) J Stoltenberg (Australia) T Woodbridge	6	3	3
(Mexico) L Lavalle (West Germany) C Saceanu	0	6	6
(Australia) J Anderson (Australia) R Fromberg	4	5
(West Germany) T Meinecke (Sweden) J Svensson	6	7
(West Germany) P Kühnen (West Germany) C-U Steeb	1	2
4	(South Africa) G Muller (South Africa) C van Rensburg	6	6
(Australia) P Doohan (Australia) L Warder	5	7	4
(United Kingdom) N Broad (United States) G Layendecker	7	6	6
(Italy) D Nargiso (United States) L Shiras	3	4
2	(Australia) D Cahill (Australia) W Masur	6	6

Quarterfinals
1	(South Africa) P Aldrich (South Africa) D Visser	6	6
(United States) K Jones (United States) J Rive	2	2
(United Kingdom) J Bates (Sweden) P Lundgren	1	6	3
(Mexico) L Lavalle (West Germany) C Saceanu	6	4	6
(West Germany) T Meinecke (Sweden) J Svensson	4	7	6
4	(South Africa) G Muller (South Africa) C van Rensburg	6	5	7
(United Kingdom) N Broad (United States) G Layendecker	2	6	3
2	(Australia) D Cahill (Australia) W Masur	6	3	6

Semifinals
1	(South Africa) P Aldrich (South Africa) D Visser	6	2	6
(Mexico) L Lavalle (West Germany) C Saceanu	1	6	4
4	(South Africa) G Muller (South Africa) C van Rensburg	7	4	6
2	(Australia) D Cahill (Australia) W Masur	6	6	7

Final
1	(South Africa) P Aldrich (South Africa) D Visser	4	3
2	(Australia) D Cahill (Australia) W Masur	6	6
