= 1991 Holden NSW Open – Men's singles =

Men's singles
- 1991 Holden NSW Open

Final
- Champion: (France) Guy Forget
- Runner-up: (Germany) Michael Stich
- Score: 6–3, 6–4

Details
- Draw: 32 (3WC/4Q)
- Seeds: 8

Events
Singles	men	women
Doubles	men	women
- Sydney International

Yannick Noah was the defending champion, but did not compete this year.

Guy Forget won the title by defeating Michael Stich 6–3, 6–4 in the final.

== Seeds ==
1. (Czechoslovakia) Ivan Lendl (first round, retired)
2. (Sweden) Jonas Svensson (first round)
3. (France) Guy Forget (champion)
4. (Switzerland) Jakob Hlasek (second round)
5. (United States) Jay Berger (first round)
6. (United States) Aaron Krickstein (second round)
7. (Russia) Andrei Cherkasov (second round)
8. (Switzerland) Marc Rosset (first round)

== Draw ==
Key

- Q = Qualifier
- WC = Wild card
- LL = Lucky loser
- Alt = Alternate
- ITF = ITF entry
- PR = Protected ranking
- SR = Special ranking
- SE = Special exempt
- JE = Junior exempt
- JR = Junior Accelerator Programme entrant
- CO = College Accelerator Programme entrant
- NG = Next Gen Accelerator Program entrant
- w/o = Walkover
- r = Retired
- d = Defaulted

=== Finals ===
Semifinals
(United States) Derrick Rostagno	0	2
3	(France) Guy Forget	6	6
(Germany) Michael Stich	7^{8}	6
(Sweden) Magnus Gustafsson	6^{6}	4

Final
3	(France) Guy Forget	6	6
(Germany) Michael Stich	3	4

=== Top half ===
First round
1	(Czechoslovakia) I Lendl	6	6^{5}	r
WC	(Australia) W Masur	2	7^{7}
(United States) D Rostagno	6	6
(Austria) H Skoff	2	2
(Argentina) M Jaite	6	6
Q	(France) G Raoux	4	4
(United States) D Wheaton	2	0
7	(Russia) A Cherkasov	6	6
3	(France) G Forget	6	6
(United States) S Davis	3	3
(Australia) T Woodbridge	6	7
(Sweden) M Larsson	2	5
Q	(France) F Santoro	7	6
(Germany) CU Steeb	5	2
WC	(Australia) J Stoltenberg	7^{7}	1	1
6	(United States) A Krickstein	6^{5}	6	6

Second round
WC	(Australia) W Masur	4	6^{4}
(United States) D Rostagno	6	7^{7}
(Argentina) M Jaite	6	6
7	(Russia) A Cherkasov	4	1
3	(France) G Forget	6	6
(Australia) T Woodbridge	1	0
Q	(France) F Santoro	7	1	6
6	(United States) A Krickstein	5	6	3

Quarterfinals
(United States) D Rostagno	6	6
(Argentina) M Jaite	1	3
3	(France) G Forget	6	6
Q	(France) F Santoro	1	2

Semifinals
(United States) D Rostagno	0	2
3	(France) G Forget	6	6

=== Bottom half ===
First round
5	(United States) J Berger	3	4
Q	(Australia) J Anderson	6	6
(United States) J Arias	5	6	6
(Czechoslovakia) P Korda	7	2	2
(Germany) M Stich	6	6
(Soviet Union) A Volkov	4	3
(Sweden) N Kulti	6^{5}	2
4	(Switzerland) J Hlasek	7^{7}	6
8	(Switzerland) M Rosset	3	2
Q	(Netherlands) R Krajicek	6	6
WC	(Australia) D Cahill	6	1	6
(Spain) S Bruguera	4	6	4
(Netherlands) M Koevermans	3	6	1
(Israel) A Mansdorf	6	3	6
(Sweden) M Gustafsson	3	6	6
2	(Sweden) J Svensson	6	4	4

Second round
Q	(Australia) J Anderson	6	6
(United States) J Arias	4	3
(Germany) M Stich	3	7^{7}	6
4	(Switzerland) J Hlasek	6	6^{4}	4
Q	(Netherlands) R Krajicek	4	4
WC	(Australia) D Cahill	6	6
(Israel) A Mansdorf	6^{1}	3
(Sweden) M Gustafsson	7^{7}	6

Quarterfinals
Q	(Australia) J Anderson	3	0
(Germany) M Stich	6	6
WC	(Australia) D Cahill	5	4
(Sweden) M Gustafsson	7	6

Semifinals
(Germany) M Stich	7^{8}	6
(Sweden) M Gustafsson	6^{6}	4
