= 1989 New South Wales Open – Women's doubles =

Women's doubles
- 1989 New South Wales Open
- 1988 Champions: (United States) Ann Henricksson; (Switzerland) Christiane Jolissaint

Final
- Champions: (United States) Martina Navratilova; (United States) Pam Shriver
- Runners-up: (Australia) Elizabeth Smylie; (Australia) Wendy Turnbull
- Score: 6–3, 6–3

Details
- Draw: 28
- Seeds: 8

Events
Singles	men	women
Doubles	men	women
← 1988 ·	New South Wales Open	· 1990 →

Ann Henricksson and Christiane Jolissaint were the defending champions but only Henricksson competed that year with Gretchen Magers.

Henricksson and Magers lost in the semi-finals to Elizabeth Smylie and Wendy Turnbull.

Martina Navratilova and Pam Shriver won in the final 6–3, 6–3 against Smylie and Turnbull.

== Seeds ==
Champion seeds are indicated in bold text while text in italics indicates the round in which those seeds were eliminated. The top four seeded teams received byes into the second round.

1. (United States) **Martina Navratilova** / (United States) **Pam Shriver (champions)**
2. (Czechoslovakia) Jana Novotná / (Czechoslovakia) Helena Suková (quarterfinals)
3. n/a
4. (United States) Patty Fendick / (Canada) Jill Hetherington (quarterfinals)
5. (United States) Katrina Adams / (West Germany) Eva Pfaff (second round)
6. (Australia) Elizabeth Smylie / (Australia) Wendy Turnbull (final)
7. (Australia) Jenny Byrne / (Australia) Janine Tremelling (quarterfinals)
8. (United States) Terry Phelps / (Italy) Raffaella Reggi (quarterfinals)

== Draw ==
=== Key ===
- Q = Qualifier
- WC = Wild card
- LL = Lucky loser
- Alt = Alternate
- ITF = ITF entry
- PR = Protected ranking
- SR = Special ranking
- SE = Special exempt
- JE = Junior exempt
- JR = Junior Accelerator Programme entrant
- CO = College Accelerator Programme entrant
- NG = Next Gen Accelerator Program entrant
- w/o = Walkover
- r = Retired
- d = Defaulted

=== Final ===
Final

1
- (United States) **Martina Navratilova**
- (United States) **Pam Shriver**
**6**
**6**

6
- (Australia) Elizabeth Smylie
- (Australia) Wendy Turnbull
3
3

=== Top half ===
First round

Second round

Quarter-finals

Semi-finals

1
- (United States) **M Navratilova**
- (United States) **P Shriver**
**6**
**6**

- (United States) L Antonoplis
- (United States) K Horvath
4
3

- (Netherlands) C Bakkum
- (Netherlands) B Schultz
1
3

- (Netherlands) **C Bakkum**
- (Netherlands) **B Schultz**
**6**
**6**

1
- (United States) **M Navratilova**
- (United States) **P Shriver**
**6**
**6**

- (United States) B Bowes
- (United States) S Collins
4
1

7
- (Australia) J Byrne
- (Australia) J Tremelling
1
2

- (United States) **E Burgin**
- (Australia) **H Mandlíková**
**6**
**6**

- (United States) E Burgin
- (Australia) H Mandlíková
**6**
3
1

- (West Germany) C Porwik
- (France) C Tanvier
0
**6**
6

7
- (Australia) **J Byrne**
- (Australia) **J Tremelling**
4
**6**
**6**

7
- (Australia) **J Byrne**
- (Australia) **J Tremelling**
**6**
4
**7**

1
- (United States) **M Navratilova**
- (United States) **P Shriver**
**6**
**6**

- (Poland) I Kuczyńska
- (Austria) J Wiesner
3
6

4
- (United States) **P Fendick**
- (Canada) **J Hetherington**
**6**
**6**

- (Australia) L Field
- (Australia) M Jaggard
1
2

- (New Zealand) B Cordwell
- (South Africa) D Van Rensburg
2
4

- (New Zealand) **B Cordwell**
- (South Africa) **D Van Rensburg**
**6**
**6**

4
- (United States) P Fendick
- (Canada) J Hetherington
3
6

- (Australia) M Bowrey
- (Australia) L O'Neill
4
3

- (Poland) **I Kuczyńska**
- (Austria) **J Wiesner**
**6**
**7**

- (Poland) **I Kuczyńska**
- (Austria) **J Wiesner**
**6**
**6**

- (Poland) **I Kuczyńska**
- (Austria) **J Wiesner**
3
**7**
**6**

- (United States) B Herr
- (Hungary) A Temesvári
3
5

5
- (United States) K Adams
- (West Germany) E Pfaff
**6**
6
4

5
- (United States) **K Adams**
- (West Germany) **E Pfaff**
**6**
**7**

=== Bottom half ===
First round

Second round

Quarter-finals

Semi-finals

8
- (United States) **T Phelps**
- (Italy) **R Reggi**
**6**
**6**

- (United States) Ca MacGregor
- (United States) Cy MacGregor
4
4

8
- (United States) **T Phelps**
- (Italy) **R Reggi**
**7**
**7**

- (Netherlands) **M Bollegraf**
- (Australia) **N Provis**
**7**
**6**

- (Netherlands) M Bollegraf
- (Australia) N Provis
6
6

- (Sweden) C Lindqvist
- (New Zealand) J Richardson
6
3

8
- (United States) T Phelps
- (Italy) R Reggi
6
3

- (France) A Dechaume
- (France) N Herreman
3
3

- (United States) **A Henricksson**
- (United States) **G Magers**
**7**
**6**

- (United States) **A Henricksson**
- (United States) **G Magers**
**6**
**6**

- (United States) **A Henricksson**
- (United States) **G Magers**
**6**
**6**

LL
- (Switzerland) E Krapl
- (Czechoslovakia) P Langrová
2
2

- (United States) A Henricksson
- (United States) G Magers
2
3

6
- (Australia) **E Smylie**
- (Australia) **W Turnbull**
6
**6**
**6**

6
- (Australia) **E Smylie**
- (Australia) **W Turnbull**
**6**
**6**

- (United Kingdom) J Durie
- (United States) A Smith
**7**
4
2

6
- (Australia) **E Smylie**
- (Australia) **W Turnbull**
**6**
**6**

- (Australia) J-A Faull
- (Australia) R McQuillan
6
2

- (Czechoslovakia) I Budařová
- (United States) M J Fernández
2
1

- (Czechoslovakia) **I Budařová**
- (United States) **M J Fernández**
**7**
**6**

6
- (Australia) **E Smylie**
- (Australia) **W Turnbull**
**6**
3
**6**

- (West Germany) S Hanika
- (West Germany) C Kohde-Kilsch
6
6

2
- (Czechoslovakia) J Novotná
- (Czechoslovakia) H Suková
3
**6**
3

- (South Africa) **L Gregory**
- (United States) **R Reis**
**7**
**7**

- (South Africa) L Gregory
- (United States) R Reis
**6**
2
2

2
- (Czechoslovakia) **J Novotná**
- (Czechoslovakia) **H Suková**
3
**6**
**6**
