= 1988 New South Wales Open =

- Date: 4–11 January
- Edition: 96th
- Surface: Grass / outdoor
- Location: Sydney, Australia
- Venue: White City Stadium

Champions

Men's singles
- (Australia) John Fitzgerald

Women's singles
- (United States) Pam Shriver

Men's doubles
- (Australia) Darren Cahill / (Australia) Mark Kratzmann

Women's doubles
- (United States) Ann Henricksson / (Switzerland) Christiane Jolissaint
← 1987 ·	New South Wales Open	· 1989 →

The 1988 New South Wales Open was a tennis tournament played on grass courts at the White City Stadium in Sydney in Australia that was part of the 1988 Nabisco Grand Prix and of Tier IV of the 1988 WTA Tour. The tournament ran from 4 January through 11 January 1988.

== Finals ==
=== Men's singles ===
(Australia) John Fitzgerald defeated (Soviet Union) Andrei Chesnokov 6–3, 6–4

- It was Fitzgerald's 1st title of the year and the 18th of his career.

=== Women's singles ===
(United States) Pam Shriver defeated (Czechoslovakia) Helena Suková 6–2, 6–3

- It was Shriver's 3rd title of the year and the 106th of her career.

=== Men's doubles ===
(Australia) Darren Cahill / (Australia) Mark Kratzmann defeated (United States) Joey Rive / (United States) Bud Schultz 7–6, 6–4

- It was Cahill's 2nd title of the year and the 4th of his career. It was Kratzmann's 2nd title of the year and the 5th of his career.

=== Women's doubles ===
(United States) Ann Henricksson / (Switzerland) Christiane Jolissaint defeated (West Germany) Claudia Kohde-Kilsch / (Czechoslovakia) Helena Suková 7–6, 4–6, 6–3

- It was Henricksson's 1st title of the year and the 1st of her career. It was Jolissaint's 1st title of the year and the 4th of her career.
