= 1990 Holden NSW Open =

- Date: 8–14 January
- Edition: 98th
- Category: World Series (men); Tier III (women)
- Surface: Hard / outdoor
- Location: Sydney, Australia
- Venue: White City Stadium

Champions

Men's singles
- (France) Yannick Noah

Women's singles
- (Soviet Union) Natasha Zvereva

Men's doubles
- (Australia) Pat Cash / (Australia) Mark Kratzmann

Women's doubles
- (Czechoslovakia) Jana Novotná / (Czechoslovakia) Helena Suková
- NSW Open

The 1990 Holden NSW Open (known as such in 1990 for sponsorship reasons) was a combined men's and women's tennis tournament played on outdoor hard courts. It was the 98th edition (the 22nd edition in the Open Era) of the event known that year as the Holden New South Wales (NSW) Open, and was part of the ATP World Series of the 1990 ATP Tour, and the WTA Tier III tournaments of the 1990 WTA Tour. It took place at the White City Stadium in Sydney, Australia, from 8 to 14 January 1990. Yannick Noah and Natasha Zvereva won the singles titles.

== Finals ==
=== Men's singles ===
(France) Yannick Noah defeated (West Germany) Carl-Uwe Steeb, 5–7, 6–3, 6–4

- It was Noah's first singles title of the year and the 23rd, and last, of his career.

=== Women's singles ===
(Soviet Union) Natasha Zvereva defeated (Austria) Barbara Paulus, 4–6, 6–1, 6–3

- It was Zvereva's second singles title of the year, and of her career.

=== Men's doubles ===
(Australia) Pat Cash / (Australia) Mark Kratzmann defeated (South Africa) Pieter Aldrich / (South Africa) Danie Visser, 6–4, 7–5

- It was Cash's first doubles title of the year, and the 10th of his career.
- It was Kratzmann's first doubles title of the year, and the ninth of his career.

=== Women's doubles ===
(Czechoslovakia) Jana Novotná / (Czechoslovakia) Helena Suková defeated (Soviet Union) Larisa Savchenko / (Soviet Union) Natasha Zvereva, 6–3, 7–5

- It was Novotná's second doubles title of the year, and the 16th of her career.
- It was Suková's second doubles title of the year, and the 33rd of her career.
