= 1988 New South Wales Open – Women's singles =

Women's singles
- 1988 New South Wales Open
- 1987 Champion: (United States) Zina Garrison

Final
- Champion: (United States) Pam Shriver
- Runner-up: (Czechoslovakia) Helena Suková
- Score: 6–2, 6–3

Details
- Draw: 56
- Seeds: 16

Events
Singles	men	women
Doubles	men	women
- New South Wales Open

Zina Garrison was the defending champion but did not compete that year.

Pam Shriver won in the final 6–2, 6–3 against Helena Suková.

== Seeds ==
A champion seed is indicated in bold text while text in italics indicates the round in which that seed was eliminated. The top eight seeds received a bye to the second round.

1. (United States) **Pam Shriver (champion)**
2. (Czechoslovakia) Helena Suková (final)
3. (West Germany) Claudia Kohde-Kilsch (semifinals)
4. (West Germany) Sylvia Hanika (second round)
5. (Sweden) Catarina Lindqvist (quarterfinals)
6. n/a
7. (Australia) Elizabeth Smylie (second round)
8. (Japan) Etsuko Inoue (quarterfinals)
9. (South Africa) Rosalyn Fairbank (second round)
10. (Australia) Anne Minter (third round)
11. (West Germany) Eva Pfaff (first round)
12. (Czechoslovakia) Jana Novotná (third round)
13. (United States) Marianne Werdel (second round)
14. (United States) Ann Henricksson (third round)
15. n/a
16. n/a

== Draw ==
Key

- Q = Qualifier
- WC = Wild card
- LL = Lucky loser
- Alt = Alternate
- ITF = ITF entry
- PR = Protected ranking
- SR = Special ranking
- SE = Special exempt
- JE = Junior exempt
- JR = Junior Accelerator Programme entrant
- CO = College Accelerator Programme entrant
- NG = Next Gen Accelerator Program entrant
- w/o = Walkover
- r = Retired
- d = Defaulted

=== Finals ===
Semifinals
1	(United States) **Pam Shriver**	**7**	**6**
3	(West Germany) Claudia Kohde-Kilsch	5	2
(United States) Patty Fendick	6	1
2	(Czechoslovakia) **Helena Suková**	**7**	**6**

Final
1	(United States) **Pam Shriver**	**6**	**6**
2	(Czechoslovakia) Helena Suková	2	3

=== Top half ===
==== Section 1 ====
First round
Q	(Canada) J Hetherington	1	**6**	1
(United Kingdom) **S Gomer**	**6**	1	**6**
(West Germany) **W Probst**	4	**6**	**7**
LL	(Netherlands) H ter Riet	**6**	3	6
(France) A Dechaume	3	**6**	4
(United States) **T Mochizuki**	**6**	1	**6**
10	(Australia) **A Minter**	**6**	**6**
Q	(Australia) A Scott	3	1
(Australia) M Jaggard	5	2
(Australia) **L O'Neill**	**7**	**6**
(Australia) **J Tremelling**	**7**	**6**
Q	(United States) D-A Hansel	5	2

Second round
1	(United States) **P Shriver**	6	**7**	**6**
(United Kingdom) S Gomer	**7**	5	2
(West Germany) **W Probst**	1	**6**	**6**
(United States) T Mochizuki	**6**	3	2
10	(Australia) **A Minter**	**6**	**6**
(Australia) L O'Neill	1	4
(Australia) J Tremelling	**6**	4	2
5	(Sweden) **C Lindqvist**	4	**6**	**6**

Third round
1	(United States) **P Shriver**	**6**	**6**
(West Germany) W Probst	1	2
10	(Australia) A Minter	3	6
5	(Sweden) **C Lindqvist**	**6**	**7**

Quarterfinals
1	(United States) **P Shriver**	**6**	**6**
5	(Sweden) C Lindqvist	4	1

==== Section 2 ====
First round
(United States) Ca MacGregor	3	**6**	3
(Belgium) **S Wasserman**	**6**	4	**6**
(France) P Paradis	3	4
(France) **C Suire**	**6**	**6**
Q	(New Zealand) J Richardson	6	4
12	(Czechoslovakia) **J Novotná**	**7**	**6**
14	(United States) **A Henricksson**	**6**	**6**
(Australia) E Minter	0	2
Q	(United States) Cy MacGregor	2	5
Q	(Japan) **M Yanagi**	**6**	**7**
(Australia) L Field	**6**	3	3
(United States) **B Nagelsen**	3	**6**	**6**

Second round
3	(West Germany) **C Kohde-Kilsch**	**6**	**6**
(Belgium) S Wasserman	3	2
(France) C Suire	2	6
12	(Czechoslovakia) **J Novotná**	**6**	**7**
14	(United States) **A Henricksson**	**7**	4	**6**
Q	(Japan) M Yanagi	5	**6**	4
(United States) B Nagelsen	6	3
8	(Japan) **E Inoue**	**7**	**6**

Third round
3	(West Germany) **C Kohde-Kilsch**	**6**	**6**
12	(Czechoslovakia) J Novotná	4	3
14	(United States) A Henricksson	4	**6**	2
8	(Japan) **E Inoue**	**6**	2	**6**

Quarterfinals
3	(West Germany) **C Kohde-Kilsch**	**6**	**6**
8	(Japan) E Inoue	2	3

=== Bottom half ===
==== Section 3 ====
First round
(United States) **P Fendick**	**6**	3	**6**
(Australia) N Provis	4	**6**	4
(Australia) K Radford	4	**6**	4
(United States) **H Ludloff**	**6**	2	**6**
(Switzerland) **C Jolissaint**	**6**	4	**7**
(France) J Halard	3	**6**	5
11	(West Germany) E Pfaff	**6**	5	6
(New Zealand) **B Cordwell**	4	**7**	**7**
(Belgium) **A Devries**	**7**	**7**
(United States) C Benjamin	6	5
(France) E Derly	4	**7**	5
Q	(Netherlands) **B Schultz**	**6**	6	**7**

Second round
LL	(United Kingdom) J Salmon	2	0
(United States) **P Fendick**	**6**	**6**
(United States) H Ludloff	6	**6**	2
(Switzerland) **C Jolissaint**	**7**	1	**6**
(New Zealand) **B Cordwell**	**6**	**6**
(Belgium) A Devries	2	2
Q	(Netherlands) **B Schultz**	**6**	**6**
4	(West Germany) S Hanika	4	4

Third round
(United States) **P Fendick**	**6**	**6**
(Switzerland) C Jolissaint	1	2
(New Zealand) B Cordwell	**6**	2	6
Q	(Netherlands) **B Schultz**	4	**6**	**7**

Quarterfinals
(United States) **P Fendick**	**6**	**7**
Q	(Netherlands) B Schultz	3	5

==== Section 4 ====
First round
(Sweden) **M Lindström**	4	**6**	**6**
(Netherlands) M Bollegraf	**6**	2	1
Q	(Netherlands) **H Witvoet**	**6**	**6**
(United States) S Walsh-Pete	3	1
(Czechoslovakia) R Zrubáková	6	6
9	(South Africa) **R Fairbank**	**7**	**7**
13	(United States) **M Werdel**	**6**	5	**6**
(France) C Tanvier	4	**7**	4
(Switzerland) E Krapl	6	3
(United Kingdom) **J Durie**	**7**	**6**
(United States) A M Fernandez	6	2
(Australia) **R McQuillan**	**7**	**6**

Second round
7	(Australia) E Smylie	2	3
(Sweden) **M Lindström**	**6**	**6**
Q	(Netherlands) **H Witvoet**	**6**	6	**6**
9	(South Africa) R Fairbank	3	**7**	3
13	(United States) M Werdel	4	1
(United Kingdom) **J Durie**	**6**	**6**
(Australia) R McQuillan	5	2
2	(Czechoslovakia) **H Suková**	**7**	**6**

Third round
(Sweden) M Lindström	2	**7**	6
Q	(Netherlands) **H Witvoet**	**6**	6	**7**
(United Kingdom) J Durie	3	3
2	(Czechoslovakia) **H Suková**	**6**	**6**

Quarterfinals
Q	(Netherlands) H Witvoet	2	2
2	(Czechoslovakia) **H Suková**	**6**	**6**
