= 1989 New South Wales Open =

- Date: 9–15 January
- Edition: 97th
- Surface: Hard / outdoor
- Location: Sydney, Australia
- Venue: White City Stadium

Champions

Men's singles
- (United States) Aaron Krickstein

Women's singles
- (United States) Martina Navratilova

Men's doubles
- (Australia) Darren Cahill / (Australia) Wally Masur

Women's doubles
- (United States) Martina Navratilova / (United States) Pam Shriver
← 1988 ·	New South Wales Open	· 1990 →

The 1989 New South Wales Open was a tennis tournament played on outdoor hard courts at the White City Stadium in Sydney in Australia that was part of the 1989 Nabisco Grand Prix and of Tier IV of the 1989 WTA Tour. It was the 97th edition of the tournament (the 21st in the Open Era) and was held from 9 through 15 January 1989.

== Finals ==
=== Men's singles ===
(United States) Aaron Krickstein defeated (Soviet Union) Andrei Cherkasov 6–4, 6–2

- It was Krickstein's 1st title of the year and the 5th of his career.

=== Women's singles ===
(United States) Martina Navratilova defeated (Sweden) Catarina Lindqvist 6–2, 6–4

- It was Navrátilová's 1st title of the year and the 282nd of her career.

=== Men's doubles ===
(Australia) Darren Cahill / (Australia) Wally Masur defeated (South Africa) Pieter Aldrich / (South Africa) Danie Visser 6–4, 6–3

- It was Cahill's 1st title of the year and the 8th of his career. It was Masur's 1st title of the year and the 11th of his career.

=== Women's doubles ===
(United States) Martina Navratilova / (United States) Pam Shriver defeated (Australia) Elizabeth Smylie / (Australia) Wendy Turnbull 6–3, 6–3

- It was Navratilova's 2nd title of the year and the 283rd of her career. It was Shriver's 1st title of the year and the 117th of her career.
