= 1987 Family Circle NSW Open =

- Date: 5–11 January
- Edition: 95th
- Category: Category 3
- Draw: 56S / 32D
- Prize money: $150,000
- Surface: Grass
- Location: Sydney, Australia
- Venue: White City Stadium

Champions

Singles
- (United States) Zina Garrison

Doubles
- (United States) Betsy Nagelsen / (Australia) Elizabeth Smylie
- Sydney International

The 1987 Family Circle NSW Open was a women's tennis tournament played on outdoor grass courts at the White City Stadium in Sydney, Australia that was part of the Category 3 tier of the 1987 Virginia Slims World Championship Series. It was the 95th edition of the tournament and was held from 5 January until 11 January 1987. Sixth-seeded Zina Garrison won the singles title.

== Finals ==
=== Singles ===
(United States) Zina Garrison defeated (United States) Pam Shriver 6–2, 6–4

- It was Garrison's 1st singles title of the year and the 5th of her career.

=== Doubles ===
(United States) Betsy Nagelsen / (Australia) Elizabeth Smylie defeated (Australia) Jenny Byrne / (Australia) Janine Tremelling 6–7^{(5–7)}, 7–5, 6–1
