= 1991 Holden NSW Open =

- Date: 7–13 January
- Edition: 99th
- Category: World Series (men); Tier III (women)
- Surface: Hard / outdoor
- Location: Sydney, Australia
- Venue: White City Stadium

Champions

Men's singles
- (France) Guy Forget

Women's singles
- (Czechoslovakia) Jana Novotná

Men's doubles
- (United States) Scott Davis / (United States) David Pate

Women's doubles
- (Spain) Arantxa Sánchez Vicario / (Czechoslovakia) Helena Suková
- NSW Open

The 1991 Holden NSW Open, known as such in 1991 for sponsorship reasons, was a combined men's and women's tennis tournament played on outdoor hard courts. It was the 99th edition of the event and was part of the World Series of the 1991 ATP Tour, and the Tier III of the 1991 WTA Tour. The tournament took place at the White City Stadium in Sydney, Australia, from 7 January until 14 January 1991. Guy Forget and Jana Novotná won the singles titles.

== Finals ==
=== Men's singles ===
(France) Guy Forget defeated (West Germany) Michael Stich, 6–3, 6–4

- It was Forget's 1st singles title of the year and the 4th of his career.

=== Women's singles ===
(Czechoslovakia) Jana Novotná defeated (Spain) Arantxa Sánchez Vicario, 6–4, 6–2

- It was Novotná's 1st singles title of the year and the 4th of her career.

=== Men's doubles ===
(United States) Scott Davis / (United States) David Pate defeated (Australia) Darren Cahill / (Australia) Mark Kratzmann, 3–6, 6–3, 6–2

- It was Davis's 1st doubles title of the year and the 16th of his career. It was Pate's 1st doubles title of the year and the 15th of his career.

=== Women's doubles ===
(Spain) Arantxa Sánchez Vicario / (Czechoslovakia) Helena Suková defeated (United States) Gigi Fernández / (Czechoslovakia) Jana Novotná, 6–1, 6–4

- It was Sánchez Vicario's 1st doubles title of the year and the 6th of her career. It was Suková's 1st doubles title of the year and the 42nd of her career.
