= Paul Jans =

Dutch footballer (born 1981)

Personal information
- Date of birth: 5 August 1981 (age 45)
- Place of birth: Veghel, Netherlands
- Height: 1.93 m (6 ft 4 in)
- Position: Striker

Youth career
- 1987–1992: RKKV Keldonk
- 1992–1995: Sparta '25
- 1995–2000: VVV

Senior career*
Years	Team	Apps	(Gls)
2000–2007	VVV-Venlo	158	(33)
2006–2007	→ NEC (loan)	8	(1)
2008	Rot-Weiss Essen	9	(0)
2008–2010	Den Bosch	16	(5)
2010–2011	Dender	29	(8)
2011–2012	De Treffers	22	(7)
2012–2013	Venray		
2013–2021	Kwiek Venlo		
- * Club domestic league appearances and goals

Paul Jans (born 5 August 1981) is a Dutch former professional footballer who played as a striker.

== Career ==
Born in Veghel and raised in Keldonk, Jans started playing football at RKVV Keldonk, where his goal-scoring ability stood out from a young age. At 11, he moved to Sparta '25 in Beek en Donk, where his performances earned him attention from professional club VVV-Venlo. Jans joined VVV at 14, but his progress was hindered by injuries, including a broken wrist and a serious ankle injury that kept him sidelined for over a year. Despite these setbacks, Jans regained his form and played in multiple positions, including forward, midfielder, and centre-back, helping to improve his versatility.

In October 2000, Jans made his first-team debut for VVV, replacing Maurice Graef in a 1–0 home win against Eindhoven, and by the following season, he was a regular starter. However, he struggled to maintain a consistent spot in the starting lineup, with the club frequently seeking alternatives in the forward position. Despite this, Jans continued to contribute regularly, earning a place in the team each season.

After six seasons and 158 league appearances, Jans was loaned to NEC in 2006 following a dispute with VVV's management. Although NEC had an option to buy, they opted not to exercise it, and Jans returned to VVV for the 2007–08 season.

In January 2008, Jans moved to Rot-Weiss Essen for six months, before signing a two-year contract with Den Bosch. In the summer of 2010, he initially planned to join Dijkse Boys in the Topklasse, but instead secured a move to Dender in Belgium. The following season, Jans played for De Treffers in the Topklasse before moving to SV Venray. In 2013, he joined Quick Boys/Venlo, later renamed Kwiek Venlo, where he ended his playing career when the club folded in 2021.

== Style of play ==
Jans was known for his physicality and versatility, using his size to excel in aerial duels. While his playing style lacked technical flair, he was primarily a forward but also played in midfield and defence, showcasing his adaptability. Though not the most technically gifted, Jans compensated with strong tactical awareness, work rate, and determination.

== Personal life ==
In 2016, Jans' stalker, a 54-year-old woman from 's-Hertogenbosch, was sentenced to a conditional prison term of five months.
