= BAS World =

Dutch Automotive company

- Type: Private
- Industry: Automotive
- Founded: 1992
- Headquarters: Veghel, The Netherlands
- Website: www.basworld.com

BAS World also known as Brabant Automobile Service is a Dutch company that offers a platform to buy and sell commercial vehicles machinery and equipment.

== History ==
BAS World was started in 1992 when BAS Trucks were created and in the following year multiple subgroups were added. In 2021 the name "BAS World" was created for all the sub categories. BAS World is headquartered in Veghel, The Netherlands and operates as a subsidiary of BAS Group.

Since 1962 the main owner of BAS was Martin van Heertum. The sons Casper and Bas van Heertum worked for the company from 1992. However, when the disaster struck in 2000 and their father died of an intracerebral hemorrhage, the brothers decided to continue the business and took over the company. Originally founded 60 years ago as Brabant Automobile Service, the company has evolved significantly through comprehensive digitalization.

== Business model ==
BAS World provides a platform where sellers can showcase their vehicles and equipment to an international audience of potential buyers. Simultaneously, it enables buyers to explore and compare a wide range of commercial vehicles and equipment from around the world, granting them access to an extensive selection of options.
