= Dijkse Boys =

- Full name: Voetbalvereniging Dijkse Boys
- Founded: 1948
- Dissolved: 2013
- Ground: Sportpark Berckendonk; Helmond
- Capacity: 1,500
- Chairman: Hans van de Vijfeijken
- Manager: Wim Swinkels
- League: Eerste Klasse
- 2012–13: Eerste Klasse
Home colours

Dijkse Boys was a Dutch amateur association football club from Helmond.

The club was founded on May 8, 1948, and has played at amateur level in all its history, making it the second team in the town after professional crosstown rivals Helmond Sport. The club was part of the Hoofdklasse league in the 2009–10 season, completing it in fifth place in the Sunday B group, and then winning promotion to the newly established Topklasse league for the inaugural 2010–11 season through playoffs.

After a few months into the 2010–11 season, the main sponsor withdrew, leaving Dijkse Boys in financial trouble. In the turmoil, the club lost a KNVB Cup match against SC Genemuiden 1–9. The day after the defeat, Dijkse Boys decided to withdraw from the Topklasse because of financial problems.

The club was relegated to Hoofdklasse in 2011. In 2012 the club started new season in the Eerste Klasse. It folded in January 2013.

== Current squad ==
2010–11 season
Note: Flags indicate national team as defined under FIFA eligibility rules; some limited exceptions apply. Players may hold more than one non-FIFA nationality.

No.	Pos.	Nation	Player
—	GK	NED	Jaap Janssen
—	GK	NED	Ariën Pietersma
—	MF	NED	Yusuf Altunel
—	MF	NED	Abdes Assouiki
—	MF	NED	Danny van Bakel
—	MF	NED	Gokan Balci
—	FW	NED	Youssef Chida
—	DF	NED	Eltjo Gnodde
—	FW	NED	Paul Jans
—	MF	NED	Gaetan Klaassen

No.	Pos.	Nation	Player
—	DF	NED	Wouter Lamers
—	FW	NED	Robbie Lutgens
—	FW	NED	Mathijs van der Meijden
—	FW	NED	Jihad Ouchene
—	MF	NED	Tom Timmermans
—	FW	ANT	Nyron Wau
—	DF	NED	Antoine Wellens
—	DF	NED	William van de Wetering
—	FW	NED	Freek Winckens
—	DF	NED	Serginho Zwennicker
