= VV Alverna =

Dutch football club

- Full name: Voetbalvereniging Alverna
- Founded: 14 May 1950; 74 years ago
- Ground: Sportpark Bospad, Wijchen
- League: Saturday Vierde Klasse A (East) (2024–25)
- Website: vvalverna.com
Home colours

Voetbalvereniging Alverna, commonly known as VV Alverna, is a football club based in the village of Alverna, Gelderland, Netherlands, whose main team competes in the Vierde Klasse, the ninth tier of the Dutch football league system. Founded on 14 May 1950, the team plays its home matches at the Sportpark Bospad in nearby Wijchen.

== History ==
In 1936, the football club Alverna was founded by Franciscan friars from the Alverna monastery, continuing a legacy of earlier clubs such as "AVE," "Helios," and "Alvernia." Following World War II, organisational challenges led to a merger in 1945 with Eendracht from Wijchen, forming the Alverna Wijchen Combination (SV AWC). This partnership ended in 1948, with Eendracht continuing as AWC. In 1950, the current club was re-established as RKVV Alverna.

The club's pinnacle achievement came in the 2012–13 season when it won the Eerste Klasse championship in the East district (1E). This victory marked Alverna as the first club from Wijchen to reach the Hoofdklasse, then the second tier of amateur football. Alverna competed in Sunday Hoofdklasse C for one season (2013–14). The club returned for two additional seasons in the Hoofdklasse, during 2015–16 and 2016–17, which was then the third amateur tier.

On 27 January 2017, RKVV Alverna transitioned into a multisport organisation, Sportclub Alverna. The club now includes VV Alverna (football), BC Alverna (billiards), and DC Alverna (darts).

In March 2022, Alverna announced its withdrawal from Sunday football's Eerste Klasse, shifting its focus to the Saturday team competing in the ninth-tier Vierde Klasse. According to chairman Dave Spithoven, the club planned to restart Sunday football in the lowest tier, the Vijfde Klasse, emphasising local talent and community values over competitive goals.
