= Erp, Netherlands =

Erp
- Village
- St. Servatius Church in Erp, 1844

- Flag Coat of arms

- Location in the province of North Brabant in the Netherlands Erp (Netherlands)
- Coordinates: 51°36′0″N 5°36′26″E
- Country: Netherlands
- Province: North Brabant
- Municipality: Meierijstad
- Incorporated: 1300
- Market rights: 1789
- Annexed: 1994

Area
  - Total: 6.20 km^{2} (2.39 sq mi)
- Elevation: 11 m (36 ft)

Population (2021)
  - Total: 1,800
  - Density: 290/km^{2} (750/sq mi)
- Demonym: Erpenaar
- Time zone: UTC+1 (CET)
  - Summer (DST): UTC+2 (CEST)
- Postal code: 5469
- Dialing code: 0413
- Major roads: N279

Erp (Dutch pronunciation: [ˈɛr(ə)p]) is a village in southern Netherlands, in the province of North Brabant between 's-Hertogenbosch and Eindhoven. Prior to 1994, Erp was a municipality consisting of the town of Erp and the villages of Boerdonk and Keldonk. In that year, the municipality was merged with the municipality of Veghel to form one municipality under the latter name. The area of the former municipality of Erp has a population of 6,663, while Veghel has a population of 37,655.

The municipality of Veghel, which merged into the new municipality of Meierijstad in 2017, consisted of the towns of Veghel and Erp, and the villages of Boerdonk, Keldonk, Mariaheide, Zijtaart and Eerde. Veghel is 5 km northwest of Erp and other neighboring towns, including Uden (north), Boekel (east), Gemert (southeast), Beek en Donk (south) and Sint-Oedenrode (west).

Erp's town hall dates from 1791. It lost its main function when Erp was annexed to Veghel. Both the town hall and the Saint Servatius Church are on the national list of historic preservation.

== History ==
The earliest traces of habitation in Erp and its immediate surroundings are found on the town's southeast side, on the road to Gemert near the river Aa. According to A. Meuwese, local farmers found several funerary vessels there from around 300 B.C. in the early 20th century.

Gallic tribes that inhabited the region placed the ashes and remains of their deceased in these vessels and buried them in the many funerary fields, and some of these fields were in this area. Meuwese also mentions that a small “heathen” temple supposedly stood at a former bend in the Aa that has since been swallowed by the river. A local legend says that on Christmas night one can hear church bells ring there. Similar stories have been reported near other funerary fields.

Traces of Roman pottery have also been found around Erp. The Roman items are of a later period than the Gallic and are recognizable by their thickness and curled edges.

The area around Erp was inhabited by the Menapii tribe, who roamed the area south of the Rhine, north of the Ardennes; and the Morini tribe, north and west of the Eburones tribe, west of the Meuse, and east of the North Sea.

The earliest specific reference to Erp is from the 12th century, where it is referred to as the property of a noble family. Earlier records, dating from 1134, mention Erthepe, which is assumed to be Erp. The parish's first priest is mentioned in 1360, when Erp was part of the Duchy of Brabant.

In 1579, seven Northern Dutch provinces declared their independence, while Brabant remained part of the Spain of Philip II, son of Holy Roman Emperor Charles V.

In 1648, the Peace of Westphalia concluded the Eighty Years' War (Tachtigjarige Oorlog) of the Northern Dutch provinces against the Habsburgs. Brabant was separated and the current North Brabant was incorporated in the newly established, independent country of the Netherlands; while the larger southern parts of Antwerp and Brabant remained under Spanish Habsburg rule until 1713.

After the ravages of the French Revolution and Napoleonic Europe, at the Congress of Vienna in 1815, Brabant was reunited in the newly established Kingdom of the Netherlands. This lasted only until 1830, when Belgium declared its independence from the Netherlands and Brabant was divided between the two countries.

In 1940 Erp was occupied by German troops. In 1944, paratroopers participating in the largest airborne operation in history, Operation Market Garden, liberated Erp and its surroundings. The liberated strip from Eindhoven to Arnhem was later nicknamed Hell's Highway.

== Municipality of Erp ==
Town Hall of Erp (1791)

Before 1994, the municipality of Erp included the villages of Boerdonk and Keldonk and a few hamlets like Rijkerbeek and Stinkhoek. In that year, the Netherlands government merged Erp and the two villages with the municipality of Veghel. The area remained a cadastral municipality, however; and in 2008, following the introduction of several new cadastral laws, the area of the former municipality of Erp became also an official town with exactly the same borders as the former municipality.

As of 1 January 2014, the populations of the town and villages are:

Erp	4,683
Keldonk	1,205
Boerdonk	775

== Saint Servatius Church ==
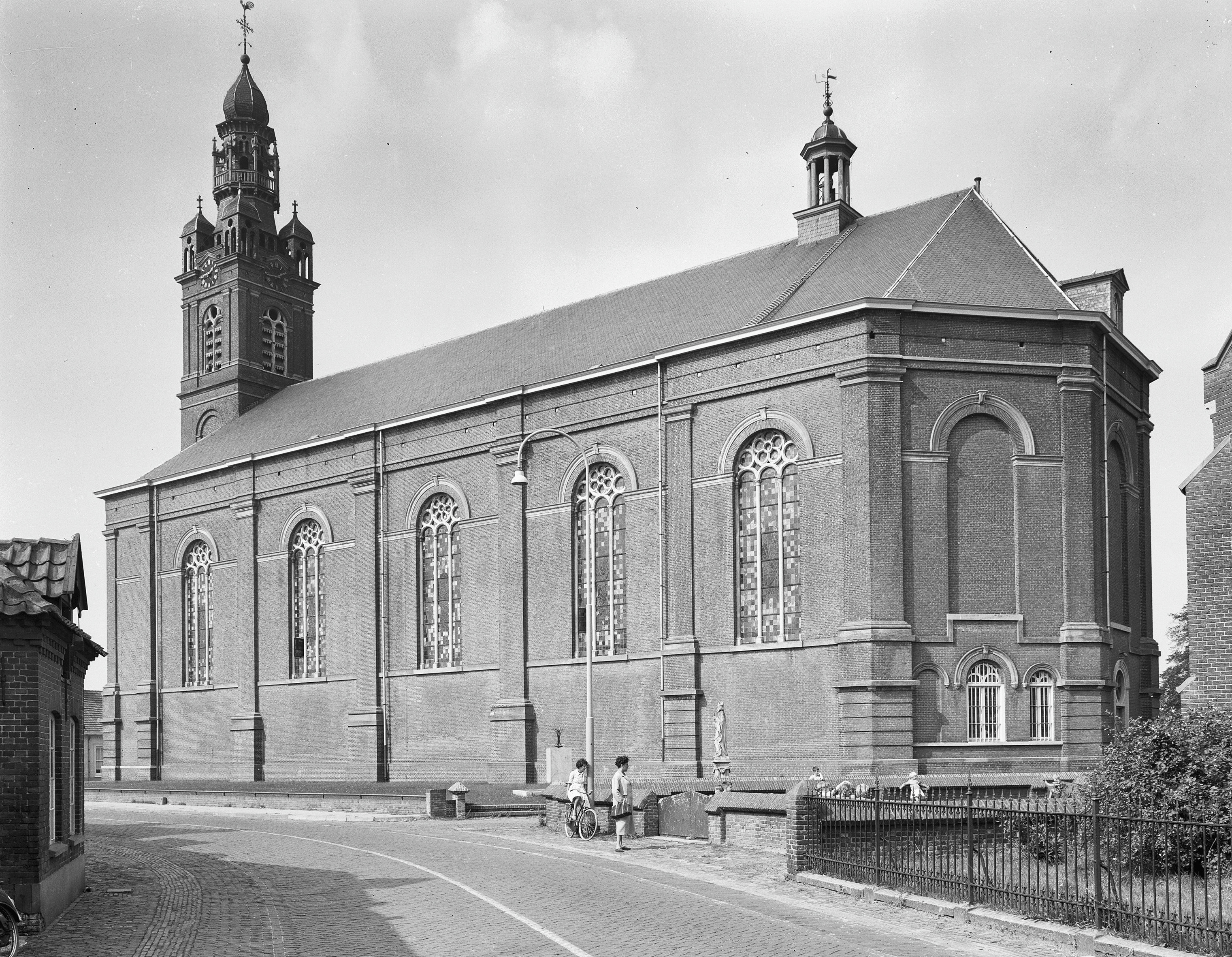
St. Servatius Church, Erp

The existing Saint Servatius Church in Erp was built in 1844, but it belies the real age of the village's parish. The old church was demolished in 1843, after nearly 150 years of neglect in the care of the village's few Protestants from 1648 to around 1800 when Catholicism was banned in the Dutch Republic.

The oldest surviving clues from the church's past are two church bells. The larger and older of the two (height 88 cm; diameter 108 cm) carries the inscription: “I am called Maria. In the year of the Lord 1381.” The smaller and younger (height 81 cm; diameter 96 cm) is inscribed with: “I am called Katrina. In the year of the Lord 1412.” The age of the bells makes them rare in the area and they narrowly avoided confiscation in 1942, during the German occupation.

There are two known drawings of the old Saint Servatius Church: a somewhat romanticized pen drawing by the hand of Hendrik Spilman (1721–1784); and a sketch dated September 13, 1788, by the hand of architect Hendrik Verhees (1744–1813), who designed the town hall of Erp in 1791.

In the fifteenth and sixteenth centuries, simple masonry churches with a nave and two aisles were built in a regional variant of the late-Gothic style throughout the Campine. Judging from the drawings, the church in Erp shares many characteristics of this Campine Gothic style, which appears in a sense rural without its use of the elaborate Gothic decorations as seen in northern France. The most characteristic element of these Campine Gothic churches is the monumental brick bell tower or steeple with heavy-set diagonal buttresses on all four corners, examples of which can still be found throughout the region.

During the Napoleonic era, the Church was handed back to the Catholics, but only after a fierce dispute with the Protestants living in Erp.

The current Saint Servatius Church was finished in 1844 and is a so-called waterstaat church, designed by architect Arnoldus van Veggel in a neo-Classical style. The spire of the steeple was designed by famous architect Pierre Cuypers, after the original was destroyed by a fire caused by lightning in 1895. Cuypers also redesigned the interior around 1880. From then, the interior took after the neo-Gothic style and was painted with biblical scenes.

One of the most notable items in the church is the organ, dating from 1848. J.J. Vollebregt built the organ and the organ housing was built by H. Meijers and the sculptures of David, Caecilia and the angels, as well as the balustrade decorating the balcony, were created by J.P. van den Mark.

In 1951, the entire church interior was painted gray. A couple of decades later, in 1991, the interior was partially restored to the style of 1844, and partially restored to the style of Cuypers.

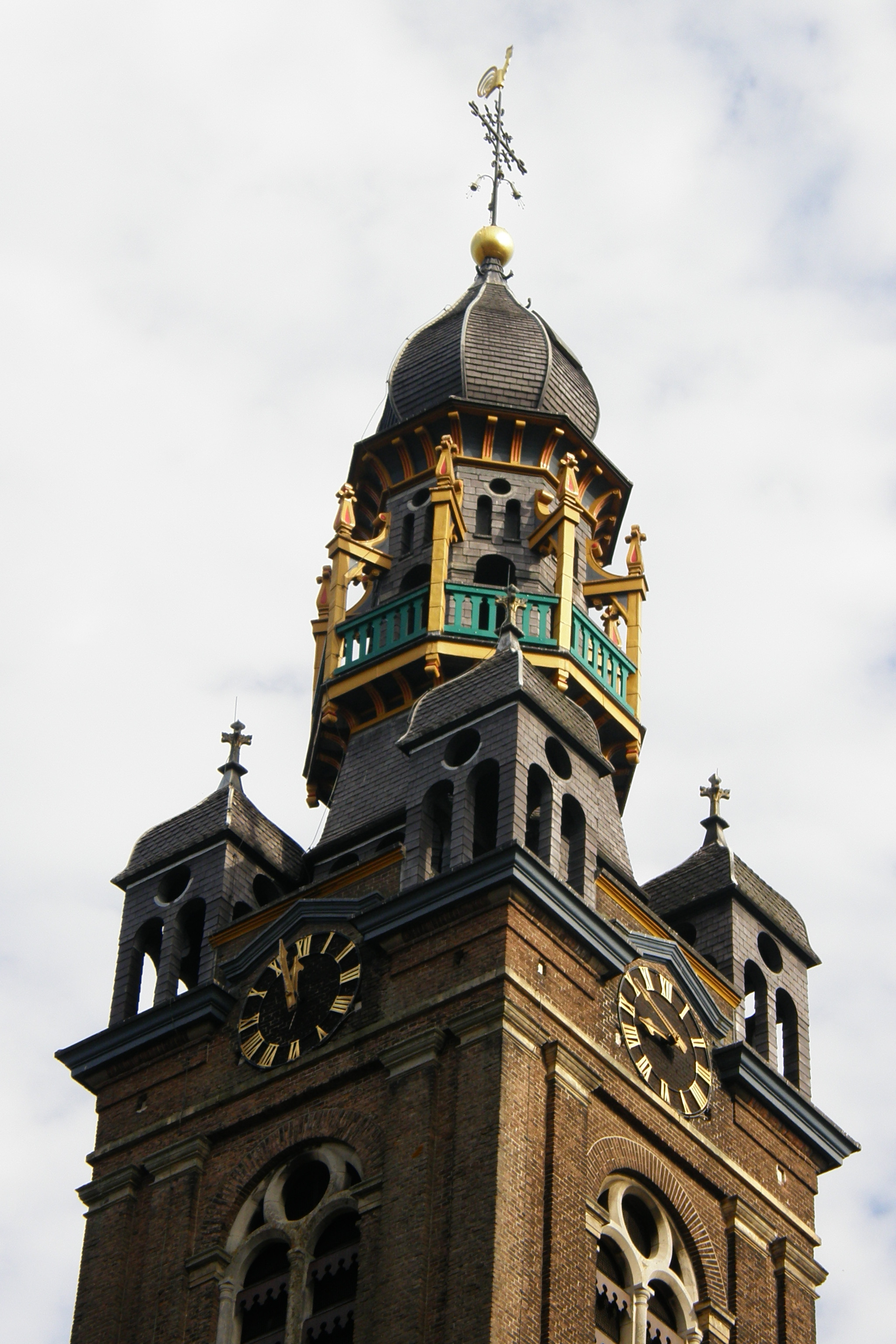
Top of St. Servatius Church, designed by Pierre Cuypers

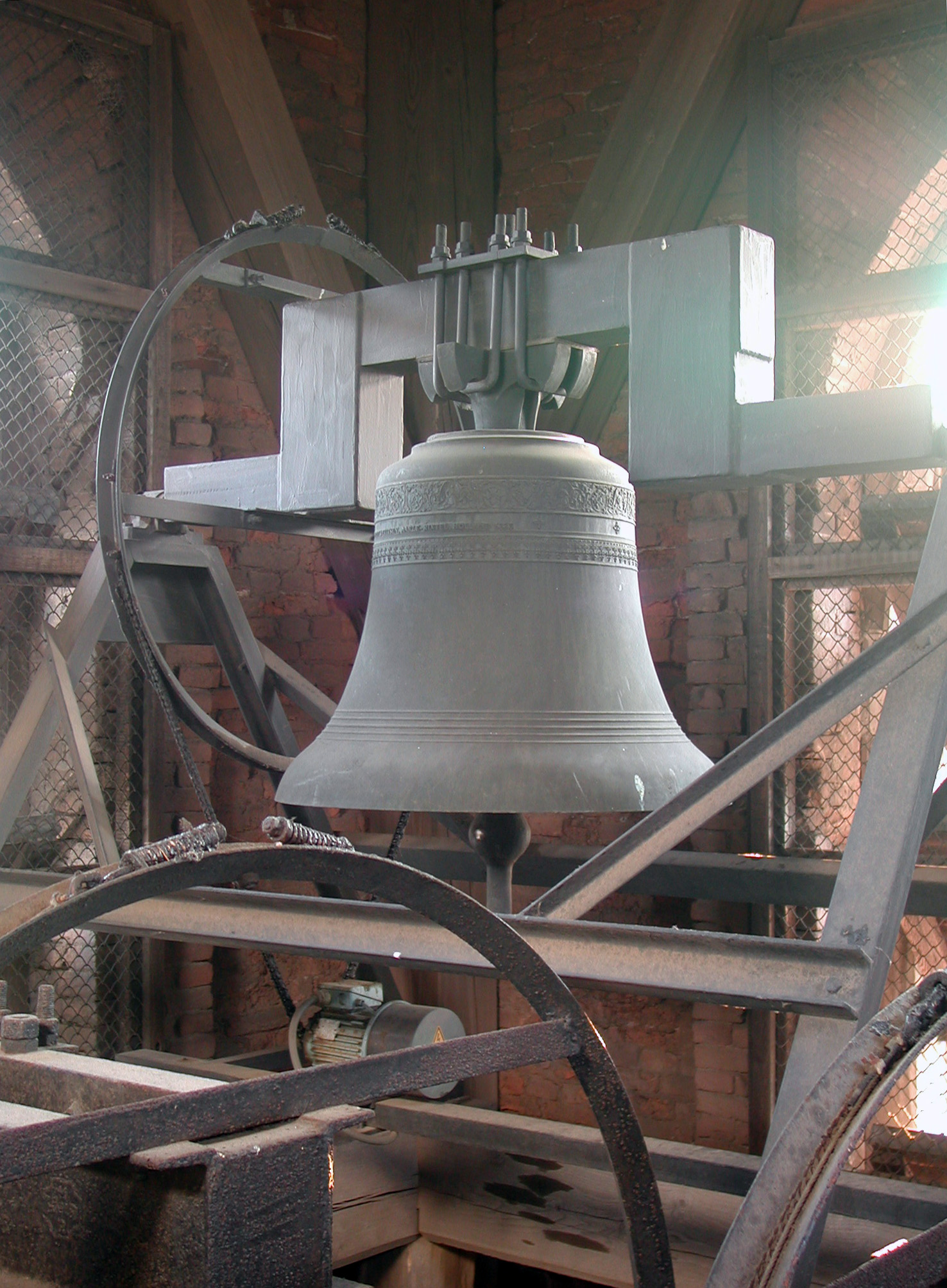
One of the church bells

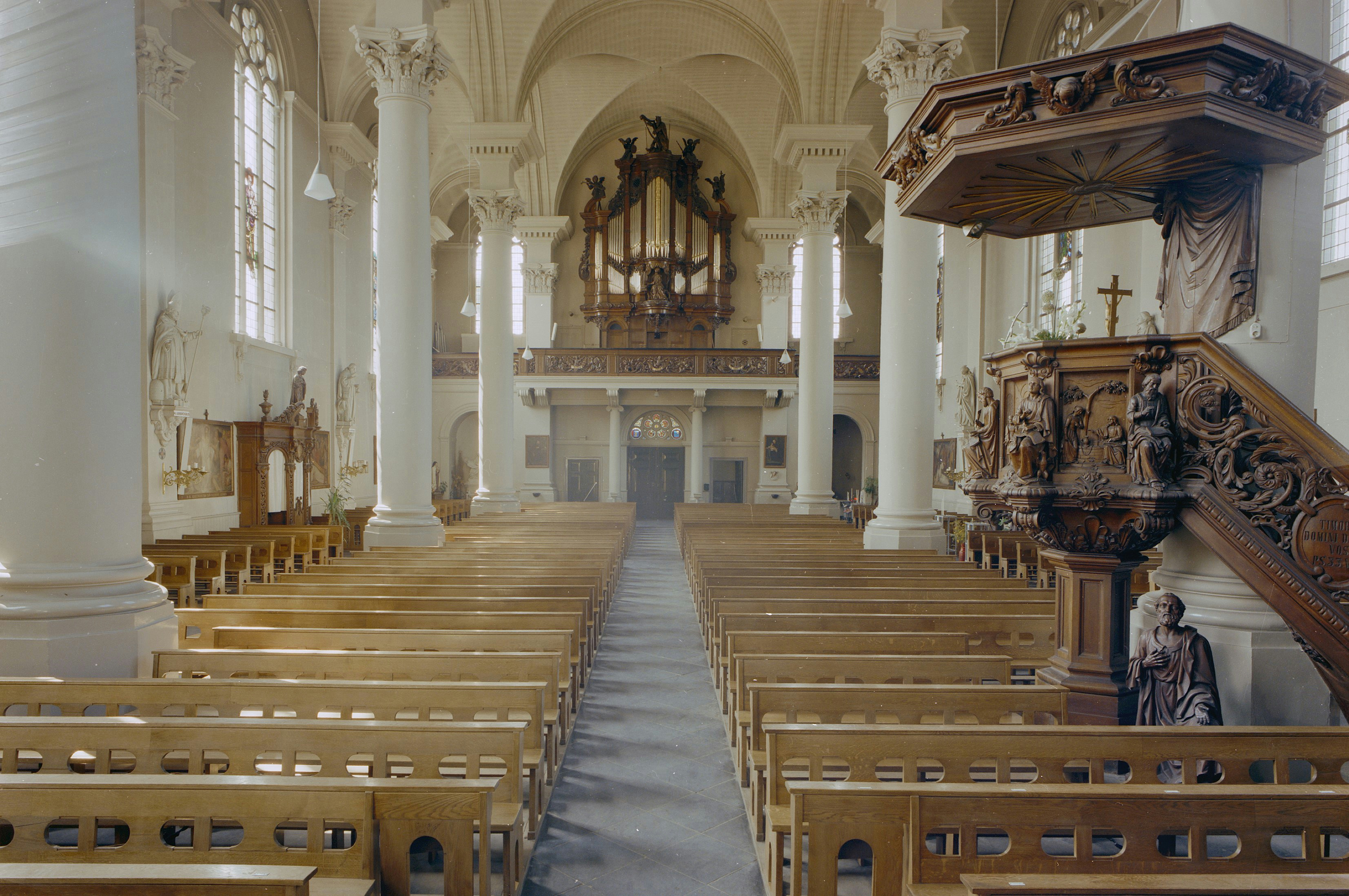
Inside view of church

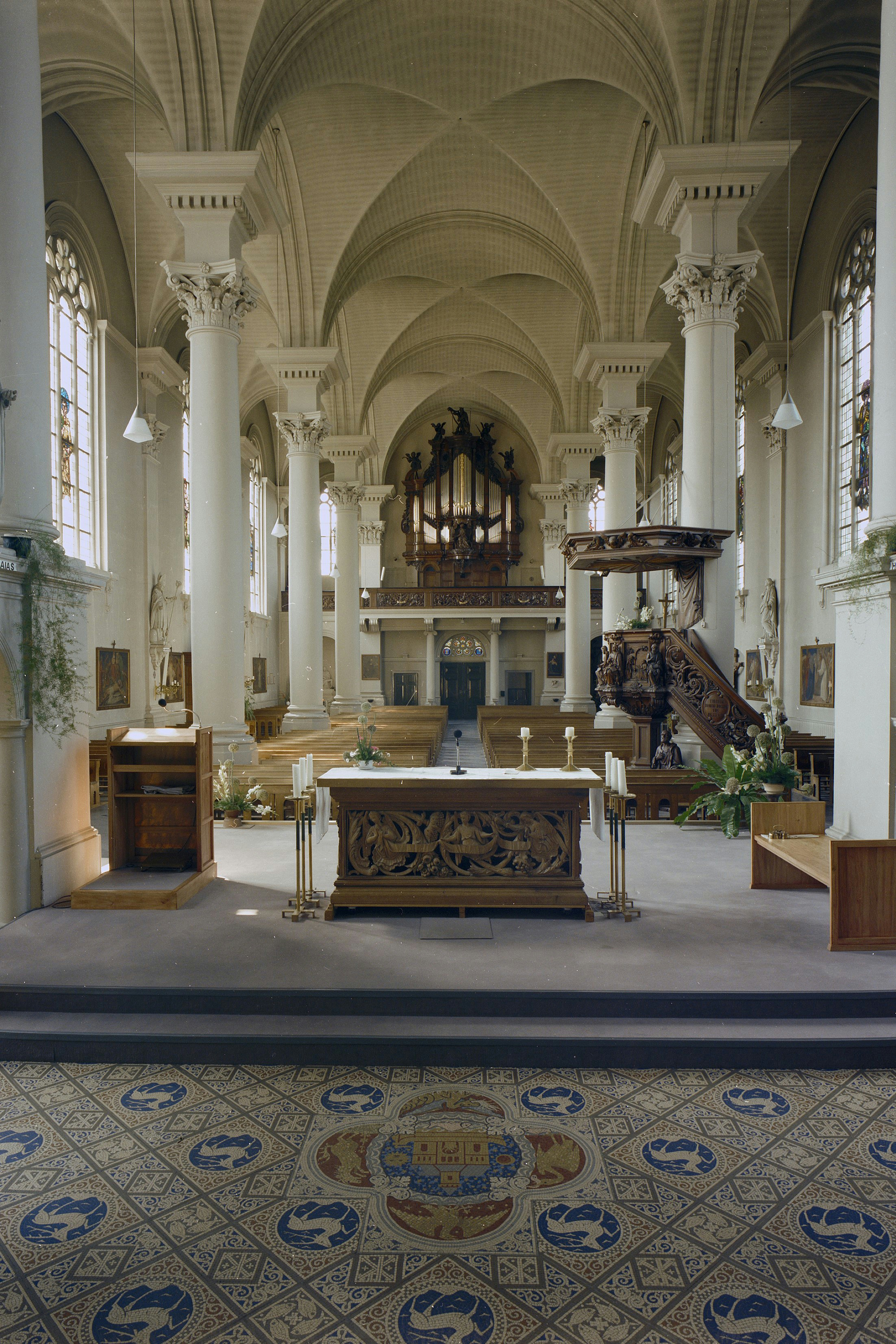
Another inside view of church

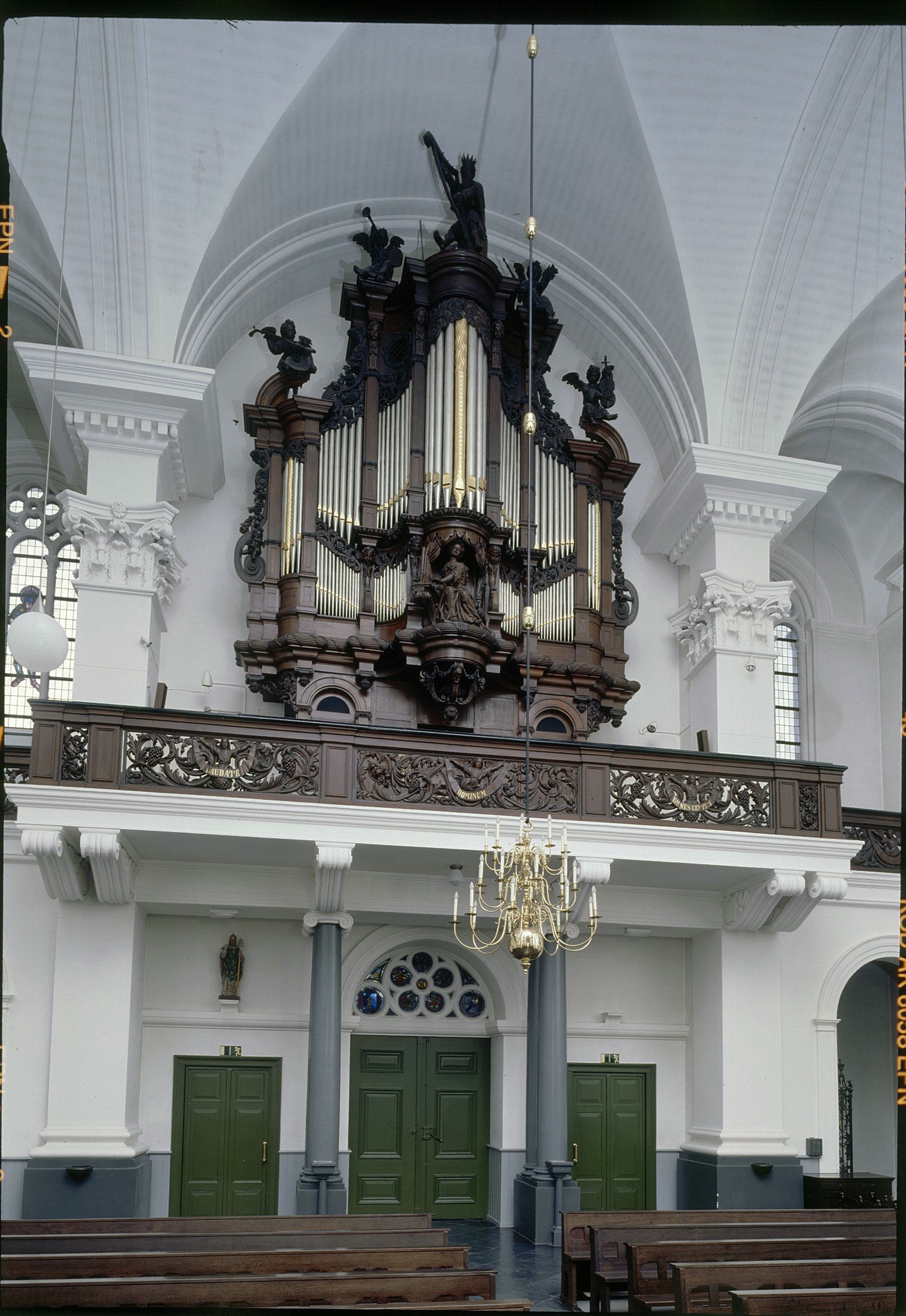
View of the organ

== Historic Sites ==
The following buildings are marked for historic preservation (‘rijksmonument’) by the Dutch government:

- Town Hall. Built in brick in 1791 by Dutch architect Hendrik Verhees (1744–1813). It currently houses Erthepe, the local historical society.
- Saint Servatius Church
- Two 19th-century houses at Hezelstraat 23 and Kerkstraat 31.
- Four farms at Molentiend 2 en 4 (dates from 1898); Morschehoef 16 (18th-century); Morschehoef 19 (19th-century); and Voorbolst 5 (18th-century).

=== The Mills of Erp ===
Erp had several mills throughout the centuries, but all disappeared before the 1960s.

- The oldest windmill, a tower mill at the Watermolenweg, was heavily damaged in a storm in 1949 and subsequently demolished five years later. It was built in 1849 to replace a post mill that was already mentioned in documents in 1540 and served to complement the watermill on the river Aa. The watermill was demolished in 1897.
- The windmill at the Molentiend was built in 1866. This smock mill was demolished in 1954, but the miller's house still remains.
- A stone smock mill, called “De Nijverheid,” was built in 1898 at the Cruijgenstraat. Even though the mill was not damaged or neglected, it was demolished around 1959.

== People ==
Henricus Herp was born in the early 15th century in Erp. He was an influential theological writer and his most famous work is Spieghel der Volcomenheit. He died in the late 15th century in Mechelen, Belgium.

Dutch dressage champion Anky van Grunsven was born January 2, 1968, in Erp and recently moved back. She won two gold medals in the 2000 and 2004 summer Olympics and four silver medals in the 1992, 1996 and 2000 summer Olympics.

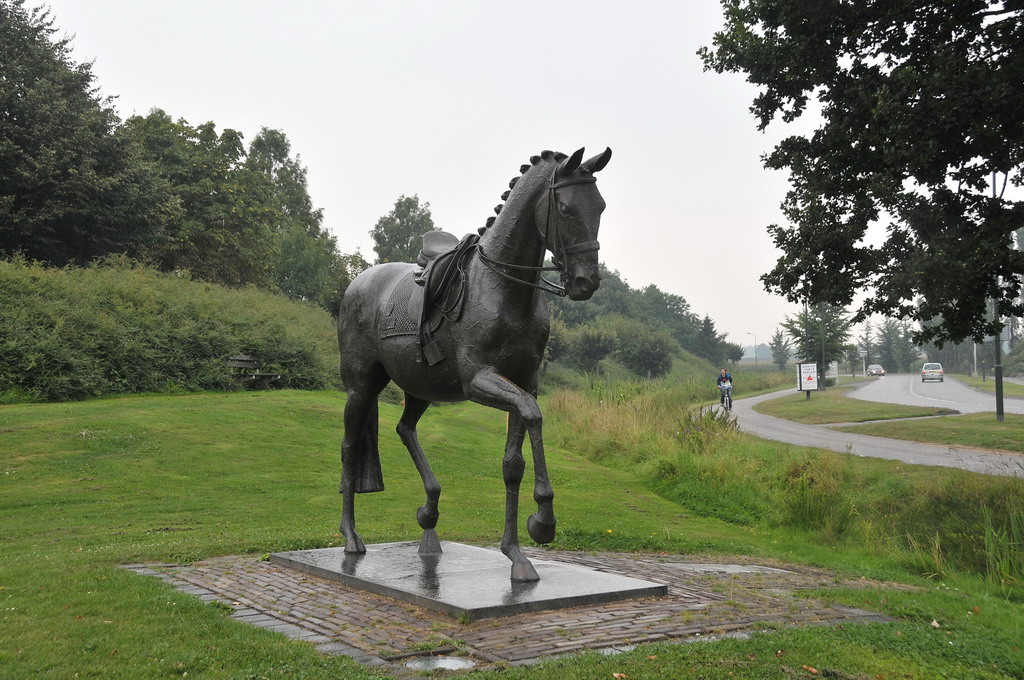
Statue of Bonfire in Erp, Olympic medal winning horse of Anky van Grunsven

== Sources ==
- Meuwese, A.P.M. Dr. Erp; Gemeente en Parochie, ’s Hertogenbosch: Zuid-Nederlandsche Drukkerij N.V., 1955
- Brabants Historisch Informatie Centrum
