= Veghel =

- Town and former municipality
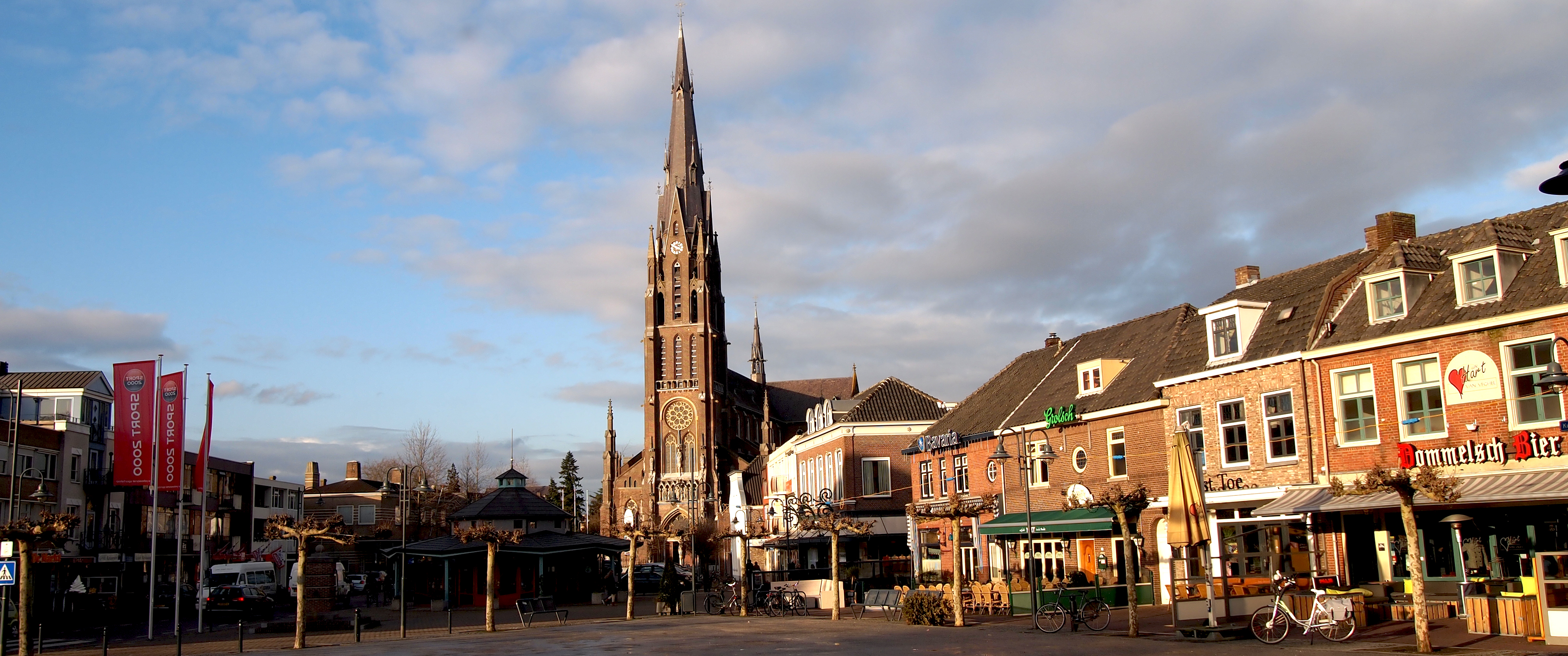
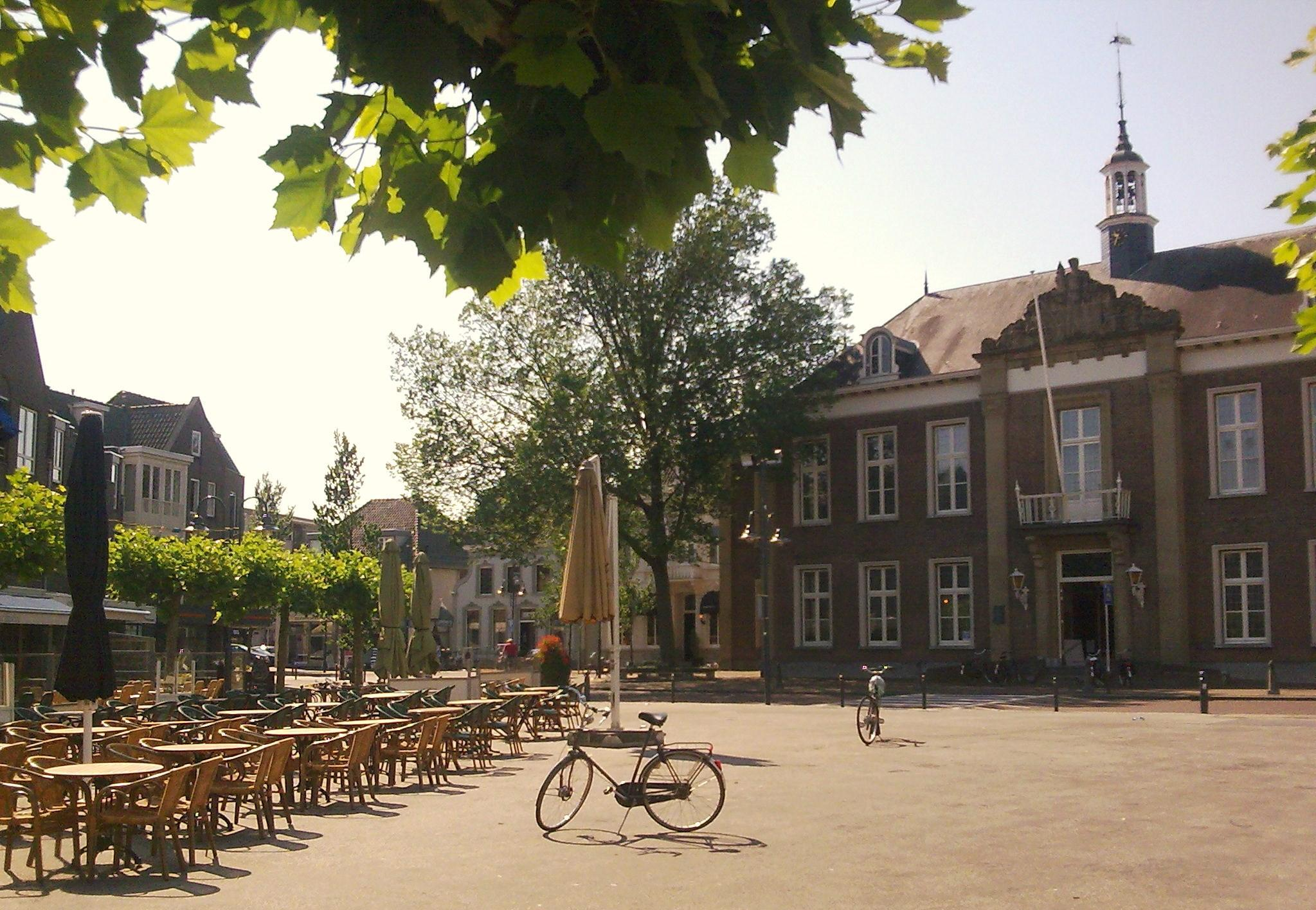
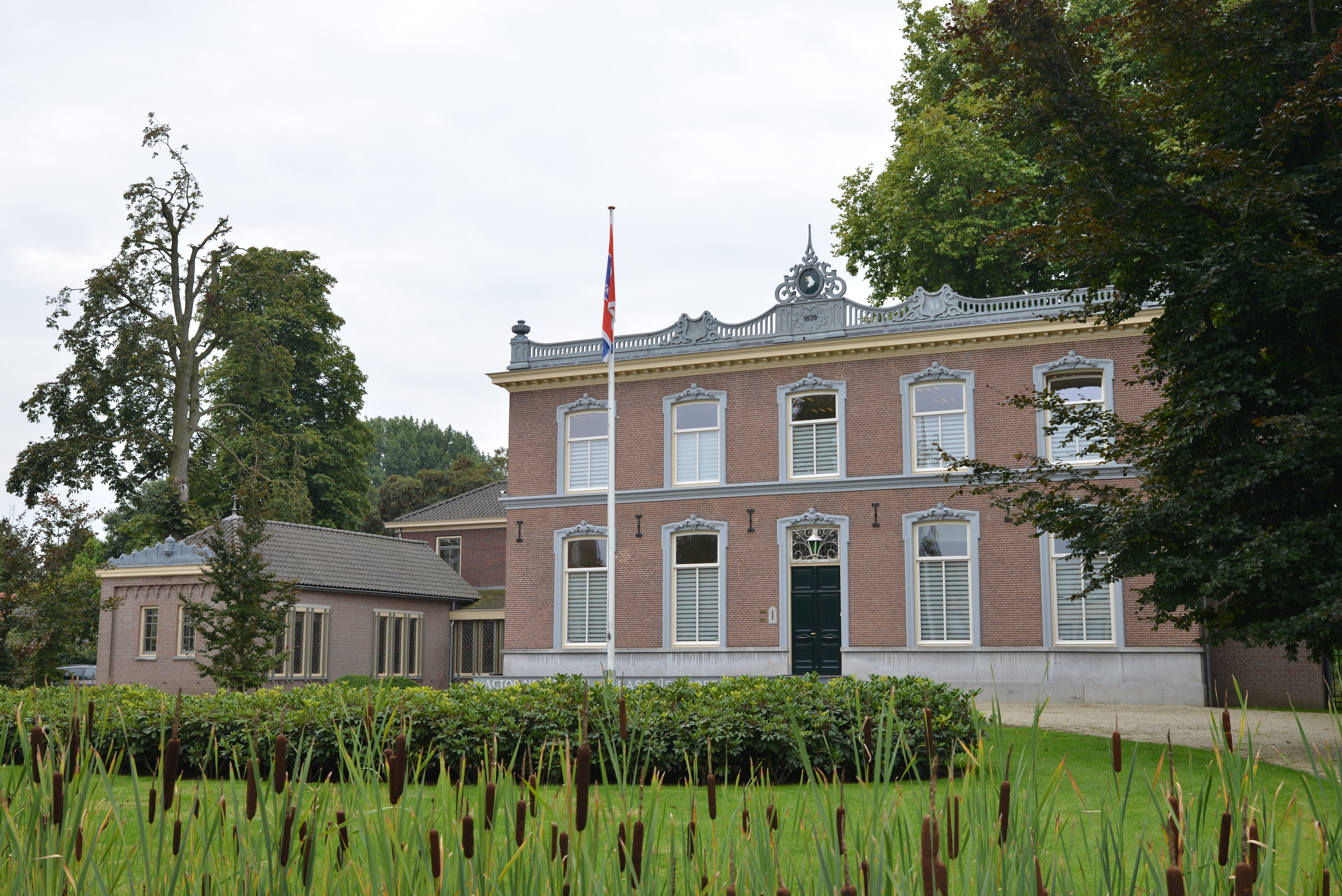
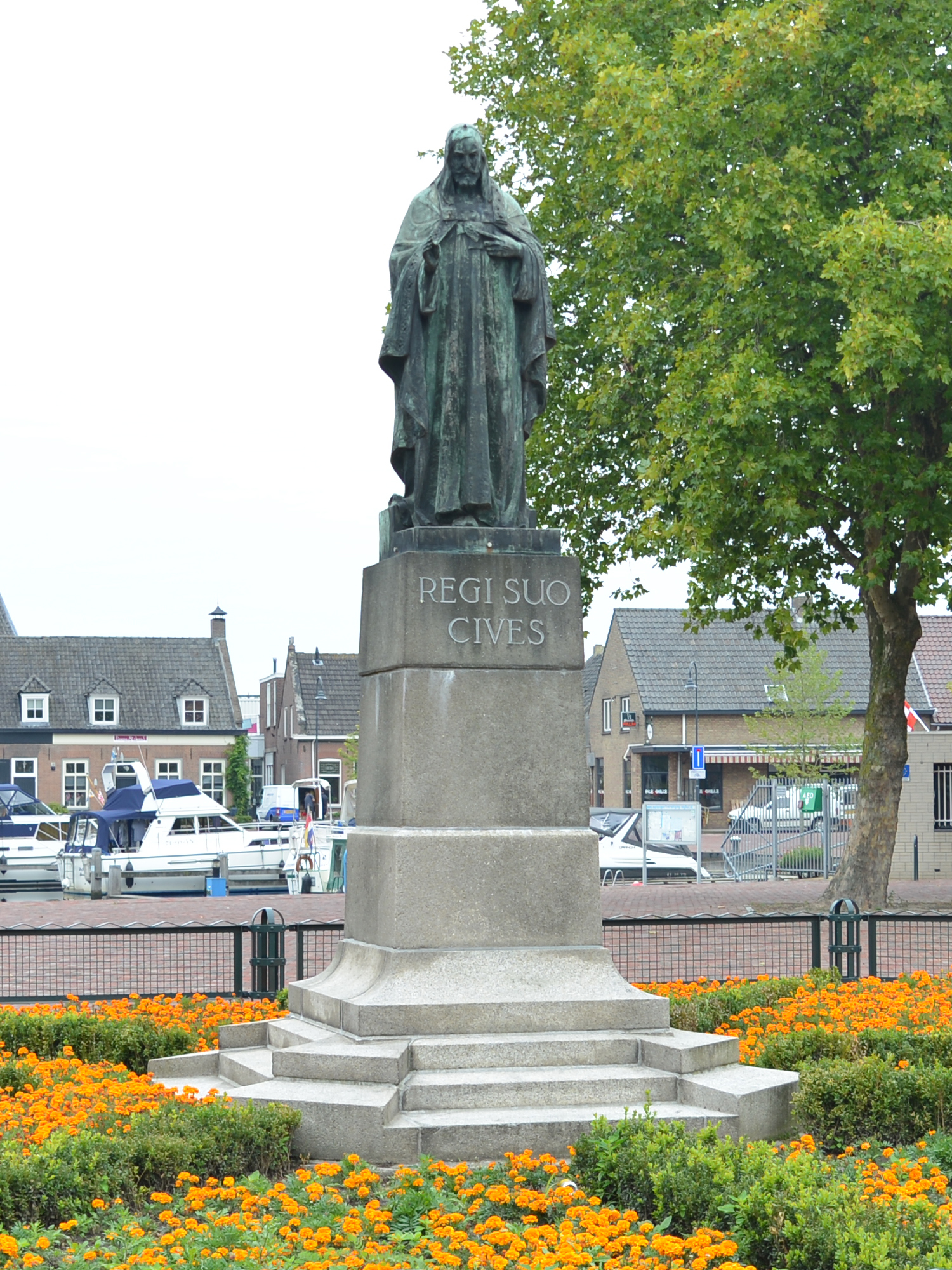
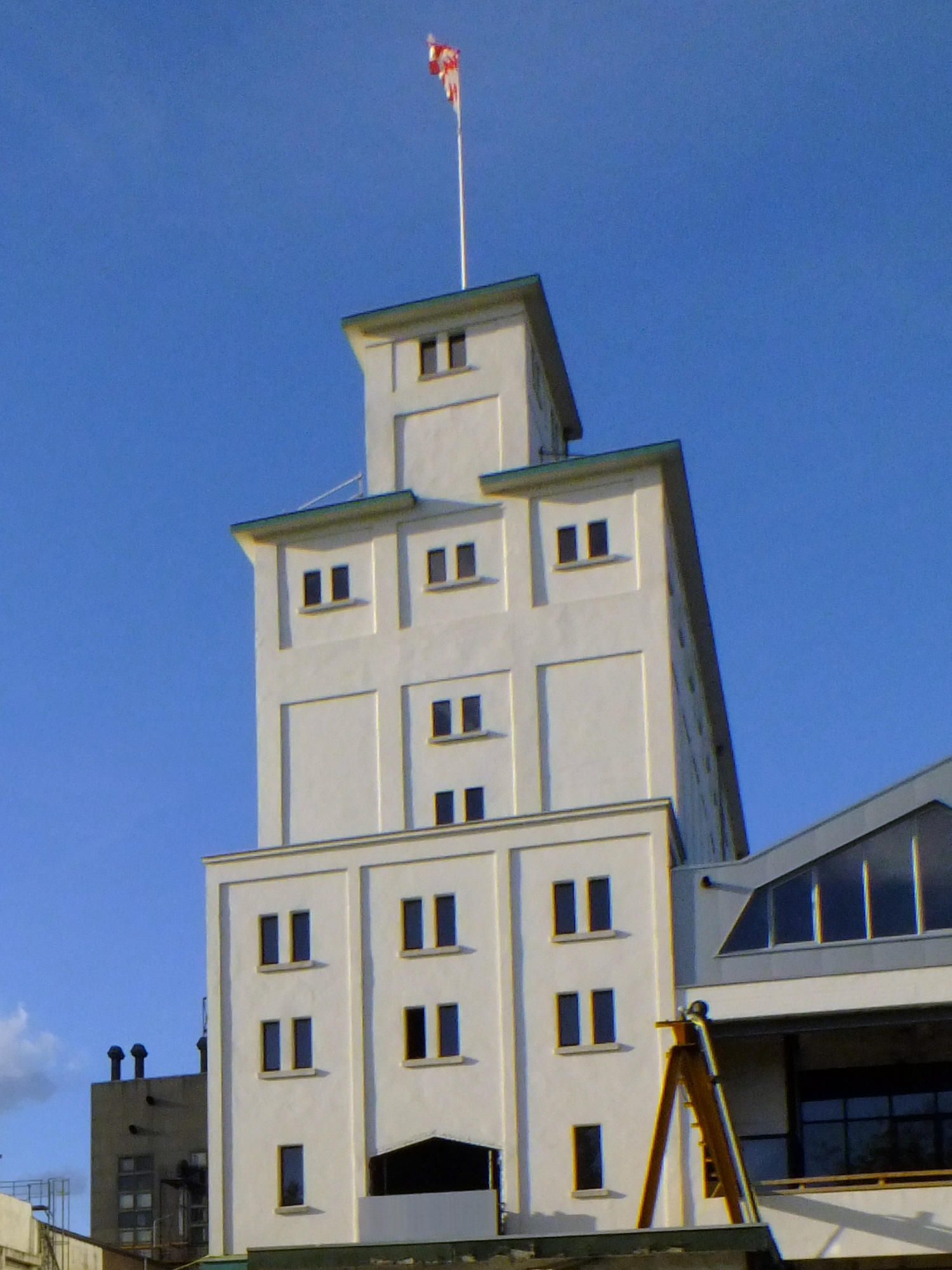
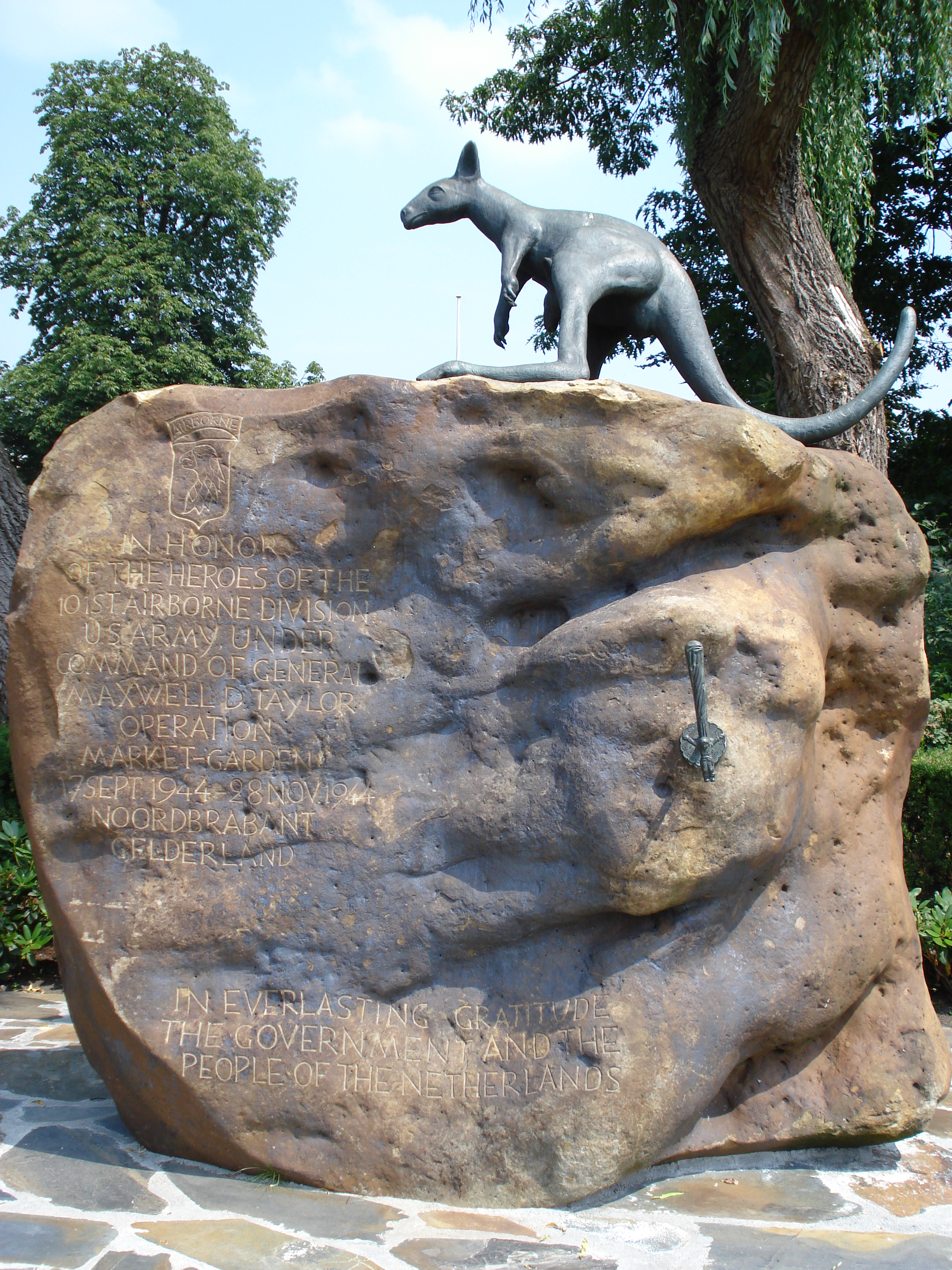
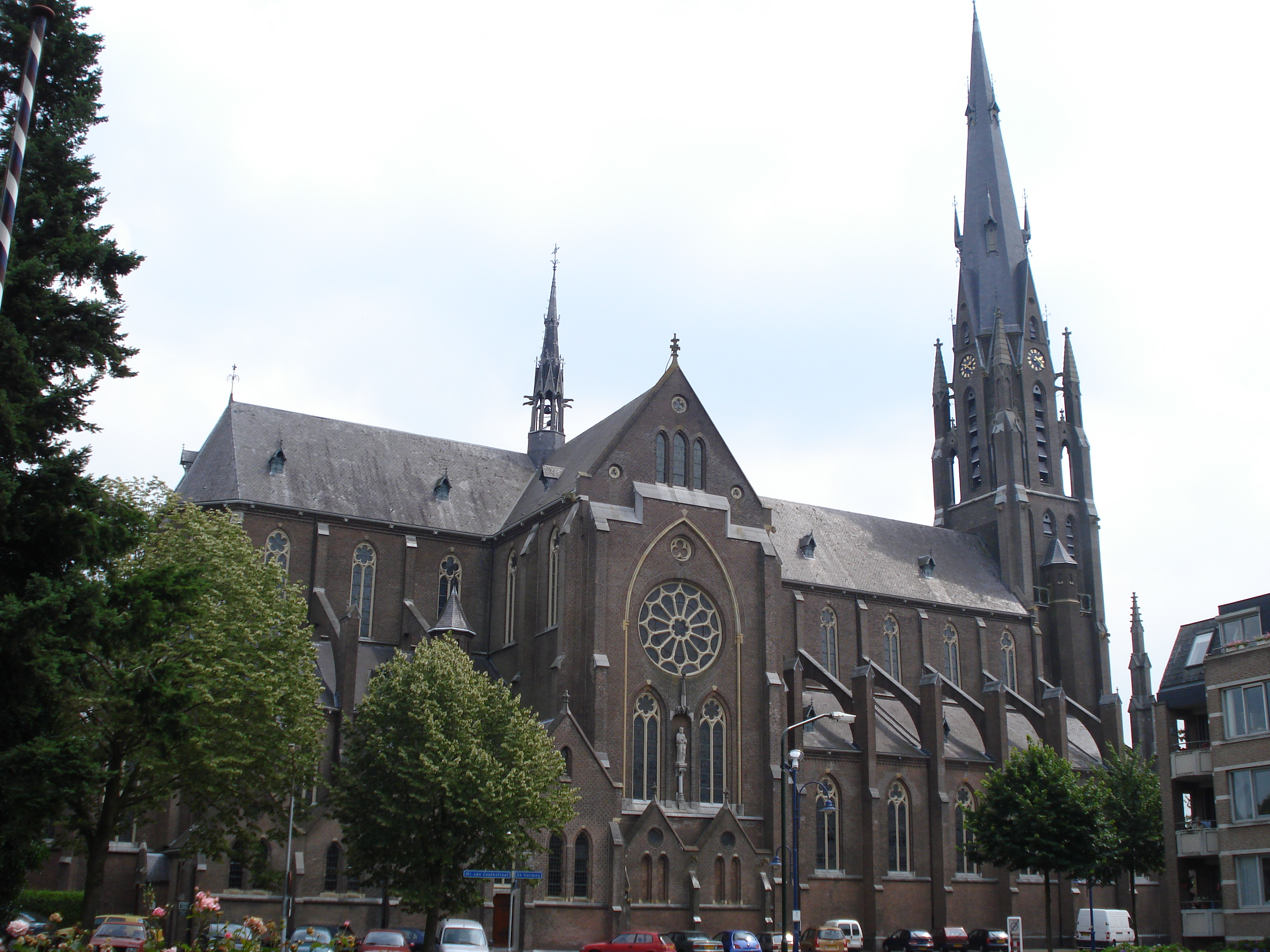
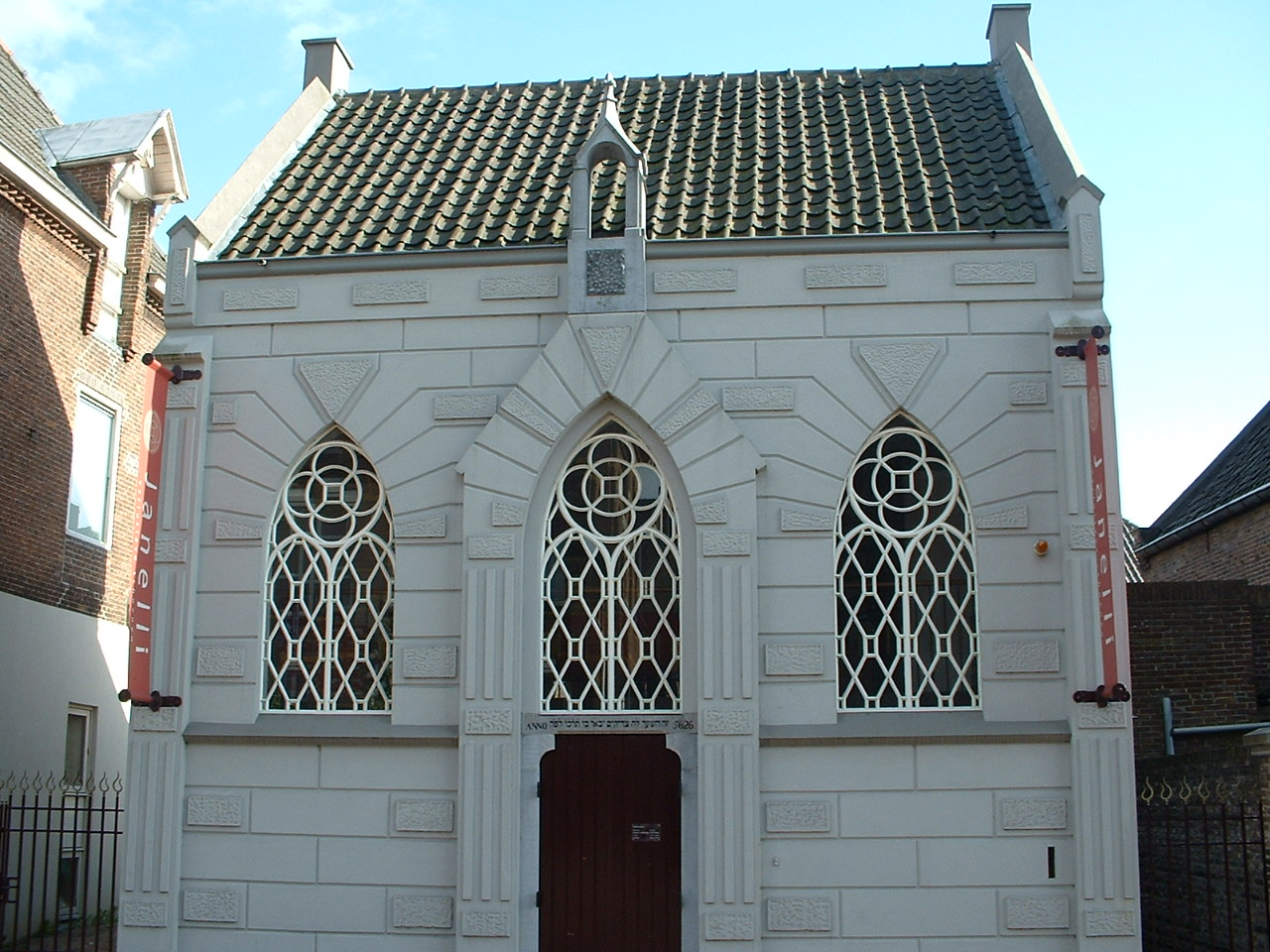
- From top down, left to right: market square of Veghel, former cantonal court and town hall, Klondike villa, Sacred Heart statue, Wiebenga silo, Airborne Monument, Saint Lambert Church, former Synagogue of Veghel

- Flag Coat of arms

- Location in the province of North Brabant in the Netherlands Veghel (Netherlands)
- Coordinates: 51°37′N 5°33′E
- Country: Netherlands
- Province: North Brabant
- Municipality: Meierijstad
- Incorporated: 1310
- Market rights: 1719
- Merged: 2017

Area
  - Town: 43.06 km^{2} (16.63 sq mi)
- Elevation: 10 m (33 ft)

Population (2021)
  - Town: 32,585
  - Density: 756.7/km^{2} (1,960/sq mi)
- Demonym: Veghelaar
- Time zone: UTC+1 (CET)
  - Summer (DST): UTC+2 (CEST)
- Postcode: 5460–5469
- Area code: 0413
- Website: www.veghel.nl

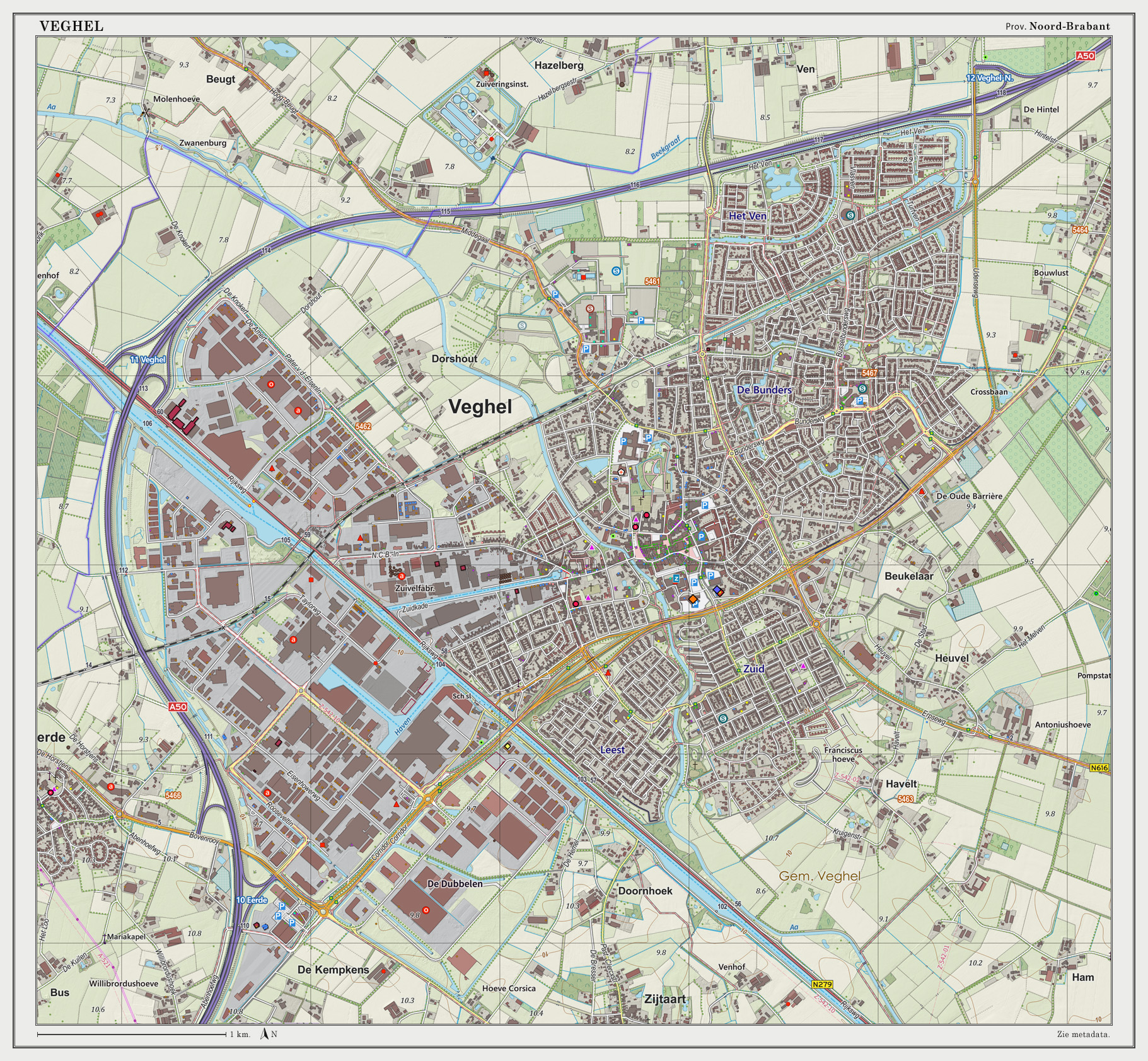
Topographic map of Veghel (town), as of March 2014

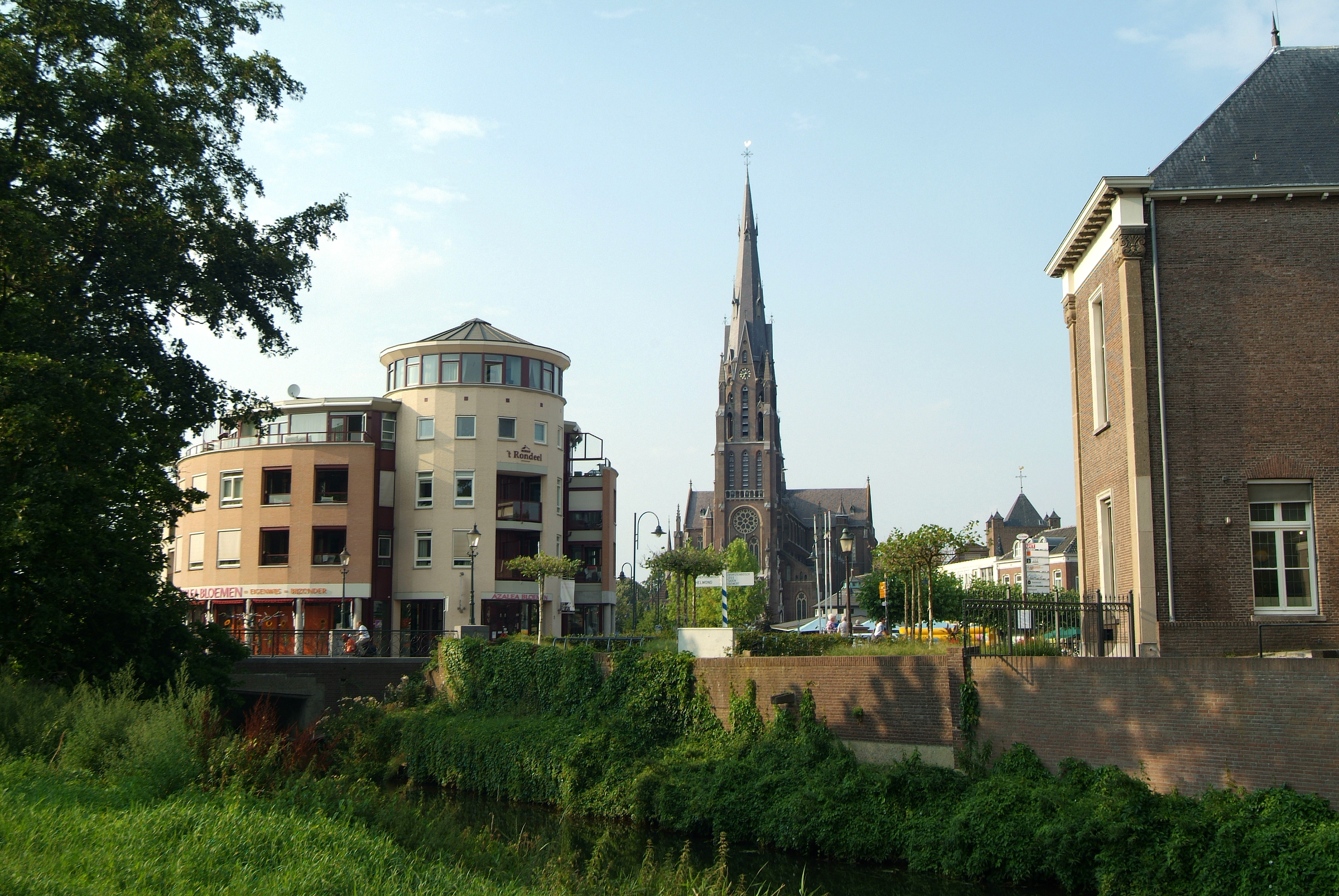
Aa river in front of the Saint Lambert Church in Veghel

Veghel (Dutch pronunciation: [ˈvɛxəl]) is a town and former municipality in the Southern Netherlands. On 1 January 2017 Veghel, together with Schijndel and Sint-Oedenrode, merged into a new municipality called Meierijstad. This created the largest municipality of the province of North Brabant in terms of land area.

== History ==
The first known settlements date to Roman times and were established near the River Aa. The oldest written record of Veghel dates from 1225. It is a document of the Abbey of Berne, written in Latin on a piece of parchment, and describes several properties owned by the abbey. Among those is an estate located in the settlement of "Vehchele".

In 1310, John II of Brabant granted the inhabitants the right to use common grounds. For some decades in the 16th and 17th century, the municipality was ruled by the Lords Van Erp; they resided at their castle of Frisselsteijn in Veghel.

In 1648 Veghel became part of the Republic of the Seven United Netherlands. As a former part of the Duchy of Brabant, Veghel is situated in the Meierij of 's-Hertogenbosch.

Like all the other areas of Brabant and Limburg which were transferred to the Netherlands by the Peace of Westphalia), Veghel was a Catholic town. It suffered economic and religious oppression from the Protestant Dutch and was part of the military buffer zone of the Dutch Republic.

In 1719 Veghel became a market town, when it was granted market rights by the States General of the Netherlands. This gave it the privilege of holding weekly markets and four annual fairs. However, it was not until the French wars of 1795 that Veghel formally received freedom of religion again and received a guarantee of full common rights from the Dutch government.

In 1810 Veghel became part of the Kingdom of the Netherlands. From the middle of the 19th century, the agrarian market town began to industrialize as a consequence of the opening of the South Willem's Canal. The wealth generated by new industries helped support the construction of large-scale buildings, such as the neogothic church by Pierre Cuypers and the neoclassical town hall, dates from that period. Monastic orders developed Veghel as a regional centre of health care and education, which it remains to this day.

In 1940 Veghel was occupied by German troops. With the beginning of Operation Market Garden in 1944, Veghel was one of the dropping-sites for Allied paratroops owing to its strategic location.

The period since the 1950s has seen much growth, with the development of new industries. Also several international companies (e.g. Mars, Incorporated, FrieslandCampina, DMV International, Agrifirm, Kuehne + Nagel, DHL Supply Chain, Alliance Healthcare, ThyssenKrupp and Vanderlande Industries) have established centers in Veghel.

Its shopping centre and marketplace earned the town the name of "Pearl of the Meierij". Veghel is an educational centre for the surrounding district: it has several secondary schools, a senior secondary vocational school, and the Pedagogic Academy, founded in 1872 and one of the oldest higher vocational schools in the area.

Since 1994, Veghel and the neighbouring town of Erp have formed a single municipality.

== Demographics ==
=== Towns ===
Population figures as of 1 January 2015, ranked by size:

Town	Population	Density
Veghel (nl)	31,032	730/km^{2}
Erp	6,743	189/km^{2}

==== Population centres ====
Population figures as of 1 January 2015, ranked by size:

Urban core	Population	Density
Veghel	26,491	1063/km^{2}
Erp	4,761	239/km^{2}
Zijtaart	1,727	173/km^{2}
Mariaheide	1,449	355/km^{2}
Eerde	1,365	387/km^{2}
Keldonk	1,204	112/km^{2}
Boerdonk	778	157/km^{2}

=== Language ===
The language spoken by the native population is North Meierijs (an East Brabantian dialect, which is very similar to colloquial Dutch).

=== Nationalities ===
Compared to other towns in the region, the ethnic makeup of Veghel is relatively diverse. More than 22% of the town's population, or 17% of the municipality's population, is of foreign origin. In total, Veghel is home to people of more than a hundred different nationalities. About 90% of the municipality's total foreign population lives inside the town proper of Veghel.

== Local festivals ==
Every November sees the celebration of the entry of St Nicholas (Sinterklaas). Every two years in June or July, the Slokdarmfestival takes place. On 1 September the harbour festival takes place. In February or March the traditional carnival is held.

== Attractions ==
- The neogothic church of St Lambert and its graveyard containing war graves
- The neorenaissance former town hall
- The neogothic former synagogue (recently rebuilt)
- The Protestant church
- The monastery of the Franciscan Sisters of the Immaculate Conception from the Holy Mother of God with its gardens and church

== Notable residents ==
- Anky van Grunsven, dressage champion.
- Dillianne van den Boogaard, former Netherlands international field hockey player.
- Earnie Stewart, former United States international soccer player.
- Theo Lucius, former professional footballer for PSV Eindhoven and Feyenoord.
- Theo Maassen, comedian and actor.
- Glenn van Berlo, racing driver.
- Frits van Eerd, former general manager of Jumbo and racing driver and founder of Racing Team Nederland.
- Rob Jetten, prime minister of the Netherlands since 2026.

== Twin towns – sister cities ==
Veghel is twinned with:

- Goch in Germany
- Pont-Audemer in France

== Gallery ==
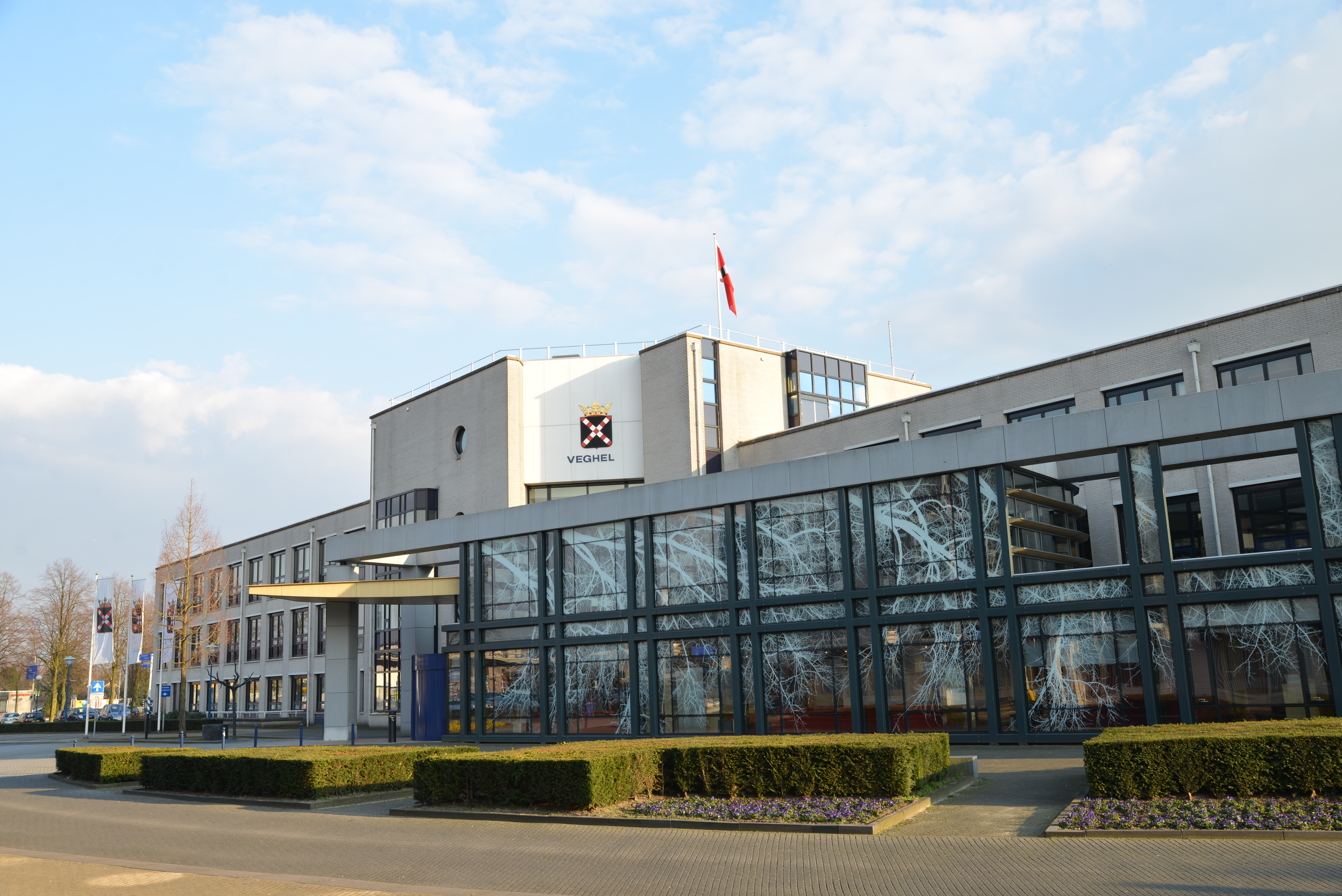
Town Hall of Veghel

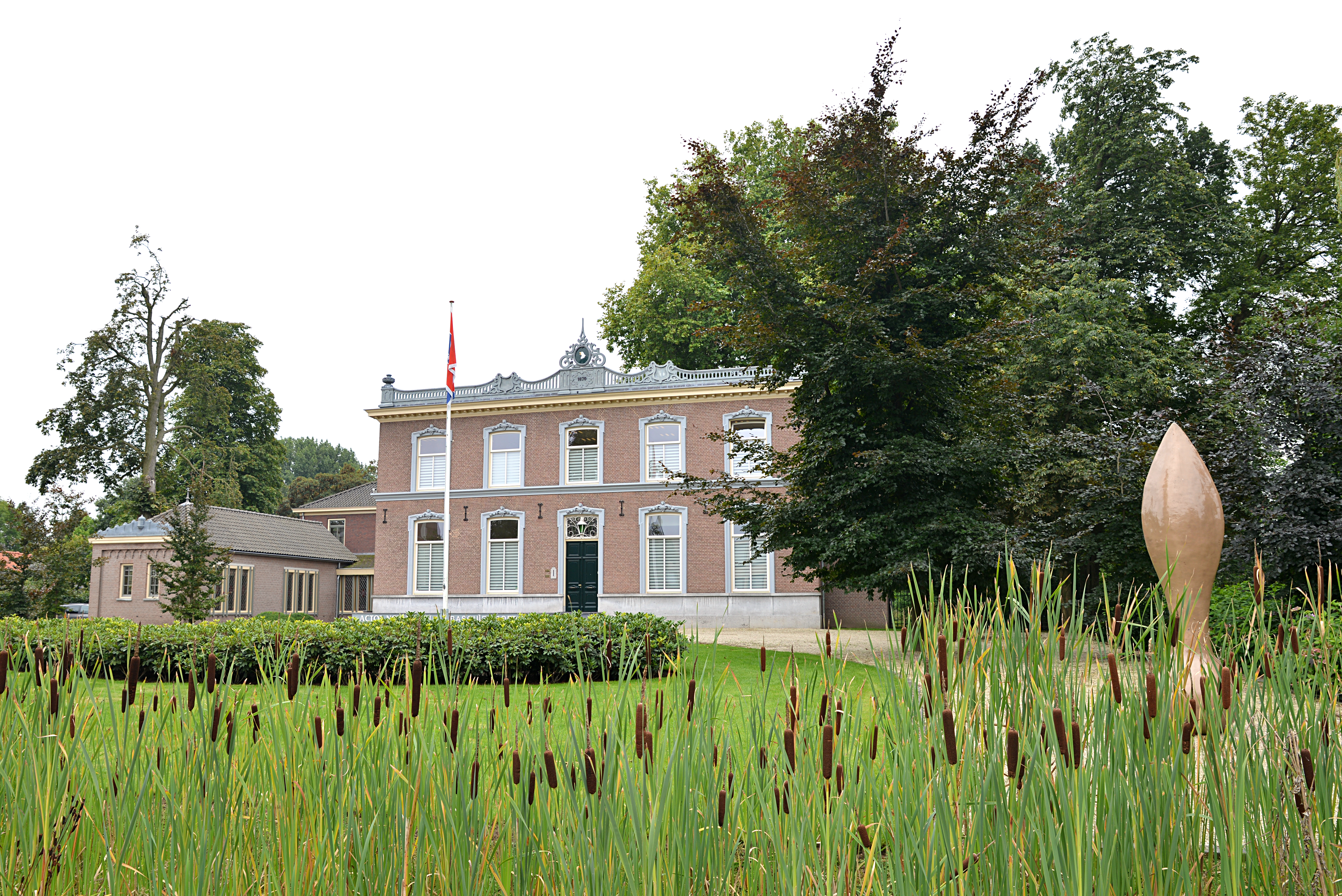
Villa Klondike, former headquarters of the 501st Parachute Infantry Regiment (101st Airborne Division)

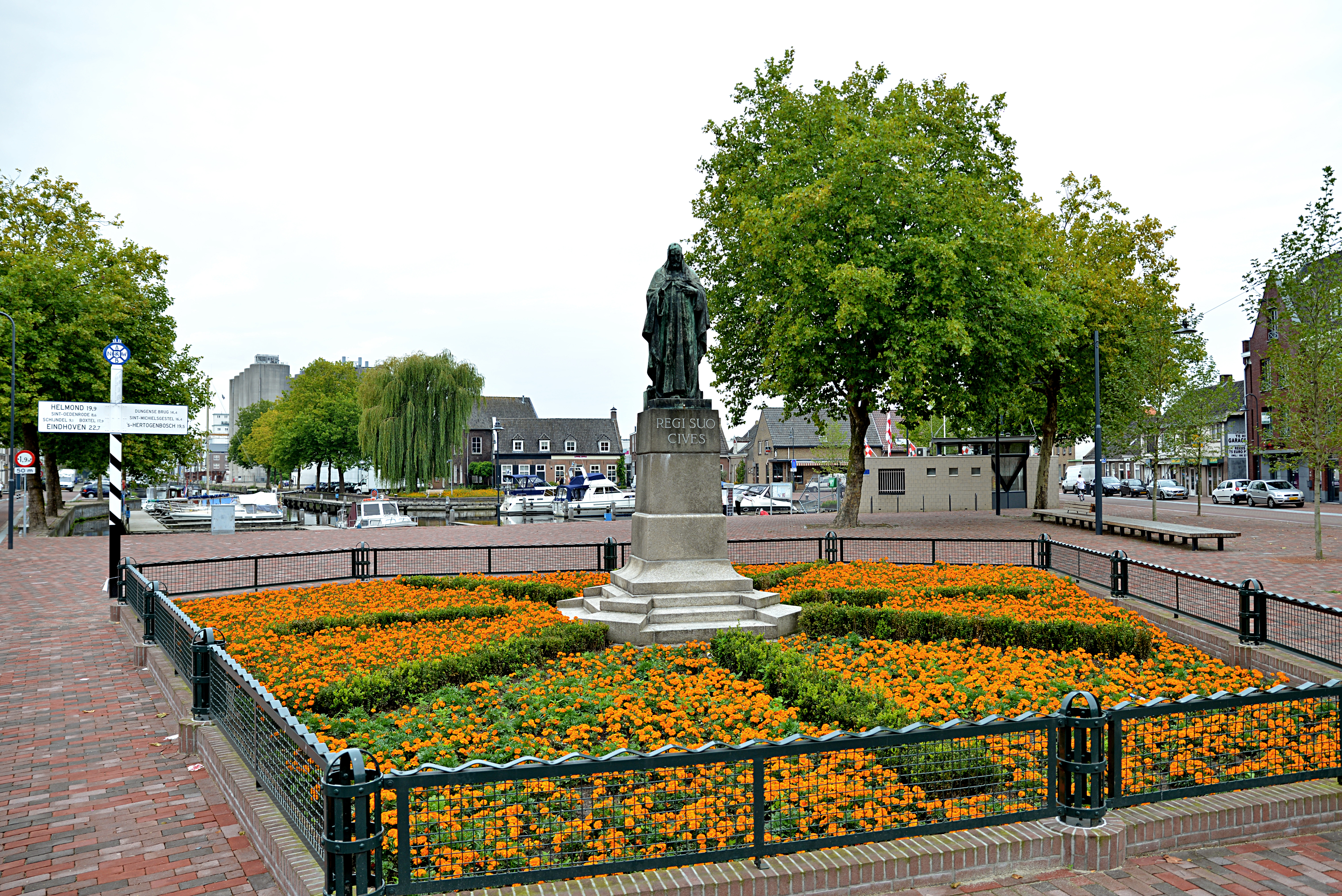
Statue of the Sacred Heart of Jesus at the marina square

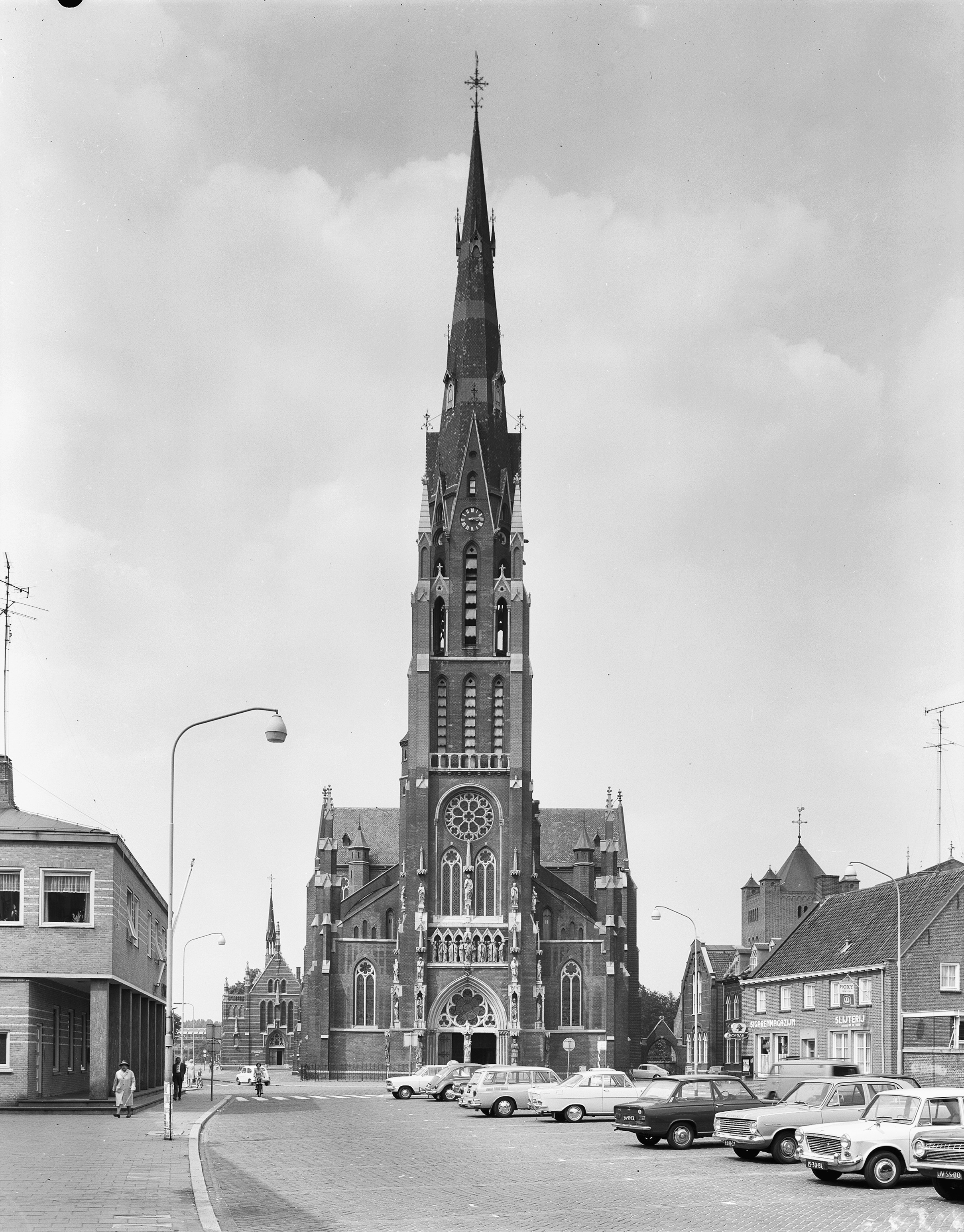
Saint Lambert Church

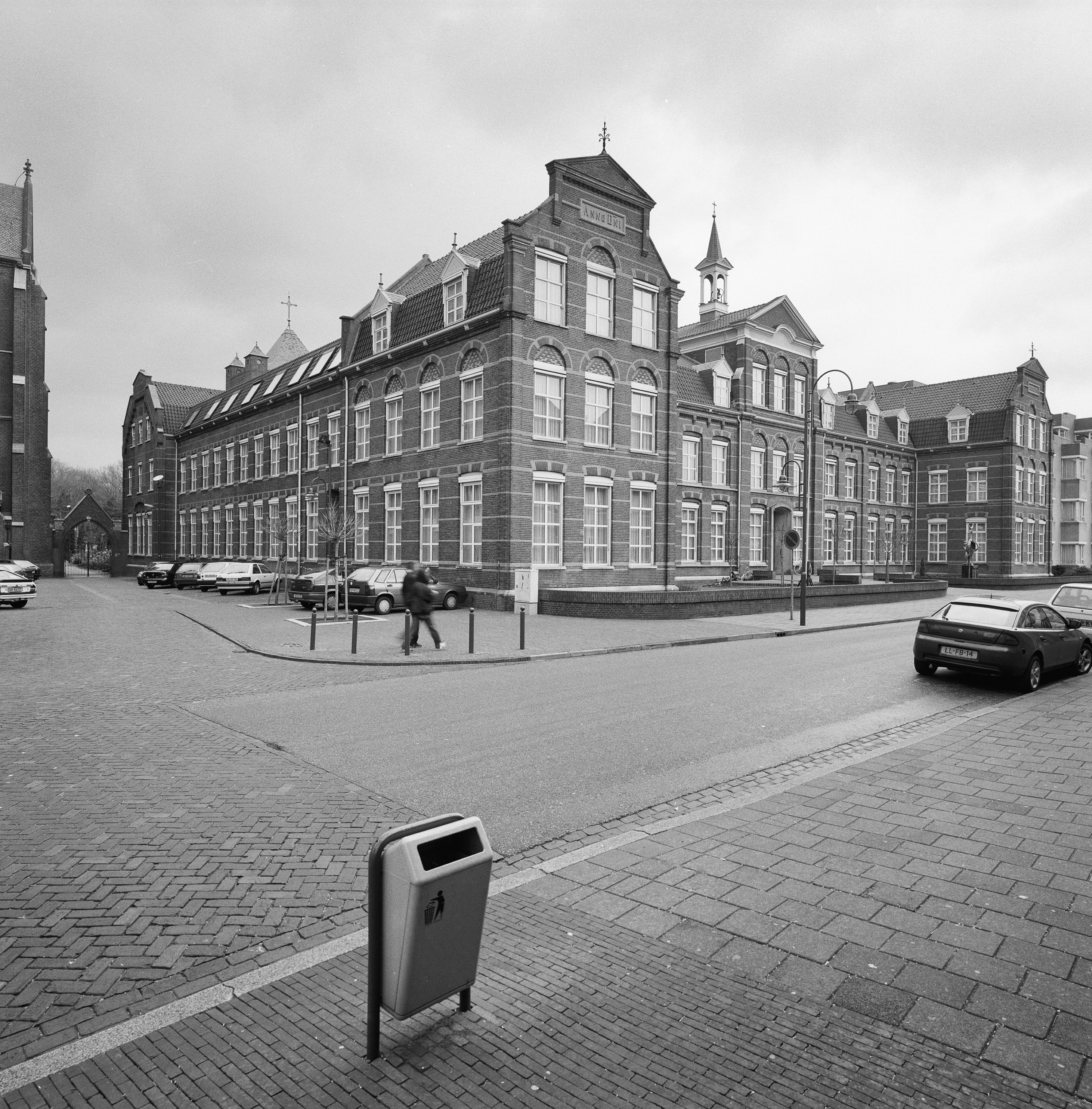
Franciscan Sisters of the Immaculate Conception of the Holy Mother of God nunnery

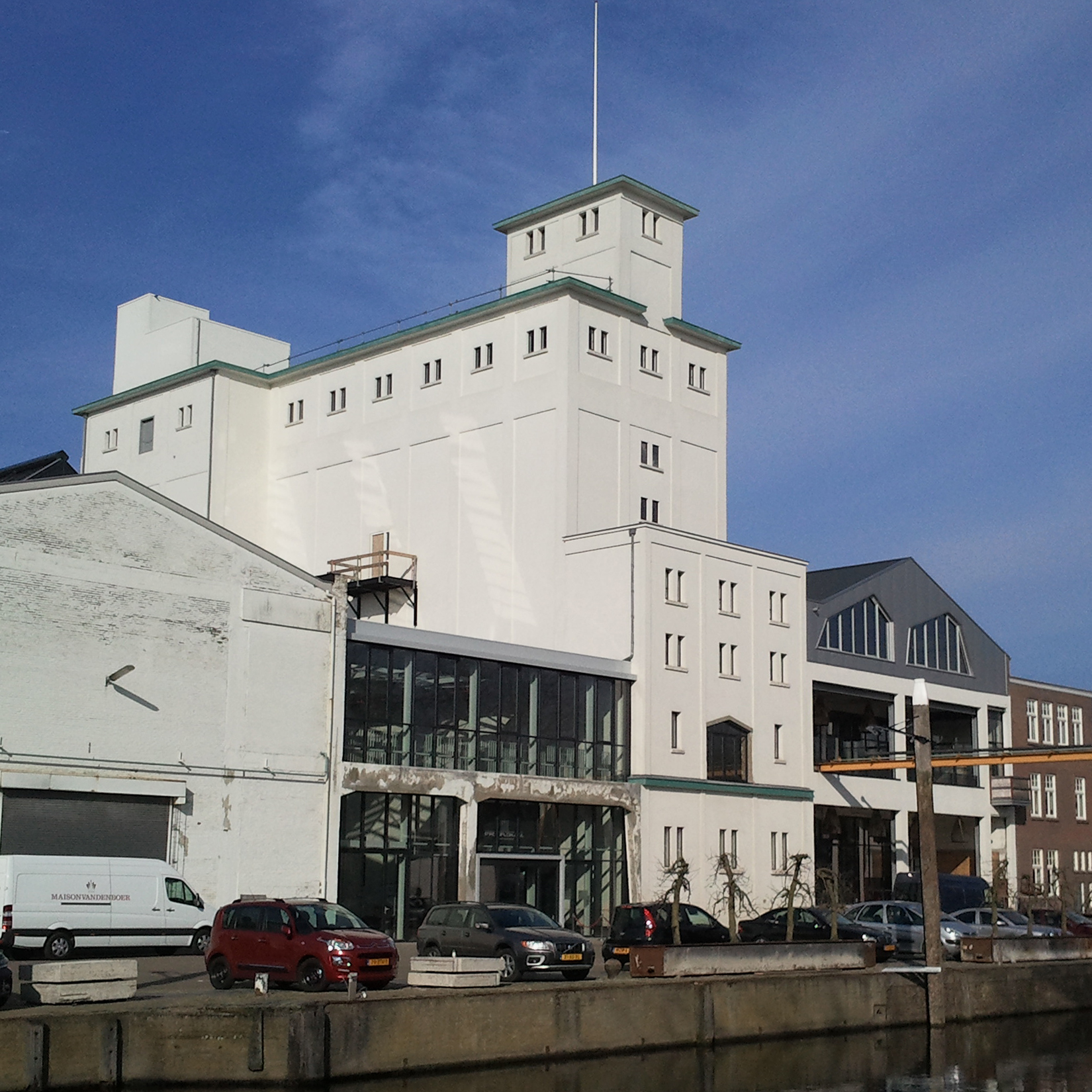
Modernist silo by J.G. Wiebenga, part of the New Objectivity movement

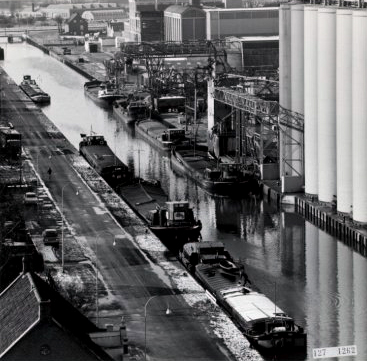
Inland port of Veghel

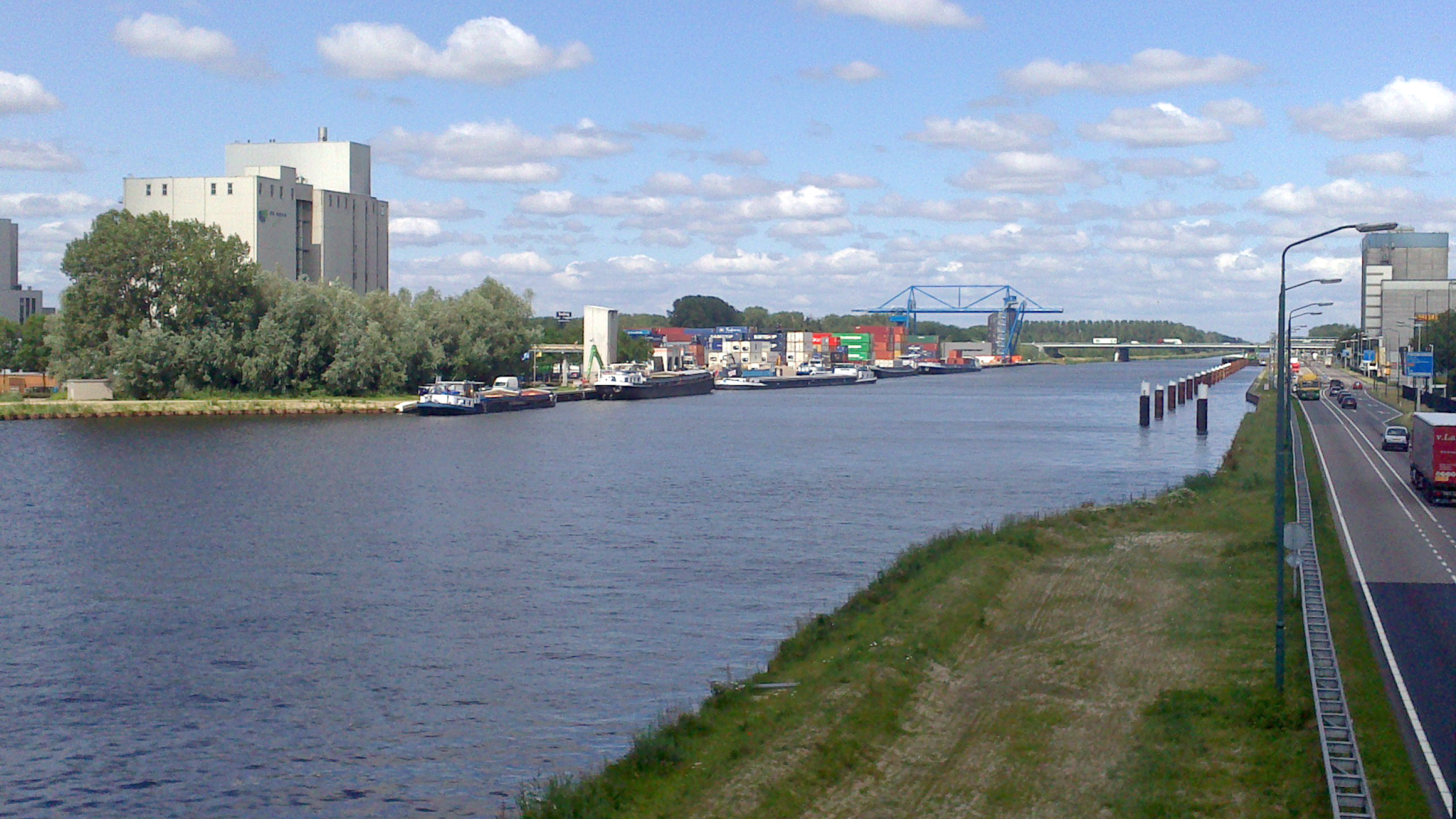
Inland port of Veghel

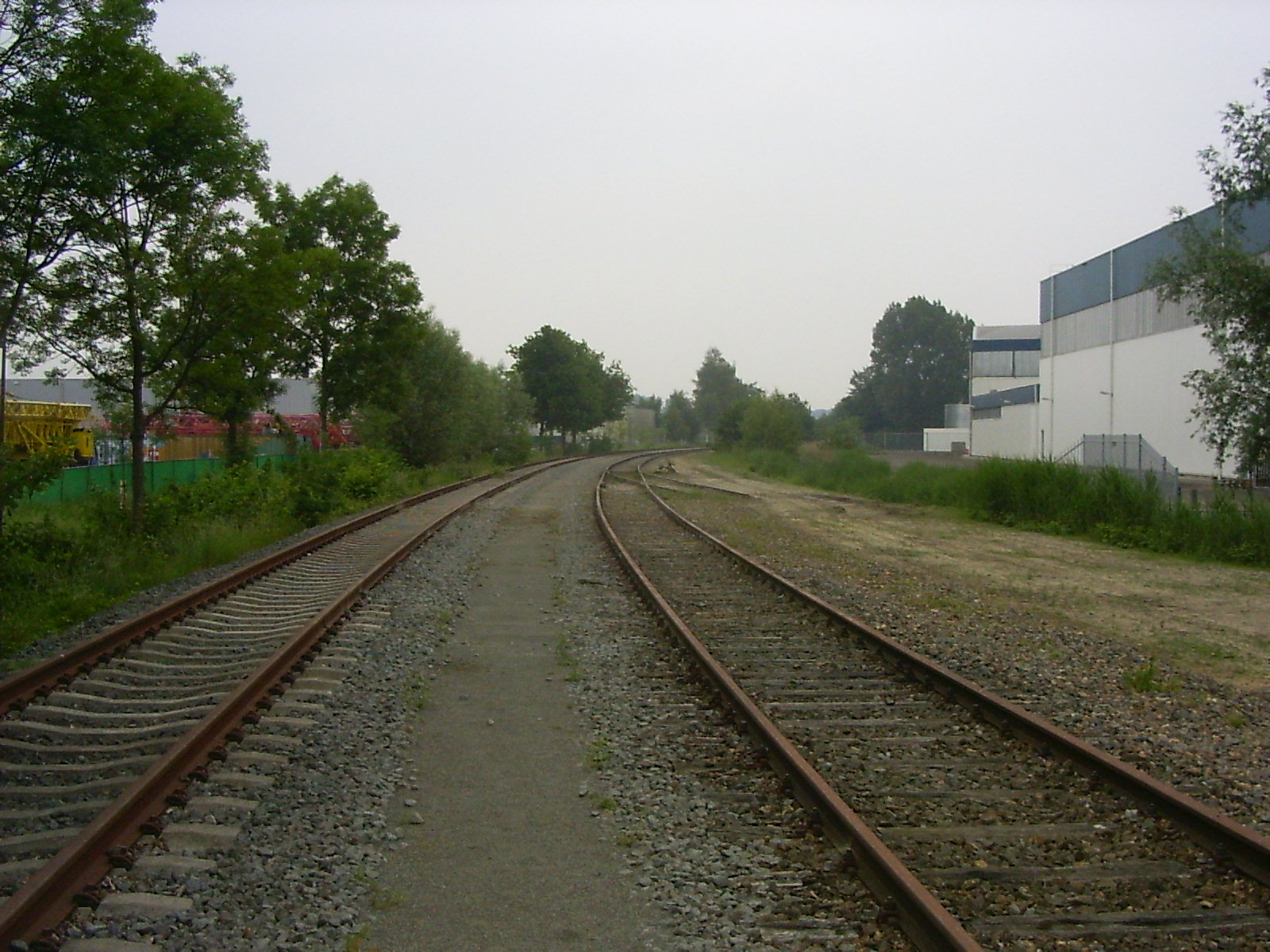
Boxtel-Wesel Railway

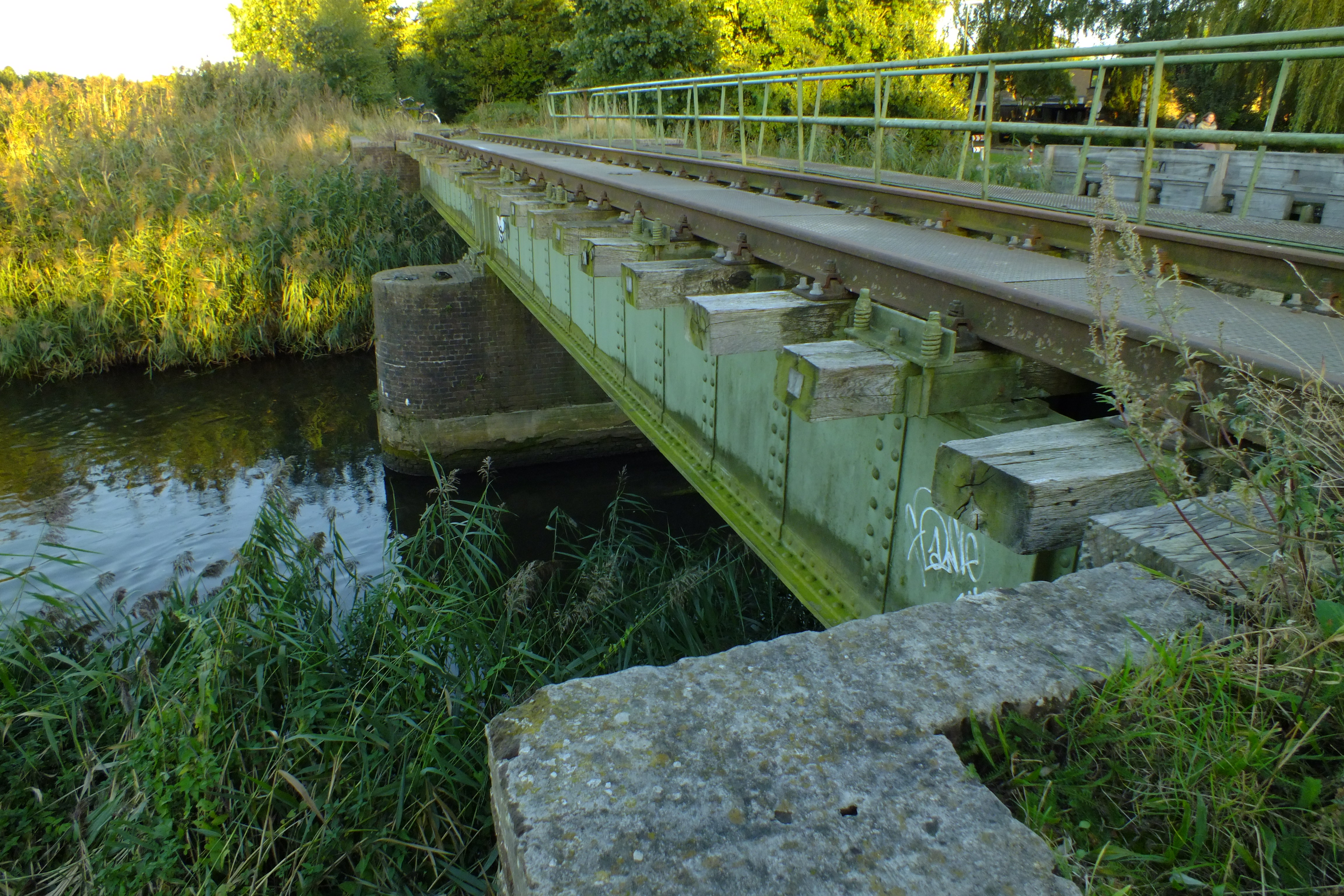
Railroad crossing the Aa river

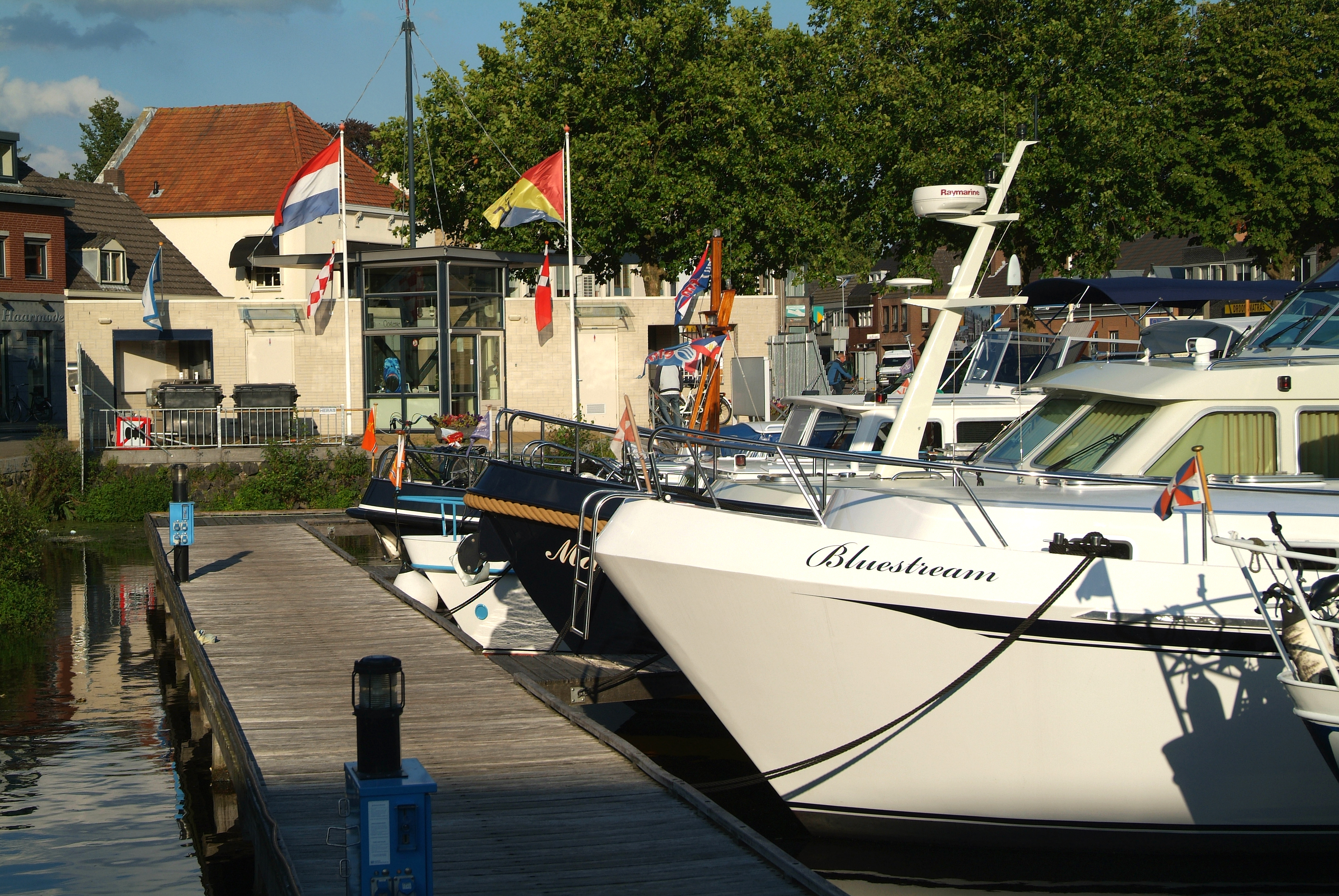
Marina of Veghel

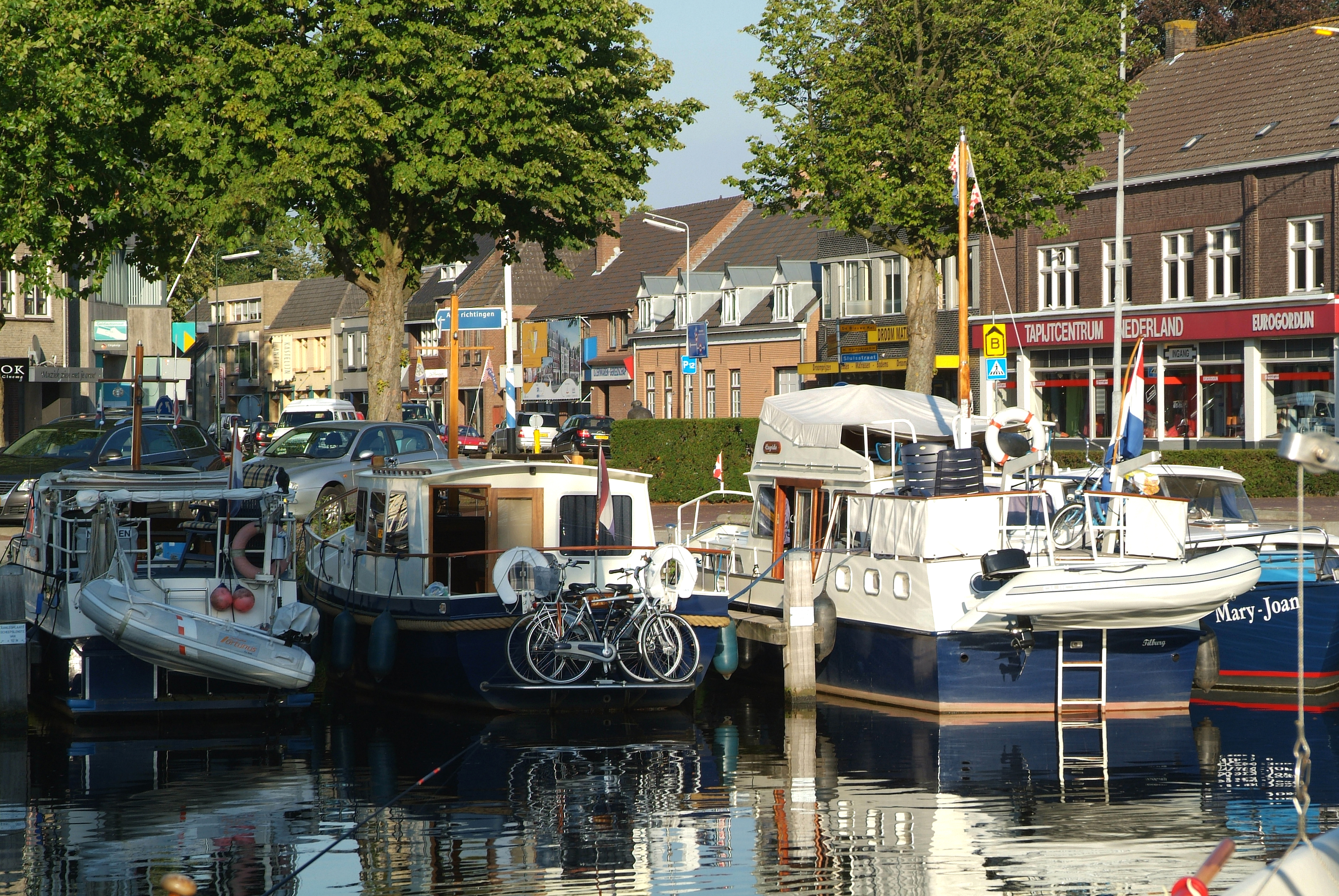
Marina of Veghel

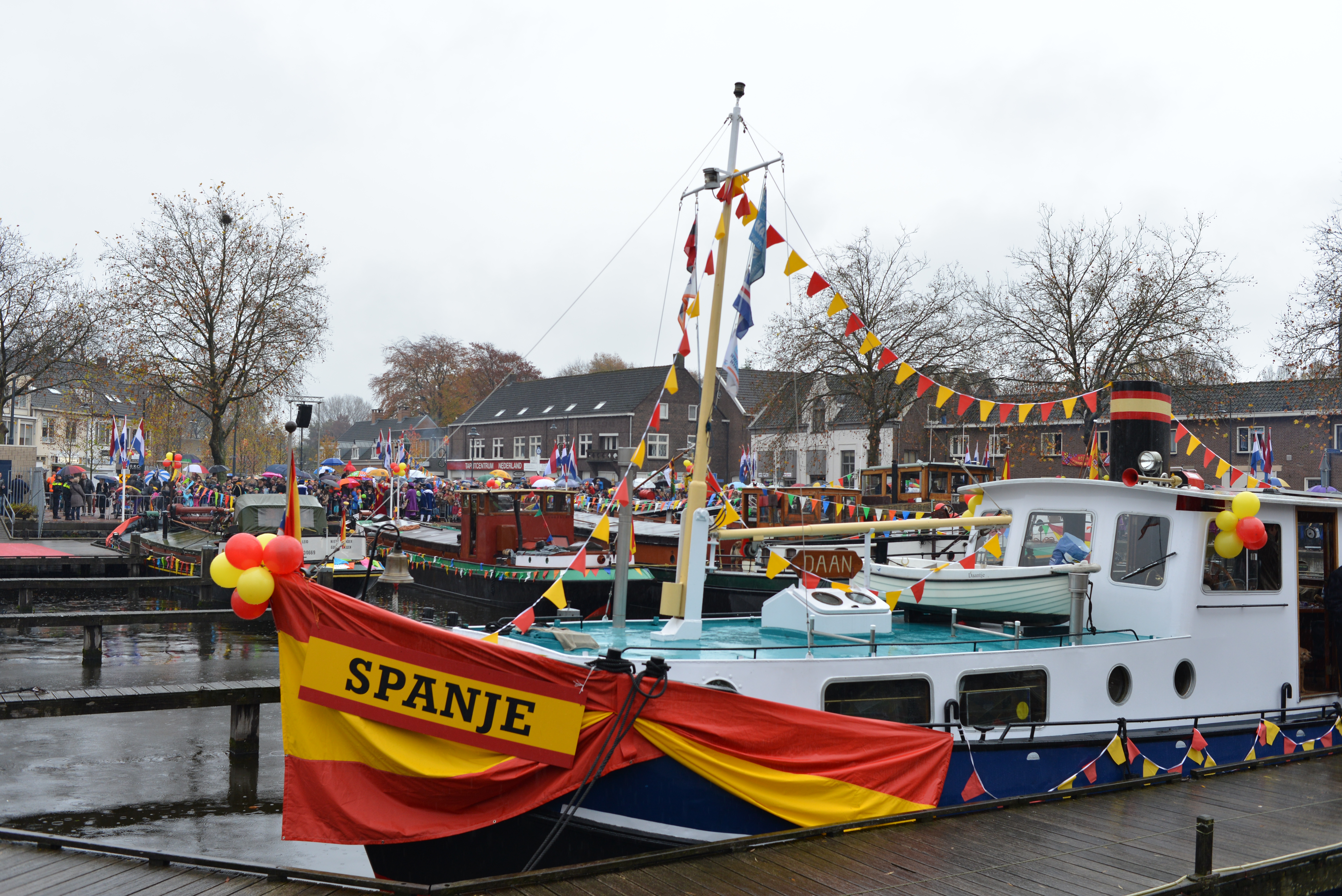
Marina of Veghel during the entry parade of Sinterklaas, 16 November 2014
