= Nyron Wau =

Dutch footballer (born 1982)

Personal information
- Date of birth: 24 November 1982 (age 43)
- Place of birth: Geldrop, Netherlands
- Height: 1.78 m (5 ft 10 in)
- Position: Right winger

Senior career*
Years	Team	Apps	(Gls)
2001–2005	PSV	0	(0)
2002–2003	→ MVV (loan)	32	(11)
2003–2005	→ Helmond Sport (loan)	62	(23)
2005–2006	RBC Roosendaal	16	(7)
2006–2008	→ Den Bosch (loan)	65	(23)
2008–2009	Nea Salamis	0	(0)
2009	Helmond Sport	15	(8)
2009–2010	AGOVV	16	(7)
2010	DAC Dunajská Streda		
2010	Dijkse Boys	10	(11)
2010	Dayton Dutch Lions		
2010–2014	Lutlommel		
Total		216	(90)
- * Club domestic league appearances and goals

Nyron Wau (born 24 November 1982) is a Dutch former professional footballer who played as a right winger, notably in the Eredivisie.

== Career ==
Wau played for PSV Eindhoven against PAOK in UEFA Cup 2001-02, being brought on in the last minute. However, he never made a league appearance for the Dutch club.

Wau signed a three-year contract Helmond Sport during the summer of 2004; however, the contract terminated early as he chose to join RBC Roosendaal on a two-year deal the following summer.

In November 2008, Wau was to trial with Australian club Newcastle Jets.
