= 2012–13 Eerste Klasse =

Eerste Klasse
- Season: 2012–13
- Relegated: 2013–14 Tweede Klasse

The 2012–13 Eerste Klasse season was the third edition of the Dutch fifth tier since the Topklasse was formed as the third tier in 2010.

A total of 84 teams participated in the league. As usual, the competition is divided into eleven divisions: five divisions played on Saturdays and six divisions played on Sunday.

The champion of each division was directly promoted to the 2013–14 Hoofdklasse. Saturday Champions were:

- SDV Barneveld
- Deltasport
- SV Oranje Wit
- AZSV
- Drachtster Boys

Sunday champions were:

- ASV De Dijk
- VOC Rotterdam
- VV De Valk
- RKSV Bekkerveld
- VV Alverna
- FVC Leeuwarden
