= Boerdonk =

- Village
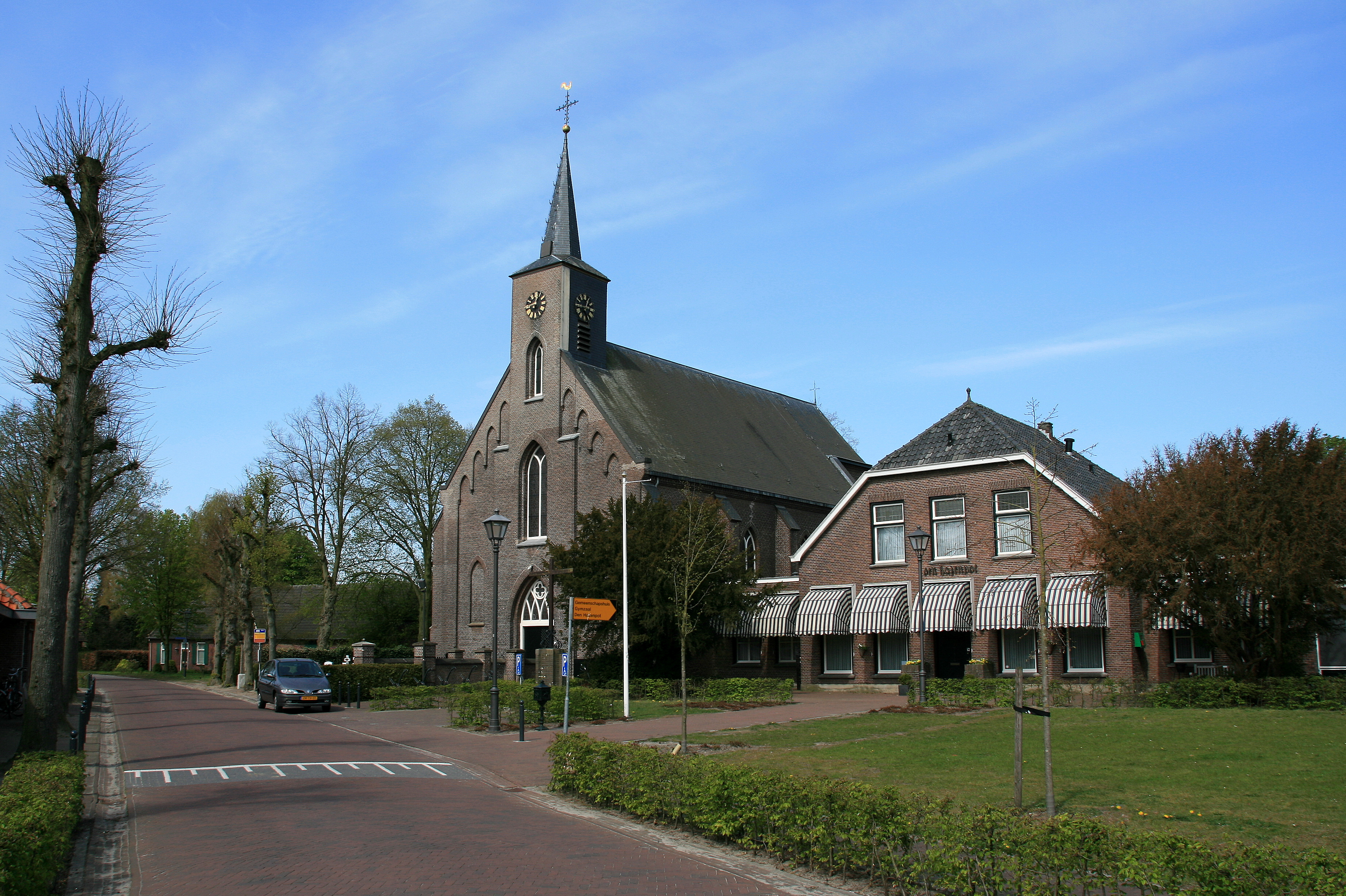
- Sint Servatiuskerk

- Location in the province of North Brabant in the Netherlands Boerdonk (Netherlands)
- Coordinates: 51°33′35″N 5°37′37″E
- Country: Netherlands
- Province: North Brabant
- Municipality: Meierijstad

Area
  - Total: 0.71 km^{2} (0.27 sq mi)
- Elevation: 11 m (36 ft)

Population (2021)
  - Total: 1,435
  - Density: 2,000/km^{2} (5,200/sq mi)
- Time zone: UTC+1 (CET)
  - Summer (DST): UTC+2 (CEST)
- Postal code: 5469
- Dialing code: 0413
- Major roads: N279

Boerdonk is a village in the south of the Netherlands. It is situated in the municipality of Meierijstad, North Brabant.

The village was first mentioned in 1311 as Boerdonc. It developed along the Boerdonkse Aa. Boerdonk was home to 177 people in 1840. Until the municipal reorganization of 1994, Boerdonk was located in the municipality of Erp. Since 2017, it is part of the municipality of Meierijstad.
