= Keldonk =

- Village
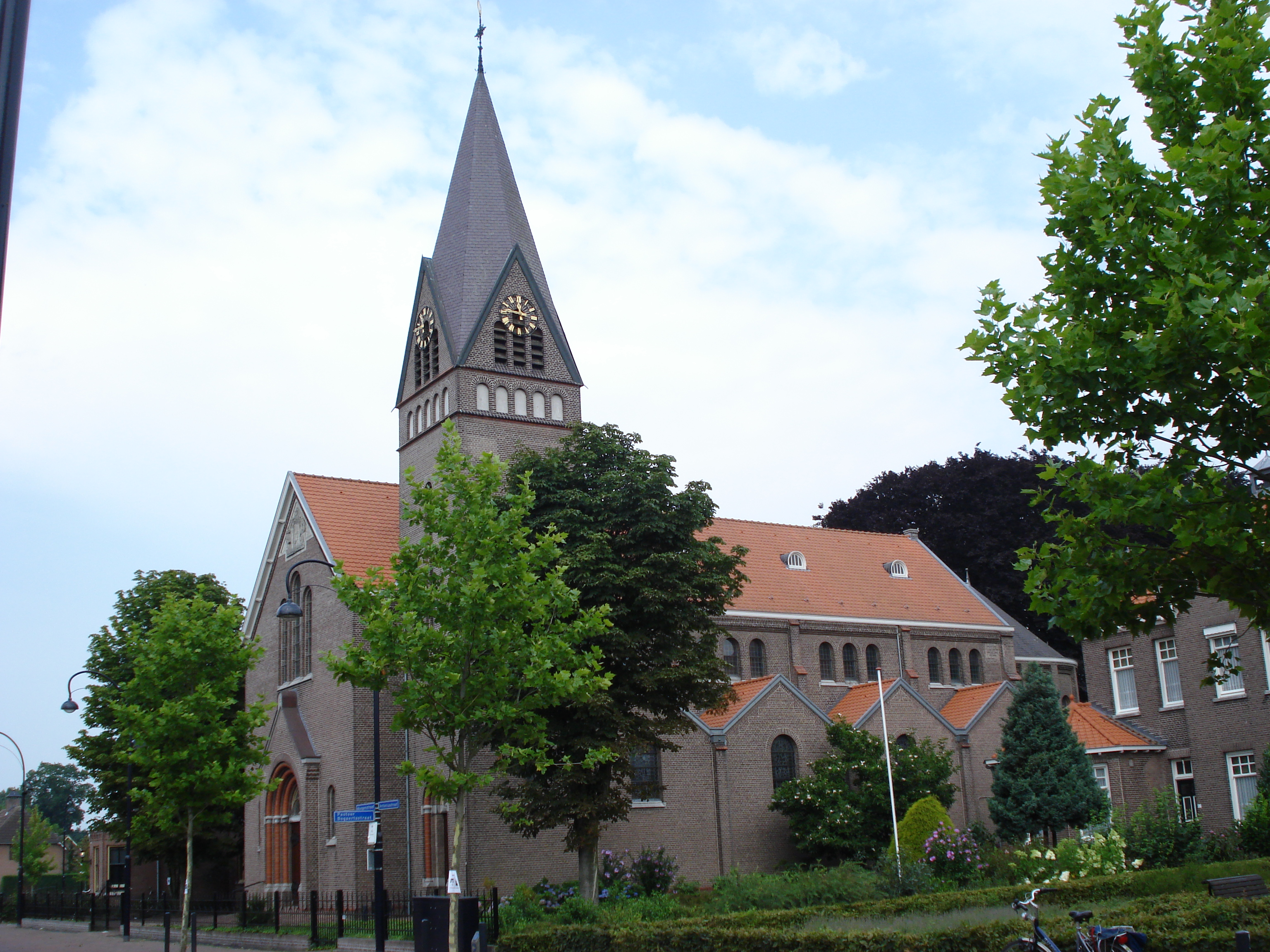
- St. Anthony of Padua Church in Keldonk

- Location in the province of North Brabant in the Netherlands Keldonk (Netherlands)
- Coordinates: 51°35′17″N 5°35′09″E
- Country: Netherlands
- Province: North Brabant
- Municipality: Meierijstad

Area
  - Total: 6.26 km^{2} (2.42 sq mi)
- Elevation: 11 m (36 ft)

Population (2021)
  - Total: 1,030
  - Density: 165/km^{2} (426/sq mi)
- Time zone: UTC+1 (CET)
  - Summer (DST): UTC+2 (CEST)
- Postal code: 5469
- Dialing code: 0413
- Major roads: N279

Keldonk is a village in the south of the Netherlands. It is situated in the municipality of Meierijstad, North Brabant.

Keldonk was home to 246 people in 1840. In 1912, the St. Anthony of Padua Church was built. Until the municipal reorganization of 1994, Keldonk was located in the municipality of Erp. In 2017, it became part of Meierijstad.

== Gallery ==
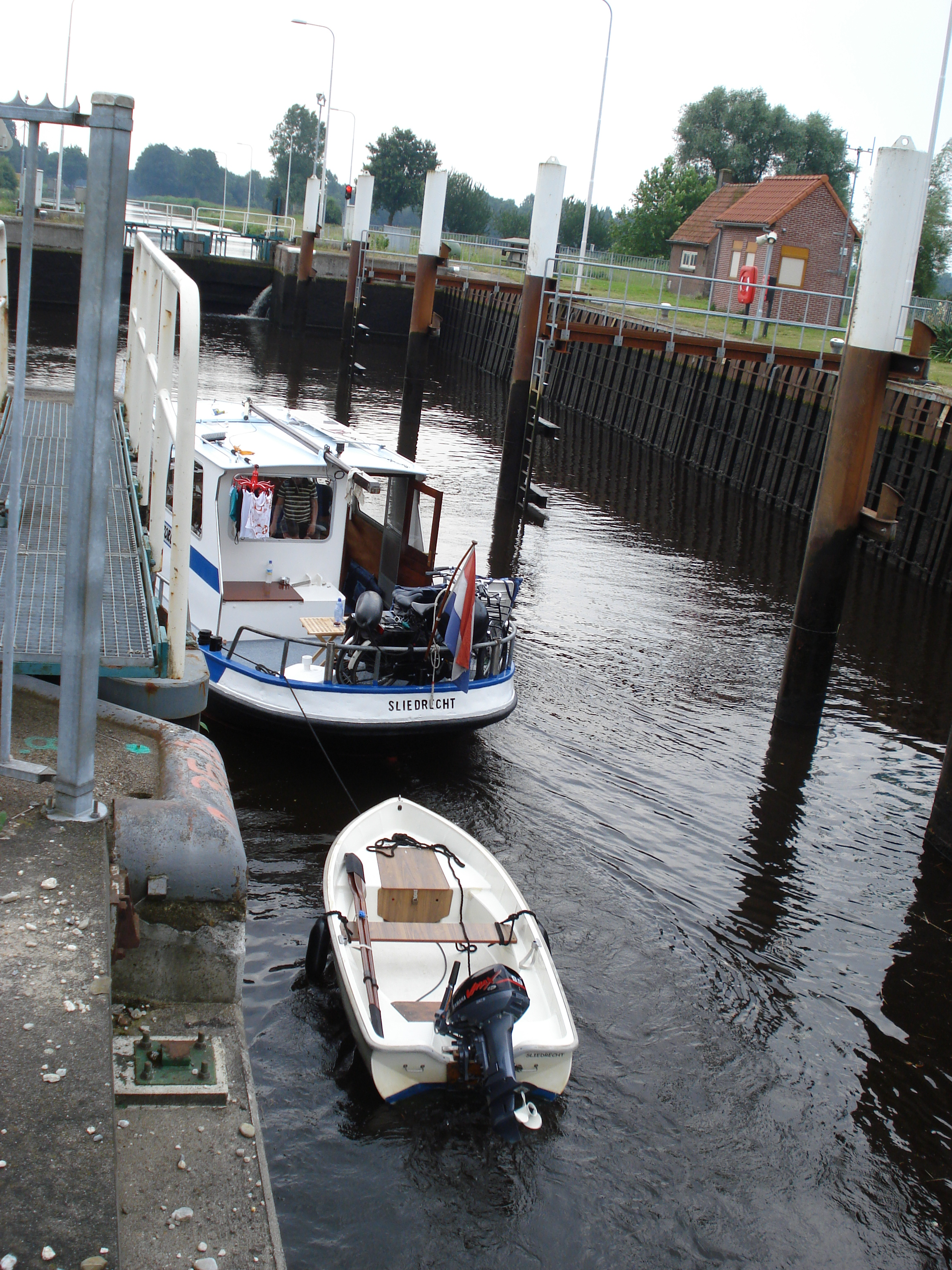
Sluice in the Zuidwillemsvaart

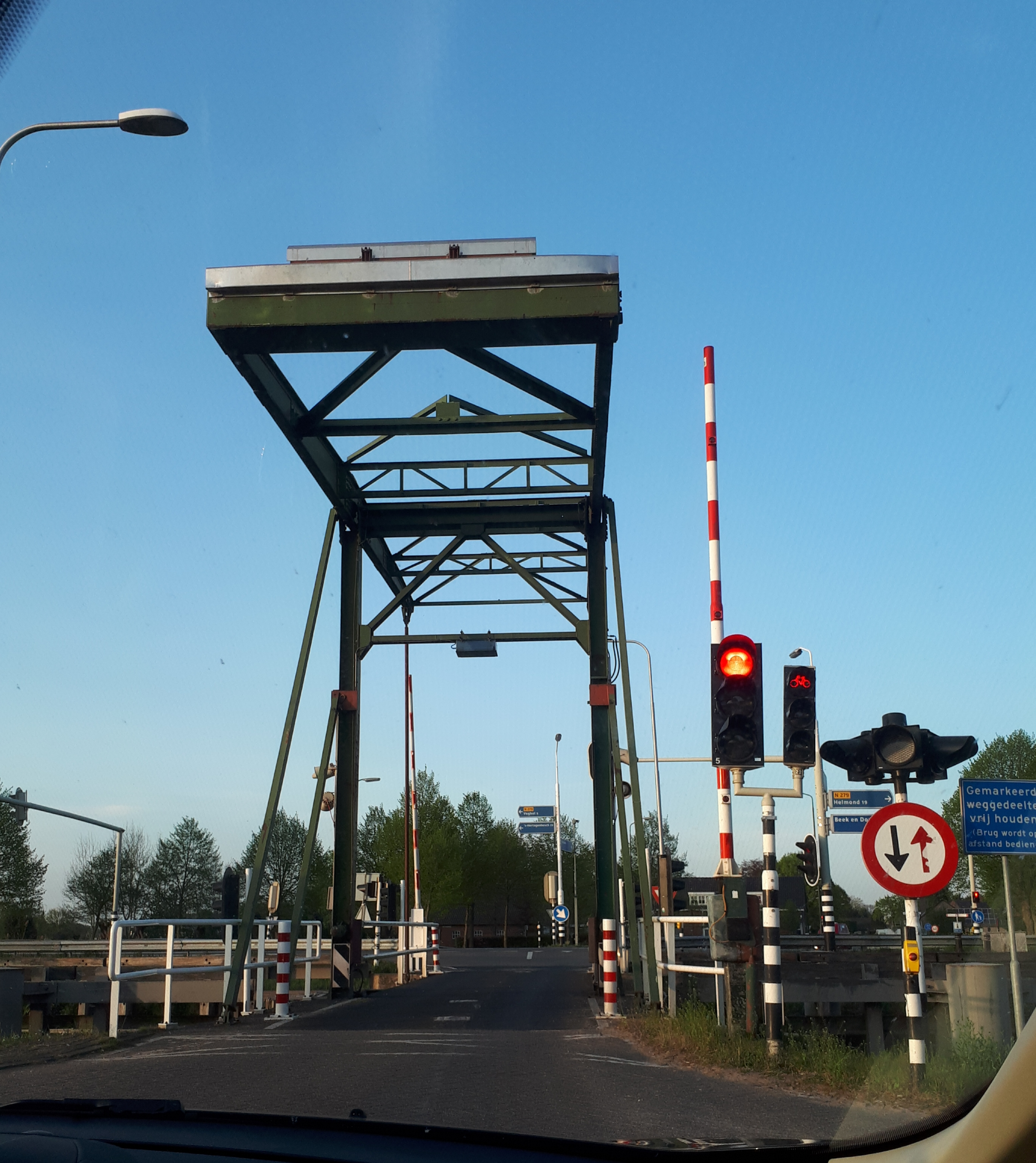
Draw bridge
