= 1987 Virginia Slims of Florida – Doubles =

Doubles
- 1987 Virginia Slims of Florida

Final
- Champions: (Soviet Union) Svetlana Parkhomenko (Soviet Union) Larisa Savchenko
- Runners-up: (United States) Chris Evert (United States) Pam Shriver
- Score: 6–0, 3–6, 6–2

Details
- Draw: 28
- Seeds: 8

Events
Singles	Doubles
← 1986 ·	Virginia Slims of Florida	· 1988 →

Kathy Jordan and Elizabeth Smylie were the two-time defending champions, but Jordan did not compete this year. Smylie teamed up with Jenny Byrne and lost in the first round to Bettina Bunge and Laura Gildemeister.

Svetlana Parkhomenko and Larisa Savchenko won the title by defeating Chris Evert and Pam Shriver 6–0, 3–6, 6–2 in the final.

== Seeds ==
The first four seeds received a bye to the second round.

1. (West Germany) Claudia Kohde-Kilsch / (Czechoslovakia) Helena Suková (semifinals)
2. (Czechoslovakia) Hana Mandlíková / (Australia) Wendy Turnbull (semifinals)
3. (United States) Chris Evert / (United States) Pam Shriver (final)
4. (United States) Elise Burgin / (South Africa) Rosalyn Fairbank (quarterfinals)
5. (Australia) Jenny Byrne / (Australia) Elizabeth Smylie (first round)
6. (Soviet Union) Svetlana Parkhomenko / (Soviet Union) Larisa Savchenko (champions)
7. (United States) Gigi Fernández / (United States) Sharon Walsh-Pete (quarterfinals)
8. (United Kingdom) Jo Durie / (United States) Alycia Moulton (first round)

== Draw ==
=== Key ===
- Q = Qualifier
- WC = Wild card
- LL = Lucky loser
- Alt = Alternate
- ITF = ITF entry
- PR = Protected ranking
- SR = Special ranking
- SE = Special exempt
- JE = Junior exempt
- JR = Junior Accelerator Programme entrant
- CO = College Accelerator Programme entrant
- NG = Next Gen Accelerator Program entrant
- w/o = Walkover
- r = Retired
- d = Defaulted

=== Finals ===
Semifinals
1	(West Germany) Claudia Kohde-Kilsch (Czechoslovakia) Helena Suková	7	4	6
3	(United States) Chris Evert (United States) Pam Shriver	6	6	7
6	(Soviet Union) Svetlana Parkhomenko (Soviet Union) Larisa Savchenko	6	6
2	(Czechoslovakia) Hana Mandlíková (Australia) Wendy Turnbull	2	4

Final
3	(United States) Chris Evert (United States) Pam Shriver	0	6	2
6	(Soviet Union) Svetlana Parkhomenko (Soviet Union) Larisa Savchenko	6	3	6

=== Top half ===
First round
(France) I Demongeot (France) N Tauziat	6	6
(Netherlands) M Bollegraf (Netherlands) N Jagerman	3	4
(United States) P Louie Harper (Czechoslovakia) R Maršíková	3	4
(United States) Ca MacGregor (United States) Cy MacGregor	6	6
(Japan) A Kijimuta (Australia) N Provis	7	5	2
7	(United States) G Fernández (United States) S Walsh-Pete	6	7	6
(South Africa) E Reinach (South Africa) M Reinach	5	6	6
(West Germany) A Betzner (Canada) H Kelesi	7	4	3
(United States) P Casale (United States) K Sands	2	1
(United States) P Fendick (Hong Kong) P Hy	6	6
(West Germany) B Bunge (Peru) L Gildemeister	6	6
5	(Australia) J Byrne (Australia) E Smylie	0	3

Second round
1	(West Germany) C Kohde-Kilsch (Czechoslovakia) H Suková	1	6	6
(France) I Demongeot (France) N Tauziat	6	2	2
(United States) Ca MacGregor (United States) Cy MacGregor	6	6	3
7	(United States) G Fernández (United States) S Walsh-Pete	7	3	6
3	(United States) C Evert (United States) P Shriver	6	6
(South Africa) E Reinach (South Africa) M Reinach	4	0
(United States) P Fendick (Hong Kong) P Hy
(West Germany) B Bunge (Peru) L Gildemeister	w/o

Quarterfinals
1	(West Germany) C Kohde-Kilsch (Czechoslovakia) H Suková	6	6
7	(United States) G Fernández (United States) S Walsh-Pete	0	0
3	(United States) C Evert (United States) P Shriver	7	0	6
(West Germany) B Bunge (Peru) L Gildemeister	5	6	3

Semifinals
1	(West Germany) C Kohde-Kilsch (Czechoslovakia) H Suková	7	4	6
3	(United States) C Evert (United States) P Shriver	6	6	7

=== Bottom half ===
First round
6	(Soviet Union) S Parkhomenko (Soviet Union) L Savchenko	6	6
(Brazil) N Dias (Brazil) P Medrado	2	1
(United States) T Phelps (Italy) R Reggi	6	7
(France) P Paradis (United States) J Russell	3	6
(Italy) S Cecchini (Socialist Federal Republic of Yugoslavia) S Goleš	6	6
(Czechoslovakia) I Budařová (United States) B Gerken	3	3
8	(United Kingdom) J Durie (United States) A Moulton	4	2
(United States) B Potter (United States) W White	6	6
(Canada) C Bassett (United States) G Magers	3	5
(Australia) A Minter (United States) M Van Nostrand	6	7
(United States) C Benjamin (South Africa) D Van Rensburg	1	7	4
(Sweden) C Lindqvist (Denmark) T Scheuer-Larsen	6	5	6

Second round
6	(Soviet Union) S Parkhomenko (Soviet Union) L Savchenko	6	6
(United States) T Phelps (Italy) R Reggi	2	4
(Italy) S Cecchini (Socialist Federal Republic of Yugoslavia) S Goleš	4	0
4	(United States) E Burgin (South Africa) R Fairbank	6	6
(United States) B Potter (United States) W White	6	7
(Australia) A Minter (United States) M Van Nostrand	4	6
(Sweden) C Lindqvist (Denmark) T Scheuer-Larsen	3	4
2	(Czechoslovakia) H Mandlíková (Australia) W Turnbull	6	6

Quarterfinals
6	(Soviet Union) S Parkhomenko (Soviet Union) L Savchenko	7	6	6
4	(United States) E Burgin (South Africa) R Fairbank	5	7	4
(United States) B Potter (United States) W White	3	7	2
2	(Czechoslovakia) H Mandlíková (Australia) W Turnbull	6	5	6

Semifinals
6	(Soviet Union) S Parkhomenko (Soviet Union) L Savchenko	6	6
2	(Czechoslovakia) H Mandlíková (Australia) W Turnbull	2	4
