= 1987 Virginia Slims of Florida – Singles =

Singles
- 1987 Virginia Slims of Florida

Final
- Champion: (West Germany) Steffi Graf
- Runner-up: (Czechoslovakia) Helena Suková
- Score: 6–2, 6–3

Details
- Draw: 56 (8Q/1LL)
- Seeds: 14

Events
Singles	Doubles
← 1986 ·	Virginia Slims of Florida	· 1988 →

Chris Evert was the three-time defending champion, but lost in the third round to Kate Gompert.

Steffi Graf won the title by defeating Helena Suková 6–2, 6–3 in the final.

== Seeds ==
The first eight seeds received a bye to the second round.

1. (United States) Chris Evert (third round)
2. (West Germany) Steffi Graf (champion)
3. (United States) Pam Shriver (semifinals)
4. (Czechoslovakia) Helena Suková (final)
5. (West Germany) Claudia Kohde-Kilsch (quarterfinals)
6. (Argentina) Gabriela Sabatini (semifinals)
7. (West Germany) Bettina Bunge (quarterfinals)
8. (Sweden) Catarina Lindqvist (third round)
9. (Italy) Raffaella Reggi (third round)
10. (United States) Terry Phelps (first round)
11. (Canada) Carling Bassett (first round)
12. (United States) Barbara Potter (first round)
13. (United States) Mary Joe Fernández (third round)
14. (Socialist Federal Republic of Yugoslavia) Sabrina Goleš (third round)

== Draw ==
=== Key ===
- Q = Qualifier
- WC = Wild card
- LL = Lucky loser
- Alt = Alternate
- ITF = ITF entry
- PR = Protected ranking
- SR = Special ranking
- SE = Special exempt
- JE = Junior exempt
- JR = Junior Accelerator Programme entrant
- CO = College Accelerator Programme entrant
- NG = Next Gen Accelerator Program entrant
- w/o = Walkover
- r = Retired
- d = Defaulted

=== Finals ===
Quarterfinals
(United States) Kate Gompert	2	1
6	(Argentina) Gabriela Sabatini	6	6
4	(Czechoslovakia) Helena Suková	3	6	7
7	(West Germany) Bettina Bunge	6	3	6
(United States) Gigi Fernández	3	3
3	(United States) Pam Shriver	6	6
5	(West Germany) Claudia Kohde-Kilsch	6	2
2	(West Germany) Steffi Graf	7	6

Semifinals
6	(Argentina) Gabriela Sabatini	6	3	1
4	(Czechoslovakia) Helena Suková	4	6	6
3	(United States) Pam Shriver	4	3
2	(West Germany) Steffi Graf	6	6

Final
4	(Czechoslovakia) Helena Suková	2	3
2	(West Germany) Steffi Graf	6	6

=== Top half ===
==== Section 1 ====
First round
(France) N Tauziat	6	4	4
(South Africa) E Reinach	4	6	6
(Czechoslovakia) R Maršíková	7	7
(United States) E Burgin	5	5
(United States) K Gompert	4	6	6
11	(Canada) C Bassett	6	4	3
9	(Italy) R Reggi	7	4	6
Q	(Argentina) P Tarabini	5	6	1
(Italy) L Garrone	6	2	4
(United States) G Magers	3	6	6
(United States) K Shaefer	6	4	4
(United Kingdom) A Croft	3	6	6

Second round
1	(United States) C Evert	6	6
(South Africa) E Reinach	4	2
(Czechoslovakia) R Maršíková	3	3
(United States) K Gompert	6	6
9	(Italy) R Reggi	6	6
(United States) G Magers	4	3
(United Kingdom) A Croft	2	4
6	(Argentina) G Sabatini	6	6

Third round
1	(United States) C Evert	6	4	2
(United States) K Gompert	3	6	6
9	(Italy) R Reggi	7	1	4
6	(Argentina) G Sabatini	6	6	6

Quarterfinals
(United States) K Gompert	2	1
6	(Argentina) G Sabatini	6	6

==== Section 2 ====
First round
Q	(Argentina) B Fulco	3	4
(United Kingdom) J Durie	6	6
Q	(Australia) N Provis	3	2
(United States) L Bonder	6	6
Q	(United States) P Fendick	6	6
Q	(United States) H Cioffi	3	1
14	(Socialist Federal Republic of Yugoslavia) S Goleš	6	6
(Argentina) M Paz	4	3
(France) C Tanvier	6	6	6
(Austria) P Huber	7	3	4
(United States) P Casale	4	6	6
(South Africa) R Fairbank	6	4	1

Second round
4	(Czechoslovakia) H Suková	6	6
(United Kingdom) J Durie	4	3
(United States) L Bonder	2	4
Q	(United States) P Fendick	6	6
14	(Socialist Federal Republic of Yugoslavia) S Goleš	4	6	3
(France) C Tanvier	6	1	0^{r}
(United States) P Casale	3	1
7	(West Germany) B Bunge	6	6

Third round
4	(Czechoslovakia) H Suková	3	6	7
Q	(United States) P Fendick	6	0	5
14	(Socialist Federal Republic of Yugoslavia) S Goleš	5	4
7	(West Germany) B Bunge	7	6

Quarterfinals
4	(Czechoslovakia) H Suková	3	6	7
7	(West Germany) B Bunge	6	3	6

=== Bottom half ===
==== Section 3 ====
First round
(Denmark) T Scheuer-Larsen	6	6
Q	(Netherlands) M Bollegraf	4	1
(France) N Herreman	2	1
(United States) A Moulton	6	6
(United States) M Torres	1	2
(United States) G Fernández	6	6
13	(United States) MJ Fernández	6	6
(Australia) E Smylie	3	3
(Soviet Union) L Savchenko	7	6
(United States) S Sloane	5	4
(France) I Demongeot	6	5	3
(South Africa) D Van Rensburg	2	7	6

Second round
8	(Sweden) C Lindqvist	7	6
(Denmark) T Scheuer-Larsen	5	1
(United States) A Moulton	2	2
(United States) G Fernández	6	6
13	(United States) MJ Fernández	6	6
(Soviet Union) L Savchenko	2	1
(South Africa) D Van Rensburg	3	2
3	(United States) P Shriver	6	6

Third round
8	(Sweden) C Lindqvist	6	2	4
(United States) G Fernández	3	6	6
13	(United States) MJ Fernández	2	1
3	(United States) P Shriver	6	6

Quarterfinals
(United States) G Fernández	3	3
3	(United States) P Shriver	6	6

==== Section 4 ====
First round
(West Germany) E Pfaff	4	6	6
Q	(Peru) P Vásquez	6	4	3
(Canada) H Kelesi	6	6
Q	(Brazil) P Medrado	2	4
(Peru) L Gildemeister	6	7
12	(United States) B Potter	4	5
10	(United States) T Phelps	5	6	6
(United Kingdom) S Gomer	7	2	7
(United States) M Van Nostrand	6	1
LL	(Australia) A Minter	7	6
(Greece) A Kanellopoulou	6	6
(United States) P Louie Harper	3	3

Second round
5	(West Germany) C Kohde-Kilsch	6	6
(West Germany) E Pfaff	4	2
(Canada) H Kelesi	0	7	6
(Peru) L Gildemeister	6	5	2
(United Kingdom) S Gomer	6	4	6
LL	(Australia) A Minter	2	6	3
(Greece) A Kanellopoulou	2	0
2	(West Germany) S Graf	6	6

Third round
5	(West Germany) C Kohde-Kilsch	6	4	6
(Canada) H Kelesi	1	6	2
(United Kingdom) S Gomer	0	0
2	(West Germany) S Graf	6	6

Quarterfinals
5	(West Germany) C Kohde-Kilsch	6	2
2	(West Germany) S Graf	7	6
