= 1986 Virginia Slims of Florida – Singles =

Singles
- 1986 Virginia Slims of Florida

Final
- Champion: (United States) Chris Evert Lloyd
- Runner-up: (West Germany) Steffi Graf
- Score: 6–3, 6–1

Details
- Draw: 56 (8Q/1LL)
- Seeds: 16

Events
Singles	Doubles
← 1985 ·	Virginia Slims of Florida	· 1987 →

Chris Evert Lloyd became the 3-time tournament winner after defeating Steffi Graf 6–3, 6–1 in the final.

== Seeds ==
The first eight seeds received a bye into the second round.

1. (United States) Chris Evert Lloyd (champion)
2. (West Germany) Steffi Graf (final)
3. (Bulgaria) Manuela Maleeva (semifinals)
4. (United States) Bonnie Gadusek (semifinals)
5. (United States) Kathy Rinaldi (third round)
6. (Argentina) Gabriela Sabatini (quarterfinals)
7. (Sweden) Catarina Lindqvist (second round)
8. (Australia) Wendy Turnbull (quarterfinals)
9. (Canada) Carling Bassett (third round)
10. (Hungary) Andrea Temesvári (third round)
11. (United States) Kathy Jordan (third round)
12. (United States) Stephanie Rehe (quarterfinals)
13. (West Germany) Bettina Bunge (first round)
14. (United Kingdom) Jo Durie (third round)
15. (n/a)
16. (n/a)

== Draw ==
=== Key ===
- Q = Qualifier
- WC = Wild card
- LL = Lucky loser
- Alt = Alternate
- SE = Special exempt
- PR = Protected ranking
- ITF = ITF entry
- JE = Junior exempt
- w/o = Walkover
- r = Retired
- d = Defaulted
- SR = Special ranking

=== Finals ===
Quarterfinals
1	(United States) Chris Evert Lloyd	6	6
12	(United States) Stephanie Rehe	1	0
3	(Bulgaria) Manuela Maleeva	6	6
6	(Argentina) Gabriela Sabatini	3	2
(United States) Kathleen Horvath	5	0
4	(United States) Bonnie Gadusek	7	6
8	(Australia) Wendy Turnbull	1	7	2
2	(West Germany) Steffi Graf	6	6	6

Semifinals
1	(United States) Chris Evert Lloyd	6	6
3	(Bulgaria) Manuela Maleeva	1	0
4	(United States) Bonnie Gadusek	0	2
2	(West Germany) Steffi Graf	6	6

Final
1	(United States) Chris Evert Lloyd	6	6
2	(West Germany) Steffi Graf	3	1

=== Top half ===
==== Section 1 ====
First round
(Austria) P Huber	6	6
LL	(United States) B Gerken	3	4
(Switzerland) L Drescher	6	1	2
(Soviet Union) L Savchenko	3	6	6
(United States) P Louie	1	4
9	(Canada) C Bassett	6	6
12	(United States) S Rehe	6	7
Q	(France) N Tauziat	4	5
(United States) D Spence	6	6	7
(Australia) E Smylie	7	0	5
(United States) B Nagelsen	6	1	3
Q	(France) MC Calleja	2	6	6

Second round
1	(United States) C Evert Lloyd	6	6
(Austria) P Huber	2	1
(Soviet Union) L Savchenko	2	4
9	(Canada) C Bassett	6	6
12	(United States) S Rehe	6	6
(United States) D Spence	1	2
Q	(France) MC Calleja	5	1
5	(United States) K Rinaldi	7	6

Third round
1	(United States) C Evert Lloyd	6	6
9	(Canada) C Bassett	1	0
12	(United States) S Rehe	6	4	6
5	(United States) K Rinaldi	3	6	4

Quarterfinals
1	(United States) C Evert Lloyd	6	6
12	(United States) S Rehe	1	0

==== Section 2 ====
First round
Q	(Australia) J Tremelling	6	7
(Italy) R Reggi	4	5
(France) C Tanvier	6	2	6
(South Africa) R Fairbank	3	6	2
(United Kingdom) A Hobbs	5	5
11	(United States) K Jordan	7	7
Q	(Japan) E Inoue	2	3
(United States) S Mascarin	6	6
Q	(United States) N Sodupe	4	7	5
(Australia) D Balestrat	6	6	7
(United Kingdom) A Croft	7	2	6
(United States) T Phelps	6	6	2

Second round
3	(Bulgaria) M Maleeva	4	6	6
Q	(Australia) J Tremelling	6	3	2
(France) C Tanvier	1	4
11	(United States) K Jordan	6	6
(United States) S Mascarin	6	7
(Australia) D Balestrat	2	6
(United Kingdom) A Croft	0	1
6	(Argentina) G Sabatini	6	6

Third round
3	(Bulgaria) M Maleeva	6	6
11	(United States) K Jordan	3	1
(United States) S Mascarin	7	0	4
6	(Argentina) G Sabatini	6	6	6

Quarterfinals
3	(Bulgaria) M Maleeva	6	6
6	(Argentina) G Sabatini	3	2

=== Bottom half ===
==== Section 3 ====
First round
Q	(United States) J Forman	6	6	3
(United States) K Horvath	7	3	6
(Denmark) T Scheuer-Larsen	6	6
(New Zealand) B Cordwell	2	1
(West Germany) E Pfaff	3	1
10	(Hungary) A Temesvári	6	6
14	(United Kingdom) J Durie	6	7
(Bulgaria) K Maleeva	1	6
(United States) C Reynolds	6	5	0^{r}
(Australia) A Minter	4	7	2
(Peru) L Gildemeister	4	6	6
(Switzerland) C Jolissaint	6	3	7

Second round
7	(Sweden) C Lindqvist	6	1	3
(United States) K Horvath	4	6	6
(Denmark) T Scheuer-Larsen	3	3
10	(Hungary) A Temesvári	6	6
14	(United Kingdom) J Durie	6	6
(Australia) A Minter	2	3
(Switzerland) C Jolissaint	2	2
4	(United States) B Gadusek	6	6

Third round
(United States) K Horvath	0	6	6
10	(Hungary) A Temesvári	6	2	2
14	(United Kingdom) J Durie	5	4
4	(United States) B Gadusek	7	6

Quarterfinals
(United States) K Horvath	5	0
4	(United States) B Gadusek	7	6

==== Section 4 ====
First round
(Socialist Federal Republic of Yugoslavia) S Goleš	6	2	2
(United States) A Ivan	4	6	6
(Italy) S Cecchini	3	6	6
(Sweden) C Karlsson	6	4	4
Q	(Czechoslovakia) R Maršíková	3	5
Q	(Greece) A Kanellopoulou	6	7
13	(West Germany) B Bunge	4	4
(United States) M Torres	6	6
(United States) P Casale	6	2
(United States) MJ Fernández	7	6
(United States) A Moulton	6	6
(Czechoslovakia) I Budařová	4	3

Second round
8	(Australia) W Turnbull	2	6	6
(United States) A Ivan	6	4	2
(Italy) S Cecchini	4	6	6
Q	(Greece) A Kanellopoulou	6	3	3
(United States) M Torres	3	3
(United States) MJ Fernández	6	6
(United States) A Moulton	6	4	1
2	(West Germany) S Graf	3	6	6

Third round
8	(Australia) W Turnbull	6	6
(Italy) S Cecchini	1	3
(United States) MJ Fernández	0	1
2	(West Germany) S Graf	6	6

Quarterfinals
8	(Australia) W Turnbull	1	7	2
2	(West Germany) S Graf	6	6	6
