= Chris Evert's Grand Slam history =

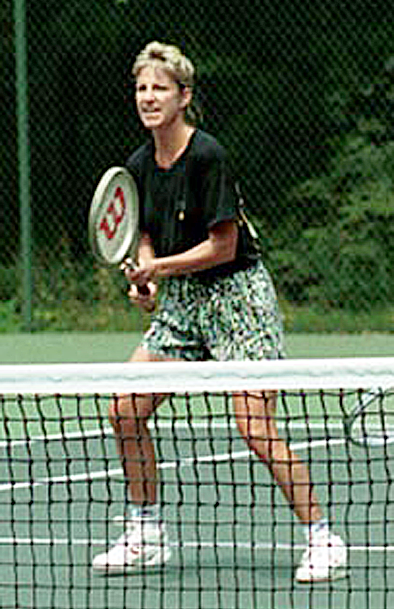
Evert won 18 Grand Slam Tournaments in her career.

Chris Evert won eighteen grand slam singles tournaments in her career (two Australian Opens, seven French Opens, three Wimbledon Championships, and six US Opens), and was runner-up in sixteen other finals (giving her 34 final appearances). Evert competed in 56 Grand Slam singles tournaments, reaching the semifinals or better in 52 of them.

== 1971-1973: Early Grand Slam career ==
=== 1971 ===
Evert made her Grand Slam debut at age 16 at the 1971 US Open; she received an invitation after winning the national sixteen-and-under championship. After an easy straight-sets win over Edda Buding in the first round, she faced the American No. 4 Mary-Ann Eisel in the second round. Evert saved six match points, with Eisel at one point serving at 6–4, 6–5, 40–0 in the second set, before coming back to win 4–6, 7–6, 6–1. She made two further comebacks from a set down, against Françoise Dürr and Lesley Hunt, before losing in straight sets to Billie Jean King in the semifinals. The match was played before a crowd of 13,500 fans in attendance, which included then-Vice President Spiro Agnew. After the match, King said to Evert: "Don't let it bother you Chris. You've got your whole life ahead of you." This defeat ended a 46-match winning streak built up through a variety of professional and junior tour events.

=== 1972 ===
Evert made her first semifinal at Wimbledon against Evonne Goolagong. Evert was up one set, 3–1 in the second set but Goolagong rallied back to win the match 4–6, 6–3, 6–4. After the match, Evert said, "I will be playing Evonne many times again, and next time the pressure will be on her. There are plenty more Wimbledons ahead."

At the US Open, she reached the semifinals again, losing to Kerry Melville 6–4, 6–2.

=== 1973 ===
Evert played in her first ever Grand Slam final at the French Open, losing to Margaret Court in a hard-fought match 6–7, 7–6, 6–4. She later praised Court for “gut-sing out the match”.

At Wimbledon, Evert lost in the final against defending champion Billie Jean King. The match was delayed by a day and Evert said “I was up for the match a little better yesterday... Today I wasn't 100 per cent eager to play.” Evert conceded a lopsided first set 6–0 in just 17-minutes. In the second set, King broke Evert's serve to go up 2–0 but was broken back at 4–2. King eventually won the set in the twelfth game at 7–5, giving her a fifth Wimbledon singles title. Evert said of King, “she was too tough... She didn't make a single error. She played great.”

At the US Open, Evert once again reached the semifinals. Playing against Margaret Court, she lost a tight first set 7–5. In the second set, Evert made many passing shots against Court, exploiting poor court tactics by her opponent to win the set 7–5. In the third set, Court went back to the game plan she used to win the first set. Court broke Evert's serve in the fourth game, and took the set 6–2. Court went on to win the final, her fifth US Open and her last Grand Slam title.

== 1974–1976: Imposing dominance ==
=== 1974 ===
Evert played her first Australian Open in 1974, losing in the final against Evonne Goolagong 7–6, 4–6, 6–0. Evert hit a bad lob at 5–6 in the first-set tiebreaker, giving the set to Goolagong. Evert took an early 4–1 lead to push for a third set. In the deciding set, she failed to win a single game, saying afterward that she played "a bit sloppy".

At the French Open, Evert won her first Grand Slam title against her friend Olga Morozova in the final 6–1, 6–2. In the second set, Morozova broke Evert's serve in the fifth and seventh games but failed to hold her own serve during the entire set. Throughout the match, Morozova's net approaches were stymied by Evert's effective passing shots and lobs. Morozova was also Evert's doubles partner at the event, which they won against Gail Lovera and Katja Ebbinghaus 6–4, 2–6, 6–1. This was the first Grand Slam doubles title in Evert's career.

At Wimbledon, Evert survived a second-round scare against Lesley Hunt, defeating her 8–6, 5–7, 11–9. She then proceeded to reach the final, where she again defeated Morozova, 6–1, 6–4.

In September, Evert, seeded first for the first time in a Grand Slam tournament, reached the semifinals of the US Open, where she was defeated by Goolagong 6–0, 6–7, 6–3.

=== 1975 ===
At the French Open, Evert successfully defended her title. In the final, she played Martina Navratilova in their first of 14 Grand Slam finals. Evert played a poor first set, which Navratilova won 6–2. She then regained her focus and cruised through the next two sets, winning the title 2–6, 6–2, 6–1. Evert and Navratilova partnered up to win the women's doubles title, beating Julie Anthony and Olga Morozova 6–3, 6–2.

Evert failed to defend her title at 1975 Wimbledon Championships losing to Billie Jean King in the semi-finals 2–6, 6–2, 6–3.

At the US Open, she lost only eight games in her first four matches. In the semifinals, she defeated Navratilova 6–4, 6–4. In the final, she beat Evonne Goolagong Cawley 5–7, 6–4, 6–2 to win her first of four consecutive US Open titles. 1975 was notable for being the first US Open to be played on clay, Evert's best surface.

=== 1976 ===
Evert did not play at the French Open, electing instead to participate in World Team Tennis. At Wimbledon, Evert cruised through her first five rounds before meeting Martina Navratilova in the semifinals. She defeated Navratilova 6–3, 4–6, 6–4 in their first of nine meetings at Wimbledon. Evert went on to defeat Evonne Goolagong Cawley in a tightly contested final, 6–3, 4–6, 8–6. In the third set, Evert served for the championship at 5–4 but three straight unforced errors gave the break to Cawley. Evert was able to break again at 6-6 and close out the match on her serve. Evert and Navratilova also partnered up to win the women's doubles title, defeating Billie Jean King and Betty Stöve 6–3, 6–2. While this was Evert's last doubles Grand Slam title, Navratilova would go on to have a highly successful doubles career, winning another six Wimbledon championships with partners Billie Jean King and Pam Shriver.

At the US Open, Evert again faced Cawley in the final. This time, she won in decisive fashion, defeating Cawley 6–3, 6–0. Evert lost only 12 games during the entire tournament, setting a record for the fewest games lost by a Grand Slam champion in Open Era history, although she only played six matches due to the draw having 96 players instead of 128 as is standard today. Evert later called 1976 "the best year of my life."

== 1977–1979: New challengers ==
=== 1977 ===
As in 1976, Evert participated in World Team Tennis instead of playing at the French Open.

Evert failed to defend her Wimbledon title, losing to Virginia Wade 6–2, 4–6, 6–1 in the semi-finals. During the match, she committed 25 unforced errors, including six double faults. A disappointed Evert later commented: "I could not reach deep inside of myself and pull out what I needed to win the match."

At the US Open, she cruised through her first four matches, losing only eight games. In the quarterfinals, she dispatched four-time winner Billie Jean King 6–2, 6–0. In the final, Evert defeated 12th-seed Wendy Turnbull 7–6, 6–2, becoming the first player to win three consecutive US Open women's singles titles since Maureen Connolly in 1953. This was Evert's third consecutive US Open victory, and her seventh Grand Slam title.

=== 1978 ===
Evert again elected to play World Team Tennis in May instead of the French Open.

At Wimbledon, she defeated Virginia Wade in the semifinals in a rematch of their encounter the previous year. Martina Navratilova then beat Evert in the championship match 2–6, 6–4, 7–5. Evert led 4–2 in the final set but Navratilova rallied back to win her first Grand Slam title. With that win, Navratilova overtook Evert for the world No. 1 ranking for the first time in her career. After the match, Evert told the press that "[Navratilova] played her best when she got behind. She never got flustered. In the past, I've been the consistent one when the going got tough. Today it was different."

At the US Open, she reached the final without losing a set. She then defeated sixteen-year-old Pam Shriver in the final 7–5, 6–4 to win her fourth consecutive US Open title. Evert led 4–3 with a break in the first set but was broken back after making three double faults. After the match, Evert said "I was disgusted with those three double-faults... when I get nervous, serving is one of the first things that goes. But even at 5-4, I felt very confident. I didn't think there was any way I could lose." That win was Evert's first major hard court title, as the US Open was moved that year from the West Side Tennis Club in Forest Hills to the National Tennis Center in Flushing Meadows, where it remains to this day. Evert remains the only female player in the Open Era to win the US Open four consecutive times.

=== 1979 ===
In May, Evert came back to the French Open after a four-year absence. She reached the final without difficulty, with the exception of a first-set loss to Ivanna Madruga in the third round. Playing in 90-degree weather, Evert dispatched fourth-seed Wendy Turnbull 6–2, 6–0 in the final in just 63 minutes. Evert said of winning her third French title that "this is a good tournament for me to win because I haven't done anything spectacular this year... it should help to build my confidence before Wimbledon although playing on grass will be completely different."

At Wimbledon, Evert reached the final without losing a set and again faced Navratilova for the title. Navratilova defeated Evert 6–4, 6–4.

At the US Open, Evert lost in the final to 16 year-old Tracy Austin 6–4, 6–3, putting an end to her 31-match winning streak at the tournament.

== 1980–1986: Peak of rivalry with Navratilova ==
=== 1980 ===
At the French Open, Evert lost two sets on the road to the final, against Bettina Bunge in the third round and against seventh-seed Hana Mandlíková in the semifinals. In the final, she defeated 1978 French Open Champion Virginia Ruzici 6–0, 6–3. The match featured lengthy rallies between Evert and Ruzici that frequently lasted 20 to 30 shots. After the match, Evert commented: "at the start of this year, I didn't know what my future would be... but this win has give me my confidence back in time for Wimbledon."

At Wimbledon, Evert, seeded third after being overtaken by Tracy Austin in the WTA ranking, faced Martina Navratilova for the third consecutive year, this time in the semifinals. Evert defeated Navratilova 4–6, 6–4, 6–2. In the final, she was defeated by Evonne Goolagong Cawley 6–1, 7–6. Evert failed to win her serve throughout the first set. The match was also notable for being the first Wimbledon singles final, men's or women's, to end on a tiebreak.

Coming to the US Open without the title of defending champion for the first time in five years, Evert won her first five matches without the loss of a set. She then played a highly anticipated semifinal against Tracy Austin in a rematch of the previous year's final. After losing the first set, Evert won 12 of the following 14 games and defeated Austin 4–6, 6–1, 6–1. She then defeated Hana Mandlíková 5–7, 6–1, 6–1 in the championship match.

=== 1981 ===
At the 1981 French Open, Evert failed to make the final for the first time in her career, losing to Hana Mandlíková in the semifinals 7–5, 6–4.

At Wimbledon, Evert, seeded first, cruised to the final, defeating Mima Jaušovec and Pam Shriver in the quarterfinals and semifinals respectively. She then beat Hana Mandlíková in the final 6–2, 6–2, avenging her loss at the French Open a month prior. Evert held her serve during the entirety of the match. Throughout the fortnight, she did not lose a set and only lost 26 games in total.

In September, Evert was defeated in the semifinals of the US Open by Martina Navratilova 7–5, 4–6, 6–4, ending a streak of six consecutive finals in New York.

In December, she came back to the Australian Open for the first time since her debut appearance in 1974. In a closely contested final, she was defeated by Navratilova 6–7, 6–4, 7–5.

=== 1982 ===
Evert lost in the semifinals of the French Open to American Andrea Jaeger 6–3, 6–1, the second year in a row that she failed to reach the final. At the time, the match was also Evert's most lopsided Grand Slam loss since the beginning of her career.

At Wimbledon, she defeated 38-year old Billie Jean King 7–6, 2–6, 6–3 in the semifinals. In the final, Martina Navratilova beat Evert 6–1, 3–6, 6–2. Evert broke Navratilova at 1–1 in the third set but failed to win another game thereafter. Evert later commented: "Martina played well under pressure and she won the match. I didn't give it to her."

At the US Open, Evert reached the final without difficulties, with the exception of a first-set loss against Bonnie Gadusek in the quarterfinals. In the final, she easily defeated fifth-seed Hana Mandlíková 6–3, 6–1 in 64 minutes. The win gave Evert her sixth and final US Open title. After the match, Evert said "the first time you win Wimbledon or the US Open is really a thrill, but I appreciate and maybe have a place in history by winning a sixth, so I can understand that a little better."

In December, she completed the Career Grand Slam by winning her first Australian Open title. In a rematch of the previous year's final, Evert defeated Navratilova 6–3, 2–6, 6–3 in the championship match. She later told reporters "I have wanted this tournament so badly. Then it was over and I had won it... it was a very emotional moment for me because this title meant so much... the Australian title has been the missing link in my career. I am not thinking about retiring, but I would have hated to look back in 10 years and see something missing from my career."

=== 1983 ===
At the 1983 French Open, Evert had to battle through two three-set matches in the fourth round and quarterfinals, against Helena Suková and Hana Mandlíková respectively. In the semifinals, she beat Andrea Jaeger 6–3, 6–1. The final saw Evert defeat 1977 champion Mima Jaušovec 6–1, 6–2 in 65 minutes.

At Wimbledon, Evert lost in the third round to Kathy Jordan. As she was recovering from the a stomach virus, she had requested to have her match moved to the following day, but was denied. That loss marked the first time in Evert's career that she lost prior to the semifinals of a Grand Slam.

At the US Open, she faced Martina Navratilova in the championship match, their first encounter in a US Open final. Navratilova easily dominated the match, defeating Evert 6–1, 6–3.

Evert withdrew from the Australian Open two weeks before the start of the tournament, citing a foot injury.

=== 1984 ===
This year is significant as it was the only time she reached all 4 finals in one calendar year.

Beginning at the 1984 French Open, Evert struggled to find her form, losing three sets on the road to the final: to Larisa Savchenko in the third round, to Manuela Maleeva in the fourth round, and to Carling Bassett in the quarterfinals. In the final, she was defeated by Martina Navratilova 6–3, 6–1 in 63 minutes. Evert's only opportunity came at 1–1 in the second set when she had three break points, but Navratilova saved all of them.

At the 1984 Wimbledon Championships, Navratilova defeated Evert in the final 7–6, 6–2.

In September, Evert cruised through her first six matches at the US Open. In the final, she faced Navratilova for the third consecutive time in a Grand Slam final. Navratilova again defeated Evert, this time in three competitive sets, 4–6, 6–4, 6–4.

At the 1984 Australian Open, she faced surprise finalist Helena Suková, who had upset Navratilova in the semifinals. Evert defeated Sukova 6–7, 6–1, 6–3. Evert said of not playing her Navratilova in the final: "I suppose it was a bit of an anti-climax, but I fought that feeling. I wanted to still be hungry," which gave her the motivation to win the title. During the fortnight Evert became the first player in the Open Era to win 1,000 matches.

=== 1985 ===
At the French Open, Evert defeated rising stars Steffi Graf in the fourth round and Gabriela Sabatini in the semifinals. In the final, she faced Martina Navratilova in a rematch of the previous year's final. In what is often considered the greatest match of their rivalry and one of the greatest women's matches of all time, Evert defeated Navratilova 6–3, 6–7, 7–5 in two hours and 52 minutes to win her sixth French Open title and reclaim the number one world ranking for the first time since June 1982. Her victory came after a string of four major final losses against Navratilova. Earlier in the year, Evert had broken a 13-match losing streak against her rival at the Virginia Slims of Florida.

After the match, she said "when I hit the last winner down the line I was really proud of myself...I never gave up and when I finally got to match point I went for a winner and I hit it. I had held my emotions in for so long that I really kind of let go." Evert still regards this match as the "most satisfying" win of her career.

At 1985 Wimbledon Championships, both Evert and Navratilova were seeded #1, reflecting Evert's status as the #1 ranked player and Navratilova's as the three-time defending champion, with no seed #2 awarded. This unique decision was heavily criticized by the Women's Tennis Association. As Evert was placed at the top of the draw sheet, she was the de facto #1. An in-form Evert lost just 16 games in her first six matches. Nevertheless, she was defeated in the final by Navratilova 4–6, 6–3, 6–2.

Evert did not make the final at the US Open, losing to eventual champion Hana Mandlíková, 4–6, 6–2, 6–3 in the semifinals.

At the Australian Open, Evert once again reached the final, losing one set along the way to Betsy Nagelsen in the second round. In the final, she was defeated by Navratilova 6–2, 4–6, 6–2.

=== 1986 ===
At the French Open, Evert asked for and received a Wednesday start to have additional time for her injured left knee to recover. She lost one set on the road to the final to Gabriela Sabatini in the fourth round. In the final, she played Martina Navratilova for the third consecutive year. Evert defeated her 2–6, 6–3, 6–3 to win her seventh French Open title. The match would be the rivals' last meeting in a Grand Slam final. In the first set, she double faulted four times in her first two service games of the match, helping Navratilova win the first set in only 30 minutes. In the second set, Evert dealt with the windy conditions better and was able to break Navratilova's serve in the fourth game. During the third set, Evert was down 0–2 but rallied back to win six of the last seven games. Her record of seven women's singles French Open titles remains unbeaten to this day.

Following her French Open victory, Evert only played in three more WTA tour events, including Wimbledon and the US Open. At Wimbledon, she lost in the semifinals in two tight sets against Hana Mandlíková 7–6, 7–5. At the US Open, she also lost in the semifinals to Helena Suková 6–2, 6–4. Following the US Open, Evert took a 6 month-injury layoff due to a troublesome left knee (chrondomalacia patella) that had been plaguing her throughout the spring and summer.

== 1987–1989: Final years on the tour ==
=== 1987 ===
Evert failed to defend her title at the French Open, losing in the semifinals to Martina Navratilova, 6–2, 6–2. At Wimbledon, she again lost in the semifinals to Navratilova by 6–2, 5–7, 6–4.

In September, Evert reached the quarterfinals of the US Open, losing to Lori McNeil 3–6, 6–2, 6–4. This quarterfinal loss, the earliest on her US Open career, ended a streak of 16 straight semifinal appearances at the US Open.

=== 1988 ===
Evert played her last Grand Slam final at the Australian Open, where she was defeated by Steffi Graf 6–1, 7–6. which she faced Graf in their first of only two meetings in a grand slam tournament. After just three games, there was a rain delay of one hour and 23 minutes to close the roof of the new Rod Laver Arena, making it the first time a Grand Slam final was played indoors. Evert was down 1–5 in the second set but came back to force a tiebreak, which she lost 7–3.

At the French Open, Evert, plagued by a troublesome bone spur in her heel, lost in the third round to future three-time winner Arantxa Sánchez Vicario 6–1 7–6, only her second loss before the quarterfinals of a major in her career, and her first since Wimbledon in 1983. Evert then lost in the semifinals to Martina Navratilova at Wimbledon 6–1, 4–6, 7–5. The match ended on a controversial line call. In September, Evert was forced to withdraw from the semifinals of the 1988 US Open with the flu.

=== 1989 ===
In January, Evert announced that 1989 would be the final season of her professional career. Concurrently, she asked the WTA to allow to play a reduced schedule. Evert did not play at the Australian Open. She made three finals at the beginning of the year, including a three-set loss to Steffi Graf at the Virginia Slims of Florida). She pulled out of the clay court season after a few early losses and also withdrew from the Wimbledon warm-up tournament in Eastbourne with an inner ear infection.

At Wimbledon Championships, Evert lost in the semifinals to eventual champion Graf 6–2, 6–1.

She then played the final Grand Slam of her career at the US Open. In the fourth-round, she faced 15-year old Monica Seles in a highly anticipated match following Seles's defeat of Evert in the final of the Virginia Slims of Houston. Evert easily defeated Seles 6–0, 6–2. In the quarterfinals, she was unable to find her form and lost to Zina Garrison 7–6^{(1–7)}, 6–2, despite leading 5–2 in the first set. In her press conference after the match, Evert commented on her squandered lead: "Well, that's one of the reasons I'm retiring... I played a great match two days ago. Today I was flat. It's been like that all year. That's why it's time..."
