= 1986 Virginia Slims of Florida – Doubles =

Doubles
- 1986 Virginia Slims of Florida

Final
- Champions: (United States) Kathy Jordan (Australia) Elizabeth Smylie
- Runners-up: (United States) Betsy Nagelsen (United States) Barbara Potter
- Score: 7–6, 2–6, 6–2

Details
- Draw: 32
- Seeds: 8

Events
| Singles | Doubles |
| ← 1985 · | Virginia Slims of Florida | · 1987 → |

Kathy Jordan and Elizabeth Smylie successfully defended their title, by defeating Betsy Nagelsen and Barbara Potter 7–6, 2–6, 6–2 in the final.

== Seeds ==
1. (United States) Kathy Jordan / (Australia) Elizabeth Smylie (champions)
2. (United States) Betsy Nagelsen / (United States) Barbara Potter (final)
3. (West Germany) Bettina Bunge / (West Germany) Eva Pfaff (semifinals)
4. (Canada) Carling Bassett / (South Africa) Rosalyn Fairbank (semifinals)
5. (United Kingdom) Jo Durie / (United Kingdom) Anne Hobbs (second round)
6. (United States) Alycia Moulton / (France) Catherine Suire (first round)
7. (Bulgaria) Katerina Maleeva / (Bulgaria) Manuela Maleeva (first round)
8. (Sweden) Catarina Lindqvist / (United States) JoAnne Russell (quarterfinals)

== Draw ==
=== Key ===
- Q = Qualifier
- WC = Wild card
- LL = Lucky loser
- Alt = Alternate
- SE = Special exempt
- PR = Protected ranking
- ITF = ITF entry
- JE = Junior exempt
- w/o = Walkover
- r = Retired
- d = Defaulted
- SR = Special ranking

=== Finals ===
Semifinals
1 | (United States) Kathy Jordan (Australia) Elizabeth Smylie | 6 | 6
3 | (West Germany) Bettina Bunge (West Germany) Eva Pfaff | 3 | 2
4 | (Canada) Carling Bassett (South Africa) Rosalyn Fairbank | 4 | 4
2 | (United States) Betsy Nagelsen (United States) Barbara Potter | 6 | 6

Final
1 | (United States) Kathy Jordan (Australia) Elizabeth Smylie | 7 | 2 | 6
2 | (United States) Betsy Nagelsen (United States) Barbara Potter | 6 | 6 | 2

=== Top half ===
First round
1 | (United States) K Jordan (Australia) E Smylie | 6 | 7
(United States) B Gadusek (Argentina) G Sabatini | 4 | 6
(West Germany) S Graf (France) C Tanvier | 6 | 6
(United States) P Casale (United States) B Gerken | 4 | 3
(United States) S Collins (United States) P Louie | 3 | 4
(United States) S Mascarin (United States) T Phelps | 6 | 6
(Argentina) M Paz (United States) K Sands | 7 | 6
7 | (Bulgaria) K Maleeva (Bulgaria) M Maleeva | 5 | 2
3 | (West Germany) B Bunge (West Germany) E Pfaff | 6 | 7
(Peru) L Gildemeister (Argentina) A Villagrán | 1 | 5
(Czechoslovakia) I Budařová (Czechoslovakia) R Maršíková | 6 | 5 | 5
(Italy) S Cecchini (Socialist Federal Republic of Yugoslavia) S Goleš | 3 | 7 | 7
(Australia) D Balestrat (South Africa) Y Vermaak | 4 | 6
(United States) D Farrell (United States) J Goodling | 6 | 7
(Canada) J Hetherington (United States) K Rinaldi | 6 | 3 | 6
6 | (United States) A Moulton (France) C Suire | 4 | 6 | 3

Second round
1 | (United States) K Jordan (Australia) E Smylie | 4 | 6 | 6
(West Germany) S Graf (France) C Tanvier | 6 | 4 | 3
(United States) S Mascarin (United States) T Phelps | 6 | 7 | 4
(Argentina) M Paz (United States) K Sands | 7 | 6 | 6
3 | (West Germany) B Bunge (West Germany) E Pfaff | 6 | 6
(Italy) S Cecchini (Socialist Federal Republic of Yugoslavia) S Goleš | 2 | 2
(United States) D Farrell (United States) J Goodling | 4 | 3
(Canada) J Hetherington (United States) K Rinaldi | 6 | 6

Quarterfinals
1 | (United States) K Jordan (Australia) E Smylie | 6 | 3 | 6
(Argentina) M Paz (United States) K Sands | 1 | 6 | 3
3 | (West Germany) B Bunge (West Germany) E Pfaff | 6 | 6
(Canada) J Hetherington (United States) K Rinaldi | 4 | 4

Semifinals
1 | (United States) K Jordan (Australia) E Smylie | 6 | 6
3 | (West Germany) B Bunge (West Germany) E Pfaff | 3 | 2

=== Bottom half ===
First round
8 | (Sweden) C Lindqvist (United States) JA Russell | 6 | 6
(New Zealand) B Cordwell (Australia) L Field | 1 | 4
(France) I Demongeot (France) N Tauziat | 6 | 6
(Brazil) N Dias (United States) E Raponi Longo | 2 | 0
(Australia) A Minter (South Africa) J Mundel | 6 | 2
(United States) P Barg (Australia) J Tremelling | 7 | 6
(United States) Mary Dailey (United States) J Kaplan | 1 | 1
4 | (Canada) C Bassett (South Africa) R Fairbank | 6 | 6
5 | (United Kingdom) J Durie (United Kingdom) A Hobbs | 2
(United States) J Golder (Greece) A Kanellopoulou | 0^{r}
(Switzerland) L Drescher (Switzerland) C Jolissaint | 2 | 6 | 7
(United States) H Crowe (United States) K Steinmetz | 6 | 4 | 5
(United States) J Klitch (Sweden) M Lindström | 5 | 4
(United Kingdom) A Croft (United States) K Horvath | 7 | 6
(Sweden) K Karlsson (Denmark) T Scheuer-Larsen | 1 | 2
2 | (United States) B Nagelsen (United States) B Potter | 6 | 6

Second round
8 | (Sweden) C Lindqvist (United States) JA Russell | 1 | 7 | 6
(France) I Demongeot (France) N Tauziat | 6 | 5 | 1
(United States) P Barg (Australia) J Tremelling | 4 | 2
4 | (Canada) C Bassett (South Africa) R Fairbank | 6 | 6
5 | (United Kingdom) J Durie (United Kingdom) A Hobbs | 6 | 6 | 2
(Switzerland) L Drescher (Switzerland) C Jolissaint | 7 | 2 | 6
(United Kingdom) A Croft (United States) K Horvath | 4 | 5
2 | (United States) B Nagelsen (United States) B Potter | 6 | 7

Quarterfinals
8 | (Sweden) C Lindqvist (United States) JA Russell | 6 | 3
4 | (Canada) C Bassett (South Africa) R Fairbank | 7 | 6
(Switzerland) L Drescher (Switzerland) C Jolissaint | 3 | 4
2 | (United States) B Nagelsen (United States) B Potter | 6 | 6

Semifinals
4 | (Canada) C Bassett (South Africa) R Fairbank | 4 | 4
2 | (United States) B Nagelsen (United States) B Potter | 6 | 6
