= 1989 Virginia Slims of Florida – Doubles =

Doubles
- 1989 Virginia Slims of Florida
- 1988 Champions: (United States) Katrina Adams (United States) Zina Garrison

Final
- Champions: (Czechoslovakia) Jana Novotná (Czechoslovakia) Helena Suková
- Runners-up: (United Kingdom) Jo Durie (United States) Mary Joe Fernández
- Score: 6–4, 6–2

Details
- Draw: 28
- Seeds: 8

Events
Singles	Doubles
← 1988 ·	Virginia Slims of Florida	· 1990 →

Katrina Adams and Zina Garrison were the defending champions of the doubles event but lost in the quarterfinals of the 1989 Virginia Slims of Florida tennis tournament to Manon Bollegraf and Eva Pfaff.

Jana Novotná and Helena Suková won in the final 6–4, 6–2 against Jo Durie and Mary Joe Fernández.

== Seeds ==
Champion seeds are indicated in bold text while text in italics indicates the round in which those seeds were eliminated. The top four seeded teams received byes into the second round.

1. (United States) Gigi Fernández / (United States) Lori McNeil (quarterfinals)
2. (Czechoslovakia) **Jana Novotná** / (Czechoslovakia) **Helena Suková (champions)**
3. (United States) Katrina Adams / (United States) Zina Garrison (quarterfinals)
4. (Australia) Elizabeth Smylie / (Australia) Wendy Turnbull (semifinals)
5. (Australia) Jenny Byrne / (United States) Betsy Nagelsen (first round)
6. (France) Isabelle Demongeot / (France) Nathalie Tauziat (second round)
7. (Netherlands) Manon Bollegraf / (West Germany) Eva Pfaff (semifinals)
8. (Argentina) Mercedes Paz / (Denmark) Tine Scheuer-Larsen (quarterfinals)

== Draw ==
=== Key ===
- Q = Qualifier
- WC = Wild card
- LL = Lucky loser
- Alt = Alternate
- SE = Special exempt
- PR = Protected ranking
- ITF = ITF entry
- JE = Junior exempt
- w/o = Walkover
- r = Retired
- d = Defaulted
- SR = Special ranking

=== Final ===
Final

- (United Kingdom) Jo Durie
- (United States) Mary Joe Fernández
4
2

2
- (Czechoslovakia) **Jana Novotná**
- (Czechoslovakia) **Helena Suková**
**6**
**6**

=== Top half ===
First round

Second round

Quarterfinals

Semifinals

1
- (United States) **G Fernández**
- (United States) **L McNeil**
**6**
5
**7**

- (South Africa) R Fairbank
- (United States) K Rinaldi
2
3

- (United States) P Barg
- (United States) R Reis
2
**7**
6

- (United States) **P Barg**
- (United States) **R Reis**
**6**
**6**

1
- (United States) G Fernández
- (United States) L McNeil
4
1

- (United Kingdom) **J Durie**
- (United States) **M J Fernández**
**7**
**6**

- (United Kingdom) **J Durie**
- (United States) **M J Fernández**
**6**
**6**

- (United States) A Grossman
- (United States) S Sloane
5
0

- (United Kingdom) **J Durie**
- (United States) **M J Fernández**
4
**6**
**7**

- (Netherlands) N Jagerman
- (Poland) I Kuczyńska
1
2

6
- (France) I Demongeot
- (France) N Tauziat
**6**
2
6

6
- (France) **I Demongeot**
- (France) **N Tauziat**
**6**
**6**

- (United Kingdom) **J Durie**
- (United States) **M J Fernández**
**6**
**6**

4
- (Australia) E Smylie
- (Australia) W Turnbull
4
1

4
- (Australia) **E Smylie**
- (Australia) **W Turnbull**
**6**
**6**

- (United States) **T Phelps**
- (Italy) **R Reggi**
1
**7**
**6**

- (United States) T Phelps
- (Italy) R Reggi
2
3

- (Australia) A Minter
- (France) C Suire
**6**
5
4

4
- (Australia) **E Smylie**
- (Australia) **W Turnbull**
**6**
**6**

- (West Germany) **S Hanika**
- (West Germany) **C Porwik**
**6**
**6**

8
- (Argentina) M Paz
- (Denmark) T Scheuer-Larsen
3
3

- (Argentina) B Fulco
- (Argentina) A Villagrán
3
0

- (West Germany) S Hanika
- (West Germany) C Porwik
1
**7**
1

- (Australia) D Balestrat
- (United States) H Na
6
1

8
- (Argentina) **M Paz**
- (Denmark) **T Scheuer-Larsen**
**6**
5
**6**

8
- (Argentina) **M Paz**
- (Denmark) **T Scheuer-Larsen**
**7**
**6**

=== Bottom half ===
First round

Second round

Quarterfinals

Semifinals

7
- (Netherlands) **M Bollegraf**
- (West Germany) **E Pfaff**
**6**
**6**

- (United States) K Horvath
- (United States) A Leand
2
4

7
- (Netherlands) **M Bollegraf**
- (West Germany) **E Pfaff**
**6**
**6**

- (Brazil) N Dias
- (Italy) L Ferrando
2
**6**
4

(Socialist Federal Republic of Yugoslavia) S Goleš
(Argentina) P Tarabini
1
4

(Socialist Federal Republic of Yugoslavia) **S Goleš**
(Argentina) **P Tarabini**
**6**
3
**6**

7
- (Netherlands) **M Bollegraf**
- (West Germany) **E Pfaff**
**6**
3
**6**

- (France) A Dechaume
- (France) N Herreman
4
**6**
2

3
- (United States) K Adams
- (United States) Z Garrison
3
**6**
1

- (Canada) **H Kelesi**
- (United States) **S Stafford**
**6**
1
**6**

- (Canada) H Kelesi
- (United States) S Stafford
4
1

3
- (United States) **K Adams**
- (United States) **Z Garrison**
**6**
**6**

7
- (Netherlands) M Bollegraf
- (West Germany) E Pfaff
3
4

5
- (Australia) J Byrne
- (United States) B Nagelsen
3
4

2
- (Czechoslovakia) **J Novotná**
- (Czechoslovakia) **H Suková**
**6**
**6**

- (Australia) **J-A Faull**
- (Netherlands) **H Witvoet**
**6**
**6**

- (Australia) J-A Faull
- (Netherlands) H Witvoet
3
**6**
6

- (Italy) S Cecchini
- (Spain) A Sánchez
2
0

- (Australia) **N Provis**
- (South Africa) **E Reinach**
**6**
4
**7**

- (Australia) **N Provis**
- (South Africa) **E Reinach**
**6**
**6**

- (Australia) N Provis
- (South Africa) E Reinach
0
4

- (South Africa) L Barnard
- (South Africa) L Gregory
5
4

2
- (Czechoslovakia) **J Novotná**
- (Czechoslovakia) **H Suková**
**6**
**6**

- (New Zealand) **B Cordwell**
- (South Africa) **D Van Rensburg**
**7**
**6**

- (New Zealand) B Cordwell
- (South Africa) D Van Rensburg
0
4

2
- (Czechoslovakia) **J Novotná**
- (Czechoslovakia) **H Suková**
**6**
**6**
