= 1986 Virginia Slims of Florida =

- Date: January 27 – February 2
- Edition: 8th
- Draw: 56S / 32D
- Prize money: $250,000
- Surface: Hard / outdoors
- Location: Key Biscayne, Florida, U.S.

Champions

Singles
- (United States) Chris Evert-Lloyd

Doubles
- (United States) Kathy Jordan / (Australia) Elizabeth Smylie
← 1985 ·	Virginia Slims of Florida	· 1987 →

The 1986 Virginia Slims of Florida, also known as the VS of Florida, was a women's tennis tournament played on outdoor hard courts in Key Biscayne, Florida in the United States that was part of the 1985 Virginia Slims World Championship Series. (Note: The 1985 Virginia Slims World Championship Series ran from March 1985 through March 1986.) It was the eighth edition of the tournament and was held from January 27 through February 2, 1986. First-seeded Chris Evert-Lloyd won the singles title, her third consecutive at the event.

== Finals ==
=== Singles ===
(United States) Chris Evert Lloyd defeated (West Germany) Steffi Graf 6–3, 6–1

- It was Evert-Lloyd's 1st singles title of the year and the 143rd of her career.

=== Doubles ===
(United States) Kathy Jordan / (Australia) Elizabeth Smylie defeated (United States) Betsy Nagelsen / (United States) Barbara Potter 7–6, 2–6, 6–2
