= 1988 Virginia Slims of Florida – Doubles =

Doubles
- 1988 Virginia Slims of Florida
- 1987 Champions: (Soviet Union) Svetlana Parkhomenko (Soviet Union) Larisa Savchenko

Final
- Champions: (United States) Katrina Adams (United States) Zina Garrison
- Runners-up: (West Germany) Claudia Kohde-Kilsch (Czechoslovakia) Helena Suková
- Score: 4–6, 7–5, 6–4

Events
Singles	Doubles
← 1987 ·	Virginia Slims of Florida	· 1989 →

Svetlana Parkhomenko and Larisa Savchenko were the defending champions but did not compete that year.

Katrina Adams and Zina Garrison won in the final 4–6, 7–5, 6–4 against Claudia Kohde-Kilsch and Helena Suková.

== Seeds ==
Champion seeds are indicated in bold text while text in italics indicates the round in which those seeds were eliminated. The top four seeded teams received byes into the second round.

1. (West Germany) Claudia Kohde-Kilsch / (Czechoslovakia) Helena Suková (final)
2. (United States) Betsy Nagelsen / (United States) Pam Shriver (semifinals)
3. (Australia) Hana Mandlíková / (Czechoslovakia) Jana Novotná (second round)
4. (United States) Chris Evert / (Australia) Wendy Turnbull (second round)
5. (Sweden) Catarina Lindqvist / (Denmark) Tine Scheuer-Larsen (quarterfinals)
6. (France) Catherine Suire / (France) Catherine Tanvier (second round)
7. (United Kingdom) Jo Durie / (United States) Sharon Walsh-Pete (quarterfinals)
8. (United States) Peanut Harper / (United States) Heather Ludloff (first round)

== Draw ==
=== Key ===
- Q = Qualifier
- WC = Wild card
- LL = Lucky loser
- Alt = Alternate
- SE = Special exempt
- PR = Protected ranking
- ITF = ITF entry
- JE = Junior exempt
- w/o = Walkover
- r = Retired
- d = Defaulted
- SR = Special ranking

=== Final ===
Final

1
- (West Germany) Claudia Kohde-Kilsch
- (Czechoslovakia) Helena Suková
**6**
5
4

- (United States) **Katrina Adams**
- (United States) **Zina Garrison**
4
**7**
**6**

=== Top half ===
First round

Second round

Quarterfinals

Semifinals

1
- (West Germany) **C Kohde-Kilsch**
- (Czechoslovakia) **H Suková**
**6**
**7**

- (Australia) **N Provis**
- (South Africa) **E Reinach**
**6**
2
**6**

- (Australia) N Provis
- (South Africa) E Reinach
3
5

- (New Zealand) B Cordwell
- (New Zealand) J Richardson
2
**6**
1

1
- (West Germany) **C Kohde-Kilsch**
- (Czechoslovakia) **H Suková**
**7**
**7**

- (Netherlands) **M Bollegraf**
- (Netherlands) **M van der Torre**
**7**
5
**7**

- (Netherlands) M Bollegraf
- (Netherlands) M van der Torre
5
5

- (Australia) L Field
- (Netherlands) H Witvoet
6
**7**
6

- (Netherlands) **M Bollegraf**
- (Netherlands) **M van der Torre**
**7**
2
**6**

- (United States) **P Barg**
- (United States) **A M Fernandez**
**7**
4
**6**

- (United States) P Barg
- (United States) A M Fernandez
6
**6**
1

8
- (United States) P Harper
- (United States) H Ludloff
5
**6**
1

1
- (West Germany) **C Kohde-Kilsch**
- (Czechoslovakia) **H Suková**
**7**
**6**

- (United States) P Fendick
- (Canada) J Hetherington
5
4

4
- (United States) C Evert
- (Australia) W Turnbull
4
2

(Italy) S Cecchini
(Socialist Federal Republic of Yugoslavia) S Goleš
**6**
4
5

- (Hong Kong) **P Hy**
- (South Africa) **D Van Rensburg**
**6**
**6**

- (Hong Kong) **P Hy**
- (South Africa) **D Van Rensburg**
1
**6**
**7**

- (Hong Kong) P Hy
- (South Africa) D Van Rensburg
2
3

- (United States) **P Fendick**
- (Canada) **J Hetherington**
**6**
**6**

- (United States) **P Fendick**
- (Canada) **J Hetherington**
**6**
**6**

- (Sweden) M Lindström
- (West Germany) C Porwik
1
1

- (United States) **P Fendick**
- (Canada) **J Hetherington**
**6**
**7**

- (France) I Demongeot
- (France) N Tauziat
3
3

6
- (France) C Suire
- (France) C Tanvier
3
6

6
- (France) **C Suire**
- (France) **C Tanvier**
**6**
**6**

=== Bottom half ===
First round

Second round

Quarterfinals

Semifinals

7
- (United Kingdom) **J Durie**
- (United States) **S Walsh-Pete**
**6**
**7**

- (Australia) D Balestrat
- (Australia) A Minter
1
6

7
- (United Kingdom) **J Durie**
- (United States) **S Walsh-Pete**
**7**
**6**

- (Argentina) G Mosca
- (Argentina) A Villagrán
4
1

- (United States) K Horvath
- (Netherlands) B Schultz
6
2

- (United States) **K Horvath**
- (Netherlands) **B Schultz**
**6**
**6**

7
- (United Kingdom) J Durie
- (United States) S Walsh-Pete
2
**6**
4

- (France) N Herreman
- (France) P Paradis
**6**
2
4

- (United States) **K Adams**
- (United States) **Z Garrison**
**6**
4
**6**

- (United States) **K Adams**
- (United States) **Z Garrison**
4
**6**
**6**

- (United States) **K Adams**
- (United States) **Z Garrison**
**7**
**6**

3
- (Australia) H Mandlíková
- (Czechoslovakia) J Novotná
5
1

- (United States) **K Adams**
- (United States) **Z Garrison**
**6**
**6**

5
- (Sweden) **C Lindqvist**
- (Denmark) **T Scheuer-Larsen**
**6**
**6**

2
- (United States) B Nagelsen
- (United States) P Shriver
2
0

- (Canada) H Kelesi
- (Italy) R Reggi
3
2

5
- (Sweden) **C Lindqvist**
- (Denmark) **T Scheuer-Larsen**
**6**
**6**

- (United States) E Hakami
- (West Germany) C Singer
0
2

- (United States) M J Fernández
- (United States) T Phelps
0
3

- (United States) **M J Fernández**
- (United States) **T Phelps**
**6**
**6**

5
- (Sweden) C Lindqvist
- (Denmark) T Scheuer-Larsen
1
5

- (West Germany) A Betzner
- (Argentina) P Tarabini
**6**
2
3

2
- (United States) **B Nagelsen**
- (United States) **P Shriver**
**6**
**7**

- (South Africa) **R Fairbank**
- (United States) **S Rehe**
4
**6**
**6**

- (South Africa) R Fairbank
- (United States) S Rehe
**7**
5
2

2
- (United States) **B Nagelsen**
- (United States) **P Shriver**
6
**7**
**6**
