= 1984 Virginia Slims of Florida =

- Date: 12–18 March
- Edition: 1st
- Category: Category 3
- Draw: 56S / 32D
- Prize money: $150,000
- Surface: Clay / outdoor
- Location: Palm Beach Gardens, Florida, U.S.

Champions

Singles
- (United States) Chris Evert-Lloyd

Doubles
- (United States) Betsy Nagelsen / (United States) Anne White
| Virginia Slims of Florida | · 1985 → |

The 1984 Virginia Slims of Florida was a women's tennis tournament played on outdoor clay courts in Palm Beach Gardens, Florida in the United States that was part of the Category 3 tier of the 1984 Virginia Slims World Championship Series. It was the inaugural edition of the tournament, held from 12 March through 18 March 1984. First-seeded Chris Evert-Lloyd won the singles title.

== Finals ==
=== Singles ===
(United States) Chris Evert-Lloyd defeated (United States) Bonnie Gadusek 6–0, 6–1

- It was Evert-Lloyd's first singles title of 1984 and the 127th of her career.

=== Doubles ===
(United States) Betsy Nagelsen / (United States) Anne White defeated (South Africa) Rosalyn Fairbank / (United States) Candy Reynolds 2–6, 6–2, 6–2

- It was Nagelsen's first title of 1984 and the twelfth of her career. It was White's second title of 1984 and the second of her career.
