= 1988 Virginia Slims of Florida – Singles =

Singles
- 1988 Virginia Slims of Florida
- 1987 Champion: (West Germany) Steffi Graf

Final
- Champion: (Argentina) Gabriela Sabatini
- Runner-up: (West Germany) Steffi Graf
- Score: 2–6, 6–3, 6–1

Events
Singles	Doubles
← 1987 ·	Virginia Slims of Florida	· 1989 →

Steffi Graf was the defending champion but lost in the final 2–6, 6–3, 6–1 against Gabriela Sabatini.

== Seeds ==
A champion seed is indicated in bold text while text in italics indicates the round in which that seed was eliminated. The top eight seeds received a bye to the second round.

1. (West Germany) Steffi Graf (final)
2. (United States) Chris Evert (semifinals)
3. (United States) Pam Shriver (semifinals)
4. (Argentina) **Gabriela Sabatini (champion)**
5. (Czechoslovakia) Helena Suková (third round)
6. (West Germany) Claudia Kohde-Kilsch (second round)
7. (Italy) Sandra Cecchini (quarterfinals)
8. (Italy) Raffaella Reggi (third round)
9. (France) Nathalie Tauziat (third round)
10. (Sweden) Catarina Lindqvist (first round)
11. (United States) Mary Joe Fernández (quarterfinals)
12. n/a
13. (Australia) Anne Minter (first round)
14. (United States) Stephanie Rehe (first round)
15. n/a
16. n/a

== Draw ==
=== Key ===
- Q = Qualifier
- WC = Wild card
- LL = Lucky loser
- Alt = Alternate
- SE = Special exempt
- PR = Protected ranking
- ITF = ITF entry
- JE = Junior exempt
- w/o = Walkover
- r = Retired
- d = Defaulted
- SR = Special ranking

=== Finals ===
Semifinals
1	(West Germany) **Steffi Graf**	**6**	4	**7**
3	(United States) Pam Shriver	4	**6**	6
4	(Argentina) **Gabriela Sabatini**	**6**	**7**
2	(United States) Chris Evert	1	5

Final
1	(West Germany) Steffi Graf	**6**	3	1
4	(Argentina) **Gabriela Sabatini**	2	**6**	**6**

=== Top half ===
==== Section 1 ====
First round
Q	(United States) P Casale	4	3
(United States) **L Bonder**	**6**	**6**
(Netherlands) **B Schultz**	**7**	**6**
(West Germany) S Meier	6	1
(United States) M Werdel	4	2
9	(France) **N Tauziat**	**6**	**6**
LL	(Denmark) T Scheuer-Larsen	3	5
(France) **P Paradis**	**6**	**7**
(West Germany) C Porwik	4	1
(Socialist Federal Republic of Yugoslavia) **S Goleš**	**6**	**6**
(United States) E Hakami	**6**	3	1
Q	(Italy) **L Golarsa**	1	**6**	**6**

Second round
1	(West Germany) **S Graf**	**6**	**6**
(United States) L Bonder	1	1
(Netherlands) B Schultz	2	2
9	(France) **N Tauziat**	**6**	**6**
(France) **P Paradis**	**6**	**6**
(Socialist Federal Republic of Yugoslavia) S Goleš	2	4
Q	(Italy) L Golarsa	3	3
8	(Italy) **R Reggi**	**6**	**6**

Third round
1	(West Germany) **S Graf**	**6**	**6**
9	(France) N Tauziat	2	1
(France) **P Paradis**	3	**6**	**6**
8	(Italy) R Reggi	**6**	4	2

Quarterfinals
1	(West Germany) **S Graf**	**6**	**6**
(France) P Paradis	1	2

==== Section 2 ====
First round
Q	(West Germany) **W Probst**	**7**	3	**6**
(United States) B Nagelsen	5	**6**	3
(Austria) P Huber	1	2
(Australia) **N Provis**	**6**	**6**
(Argentina) **B Fulco**	**6**	5	**6**
14	(United States) S Rehe	4	**7**	4
(United States) **R White**	**7**	**6**
(United Kingdom) J Durie	6	2
(South Africa) **R Fairbank**	**6**	**6**
(United States) K Keil	2	2
(United States) T Phelps	4	5
(United States) **G Fernández**	**6**	**7**

Second round
3	(United States) **P Shriver**	**6**	**6**
Q	(West Germany) W Probst	1	1
(Australia) **N Provis**	**6**	**7**
(Argentina) B Fulco	4	6
(United States) **R White**	4	**6**	**6**
(South Africa) R Fairbank	**6**	4	3
(United States) **G Fernández**	**7**	5	**6**
6	(West Germany) C Kohde-Kilsch	5	**7**	4

Third round
3	(United States) **P Shriver**	**6**	**6**
(Australia) N Provis	4	0
(United States) R White	5	**7**	1
(United States) **G Fernández**	**7**	6	**6**

Quarterfinals
3	(United States) **P Shriver**	1	**7**	**7**
(United States) G Fernández	**6**	5	5

=== Bottom half ===
==== Section 3 ====
First round
(Argentina) **P Tarabini**	**6**	**6**
Q	(Switzerland) C Jolissaint	3	3
(New Zealand) B Cordwell	4	2
(United States) **M Torres**	**6**	**6**
(France) I Demongeot	5	2
11	(United States) **M J Fernández**	**7**	**6**
10	(Sweden) C Lindqvist	4	3
Q	(Italy) **L Ferrando**	**6**	**6**
(Canada) J Hetherington	4	**6**	2
Q	(South Africa) **K Schimper**	**6**	3	**6**
(Australia) **W Turnbull**	3	**6**	**6**
LL	(Belgium) A Devries	**6**	2	2

Second round
5	(Czechoslovakia) **H Suková**	**6**	**6**
(Argentina) P Tarabini	2	1
(United States) M Torres	1	2
11	(United States) **M J Fernández**	**6**	**6**
Q	(Italy) L Ferrando	3	**6**	5
Q	(South Africa) **K Schimper**	**6**	4	**7**
(Australia) W Turnbull	1	1
4	(Argentina) **G Sabatini**	**6**	**6**

Third round
5	(Czechoslovakia) H Suková	4	**6**	2
11	(United States) **M J Fernández**	**6**	1	**6**
Q	(South Africa) K Schimper	2	1
4	(Argentina) **G Sabatini**	**6**	**6**

Quarterfinals
11	(United States) M J Fernández	6	3
4	(Argentina) **G Sabatini**	**7**	**6**

==== Section 4 ====
First round
(United States) H Cioffi	**6**	4	0
(Japan) **A Kijimuta**	3	**6**	**6**
(Italy) L Garrone	2	**6**	4
Q	(South Africa) **E Reinach**	**6**	1	**6**
(Brazil) **N Dias**	**6**	2	**6**
(Japan) E Inoue	4	**6**	0
13	(Australia) A Minter	2	0
Q	(United States) **P Harper**	**6**	**6**
(United States) **K Horvath**	**6**	**6**
(Czechoslovakia) R Zrubáková	4	3
(Socialist Federal Republic of Yugoslavia) **M Seles**	**7**	**6**
(Canada) H Kelesi	6	3

Second round
7	(Italy) **S Cecchini**	**7**	**6**
(Japan) A Kijimuta	5	2
Q	(South Africa) **E Reinach**	4	**6**	**6**
(Brazil) N Dias	**6**	1	3
Q	(United States) **P Harper**	**6**	**7**
(United States) K Horvath	4	5
(Socialist Federal Republic of Yugoslavia) M Seles	2	1
2	(United States) **C Evert**	**6**	**6**

Third round
7	(Italy) **S Cecchini**	4	**6**	**6**
Q	(South Africa) E Reinach	**6**	4	2
Q	(United States) P Harper	1	3
2	(United States) **C Evert**	**6**	**6**

Quarterfinals
7	(Italy) S Cecchini	1	0
2	(United States) **C Evert**	**6**	**6**
