= 1990 Virginia Slims of Florida – Singles =

Singles
- 1990 Virginia Slims of Florida

Final
- Champion: (Argentina) Gabriela Sabatini
- Runner-up: (United States) Jennifer Capriati
- Score: 6–4, 7–5

Details
- Draw: 56 (8Q/2LL)
- Seeds: 16

Events
Singles	Doubles
← 1989 ·	Virginia Slims of Florida	· 1991 →

Steffi Graf was the defending champion, but did not compete this year.

Gabriela Sabatini won the title, by defeating Jennifer Capriati 6–4, 7–5 in the final.

== Seeds ==
The top eight seeds received a bye to the second round.

1. (Argentina) Gabriela Sabatini (champion)
2. (Socialist Federal Republic of Yugoslavia) Monica Seles (third round)
3. (United States) Mary Joe Fernández (semifinals, retired)
4. (Czechoslovakia) Helena Suková (quarterfinals)
5. (Czechoslovakia) Jana Novotná (quarterfinals)
6. (Australia) Hana Mandlíková (third round)
7. (United States) Pam Shriver (third round)
8. (France) Nathalie Tauziat (third round)
9. (Italy) Raffaella Reggi (third round)
10. (Peru) Laura Gildemeister (semifinals)
11. (n/a)
12. (Austria) Judith Wiesner (third round)
13. (Czechoslovakia) Radka Zrubáková (first round)
14. (United States) Susan Sloane (first round)
15. (West Germany) Claudia Porwik (second round)
16. (West Germany) Sylvia Hanika (second round)

== Draw ==
=== Key ===
- Q = Qualifier
- WC = Wild card
- LL = Lucky loser
- Alt = Alternate
- SE = Special exempt
- PR = Protected ranking
- ITF = ITF entry
- JE = Junior exempt
- w/o = Walkover
- r = Retired
- d = Defaulted
- SR = Special ranking

=== Finals ===
Quarterfinals
1	(Argentina) Gabriela Sabatini	6	7
(South Africa) Dianne Van Rensburg	2	6
3	(United States) Mary Joe Fernández	6	6
(South Africa) Amanda Coetzer	0	1
(United States) Jennifer Capriati	6	6
4	(Czechoslovakia) Helena Suková	1	4
5	(Czechoslovakia) Jana Novotná	6	3	3
10	(Peru) Laura Gildemeister	3	6	6

Semifinals
1	(Argentina) Gabriela Sabatini	4
3	(United States) Mary Joe Fernández	4	r
(United States) Jennifer Capriati	7	7
10	(Peru) Laura Gildemeister	6	6

Final
1	(Argentina) Gabriela Sabatini	6	7
(United States) Jennifer Capriati	4	5

=== Top half ===
==== Section 1 ====
First round
(Czechoslovakia) J Pospíšilová	2	0
(Japan) E Inoue	6	6
(Sweden) M Strandlund	2	0
(France) J Halard	6	6
(Belgium) S Wasserman	6	4
9	(Italy) R Reggi	7	6
13	(Czechoslovakia) R Zrubáková	6	4	4
Q	(France) N Guerrée-Spitzer	4	6	6
(South Africa) D Van Rensburg	6	6
(West Germany) W Probst	1	3
(South Africa) E Reinach	3	1
Q	(United Kingdom) S Loosemore	6	6

Second round
1	(Argentina) G Sabatini	6	7
(Japan) E Inoue	2	5
(France) J Halard	2	7	2
9	(Italy) R Reggi	6	5	6
Q	(France) N Guerrée-Spitzer	5	6
(South Africa) D Van Rensburg	7	7
Q	(United Kingdom) S Loosemore	3	0
7	(United States) P Shriver	6	6

Third round
1	(Argentina) G Sabatini	6	6
9	(Italy) R Reggi	2	1
(South Africa) D Van Rensburg	7	6
7	(United States) P Shriver	5	1

Quarterfinals
1	(Argentina) G Sabatini	6	7
(South Africa) D Van Rensburg	2	6

==== Section 2 ====
First round
(Australia) N Provis	6	6
(France) I Demongeot	4	3
(France) K Quentrec	5	3
(Argentina) B Fulco	7	6
(United States) T Phelps	1	4
12	(Austria) J Wiesner	6	6
16	(West Germany) S Hanika	6	6
Q	(United States) E deLone	4	1
Q	(United States) L Allen	5	3
(South Africa) A Coetzer	7	6
LL	(West Germany) E Pfaff	2	4
LL	(France) N Herreman	6	6

Second round
3	(United States) MJ Fernández	6	4	7
(Australia) N Provis	2	6	6
(Argentina) B Fulco	5	2
12	(Austria) J Wiesner	7	6
16	(West Germany) S Hanika	1	6	2
(South Africa) A Coetzer	6	2	6
LL	(France) N Herreman	3	0
6	(Australia) H Mandlíková	6	6

Third round
3	(United States) MJ Fernández	6	6
12	(Austria) J Wiesner	4	1
(South Africa) A Coetzer	2	6	6
6	(Australia) H Mandlíková	6	2	3

Quarterfinals
3	(United States) MJ Fernández	6	6
(South Africa) A Coetzer	0	1

=== Bottom half ===
==== Section 3 ====
First round
(United States) S Martin	6	6
(Argentina) F Labat	1	4
Q	(United States) ML Daniels	6	1
(United States) J Capriati	7	6
(United States) E Burgin	1	6	2
15	(West Germany) C Porwik	6	4	6
(United States) A Smith	4	6	7
(Italy) L Golarsa	6	3	6
(Japan) N Miyagi	3	3
(United States) H Cioffi	6	6
Q	(Canada) R Simpson	6	6
Q	(Peru) P Vásquez	1	4

Second round
8	(France) N Tauziat	6	6
(United States) S Martin	2	1
(United States) J Capriati	7	0	6
15	(West Germany) C Porwik	5	6	2
(United States) A Smith	6	3	6
(United States) H Cioffi	2	6	7
Q	(Canada) R Simpson	1	3
4	(Czechoslovakia) H Suková	6	6

Third round
8	(France) N Tauziat	4	2
(United States) J Capriati	6	6
(United States) H Cioffi	4	6	1
4	(Czechoslovakia) H Suková	6	4	6

Quarterfinals
(United States) J Capriati	6	6
4	(Czechoslovakia) H Suková	1	4

==== Section 4 ====
First round
(West Germany) S Hack	1	7	2
Q	(United States) T Whitlinger	6	5	6
(West Germany) A Huber	4	0
(Mexico) A Gavaldón	6	6
(United States) P Louie Harper	2	6	6
14	(United States) S Sloane	6	2	0
10	(Peru) L Gildemeister	6	7
(Japan) A Kijimuta	1	6
(New Zealand) B Cordwell	3	3
(United States) A Grossman	6	6
(Netherlands) N Jagerman	6	6
(United States) S Stafford	4	3

Second round
5	(Czechoslovakia) J Novotná	6	6
Q	(United States) T Whitlinger	0	3
(Mexico) A Gavaldón	7	4	6
(United States) P Louie Harper	6	6	2
10	(Peru) L Gildemeister	6	3	6
(United States) A Grossman	2	6	2
(Netherlands) N Jagerman	2	0
2	(Socialist Federal Republic of Yugoslavia) M Seles	6	6

Third round
5	(Czechoslovakia) J Novotná	6	6
(Mexico) A Gavaldón	1	0
10	(Peru) L Gildemeister	6	7
2	(Socialist Federal Republic of Yugoslavia) M Seles	1	5

Quarterfinals
5	(Czechoslovakia) J Novotná	6	3	3
10	(Peru) L Gildemeister	3	6	6
