= 1990 Virginia Slims of Florida =

- Date: March 5–11
- Edition: 12th
- Category: Tier II
- Draw: 56S / 28D
- Prize money: $350,000
- Surface: Hard / outdoor
- Location: Boca Raton, Florida, U.S.
- Venue: Boca Raton Resort & Club

Champions

Singles
- (Argentina) Gabriela Sabatini

Doubles
- (Czechoslovakia) Jana Novotná / (Czechoslovakia) Helena Suková
← 1989 ·	Virginia Slims of Florida	· 1991 →

The 1990 Virginia Slims of Florida was a women's tennis tournament played on outdoor hard courts at the Boca Raton Resort & Club in Boca Raton, Florida in the United States and was part of the Tier II category of the 1990 WTA Tour. It was the 12th edition of the tournament and ran from March 5 through March 11, 1990. First-seeded Gabriela Sabatini won the singles title.

== Finals ==
=== Singles ===
(Argentina) Gabriela Sabatini defeated (United States) Jennifer Capriati 6–4, 7–5

- It was Sabatini's 1st singles title of the year and the 14th of her career.

=== Doubles ===
(Czechoslovakia) Jana Novotná / (Czechoslovakia) Helena Suková defeated (United States) Elise Burgin / (Australia) Wendy Turnbull 6–4, 6–2

- It was Novotná's 5th doubles title of the year and the 19th of her career. It was Suková's 5th doubles title of the year and the 36th of her career.
