= 1989 Virginia Slims of Florida =

- Date: March 13–19
- Edition: 11th
- Category: Category 5
- Draw: 56S / 28D
- Prize money: $300,000
- Surface: Hard / outdoor
- Location: Boca Raton, Florida, U.S.
- Venue: The Polo Club of Boca Raton

Champions

Singles
- (West Germany) Steffi Graf

Doubles
- (Czechoslovakia) Jana Novotná / (Czechoslovakia) Helena Suková
← 1988 ·	Virginia Slims of Florida	· 1990 →

The 1989 Virginia Slims of Florida was a women's tennis tournament played on outdoor hard courts at the Polo Club of Boca Raton in Boca Raton, Florida in the United States and was part of the Category 5 tier of the 1989 WTA Tour. The tournament ran from March 13 through March 19, 1989. First-seeded Steffi Graf won the singles title, her second at the event after 1987.

== Finals ==
=== Singles ===
(West Germany) Steffi Graf defeated (United States) Chris Evert 4–6, 6–2, 6–3

- It was Graf's 4th singles title of the year and the 34th of her career.

=== Doubles ===
(Czechoslovakia) Jana Novotná / (Czechoslovakia) Helena Suková defeated (United Kingdom) Jo Durie / (United States) Mary Joe Fernández 6–4, 6–2

- It was Novotná's 3rd title of the year and the 15th of her career. It was Suková's 3rd title of the year and the 35th of her career.
