= 1991 Virginia Slims of Florida =

- Date: March 4–10
- Edition: 13th
- Category: Tier I
- Draw: 56S / 28D
- Prize money: $500,000
- Surface: Hard / outdoor
- Location: Boca Raton, Florida, U.S.
- Venue: The Polo Club

Champions

Singles
- (Argentina) Gabriela Sabatini

Doubles
- (Soviet Union) Larisa Neiland / (Soviet Union) Natasha Zvereva
← 1990 ·	Virginia Slims of Florida	· 1992 →

The 1991 Virginia Slims of Florida was a women's tennis tournament played on outdoor hard courts in Boca Raton, Florida in the United States that was part of Tier I of the 1991 WTA Tour. It was the 13th edition of the tournament and was held from March 4 through March 10, 1991. Second seeded Gabriela Sabatini won the singles title, her second consecutive at the event and third in total.

== Finals ==
=== Singles ===
(Argentina) Gabriela Sabatini defeated (Germany) Steffi Graf 6–4, 7–6^{(8–6)}

- It was Sabatini's 2nd singles title of the year and the 17th of her career.

=== Doubles ===
(Soviet Union) Larisa Neiland / (Soviet Union) Natasha Zvereva defeated (United States) Meredith McGrath / (United States) Anne Smith 6–4, 7–6^{(7–3)}

- It was Neiland's 2nd title of the year and the 20th of her career. It was Zvereva's 3rd title of the year and the 14th of her career.

== Entrants ==
=== Seeds ===
Country	Player	Rank	Seed
GER	Steffi Graf	1	1
ARG	Gabriela Sabatini	4	2
USA	Mary Joe Fernández	5	3
USA	Jennifer Capriati	11	4
ESP	Conchita Martínez	10	5
AUT	Barbara Paulus	16	6
Soviet Union	Natasha Zvereva	14	7
FRA	Nathalie Tauziat	17	8
CAN	Helen Kelesi	18	9
ITA	Sandra Cecchini	21	10
USA	Anne Smith	22	11
USA	Laura Arraya	24	12
RSA	Rosalyn Fairbank	25	13
GER	Anke Huber	23	14
USA	Meredith McGrath	38	16

=== Other entrants ===
The following players received wildcards into the singles main draw:

- (United States) Ann Grossman
- (Germany) Barbara Rittner

The following players received entry from the qualifying draw:

- (United States) Halle Cioffi
- (France) Catherine Suire
- (United States) Shaun Stafford
- (United States) Julie Shiflet
- (Argentina) Bettina Fulco
- (United Kingdom) Samantha Smith
- (United States) Michelle Jackson-Nobrega
- (United States) Louise Allen
