= 1988 Virginia Slims of Florida =

- Date: March 7 – 13
- Edition: 10th
- Category: Tier II
- Draw: 56S / 28D
- Prize money: $300,000
- Surface: Hard / outdoor
- Location: Boca Raton, Florida, U.S.
- Venue: Boca Raton Resort & Club

Champions

Singles
- (Argentina) Gabriela Sabatini

Doubles
- (United States) Katrina Adams / (United States) Zina Garrison
← 1987 ·	Virginia Slims of Florida	· 1989 →

The 1988 Virginia Slims of Florida was a women's tennis tournament played on outdoor hard courts at the Boca Raton Resort & Club in Boca Raton, Florida in the United States and was part of Tier II of the 1988 WTA Tour. The tournament ran from March 7 through March 13, 1988. Fourth-seeded Gabriela Sabatini won the singles title and earned $60,000 first-prize money, ending a 30-match winning streak by Steffi Graf. It was Sabatini's first win over Graf after 11 previous defeats.

== Finals ==
=== Singles ===
(Argentina) Gabriela Sabatini defeated (West Germany) Steffi Graf 2–6, 6–3, 6–1

- It was Sabatini's 1st singles title of the year and the 6th of her career.

=== Doubles ===
(United States) Katrina Adams / (United States) Zina Garrison defeated (West Germany) Claudia Kohde-Kilsch / (Czechoslovakia) Helena Suková 4–6, 7–5, 6–4

- It was Adams' 1st title of the year and the 2nd of her career. It was Garrison's 1st title of the year and the 12th of her career.
