= 1991 Virginia Slims of Florida – Singles =

Singles
- 1991 Virginia Slims of Florida

Final
- Champion: (Argentina) Gabriela Sabatini
- Runner-up: (Germany) Steffi Graf
- Score: 6–4, 7–6^{(8–6)}

Details
- Draw: 56
- Seeds: 16

Events
Singles	Doubles
← 1990 ·	Virginia Slims of Florida	· 1992 →

Defending champion Gabriela Sabatini defeated Steffi Graf in the final, 6–4, 7–6^{(8–6)} to win the singles tennis title at the 1991 Virginia Slims of Florida.

== Seeds ==
The top eight seeds received a bye to the second round.

1. (West Germany) Steffi Graf (final)
2. (Argentina) Gabriela Sabatini (champion)
3. (United States) Mary Joe Fernández (quarterfinal)
4. (United States) Jennifer Capriati (semifinal)
5. (Spain) Conchita Martínez (second round)
6. (Austria) Barbara Paulus (second round)
7. (Soviet Union) Natalia Zvereva (third round)
8. (France) Nathalie Tauziat (semifinal)
9. (Canada) Helen Kelesi (third round)
10. (Italy) Sandra Cecchini (first round)
11. (United States) Anne Smith (first round)
12. (Peru) Laura Gildemeister (third round)
13. (South Africa) Rosalyn Fairbank-Nideffer (first round)
14. (Germany) Anke Huber (third round)
15. n/a
16. (United States) Meredith McGrath (quarterfinal)

== Draw ==
=== Key ===
- Q = Qualifier
- WC = Wild card
- LL = Lucky loser
- Alt = Alternate
- ITF = ITF entry
- PR = Protected ranking
- SR = Special ranking
- SE = Special exempt
- JE = Junior exempt
- JR = Junior Accelerator Programme entrant
- CO = College Accelerator Programme entrant
- NG = Next Gen Accelerator Program entrant
- w/o = Walkover
- r = Retired
- d = Defaulted

=== Finals ===
Quarterfinals
1	(West Germany) Steffi Graf	6	6
16	(United States) Meredith McGrath	3	1
3	(United States) M Joe Fernández	1	5
8	(France) Nathalie Tauziat	6	7
(West Germany) Claudia Porwik	1	4
4	(United States) Jennifer Capriati	6	6
(Czechoslovakia) Regina Rajchrtová	2	2
2	(Argentina) Gabriela Sabatini	6	6

Semifinals
1	(West Germany) Steffi Graf	6	6
8	(France) Nathalie Tauziat	1	2
4	(United States) Jennifer Capriati	5	2
2	(Argentina) Gabriela Sabatini	7	6

Final
1	(West Germany) Steffi Graf	4	6
2	(Argentina) Gabriela Sabatini	6	7

=== Top half ===
==== Section 1 ====
First round
(Sweden) C Dahlman	6	6
Q	(United Kingdom) S Smith	0	0
(Czechoslovakia) A Strnadová	6	7
(France) J Halard	4	5
(France) N Herreman	3	5
14	(Germany) A Huber	6	7
16	(United States) M McGrath	6	6
(United States) M Daniels	2	0
(United States) L Harvey-Wild	6	6
Q	(United States) L Allen	4	1
(United States) L Bonder-Kreiss	6	6
Q	(United States) S Stafford	4	1

Second round
1	(West Germany) S Graf	w/o
(Sweden) C Dahlman
(Czechoslovakia) A Strnadová	6	7
14	(Germany) A Huber	2	5
16	(United States) M McGrath	3	6	6
(United States) L Harvey-Wild	6	3	0
(United States) L Bonder-Kreiss	6	6
6	(Austria) B Paulus	4	2

Third round
1	(West Germany) S Graf	6	6
14	(Germany) A Huber	0	1
16	(United States) M McGrath	6	6
(United States) L Bonder-Kreiss	4	3

Quarterfinals
1	(West Germany) Steffi Graf	6	6
16	(United States) Meredith McGrath	3	1

==== Section 2 ====
First round
LL	(France) I Demongeot	1	0
(South Africa) A Coetzer	6	3^{r}
(Italy) L Ferrando	6	4	6
(Bulgaria) E Pampoulova	0	6	3
(Czechoslovakia) K Habšudová	4	3
12	(Peru) L Gildemeister	6	6
10	(Italy) S Cecchini	1	0
Q	(Argentina) B Fulco	6	6
(Hong Kong) P Hy	6	6	7
(United Kingdom) J Durie	7	1	5
(United States) M Harper	7	4	6
Q	(United States) J Shiflet	5	6	2

Second round
3	(United States) M J Fernandez	6	6
(South Africa) A Coetzer	4	1
(Italy) L Ferrando	7	6
12	(Peru) L Gildemeister	5	4
Q	(Argentina) B Fulco	6	2
(Hong Kong) P Hy	7	6
(United States) M Harper	0	3
8	(France) N Tauziat	6	6

Third round
3	(United States) M J Fernandez	7	6
12	(Peru) L Gildemeister	5	4
(Hong Kong) P Hy	2	4
8	(France) N Tauziat	6	6

Quarterfinals
3	(United States) Mary Joe Fernández	1	5
8	(France) Nathalie Tauziat	6	7

=== Bottom half ===
==== Section 1 ====
First round
(France) A Dechaume	6	5	4
(West Germany) C Porwik	2	7	6
(Soviet Union) E Brioukhovets	1	0
Q	(United States) H Cioffi	6	6
(Switzerland) C Caverzasio	1	6	2
9	(Canada) H Kelesi	6	3	6
13	(South Africa) R Fairbank-Nideffer	6	4	2
(United States) G Fernandez	4	6	6
(United Kingdom) S Gomer	4	4
(United States) S Martin	6	6
(Luxembourg) K Kschwendt	6	7
WC	(United States) A Grossman	3	5

Second round
5	(Spain) C Martínez	4	6	5
(West Germany) C Porwik	6	3	7
Q	(United States) H Cioffi	6	6
9	(Canada) H Kelesi	3	1
(United States) G Fernandez	6	6
(United States) S Martin	3	4
(Luxembourg) K Kschwendt	7	1	1
4	(United States) J Capriati	6	6	6

Third round
(West Germany) C Porwik	6	7
9	(Canada) H Kelesi	4	5
(United States) G Fernandez	3	2
4	(United States) J Capriati	6	6

Quarterfinals
(West Germany) Claudia Porwik	1	4
4	(United States) Jennifer Capriati	6	6

==== Section 2 ====
First round
(United States) K Rinaldi	5	6
Q	(France) C Suire	7	7
(Soviet Union) L Savchenko	7	3	6
(Netherlands) B Schultz	5	6	3
Q	(United States) M Jackson-Nobrega	2	6
(Czechoslovakia) R Rajchrtová	6	7
11	(United States) A Smith	5	4
(United States) M Werdel	7	6
(United States) T Whitlinger	3	5
(Soviet Union) N Medvedeva	6	7
WC	(West Germany) B Rittner	6	1	6
LL	(United States) E de Lone	3	6	7

Second round
7	(Soviet Union) N Zvereva	7	6
Q	(France) C Suire	6	4
(Soviet Union) L Savchenko	4	5
(Czechoslovakia) R Rajchrtová	6	7
(United States) M Werdel	6	4	7
(Soviet Union) N Medvedeva	4	6	5
(United States) E de Lone	2	2
2	(Argentina) G Sabatini	6	6

Third round
7	(Soviet Union) N Zvereva	3	3
(Czechoslovakia) R Rajchrtová	6	6
(United States) M Werdel	3	0
2	(Argentina) G Sabatini	6	6

Quarterfinals
(Czechoslovakia) Regina Rajchrtová	2	2
2	(Argentina) Gabriela Sabatini	6	6
