= 1991 Virginia Slims of Florida – Doubles =

Doubles
- 1991 Virginia Slims of Florida

Final
- Champions: (Soviet Union) Larisa Neiland (Soviet Union) Natasha Zvereva
- Runners-up: (United States) Meredith McGrath (United States) Anne Smith
- Score: 6–4, 7–6^{(7–3)}

Details
- Draw: 28
- Seeds: 8

Events
| Singles | Doubles |
- Virginia Slims of Florida

The defending champions were Jana Novotná and Helena Suková, but chose not to participate. Larisa Neiland and Natasha Zvereva won the title, defeating Meredith McGrath and Anne Smith in the final, 6–4, 7–6^{(7–3)}.

== Seeds ==
The top four seeds received a bye to the second round.

1. (United States) Kathy Jordan / (Australia) Elizabeth Smylie (quarterfinal)
2. (Soviet Union) Larisa Savchenko / (Soviet Union) Natalia Zvereva (champions)
3. (United States) Mary Joe Fernández / (United States) Zina Garrison-Jackson (quarterfinal)
4. (United States) Meredith McGrath / (United States) Anne Smith (final)
5. (United States) Elise Burgin / (Canada) Helen Kelesi (first round)
6. (Canada) Jill Hetherington / (United States) Kathy Rinaldi (semifinal)
7. (South Africa) Rosalyn Fairbank-Nideffer / (Netherlands) Brenda Schultz (second round)
8. (Soviet Union) Elena Brioukhovets / (Soviet Union) Natalia Medvedeva (second round)

== Draw ==
Key

- Q = Qualifier
- WC = Wild card
- LL = Lucky loser
- Alt = Alternate
- ITF = ITF entry
- PR = Protected ranking
- SR = Special ranking
- SE = Special exempt
- JE = Junior exempt
- JR = Junior Accelerator Programme entrant
- CO = College Accelerator Programme entrant
- NG = Next Gen Accelerator Program entrant
- w/o = Walkover
- r = Retired
- d = Defaulted

=== Finals ===
Semifinals
6 | (Canada) Jill Hetherington (United States) Kathy Rinaldi | 4 | 1
4 | (United States) Meredith McGrath (United States) Anne Smith | 6 | 6
(Switzerland) Cathy Caverzasio (France) Nathalie Herreman | 6 | 5
2 | (Soviet Union) Larisa Savchenko (Soviet Union) Natalia Zvereva | 7 | 7

Final
4 | (United States) Meredith McGrath (United States) Anne Smith | 4 | 6
2 | (Soviet Union) Larisa Savchenko (Soviet Union) Natalia Zvereva | 6 | 7

=== Top half ===
First round
(United States) S Collins (France) C Suire | 6 | 7 | 6
(Italy) S Cecchini (West Germany) C Porwik | 7 | 6 | 3
(United States) J Smoller (United States) M Werdel | 3 | 6 | 0
(United States) K Adams (United States) P Mager | 6 | 4 | 6
(Belgium) A Devries (United States) S Stafford | 4 | 1
6 | (Canada) J Hetherington (United States) K Rinaldi | 6 | 6
(Peru) L Gildemeister (Denmark) T Scheuer-Larsen | 6 | 7 | 3
(West Germany) E Pfaff (Australia) R Stubbs | 7 | 6 | 6
(France) I Demongeot (France) N Tauziat | 3 | 2
(United States) L Bonder-Kreiss (United States) M Jackson-Nobrega | 3 | 0
7 | (South Africa) R Fairbank-Nideffer (Netherlands) B Schultz | 6 | 6

Second round
1 | (United States) K Jordan (Australia) E Smylie | 6 | 6
(United States) S Collins (France) C Suire | 2 | 1
(United States) K Adams (United States) P Mager | 3 | 4
6 | (Canada) J Hetherington (United States) K Rinaldi | 6 | 6
4 | (United States) M McGrath (United States) A Smith | 6 | 6
(West Germany) E Pfaff (Australia) R Stubbs | 2 | 2
(Netherlands) M Bollegraf (Netherlands) C Vis | 2 | 7 | 6
7 | (South Africa) R Fairbank-Nideffer (Netherlands) B Schultz | 6 | 5 | 3

Quarterfinals
1 | (United States) K Jordan (Australia) E Smylie | 3 | 4
6 | (Canada) J Hetherington (United States) K Rinaldi | 6 | 6
4 | (United States) M McGrath (United States) A Smith | 6 | 6
(Netherlands) M Bollegraf (Netherlands) C Vis | 4 | 4

Semifinals
6 | (Canada) Jill Hetherington (United States) Kathy Rinaldi | 6 | 6
4 | (United States) Meredith McGrath (United States) Anne Smith | 4 | 1

=== Bottom half ===
First round
5 | (United States) E Burgin (Canada) H Kelesi | 2 | 7 | 6
(Switzerland) C Caverzasio (France) N Herreman | 6 | 6 | 7
(Spain) C Martínez (Hungary) A Temesvári-Trunkos | 3 | 4
(Czechoslovakia) R Rajchrtová (Czechoslovakia) A Strnadová | 6 | 6
(United Kingdom) J Durie (Australia) M Jaggard | 6 | 2 | 6
(Canada) R Simpson-Alter (Netherlands) H ter Riet | 2 | 6 | 7
8 | (Soviet Union) E Brioukhovets (Soviet Union) N Medvedeva | 6 | 5 | 6
(United States) P Casale-Telford (United States) L Spadea | 1 | 7 | 3
(United States) J Capriati (United States) G Fernández | 7 | 4 | 6
(United States) M Daniels (United States) M Harper | 6 | 6 | 2
(France) A Dechaume (France) M Pierce | 6 | 6
(Australia) J Faull (New Zealand) J Richardson | 0 | 1

Second round
(Switzerland) C Caverzasio (France) N Herreman | 7 | 6
(Czechoslovakia) R Rajchrtová (Czechoslovakia) A Strnadová | 6 | 1
(Canada) R Simpson-Alter (Netherlands) H ter Riet | 1 | 3
3 | (United States) M J Fernández (United States) Z Garrison-Jackson | 6 | 6
8 | (Soviet Union) E Brioukhovets (Soviet Union) N Medvedeva | 5 | 1
(United States) J Capriati (United States) G Fernández | 7 | 6
(France) A Dechaume (France) M Pierce | 5 | 7 | 2
2 | (Soviet Union) L Savchenko (Soviet Union) N Zvereva | 7 | 5 | 6

Quarterfinals
(Switzerland) C Caverzasio (France) N Herreman | w/o
3 | (United States) M J Fernández (United States) Z Garrison-Jackson
(United States) J Capriati (United States) G Fernández | 6 | 5
2 | (Soviet Union) L Savchenko (Soviet Union) N Zvereva | 7 | 7

Semifinals
(Switzerland) Cathy Caverzasio (France) Nathalie Herreman | 7 | 7
2 | (Soviet Union) Larisa Savchenko (Soviet Union) Natalia Zvereva | 6 | 5
