= 1990 Virginia Slims of Florida – Doubles =

Doubles
- 1990 Virginia Slims of Florida

Final
- Champions: (Czechoslovakia) Jana Novotná (Czechoslovakia) Helena Suková
- Runners-up: (United States) Elise Burgin (Australia) Wendy Turnbull
- Score: 6–4, 6–2

Details
- Draw: 28
- Seeds: 8

Events
Singles	Doubles
- Virginia Slims of Florida

Jana Novotná and Helena Suková successfully defended their title by defeating Elise Burgin and Wendy Turnbull 6–4, 6–2 in the final.

== Seeds ==
The top four seeds received a bye to the second round.

1. (Czechoslovakia) Jana Novotná / (Czechoslovakia) Helena Suková (champions)
2. (Australia) Hana Mandlíková / (United States) Pam Shriver (second round, withdrew)
3. (United States) Mary Joe Fernández / (United States) Betsy Nagelsen (semifinals, withdrew)
4. (United States) Elise Burgin / (Australia) Wendy Turnbull (final)
5. (Australia) Nicole Provis / (South Africa) Elna Reinach (first round)
6. (Netherlands) Brenda Schultz / (Hungary) Andrea Temesvári-Trunkos (semifinals)
7. (Netherlands) Manon Bollegraf / (Argentina) Mercedes Paz (quarterfinals)
8. (France) Nathalie Tauziat / (Austria) Judith Wiesner (quarterfinals)

== Draw ==
Key

- Q = Qualifier
- WC = Wild card
- LL = Lucky loser
- Alt = Alternate
- ITF = ITF entry
- PR = Protected ranking
- SR = Special ranking
- SE = Special exempt
- JE = Junior exempt
- JR = Junior Accelerator Programme entrant
- CO = College Accelerator Programme entrant
- NG = Next Gen Accelerator Program entrant
- w/o = Walkover
- r = Retired
- d = Defaulted

=== Finals ===
Semifinals
1	(Czechoslovakia) Jana Novotná (Czechoslovakia) Helena Suková	w/o
3	(United States) Mary Joe Fernández (United States) Betsy Nagelsen
4	(United States) Elise Burgin (Australia) Wendy Turnbull	6	4	6
6	(Netherlands) Brenda Schultz (Hungary) Andrea Temesvári-Trunkos	4	6	4

Final
1	(Czechoslovakia) Jana Novotná (Czechoslovakia) Helena Suková	6	6
4	(United States) Elise Burgin (Australia) Wendy Turnbull	4	2

=== Top half ===
First round
(United States) P Barg-Mager (United States) P Louie Harper	6	6
(France) S Amiach (France) M Pierce	3	1
(France) I Demongeot (West Germany) E Pfaff	6	7
(United States) ML Daniels (United States) A Smith	0	6
(South Africa) L Barnard (United States) R Reis	3	3
7	(Netherlands) M Bollegraf (Argentina) M Paz	6	6
(Argentina) F Labat (Czechoslovakia) E Švíglerová	7	7
(United States) L Allen (South Africa) D Van Rensburg	6	5
(United States) T Phelps (United States) S Stafford	6	6
(Brazil) L Corsato-Owsianka (United States) L Spadea	1	4
(New Zealand) B Cordwell (United Kingdom) J Durie	3	7	7
5	(Australia) N Provis (South Africa) E Reinach	6	5	6

Second round
1	(Czechoslovakia) J Novotná (Czechoslovakia) H Suková	6	6
(United States) P Barg-Mager (United States) P Louie Harper	2	4
(France) I Demongeot (West Germany) E Pfaff	1	5
7	(Netherlands) M Bollegraf (Argentina) M Paz	6	7
3	(United States) MJ Fernández (United States) B Nagelsen	6	6
(Argentina) F Labat (Czechoslovakia) E Švíglerová	2	2
(United States) T Phelps (United States) S Stafford	3	2
(New Zealand) B Cordwell (United Kingdom) J Durie	6	6

Quarterfinals
1	(Czechoslovakia) J Novotná (Czechoslovakia) H Suková	6	7
7	(Netherlands) M Bollegraf (Argentina) M Paz	2	5
3	(United States) MJ Fernández (United States) B Nagelsen	6	6
(New Zealand) B Cordwell (United Kingdom) J Durie	4	3

Semifinals
1	(Czechoslovakia) J Novotná (Czechoslovakia) H Suková	w/o
3	(United States) MJ Fernández (United States) B Nagelsen

=== Bottom half ===
First round
8	(France) N Tauziat (Austria) J Wiesner	6	4	7
(France) N Herreman (Soviet Union) L Savchenko-Neiland	4	6	6
(Italy) R Reggi (Socialist Federal Republic of Yugoslavia) M Seles	6	6
(United States) H Cioffi (United States) A Grossman	3	1
(France) J Halard (Belgium) S Wasserman	6	2
(United States) A May (Japan) N Miyagi	7	6
6	(Netherlands) B Schultz (Hungary) A Temesvári-Trunkos	6	6
(United States) J Fuchs (Sweden) M Strandlund	3	1
(United States) J Capriati (United States) BJ King	6	6
(Italy) L Golarsa (West Germany) C Porwik	2	3
(Czechoslovakia) J Pospíšilová (Czechoslovakia) R Zrubáková	6	3	4
(Canada) R Simpson (Argentina) A Villagrán-Reami	2	6	6

Second round
8	(France) N Tauziat (Austria) J Wiesner	6	6
(Italy) R Reggi (Socialist Federal Republic of Yugoslavia) M Seles	2	1
(United States) A May (Japan) N Miyagi	4	4
4	(United States) E Burgin (Australia) W Turnbull	6	6
6	(Netherlands) B Schultz (Hungary) A Temesvári-Trunkos	6	6
(United States) J Capriati (United States) BJ King	3	2
(Canada) R Simpson (Argentina) A Villagrán-Reami	w/o
2	(Australia) H Mandlíková (United States) P Shriver

Quarterfinals
8	(France) N Tauziat (Austria) J Wiesner	6	4	6
4	(United States) E Burgin (Australia) W Turnbull	3	6	7
6	(Netherlands) B Schultz (Hungary) A Temesvári-Trunkos	6	6
(Canada) R Simpson (Argentina) A Villagrán-Reami	2	3

Semifinals
4	(United States) E Burgin (Australia) W Turnbull	6	4	6
6	(Netherlands) B Schultz (Hungary) A Temesvári-Trunkos	4	6	4
