= 1989 Virginia Slims of Florida – Singles =

Singles
- 1989 Virginia Slims of Florida
- 1988 Champion: (Argentina) Gabriela Sabatini

Final
- Champion: (West Germany) Steffi Graf
- Runner-up: (United States) Chris Evert
- Score: 4–6, 6–2, 6–3

Details
- Draw: 56
- Seeds: 16

Events
Singles	Doubles
← 1988 ·	Virginia Slims of Florida	· 1990 →

Gabriela Sabatini was the defending champion of the singles event of the 1989 Virginia Slims of Florida tennis tournament but lost in the third round to Terry Phelps.

Steffi Graf won in the final 4–6, 6–2, 6–3 against Chris Evert.

== Seeds ==
A champion seed is indicated in bold text while text in italics indicates the round in which that seed was eliminated. The top eight seeds received a bye to the second round.

1. (West Germany) **Steffi Graf (champion)**
2. (Argentina) Gabriela Sabatini (third round)
3. (United States) Chris Evert (final)
4. (Czechoslovakia) Helena Suková (semifinals)
5. (United States) Mary Joe Fernández (quarterfinals)
6. (West Germany) Sylvia Hanika (second round)
7. (Canada) Helen Kelesi (quarterfinals)
8. (Spain) Arantxa Sánchez (third round)
9. (Italy) Sandra Cecchini (second round)
10. (Argentina) Bettina Fulco (first round)
11. (Australia) Nicole Provis (second round)
12. (United States) Susan Sloane (second round)
13. (Italy) Raffaella Reggi (first round)
14. (France) Nathalie Tauziat (second round)
15. (Austria) Barbara Paulus (third round)
16. (Australia) Anne Minter (first round)

== Draw ==
=== Key ===
- Q = Qualifier
- WC = Wild card
- LL = Lucky loser
- Alt = Alternate
- SE = Special exempt
- PR = Protected ranking
- ITF = ITF entry
- JE = Junior exempt
- w/o = Walkover
- r = Retired
- d = Defaulted
- SR = Special ranking

=== Finals ===
Semifinals
1	(West Germany) **Steffi Graf**	**6**	**6**
4	(Czechoslovakia) Helena Suková	2	1
3	(United States) **Chris Evert**	**7**	**6**
(Czechoslovakia) Jana Novotná	5	1

Final
1	(West Germany) **Steffi Graf**	4	**6**	**6**
3	(United States) Chris Evert	**6**	2	3

=== Top half ===
==== Section 1 ====
First round
(South Africa) **E Reinach**	4	**6**	**6**
(United Kingdom) S Gomer	**6**	3	2
(United States) **A Frazier**	2	**7**	**7**
(United States) G Fernández	**6**	5	5
(Czechoslovakia) R Zrubáková	4	2
12	(United States) **S Sloane**	**6**	**6**
13	(Italy) R Reggi	3	**7**	4
(Australia) **J Byrne**	**6**	6	**6**
Q	(Canada) **R Simpson**	**6**	**6**
(Argentina) C Tessi	1	3
(France) I Demongeot	6	**6**	3
Q	(United States) **M L Daniels**	**7**	1	**6**

Second round
1	(West Germany) **S Graf**	**6**	**6**
(South Africa) E Reinach	1	2
(United States) A Frazier	1	1
12	(United States) **S Sloane**	**6**	**6**
(Australia) J Byrne	5	**6**	4
Q	(Canada) **R Simpson**	**7**	3	**6**
Q	(United States) M L Daniels	2	0
7	(Canada) **H Kelesi**	**6**	**6**

Third round
1	(West Germany) **S Graf**	**6**	**6**
12	(United States) S Sloane	0	1
Q	(Canada) R Simpson	5	5
7	(Canada) **H Kelesi**	**7**	**7**

Quarterfinals
1	(West Germany) **S Graf**	**6**	**6**
7	(Canada) H Kelesi	1	1

==== Section 2 ====
First round
(Argentina) M Paz	3	6
Q	(United States) **K Adams**	**6**	**7**
(Argentina) **P Tarabini**	3	**6**	**6**
(West Germany) E Pfaff	**6**	2	1
(South Africa) **R Fairbank**	6	**6**	**6**
16	(Australia) A Minter	**7**	3	4
10	(Argentina) B Fulco	2	1
(New Zealand) **B Cordwell**	**6**	**6**
(South Africa) D Van Rensburg	**6**	4	4
(United States) **H Cioffi**	3	**6**	**6**
(United States) **A Grossman**	**6**	2	**6**
(United States) E Hakami	4	**6**	4

Second round
4	(Czechoslovakia) **H Suková**	6	**7**	**6**
Q	(United States) K Adams	**7**	6	2
(Argentina) P Tarabini	2	2
(South Africa) **R Fairbank**	**6**	**6**
(New Zealand) B Cordwell	**6**	1	2
(United States) **H Cioffi**	3	**6**	**6**
(United States) **A Grossman**	**6**	**7**
6	(West Germany) S Hanika	3	6

Third round
4	(Czechoslovakia) **H Suková**	**7**	**6**
(South Africa) R Fairbank	6	0
(United States) **H Cioffi**	3	**6**	**6**
(United States) A Grossman	**6**	1	1

Quarterfinals
4	(Czechoslovakia) **H Suková**	**6**	**6**
(United States) H Cioffi	3	2

=== Bottom half ===
==== Section 3 ====
First round
(Australia) D Balestrat	2	2
Q	(Denmark) **T Scheuer-Larsen**	**6**	**6**
(United States) K Horvath	**7**	6	5
(United States) **P Louie-Harper**	6	**7**	**7**
(Netherlands) N Jagerman	1	4
11	(Australia) **N Provis**	**6**	**6**
15	(Austria) **B Paulus**	3	**6**	**6**
Q	(Japan) N Miyagi	**6**	1	2
(Netherlands) **B Schultz**	**6**	3	**6**
Q	(France) A Dechaume	2	**6**	3
Q	(France) **C Suire**	**6**	**7**
(United States) S Stafford	4	6

Second round
5	(United States) **M J Fernández**	2	**6**	**7**
Q	(Denmark) T Scheuer-Larsen	**6**	1	6
(United States) **P Louie-Harper**	2	**6**	**6**
11	(Australia) N Provis	**6**	1	1
15	(Austria) **B Paulus**	4	**6**	**6**
(Netherlands) B Schultz	**6**	3	4
Q	(France) C Suire	1	0
3	(United States) **C Evert**	**6**	**6**

Third round
5	(United States) **M J Fernández**	**6**	**6**
(United States) P Louie-Harper	3	4
15	(Austria) B Paulus	0	5
3	(United States) **C Evert**	**6**	**7**

Quarterfinals
5	(United States) M J Fernández	2	3
3	(United States) **C Evert**	**6**	**6**

==== Section 4 ====
First round
(United States) **K Gompert**	6	**6**	**6**
(Brazil) N Dias	**7**	2	2
(Czechoslovakia) **J Novotná**	**6**	**6**
Q	(South Africa) K Schimper	4	4
(Italy) L Ferrando	1	4
14	(France) **N Tauziat**	**6**	**6**
9	(Italy) **S Cecchini**	3	**7**	**6**
(United Kingdom) J Durie	**6**	6	2
(Socialist Federal Republic of Yugoslavia) S Goleš	2	1
(United States) **T Phelps**	**6**	**6**
(Italy) L Garrone	3	4
(Japan) **E Inoue**	**6**	**6**

Second round
8	(Spain) **A Sánchez**	**6**	**6**
(United States) K Gompert	2	1
(Czechoslovakia) **J Novotná**	**6**	**6**
14	(France) N Tauziat	4	4
9	(Italy) S Cecchini	1	2
(United States) **T Phelps**	**6**	**6**
(Japan) E Inoue	2	**6**	4
2	(Argentina) **G Sabatini**	**6**	4	**6**

Third round
8	(Spain) A Sánchez	4	1
(Czechoslovakia) **J Novotná**	**6**	**6**
(United States) **T Phelps**	**6**	**7**
2	(Argentina) G Sabatini	2	6

Quarterfinals
(Czechoslovakia) **J Novotná**	**6**	**6**
(United States) T Phelps	3	2
