= 1985 Virginia Slims of Florida =

- Date: January 21–27
- Edition: 7th
- Draw: 56S / 32D
- Prize money: $150,000
- Surface: Hard / outdoors
- Location: Key Biscayne, Florida, U.S.

Champions

Singles
- (United States) Chris Evert-Lloyd

Doubles
- (United States) Kathy Jordan / (Australia) Elizabeth Smylie
| ← 1984 · | Virginia Slims of Florida | · 1986 → |

The 1985 Virginia Slims of Florida, also known as the VS of Florida, was a women's tennis tournament played on outdoor hard courts in Key Biscayne, Florida in the United States that was part of the 1984 Virginia Slims World Championship Series. (Note: The 1984 Virginia Slims World Championship Series ran from March 1984 through March 1985.) It was the seventh edition of the tournament and was played from January 21 through January 27, 1985. Second-seeded Chris Evert-Lloyd won the singles title.

== Finals ==
=== Singles ===
(United States) Chris Evert-Lloyd defeated (United States) Martina Navratilova 6–2, 6–4

- It was Evert-Lloyd's 1st singles title of the year and the 133rd of her career.

=== Doubles ===
(United States) Kathy Jordan / (Australia) Elizabeth Smylie defeated (Soviet Union) Svetlana Parkhomenko / (Soviet Union) Larisa Neiland 6–4 7–6

== See also ==
- Evert–Navratilova rivalry
