= 1987 Virginia Slims of Florida =

- Date: February 16–22
- Edition: 9th
- Category: Category 4
- Draw: 56S / 28D
- Prize money: $250,000
- Location: Boca Raton, Florida, U.S.
- Venue: The Polo Club

Champions

Singles
- (West Germany) Steffi Graf

Doubles
- (Soviet Union) Svetlana Parkhomenko (Soviet Union) Larisa Savchenko
← 1986 ·	Virginia Slims of Florida	· 1988 →

The 1987 Virginia Slims of Florida was a women's tennis tournament played on outdoor hard courts at The Polo Club in Boca Raton, Florida in the United States and was part of the Category 4 tier of the 1987 WTA Tour. It was the ninth edition of the tournament and was held from February 16 through February 22, 1987. Second-seeded Steffi Graf won the singles title and earned $50,000 first-prize money.

== Finals ==
=== Singles ===
(West Germany) Steffi Graf defeated (Czechoslovakia) Helena Suková 6–2, 6–3

- It was Graf's 1st singles title of the year and the 9th of her career.

=== Doubles ===
(Soviet Union) Svetlana Parkhomenko / (Soviet Union) Larisa Savchenko defeated (United States) Chris Evert / (United States) Pam Shriver 6–0, 3–6, 6–2

- It was Parkhomenko's 3rd doubles title of the year and the 6th of her career. It was Savchenko's 3rd title of the year and the 6th of her career.
