= Virginia Slims of Florida =

Defunct tennis tournament
- Event name: Virginia Slims of Florida (1984–94); Delray Beach Winter Championships (1995)
- Tour: WTA Tour
- Founded: 1984
- Abolished: 1995
- Editions: 12
- Surface: Clay (1984); Hard (1985–95)

The Virginia Slims of Florida is a defunct WTA Tour affiliated tennis tournament played from 1984 to 1995 in various locations in Florida in the United States. It was held at the Frenchman's Creek Beach & Country Club in Palm Beach Gardens in 1984, at Crandon Park in Key Biscayne from 1985 to 1986, at the Polo Club in Boca Raton from 1987 to 1992, and at the Delray Beach Tennis Center in Delray Beach from 1993 to 1995. The tournament was played on outdoor clay courts in 1984 and on outdoor hard courts from 1985 to 1995.

Steffi Graf was the most successful player at the tournament, winning the singles competition six times. Past singles champions also include Chris Evert and Gabriela Sabatini, who both won the tournament three times.

== Past finals ==
=== Singles ===
Year	Champions	Runners-up	Score
1984	(United States) Chris Evert-Lloyd	(United States) Bonnie Gadusek	6–0, 6–1
1985	(United States) Chris Evert-Lloyd	(United States) Martina Navratilova	6–2, 6–4
1986	(United States) Chris Evert-Lloyd	(West Germany) Steffi Graf	6–3, 6–1
1987	(West Germany) Steffi Graf	(Czechoslovakia) Helena Suková	6–2, 6–3
↓ Tier II tournament ↓
1988	(Argentina) Gabriela Sabatini	(West Germany) Steffi Graf	2–6, 6–3, 6–1
1989	(West Germany) Steffi Graf	(United States) Chris Evert	4–6, 6–2, 6–3
1990	(Argentina) Gabriela Sabatini	(United States) Jennifer Capriati	6–4, 7–5
↓ Tier I tournament ↓
1991	(Argentina) Gabriela Sabatini	(Germany) Steffi Graf	6–4, 7–6^{(8–6)}
1992	(Germany) Steffi Graf	(Spain) Conchita Martínez	3–6, 6–2, 6–0
↓ Tier II tournament ↓
1993	(Germany) Steffi Graf	(Spain) Arantxa Sánchez Vicario	6–4, 6–3
1994	(Germany) Steffi Graf	(Spain) Arantxa Sánchez Vicario	6–3, 7–5
1995	(Germany) Steffi Graf	(Spain) Conchita Martínez	6–2, 6–4

=== Doubles ===
Year	Champions	Runners-up	Score
1984	(United States) Betsy Nagelsen (United States) Anne White	(South Africa) Rosalyn Fairbank (United States) Candy Reynolds	2–6, 6–2, 6–2
1985	(United States) Kathy Jordan (Australia) Elizabeth Smylie	(Soviet Union) Svetlana Parkhomenko (Soviet Union) Larisa Savchenko	6–4, 7–6
1986	(United States) Kathy Jordan (Australia) Elizabeth Smylie	(United States) Betsy Nagelsen (United States) Barbara Potter	7–6, 2–6, 6–2
1987	(Soviet Union) Svetlana Parkhomenko (Soviet Union) Larisa Savchenko	(United States) Chris Evert-Lloyd (United States) Pam Shriver	6–0, 3–6, 6–2
↓ Tier II tournament ↓
1988	(United States) Katrina Adams (United States) Zina Garrison	(West Germany) Claudia Kohde-Kilsch (Czechoslovakia) Helena Suková	4–6, 7–5, 6–4
1989	(Czechoslovakia) Jana Novotná (Czechoslovakia) Helena Suková	(United Kingdom) Jo Durie (United States) Mary Joe Fernández	6–4, 6–2
1990	(Czechoslovakia) Jana Novotná (Czechoslovakia) Helena Suková	(United States) Elise Burgin (Australia) Wendy Turnbull	6–4, 6–2
↓ Tier I tournament ↓
1991	(Soviet Union) Larisa Savchenko (Soviet Union) Natasha Zvereva	(United States) Meredith McGrath (United States) Anne Smith	6–4, 7–6
1992	(Commonwealth of Independent States) Larisa Savchenko (Commonwealth of Independent States) Natasha Zvereva	(United States) Linda Harvey-Wild (Spain) Conchita Martínez	6–2, 6–2
↓ Tier II tournament ↓
1993	(United States) Gigi Fernández (Belarus) Natasha Zvereva	(Czech Republic) Jana Novotná (Latvia) Larisa Savchenko	6–2, 6–2
1994	(Czech Republic) Jana Novotná (Spain) Arantxa Sánchez Vicario	(Netherlands) Manon Bollegraf (Czech Republic) Helena Suková	6–2, 6–0
1995	(United States) Mary Joe Fernández (Czech Republic) Jana Novotná	(United States) Lori McNeil (Latvia) Larisa Savchenko	6–4, 6–0
