= 1993 Virginia Slims of Florida – Doubles =

Doubles
- 1993 Virginia Slims of Florida

Final
- Champions: (United States) Gigi Fernández (Belarus) Natasha Zvereva
- Runners-up: (Latvia) Larisa Neiland (Czechoslovakia) Jana Novotná
- Score: 6–2, 6–2

Details
- Draw: 28 (2WC/1Q)
- Seeds: 8

Events
Singles	Doubles
← 1992 ·	Virginia Slims of Florida	· 1994 →

Larisa Neiland and Natasha Zvereva were the defending champions, but chose to compete this year with different partners, facing each other in the final.

Zvereva, teaming up with Gigi Fernández, successfully defended her title by defeating Neiland and her partner Jana Novotná. The score was 6–2, 6–2.

== Seeds ==
The first four seeds received a bye to the second round.

1. (United States) Gigi Fernández / (Belarus) Natasha Zvereva (champions)
2. (Latvia) Larisa Neiland / (Czech Republic) Jana Novotná (final)
3. (Spain) Arantxa Sánchez Vicario / (Australia) Rennae Stubbs (semifinals)
4. (Canada) Jill Hetherington / (United States) Kathy Rinaldi (quarterfinals)
5. (United States) Mary Joe Fernández / (United States) Zina Garrison Jackson (quarterfinals)
6. (Germany) Steffi Graf / (United States) Stephanie Rehe (quarterfinals, withdrew)
7. (United States) Sandy Collins / (Australia) Rachel McQuillan (semifinals)
8. (Italy) Sandra Cecchini / (Argentina) Inés Gorrochategui (first round)

== Draw ==
Key

- Q = Qualifier
- WC = Wild card
- LL = Lucky loser
- Alt = Alternate
- ITF = ITF entry
- PR = Protected ranking
- SR = Special ranking
- SE = Special exempt
- JE = Junior exempt
- JR = Junior Accelerator Programme entrant
- CO = College Accelerator Programme entrant
- NG = Next Gen Accelerator Program entrant
- w/o = Walkover
- r = Retired
- d = Defaulted

=== Finals ===
Semifinals
1	(United States) Gigi Fernández (Belarus) Natasha Zvereva	6	6
3	(Spain) Arantxa Sánchez Vicario (Australia) Rennae Stubbs	1	3
7	(United States) Sandy Collins (Australia) Rachel McQuillan	2	5
2	(Latvia) Larisa Neiland (Czech Republic) Jana Novotná	6	7

Final
1	(United States) Gigi Fernández (Belarus) Natasha Zvereva	6	6
2	(Latvia) Larisa Neiland (Czech Republic) Jana Novotná	2	2

=== Top half ===
First round
(United States) N Arendt (United States) J Emmons	6	6
(United States) J Fuchs (Sweden) M Strandlund	2	3
(United States) L Davenport (United States) C Rubin	6	3	6
(Peru) L Gildemeister (Hungary) A Temesvári	2	6	3
WC	(Netherlands) H Ketelaars (United States) L Spadea	1	1
5	(United States) MJ Fernández (United States) Z Garrison Jackson	6	6
(Netherlands) M Oremans (Austria) P Ritter	2	4
(United States) L Harvey Wild (Germany) B Rittner	6	6
(United States) B Bowes (United States) T Whittington	5	6	7
(United States) Ca MacGregor (United States) S Stafford	7	2	5
(Finland) N Dahlman (United States) L Field	6	6
8	(Italy) S Cecchini (Argentina) I Gorrochategui	3	4

Second round
1	(United States) G Fernández (Belarus) N Zvereva	6	6
(United States) N Arendt (United States) J Emmons	1	2
(United States) L Davenport (United States) C Rubin	6	3	2
5	(United States) MJ Fernández (United States) Z Garrison Jackson	1	6	6
3	(Spain) A Sánchez Vicario (Australia) R Stubbs	6	6
(United States) L Harvey Wild (Germany) B Rittner	2	3
(United States) B Bowes (United States) T Whittington	5	5
(Finland) N Dahlman (United States) L Field	7	7

Quarterfinals
1	(United States) G Fernández (Belarus) N Zvereva	6	5	6
5	(United States) MJ Fernández (United States) Z Garrison Jackson	4	7	3
3	(Spain) A Sánchez Vicario (Australia) R Stubbs	6^{3}	6	6
(Finland) N Dahlman (United States) L Field	7^{7}	1	2

Semifinals
1	(United States) G Fernández (Belarus) N Zvereva	6	6
3	(Spain) A Sánchez Vicario (Australia) R Stubbs	1	3

=== Bottom half ===
First round
7	(United States) S Collins (Australia) R McQuillan	7^{7}	7^{7}
(Netherlands) B Schultz (Netherlands) C Vis	6^{2}	6^{3}
(South Africa) R Fairbank-Nideffer (United States) M McGrath	0	6	4
(Indonesia) Y Basuki (Japan) N Miyagi	6	2	6
(United States) S McCarthy (United States) M Werdel	6	6^{6}	7^{7}
(Australia) T Morton (United Kingdom) C Wood	4	7^{8}	6^{4}
6	(Germany) S Graf (United States) S Rehe	6	6
(Canada) R Simpson-Alter (Germany) M Živec-Škulj	4	2
WC	(United States) M Jackson-Nobrega (United States) Diana Spadea	1	2
(Japan) K Date (Slovakia) R Zrubáková	6	6
(Argentina) MJ Gaidano (Argentina) M Paz	6	4	6
Q	(United States) A deLone (United States) E deLone	1	6	2

Second round
7	(United States) S Collins (Australia) R McQuillan	7	6
(Indonesia) Y Basuki (Japan) N Miyagi	5	3
(United States) S McCarthy (United States) M Werdel	4	3
4	(Canada) J Hetherington (United States) K Rinaldi	6	6
6	(Germany) S Graf (United States) S Rehe	6	6
(Japan) K Date (Slovakia) R Zrubáková	3	1
(Argentina) MJ Gaidano (Argentina) M Paz	1	4
2	(Latvia) L Neiland (Czech Republic) J Novotná	6	6

Quarterfinals
7	(United States) S Collins (Australia) R McQuillan	6	3	7
4	(Canada) J Hetherington (United States) K Rinaldi	4	6	5
6	(Germany) S Graf (United States) S Rehe
2	(Latvia) L Neiland (Czech Republic) J Novotná	w/o

Semifinals
7	(United States) S Collins (Australia) R McQuillan	2	5
2	(Latvia) L Neiland (Czech Republic) J Novotná	6	7
