= 1993 Virginia Slims of Florida – Singles =

Singles
- 1993 Virginia Slims of Florida

Final
- Champion: (Germany) Steffi Graf
- Runner-up: (Spain) Arantxa Sánchez Vicario
- Score: 6–4, 6–3

Details
- Draw: 56 (2WC/8Q/2LL)
- Seeds: 16

Events
Singles	Doubles
← 1992 ·	Virginia Slims of Florida	· 1994 →

Steffi Graf successfully defended her title by defeating Arantxa Sánchez Vicario 6–4, 6–3 in the final.

== Seeds ==
The first eight seeds received a bye to the second round.

1. (Germany) Steffi Graf (champion)
2. (Spain) Arantxa Sánchez Vicario (final)
3. (Argentina) Gabriela Sabatini (third round)
4. (United States) Mary Joe Fernández (quarterfinals)
5. (Germany) Anke Huber (semifinals)
6. (Czech Republic) ~~Helena Suková~~ (withdrew)
7. (United States) Zina Garrison Jackson (quarterfinals)
8. (South Africa) Amanda Coetzer (semifinals)
9. (Belarus) Natasha Zvereva (third round)
10. (Japan) Kimiko Date (first round)
11. (United States) Gigi Fernández (first round)
12. (Belgium) Sabine Appelmans (first round)
13. (Canada) Patricia Hy (third round)
14. (Netherlands) Brenda Schultz (third round)
15. (Slovakia) Radka Zrubáková (second round)
16. (Italy) Sandra Cecchini (third round)

== Draw ==
Key

- Q = Qualifier
- WC = Wild card
- LL = Lucky loser
- Alt = Alternate
- ITF = ITF entry
- PR = Protected ranking
- SR = Special ranking
- SE = Special exempt
- JE = Junior exempt
- JR = Junior Accelerator Programme entrant
- CO = College Accelerator Programme entrant
- NG = Next Gen Accelerator Program entrant
- w/o = Walkover
- r = Retired
- d = Defaulted

=== Finals ===
Quarterfinals
1	(Germany) Steffi Graf	6	6^{3}	6
7	(United States) Zina Garrison Jackson	1	7^{7}	4
4	(United States) Mary Joe Fernández	4	4
5	(Germany) Anke Huber	6	6
8	(South Africa) Amanda Coetzer	6	6
(United States) Lindsay Davenport	4	2
(Germany) Barbara Rittner	1	0
2	(Spain) Arantxa Sánchez Vicario	6	6

Semifinals
1	(Germany) Steffi Graf	6	6
5	(Germany) Anke Huber	1	1
8	(South Africa) Amanda Coetzer	2	2
2	(Spain) Arantxa Sánchez Vicario	6	6

Final
1	(Germany) Steffi Graf	6	6
2	(Spain) Arantxa Sánchez Vicario	4	3

=== Top half ===
==== Section 1 ====
First round
(Argentina) M Paz	4	6	4
(Indonesia) Y Basuki	6	0	6
(Finland) N Dahlman	3	0
WC	(United States) A Grossman	6	6
(Croatia) I Majoli	7	2	6
11	(United States) G Fernández	5	6	3
14	(Netherlands) B Schultz	6	6
(United States) L Wild	1	4
(Germany) M Živec-Škulj	6	7^{7}
(United States) D Faber	4	6^{2}
(Australia) R McQuillan	6	4	3
(Netherlands) S Rottier	2	6	6

Second round
1	(Germany) S Graf	6	6
(Indonesia) Y Basuki	2	1
WC	(United States) A Grossman	3	3
(Croatia) I Majoli	6	6
14	(Netherlands) B Schultz	3	6	7^{7}
(Germany) M Živec-Škulj	6	3	6^{5}
(Netherlands) S Rottier	4	6	6^{3}
7	(United States) Z Garrison Jackson	6	3	7^{7}

Third round
1	(Germany) S Graf	6	6
(Croatia) I Majoli	2	2
14	(Netherlands) B Schultz	5	3
7	(United States) Z Garrison Jackson	7	6

Quarterfinals
1	(Germany) S Graf	6	6^{3}	6
7	(United States) Z Garrison Jackson	1	7^{7}	4

==== Section 2 ====
First round
Q	(Canada) R Simpson-Alter	6	6
(United States) C Rubin	2	4
(Australia) J Byrne	6	6
(Australia) R Stubbs	2	3
WC	(United States) L Spadea	2	3
16/WC	(Italy) S Cecchini	6	6
10	(Japan) K Date	2	4
(South Africa) R Fairbank-Nideffer	6	6
Q	(Argentina) MJ Gaidano	3	4
Q	(Canada) M Drake	6	6
LL	(United States) N Arendt	6	6
(Italy) G Pizzichini	4	2

Second round
4	(United States) MJ Fernández	6	6
Q	(Canada) R Simpson-Alter	2	2
(Australia) J Byrne	6	5	1
16/WC	(Italy) S Cecchini	4	7	6
(South Africa) R Fairbank-Nideffer	6	6
Q	(Canada) M Drake	4	4
LL	(United States) N Arendt	0	4
5	(Germany) A Huber	6	6

Third round
4	(United States) MJ Fernández	6	6
16/WC	(Italy) S Cecchini	1	3
(South Africa) R Fairbank-Nideffer	5	2
5	(Germany) A Huber	7	6

Quarterfinals
4	(United States) MJ Fernández	4	4
5	(Germany) A Huber	6	6

=== Bottom half ===
==== Section 3 ====
First round
(Germany) S Hack	0	4
(Japan) K Nagatsuka	6	6
(United States) S Rehe	4	6	6
(Netherlands) M Oremans	6	3	0
(Czech Republic) K Kroupová	2	3
15	(Slovakia) R Zrubáková	6	6
12	(Belgium) S Appelmans	3	4
LL	(Italy) F Romano	6	6
(United States) L Davenport	6	6
Q	(Austria) B Reinstadler	3	1
Q	(Greece) C Papadáki	6	6
(Latvia) L Neiland	3	1

Second round
8	(South Africa) A Coetzer	7	6
(Japan) K Nagatsuka	5	4
(United States) S Rehe	6	6
15	(Slovakia) R Zrubáková	3	0
LL	(Italy) F Romano	3	4
(United States) L Davenport	6	6
Q	(Greece) C Papadáki	2	3
3	(Argentina) G Sabatini	6	6

Third round
8	(South Africa) A Coetzer	5
(United States) S Rehe	3^{r}
(United States) L Davenport	7^{7}	6
3	(Argentina) G Sabatini	6^{5}	1

Quarterfinals
8	(South Africa) A Coetzer	6	6
(United States) L Davenport	4	2

==== Section 4 ====
First round
Q	(France) S Amiach	6	7
(Switzerland) C Fauche	3	5
Q	(United States) E Burgin	6	1	0
(United States) M Werdel	2	6	6
(Argentina) I Gorrochategui	4	0
9	(Belarus) N Zvereva	6	6
13	(Canada) P Hy	6	6
(Peru) L Gildemeister	0	2
Q	(United States) S McCarthy	7	6
(Japan) N Miyagi	5	3
(Canada) H Kelesi	6^{5}	6	6
(United States) L Allen	7^{7}	1	0

Second round
(Germany) B Rittner	6	6
Q	(France) S Amiach	4	1
(United States) M Werdel	5	3
9	(Belarus) N Zvereva	7	6
13	(Canada) P Hy	6	7
Q	(United States) S McCarthy	1	5
(Canada) H Kelesi	6^{3}	5
2	(Spain) A Sánchez Vicario	7^{7}	7

Third round
(Germany) B Rittner	6	6
9	(Belarus) N Zvereva	3	1
13	(Canada) P Hy	1	5
2	(Spain) A Sánchez Vicario	6	7

Quarterfinals
(Germany) B Rittner	1	0
2	(Spain) A Sánchez Vicario	6	6
