= Meierijstad =

- Municipality
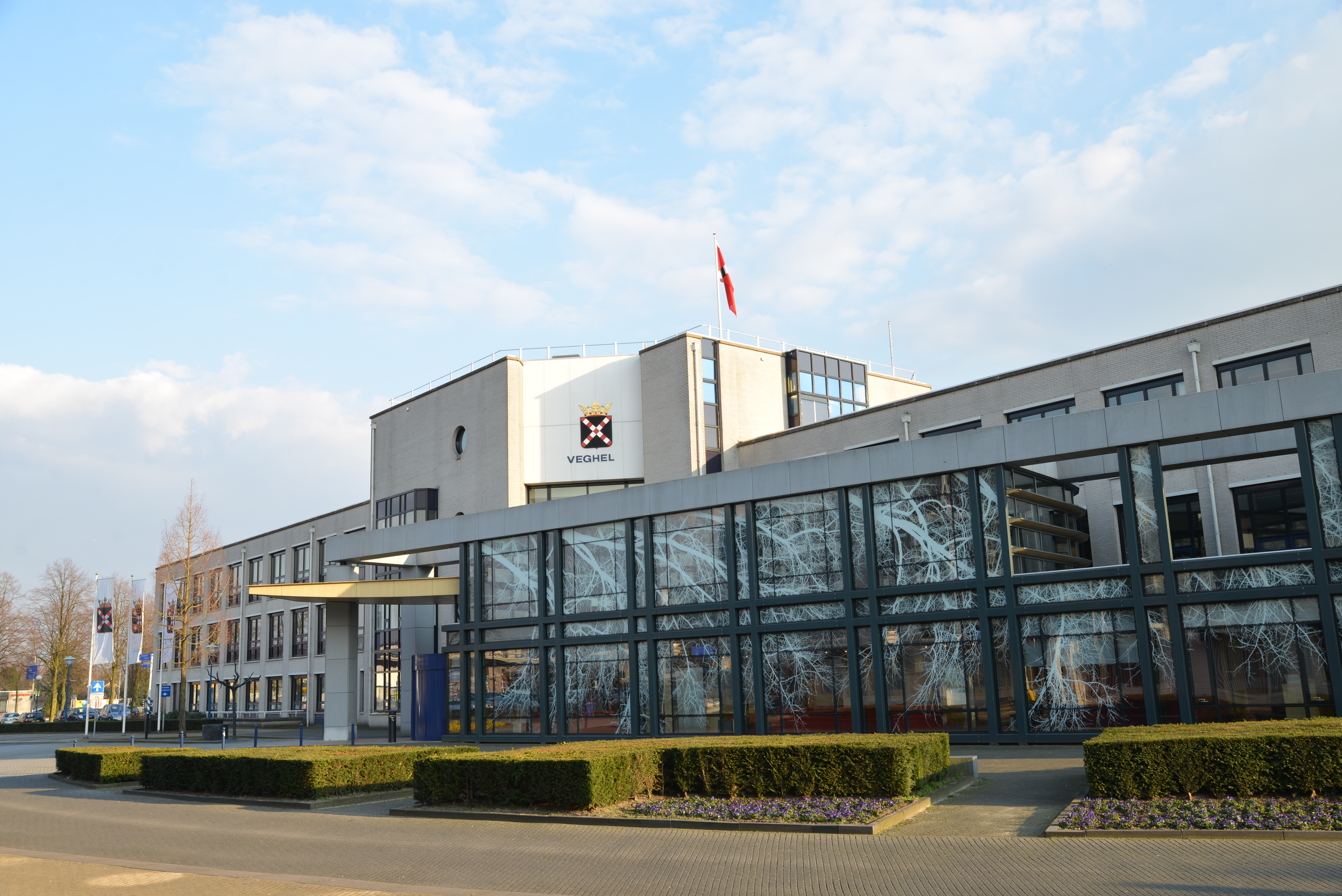
- Town hall in Veghel

- Flag Coat of arms

- Location in North Brabant
- Coordinates: 51°35′N 5°29′E
- Country: Netherlands
- Province: North Brabant

Government
  - Body: Municipal council
  - Mayor: Kees van Rooij (CDA)

Population (January 2021)
  - Municipality: 79.633
  - Density: 444/km^{2} (1,150/sq mi)
  - Uden-Veghel: 175,119
- Time zone: UTC+1 (CET)
  - Summer (DST): UTC+2 (CEST)
- Postcode: 5460-5467; 5480-5483; 5490-5492
- Area code: 0413, 073
- Core town: Veghel
  - Population: 31.352
- Website: www.meierijstad.nl

Meierijstad (Dutch pronunciation: [ˌmɛiəˈrɛistɑt]) is a municipality in the Dutch province of North Brabant. The municipality is the result of a merger between the municipalities Schijndel, Sint-Oedenrode and Veghel in 2017. After the merger it became North Brabant's largest municipality in terms of land area (surpassed by Altena in 2019). The town of Veghel hosts the town hall, while the municipal council holds its meetings at the former town hall of Sint-Oedenrode.

== Population centres ==
- Boerdonk
- Boskant
- Eerde
- Erp
- Keldonk
- Mariaheide
- Nijnsel
- Olland
- Schijndel
- Sint-Oedenrode
- Veghel
- Wijbosch
- Zijtaart

== Topography ==
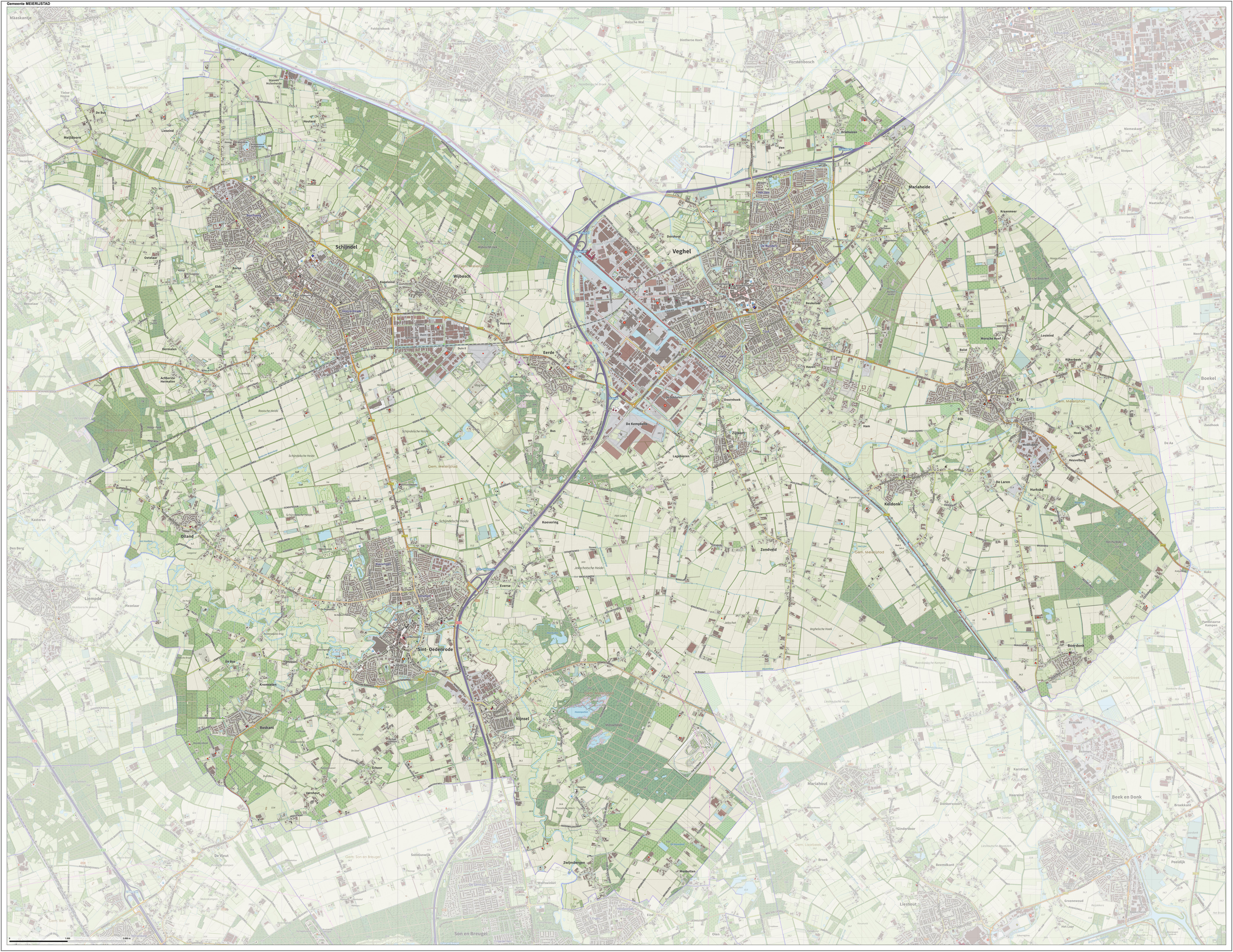

Dutch topographic map of the municipality of Meierijstad, 2020

== Notable people ==
- Hendrik Herp (died 1477) a Dutch or Flemish Franciscan and a writer on mysticism
- Pieter de Josselin de Jong (1861 in Sint-Oedenrode – 1906) Dutch painter from North Brabant
- Lou Tellegen (born 1881 in Sint-Oedenrode – 1934) Dutch stage and film actor, film director and screenwriter
- Ton Smits (1921 in Vegheland - 1981) Dutch cartoonist and comic artist
- Els Coppens-van de Rijt (born 1943 in Sint-Oedenrode) artist and author from Vlierden
- Anton Berns (born 1945 in Schijndel) Dutch scientist researching molecular genetics
- Hein Van de Geyn (born 1956 in Schijndel) jazz double bassist, composer and band leader
- Winy Maas (born 1959 in Schijndel) Dutch architect, landscape architect, professor and urbanist
- Nikki Kerkhof (born 1983 in Sint-Oedenrode) Dutch pop singer
- Sophie Bongers (born 1998) stage name Sophie Francis, Dutch record producer, DJ and musician, brought up in Sint-Oedenrode

=== Sport ===
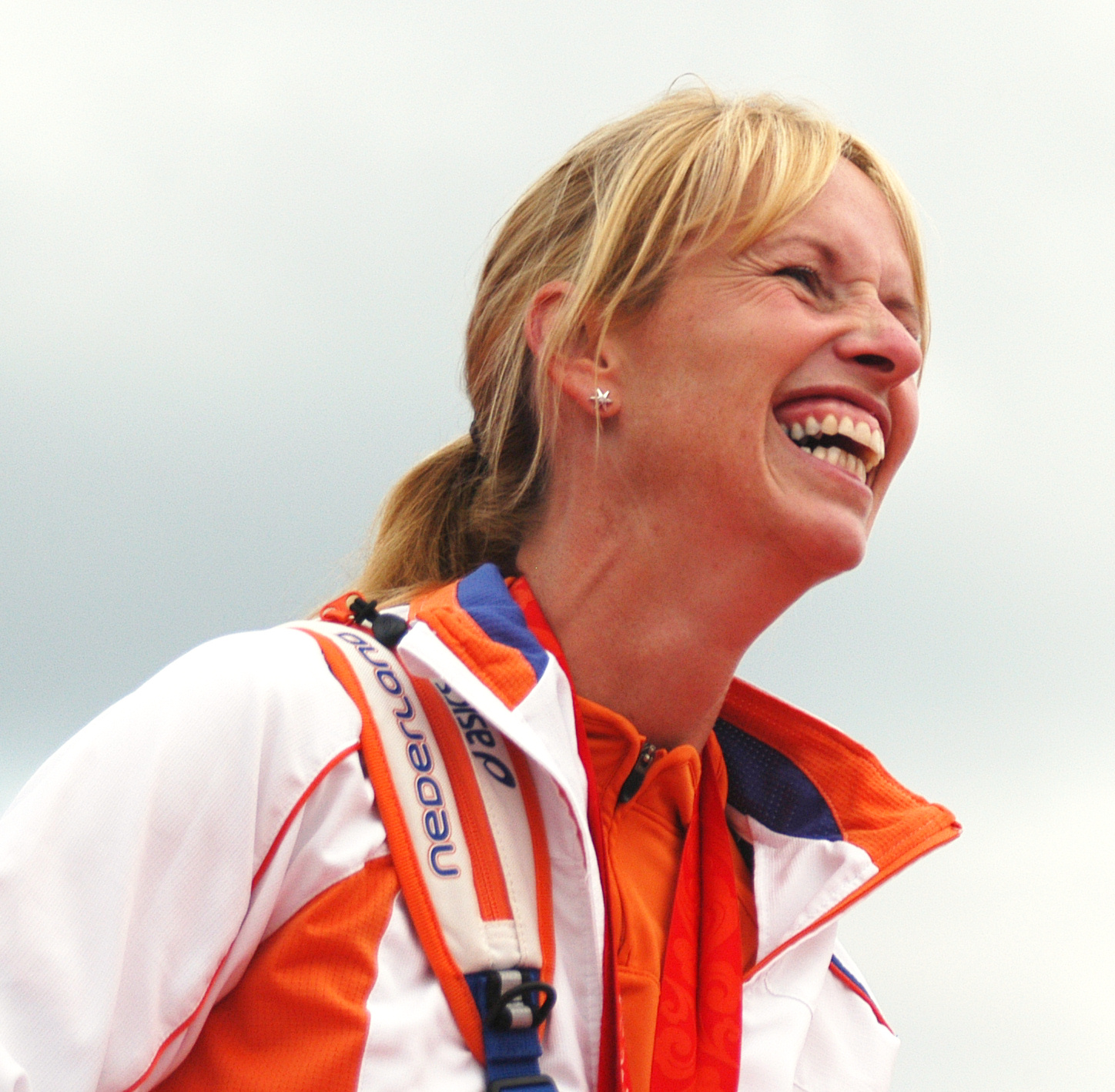
Anky van Grunsven, 2008

- Wiljan Vloet (born 1962 in Schijndel) Dutch football manager
- Monique Kalkman-Van Den Bosch (born 1964 in Sint-Oedenrode) Dutch wheelchair tennis player
- Eric Verhagen (born 1964 in Schijndel) Dutch retired sidecarcross passenger and double World Champion.
- Rein van Duijnhoven (born 1967 in Veghel) Dutch former football goalkeeper with over 500 club caps
- Anky van Grunsven (born 1968 in Erp) Dutch dressage champion with nine Olympic medals from seven successive games
- Jack de Gier (born 1968 in Schijndel) Dutch former footballer with over 400 club caps and current manager of Go Ahead Eagles
- Earnie Stewart (born 1969 in Veghel) American retired soccer player with 474 club caps and the sporting director of U.S. Soccer
- Stefan Jansen (born 1972 in Veghel) Dutch former football striker with over 330 club caps
- Dillianne van den Boogaard (born 1974 in Veghel) Dutch former field hockey defender, twice team bronze medallist in the 1996 and 2000 Summer Olympics
- Theo Lucius (born 1976 in Veghel) Dutch former footballer with 402 club caps
- Marloes Keetels (born 1993 in Schijndel) Dutch field hockey player, team silver medallist at the 2016 Summer Olympics
