= Hanneke Ketelaars =

Dutch tennis player

- Country (sports): Netherlands
- Born: 17 April 1974 (age 50); Mariaheide, Netherlands
- Prize money: $30,131

Singles
- Highest ranking: No. 186 (6 March 1995)

Grand Slam singles results
- Australian Open: Q1 (1995)

Doubles
- Career titles: 2 ITF
- Highest ranking: No. 182 (7 November 1994)

Hanneke Ketelaars (born 17 April 1974) is a Dutch former professional tennis player.

Ketelaars grew up in Mariaheide and would practise at a local tennis park run by her parents.

Competing professionally in the 1990s, Ketelaars reached a best singles ranking of 186 and featured in the qualifying draw for the 1995 Australian Open. Her only WTA Tour main draw appearance came as a doubles player at the 1993 Virginia Slims of Florida and she won two $25,000 ITF doubles titles during her career.

Following her retirement from the tour in 1996 she continued to play in amateur competitions, winning two Indoor and two Outdoor national championships.

== ITF finals ==
$25,000 tournaments
$10,000 tournaments

=== Singles: 2 (0–2) ===
Result	No.	Date	Tournament	Surface	Opponent	Score
Loss	1.	3 June 1991	Viana do Castelo, Portugal	Clay	(Sweden) Annika Narbe	6–3, 4–6, 2–6
Loss	2.	6 June 1994	Elvas, Portugal	Hard	(Australia) Kirrily Sharpe	2–6, 6–1, 3–6

=== Doubles: 4 (2–2) ===
Result	No.	Date	Tournament	Surface	Partner	Opponents	Score
Loss	1.	29 July 1991	A Coruña, Spain	Clay	(Greece) Christina Zachariadou	(Israel) Nelly Barkan (Ukraine) Olga Lugina	6–7^{(4–7)}, 3–6
Win	1.	27 February 1994	Rocafort, Spain	Hard	(Netherlands) Seda Noorlander	(Spain) Gala León García (Spain) Janet Souto	6–4, 6–4
Loss	2.	20 June 1994	Valladolid, Spain	Clay	(Czech Republic) Lenka Němečková	(Japan) Hiroko Mochizuki (Japan) Yuka Tanaka	0–6, 6–4, 2–6
Win	2.	18 July 1994	Bilbao, Spain	Clay	(Romania) Cătălina Cristea	(Spain) Yolanda Clemot (Spain) Cristina Torrens Valero	6–2, 6–1
