= Zijtaart =

- Village
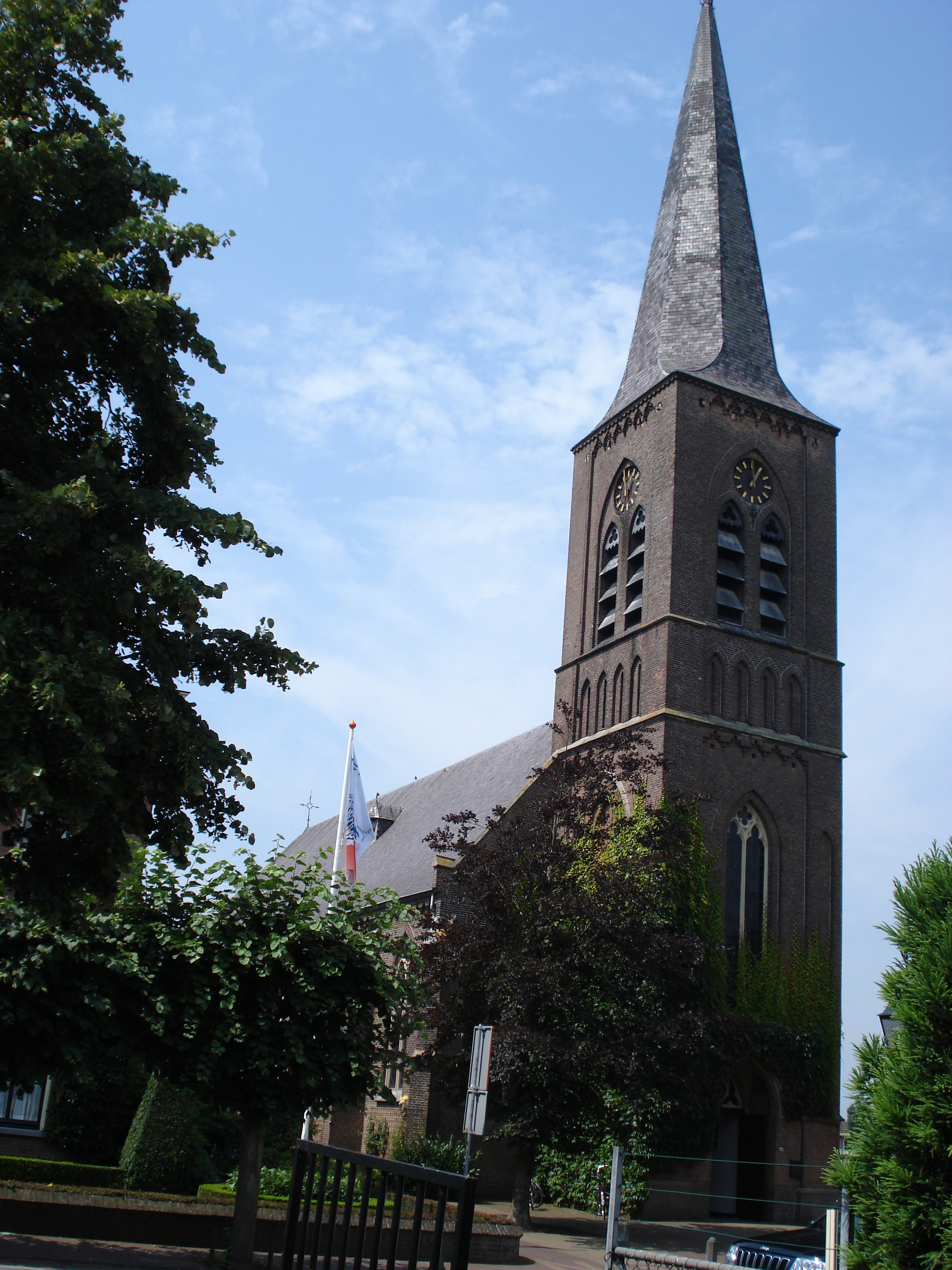
- St. Lambert Church in Zijtaart

- Location in the province of North Brabant in the Netherlands Zijtaart (Netherlands)
- Coordinates: 51°35′33″N 5°32′30″E
- Country: Netherlands
- Province: North Brabant
- Municipality: Meierijstad

Area
  - Total: 6.43 km^{2} (2.48 sq mi)
- Elevation: 12 m (39 ft)

Population (2021)
  - Total: 1,655
  - Density: 257/km^{2} (667/sq mi)
- Time zone: UTC+1 (CET)
  - Summer (DST): UTC+2 (CEST)
- Postal code: 5465
- Dialing code: 0413
- Major roads: A50, N265

Zijtaart is a village in the south of the Netherlands. It is situated in the municipality of Meierijstad, North Brabant. As of January 2015 it has a population of 1,727.

== History ==
Zijtaart as a church village was officially founded in 1872 when it split off as a separate parish from the St. Lambert Parish in Veghel. The church of the Zijtaart St. Lambert Parish still bears the original tower cross atop the spire, of the old St. Lambert Church of Veghel.

The tower cross was presented as a gift by the St. Lambert Parish of Veghel in 1873, which would start the demolition of its old church that following year, because of the completion of a new and larger church.

== Gallery ==
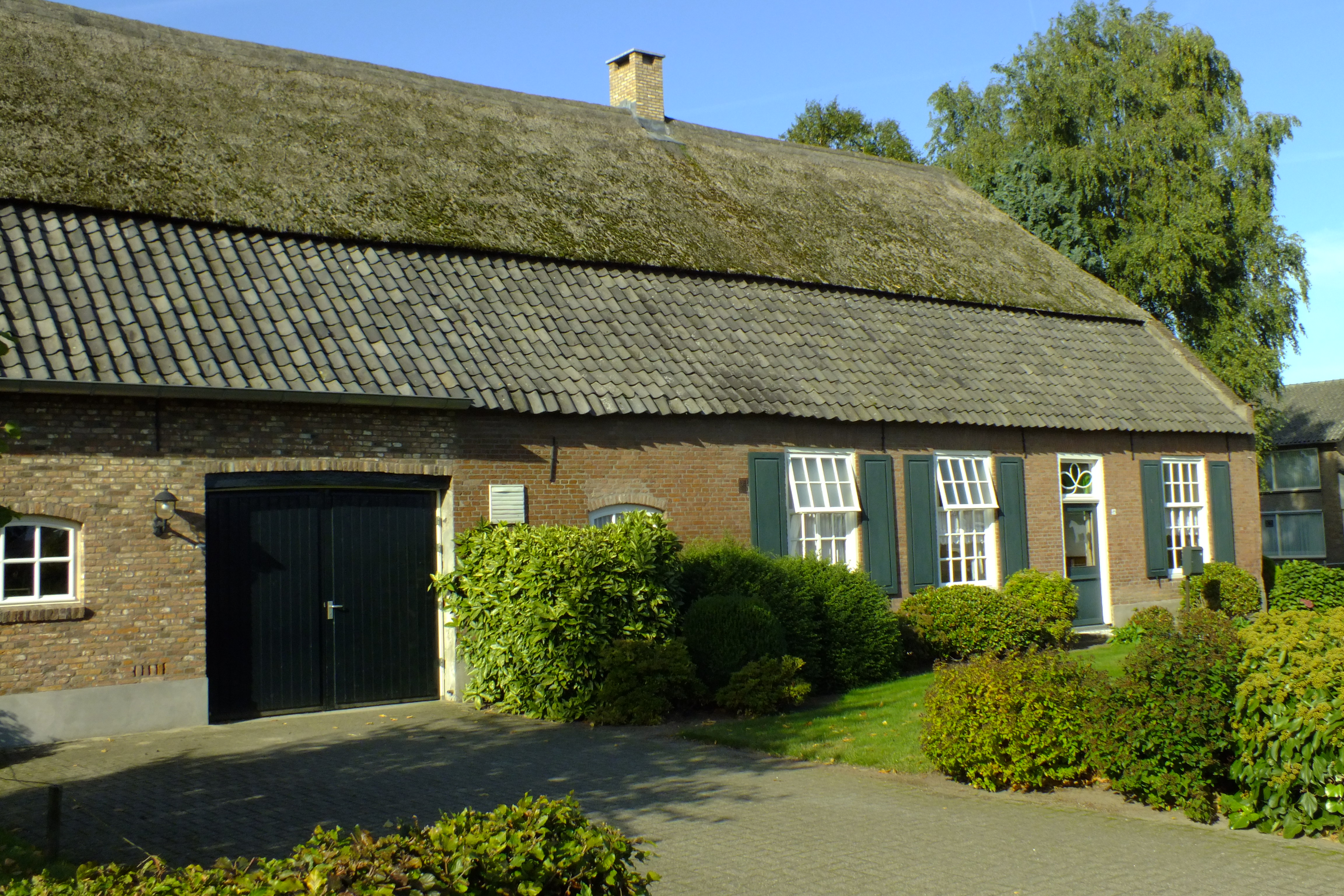
A farmhouse in Zijtaart

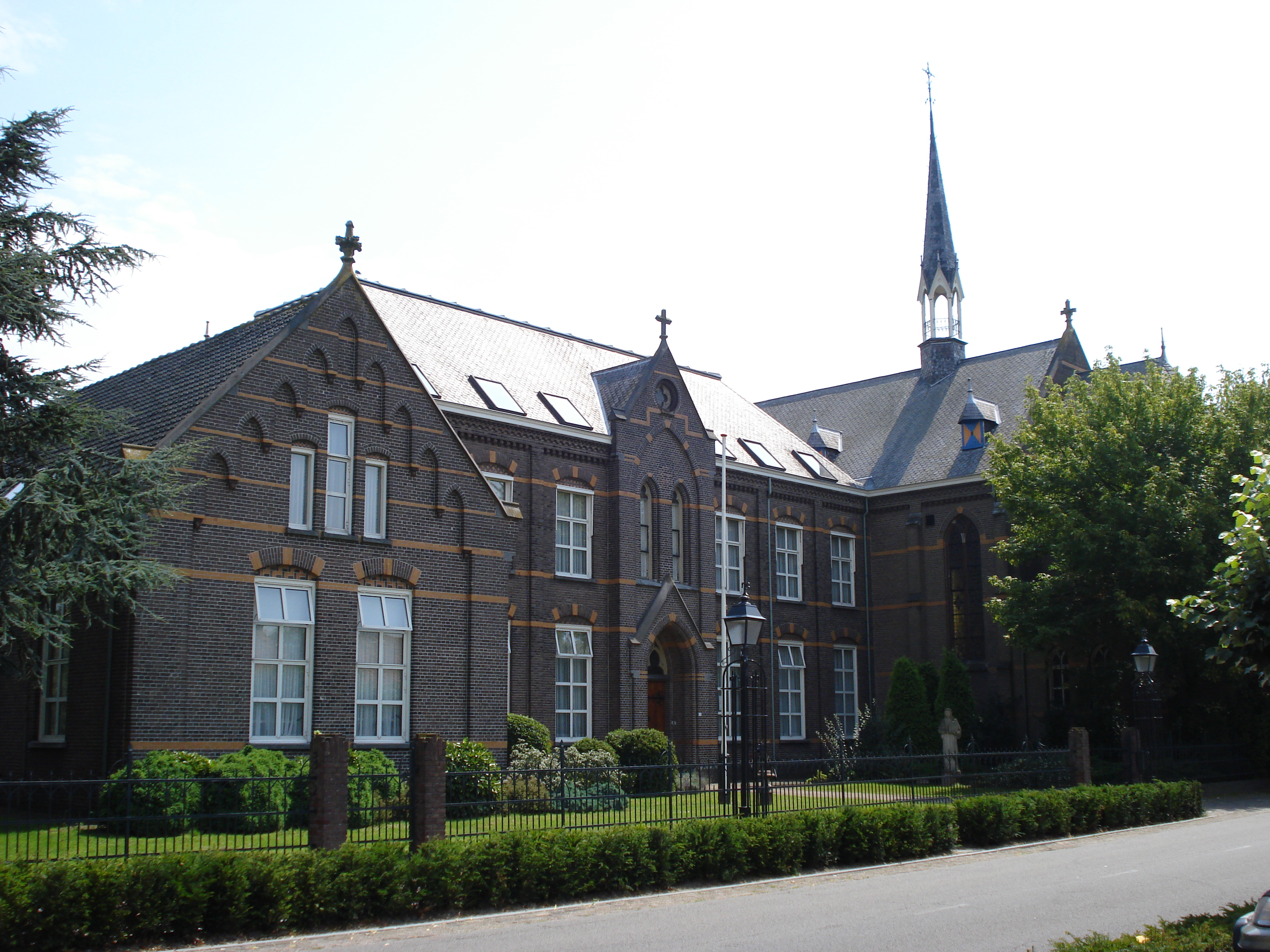
Former women's monastery

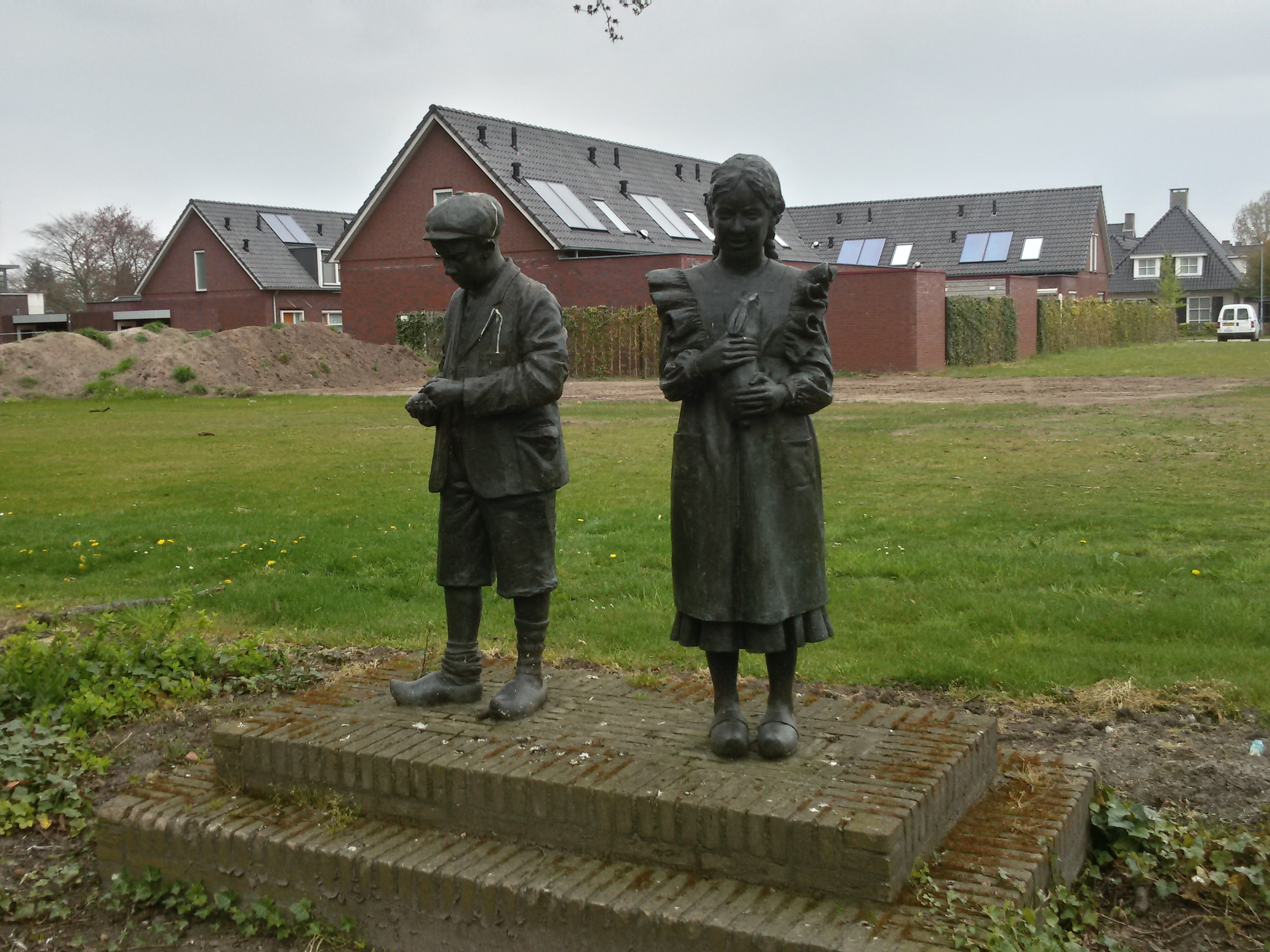
Two children statue
