= 1992 Virginia Slims of Florida =

- Date: March 2–8
- Edition: 14th
- Category: Tier I
- Draw: 56S / 28D
- Prize money: $550,000
- Surface: Hard / outdoor
- Location: Boca Raton, Florida, U.S.
- Venue: The Polo Club

Champions

Singles
- (Germany) Steffi Graf

Doubles
- (Latvia) Larisa Neiland / (Commonwealth of Independent States) Natasha Zvereva
← 1991 ·	Virginia Slims of Florida	· 1993 →

The 1992 Virginia Slims of Florida was a women's tennis tournament played on outdoor hard courts at the Polo Club in Boca Raton, Florida in the United States that was part of Tier I of the 1992 WTA Tour. It was the 14th edition of the tournament and was held from March 2 through March 8, 1992. First-seeded Steffi Graf won the singles title, her third at the event after 1987 and 1989, and earned $110,000 first-prize money as well as 400 ranking points.

== Finals ==
=== Singles ===
(Germany) Steffi Graf defeated (Spain) Conchita Martínez 3–6, 6–2, 6–0

- It was Graf's 1st title of the year and the 62nd of her career.

=== Doubles ===
(Latvia) Larisa Neiland / (Commonwealth of Independent States) Natasha Zvereva defeated (United States) Linda Harvey-Wild / (Spain) Conchita Martínez 6–2, 6–2
