= Eerde =

- Village
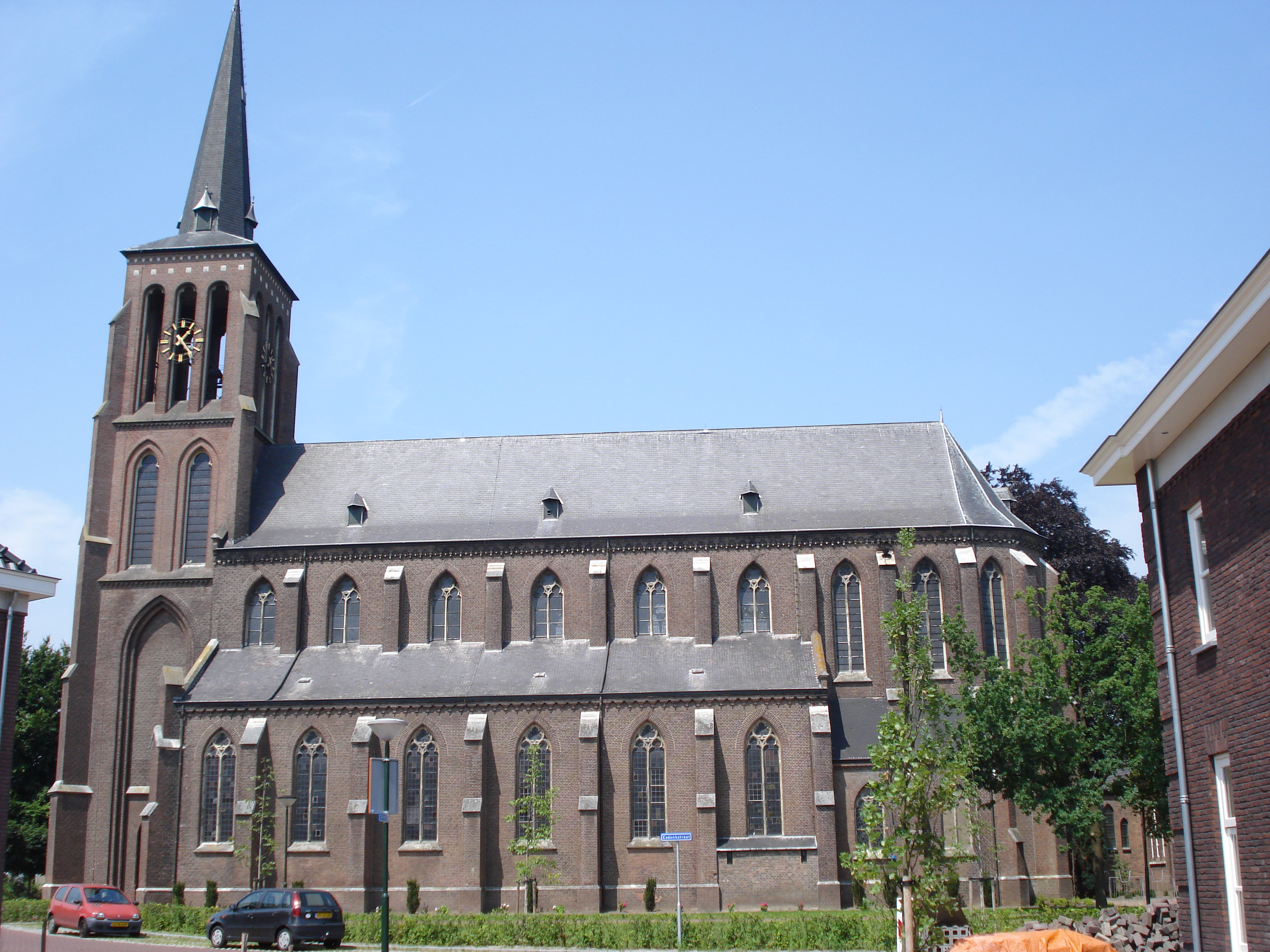
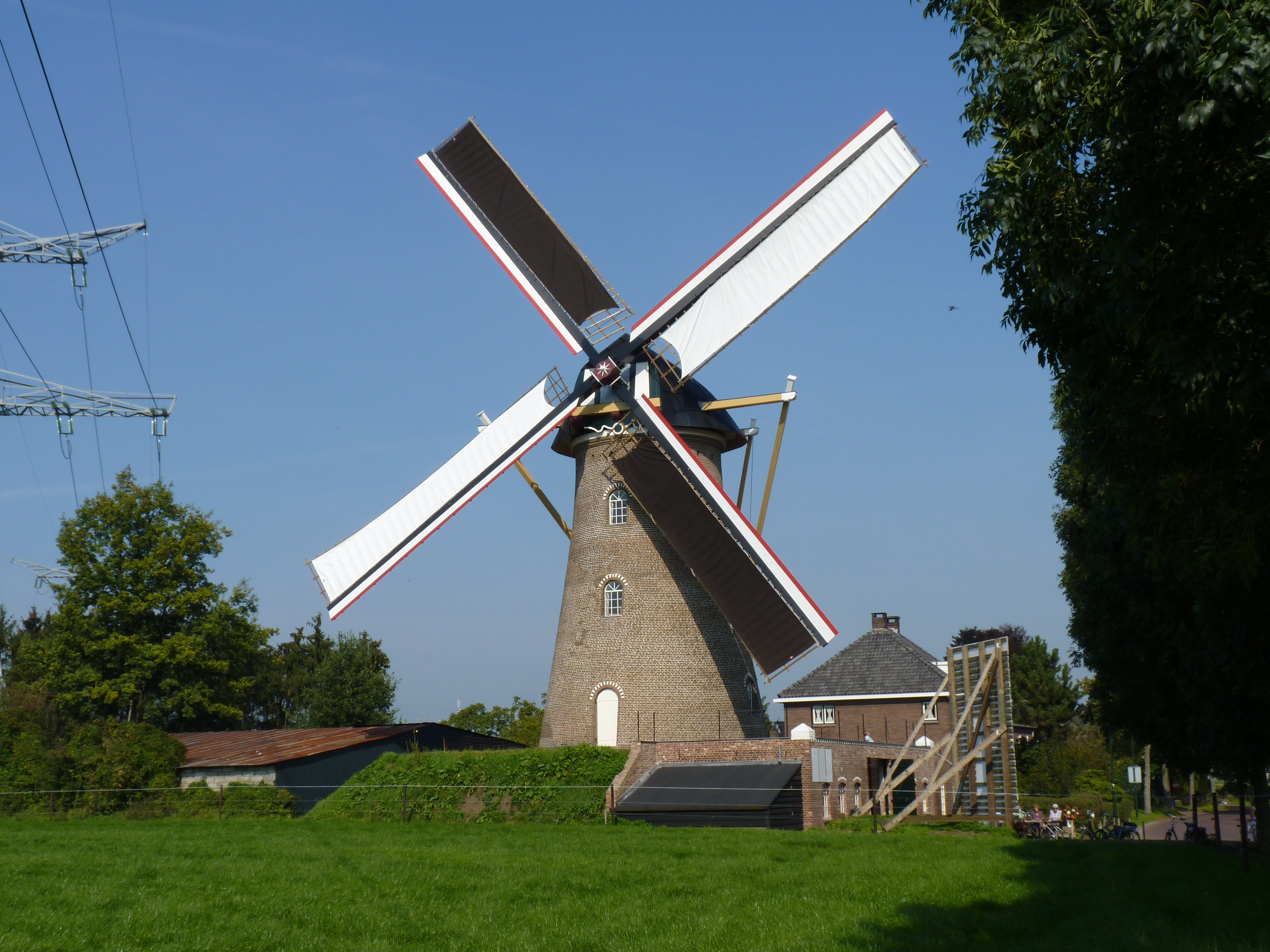
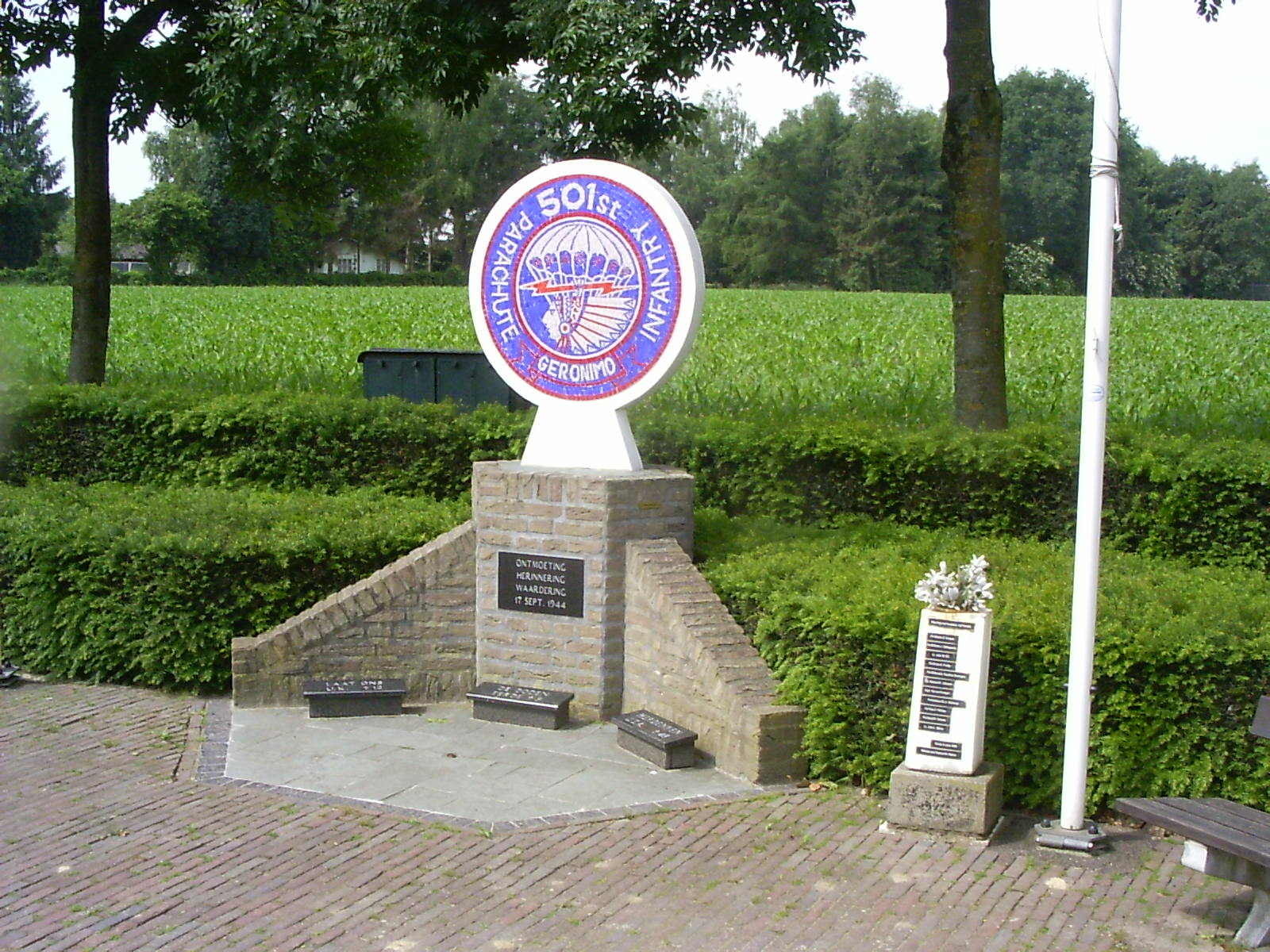
- From top down, left to right: St. Anthony Abbot Church; St. Anyhony Mill, Airborne monument 'Geronimo'

- Location in the province of North Brabant in the Netherlands Eerde (Netherlands)
- Coordinates: 51°36′12.3″N 5°29′51.2″E
- Country: Netherlands
- Province: North Brabant
- Municipality: Meierijstad

Area
  - Total: 3.75 km^{2} (1.45 sq mi)
- Elevation: 10 m (33 ft)

Population (2021)
  - Total: 1,455
  - Density: 388/km^{2} (1,000/sq mi)
- Time zone: UTC+1 (CET)
  - Summer (DST): UTC+2 (CEST)
- Postal code: 5466
- Dialing code: 0413
- Major roads: A50

Eerde is a village in the Dutch province of North Brabant. It is part of the municipality of Meierijstad, located about 500 m west of the built-up area of Veghel and 3 km southwest of the town centre of Veghel. During Operation Market Garden, in September 1944, it changed hands several times between German and American forces but ended up in American hands; the village was severely damaged in the process.

The village was first mentioned in 1309 as Eirde, and means earth. Eerde was home to 174 people in 1840. It used to be part of three municipalities. In 1966, the whole area became part of Veghel and since 2016, it is part of Meierijstad.

== Gallery ==
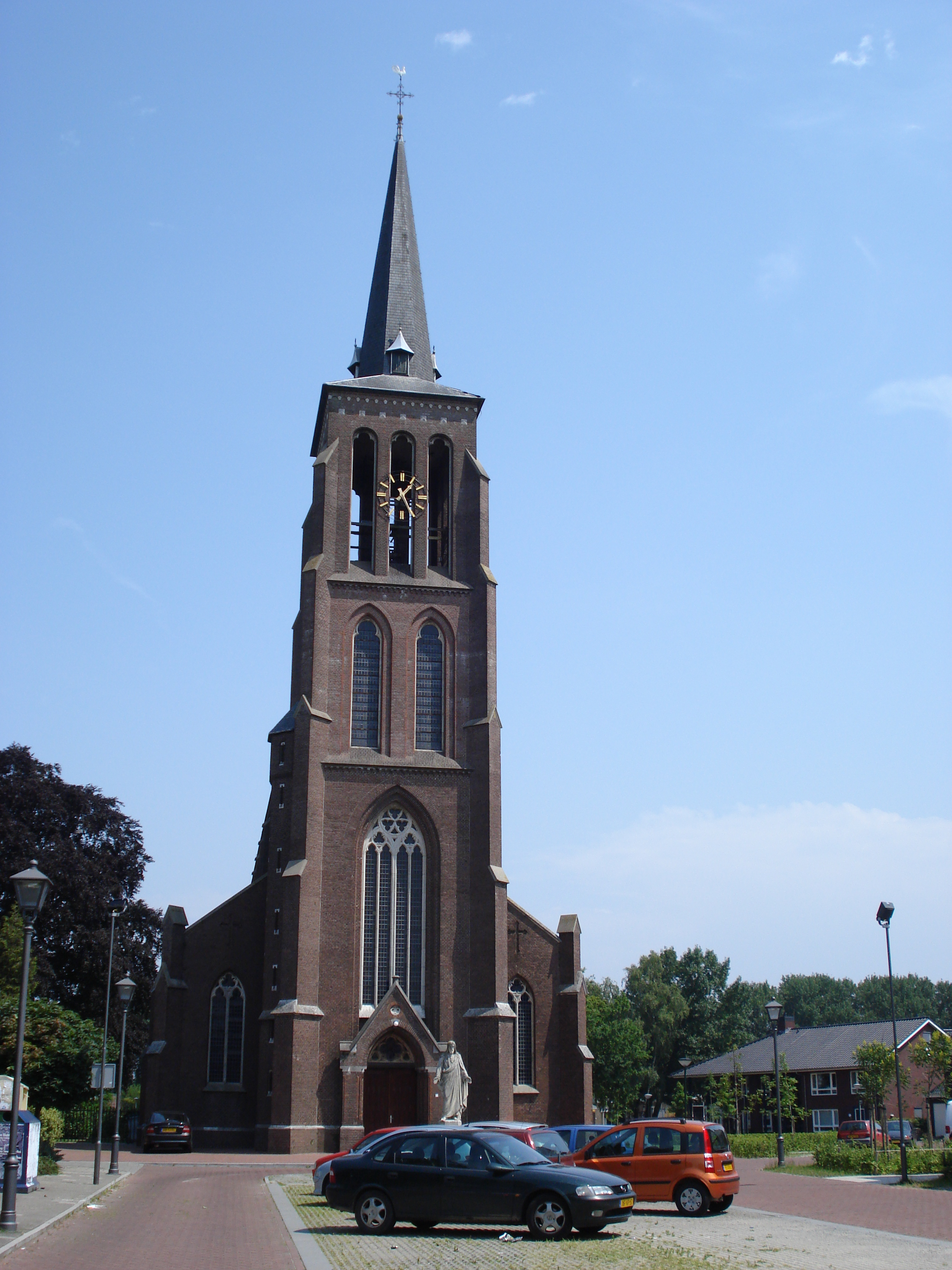
St. Anthony Abbot Church in Eerde
