= 1994 Virginia Slims of Florida – Doubles =

Doubles
- 1994 Virginia Slims of Florida
- 1993 Champions: (United States) Gigi Fernández; (Belarus) Natasha Zvereva

Final
- Champions: (Czech Republic) Jana Novotná; (Spain) Arantxa Sánchez Vicario
- Runners-up: (Netherlands) Manon Bollegraf; (Czech Republic) Helena Suková
- Score: 6–2, 6–0

Details
- Draw: 28
- Seeds: 8

Events
Singles	Doubles
← 1993 ·	Virginia Slims of Florida	· 1995 →

Gigi Fernández and Natasha Zvereva were the defending champions but did not compete that year.

Jana Novotná and Arantxa Sánchez Vicario won in the final 6–2, 6–0 against Manon Bollegraf and Helena Suková.

== Seeds ==
Champion seeds are indicated in bold text while text in italics indicates the round in which those seeds were eliminated. The top four seeded teams received byes into the second round.

1. (Czech Republic) **Jana Novotná** / (Spain) **Arantxa Sánchez Vicario (champions)**
2. (Netherlands) Manon Bollegraf / (Czech Republic) Helena Suková (final)
3. (United States) Lori McNeil / (Australia) Rennae Stubbs (semifinals)
4. (South Africa) Amanda Coetzer / (Argentina) Inés Gorrochategui (semifinals)
5. (United States) Mary Joe Fernández / (United States) Lisa Raymond (second round)
6. (United States) Katrina Adams / (United States) Kathy Rinaldi-Stunkel (first round)
7. (Canada) Jill Hetherington / (United States) Shaun Stafford (quarterfinals)
8. (Italy) Laura Golarsa / (Ukraine) Natalia Medvedeva (second round)

== Draw ==
=== Key ===
- Q = Qualifier
- WC = Wild card
- LL = Lucky loser
- Alt = Alternate
- SE = Special exempt
- PR = Protected ranking
- ITF = ITF entry
- JE = Junior exempt
- w/o = Walkover
- r = Retired
- d = Defaulted
- SR = Special ranking

=== Final ===
Final

1
- (Czech Republic) **Jana Novotná**
- (Spain) **Arantxa Sánchez Vicario**
**6**
**6**

2
- (Netherlands) Manon Bollegraf
- (Czech Republic) Helena Suková
2
0

=== Top half ===
First round

Second round

Quarterfinals

Semifinals

1
- (Czech Republic) **J Novotná**
- (Spain) **A Sánchez Vicario**
**6**
**6**

- (Romania) **C Cristea**
- (United States) **S Reece**
**6**
4
**7**

- (Romania) C Cristea
- (United States) S Reece
0
1

Q
- (Netherlands) P Kamstra
- (Netherlands) L Niemantsverdriet
2
**6**
5

1
- (Czech Republic) **J Novotná**
- (Spain) **A Sánchez Vicario**
**6**
**6**

- (United Kingdom) **V Lake**
- (United Kingdom) **C Wood**
4
**7**
**6**

7
- (Canada) J Hetherington
- (United States) S Stafford
4
2

- (Italy) S Farina
- (Argentina) F Labat
**6**
6
4

- (United Kingdom) V Lake
- (United Kingdom) C Wood
5
3

- (Netherlands) M Oremans
- (Netherlands) C Vis
3
4

7
- (Canada) **J Hetherington**
- (United States) **S Stafford**
**7**
**6**

7
- (Canada) **J Hetherington**
- (United States) **S Stafford**
**6**
**6**

1
- (Czech Republic) **J Novotná**
- (Spain) **A Sánchez Vicario**
**6**
6
**6**

3
- (United States) L McNeil
- (Australia) R Stubbs
4
**7**
1

3
- (United States) **L McNeil**
- (Australia) **R Stubbs**
**6**
**7**

- (Indonesia) R Tedjakusuma
- (Indonesia) S Anggarkusuma
3
4

- (United States) C Benjamin
- (United States) M Jackson-Nobrega
1
5

- (United States) **C Benjamin**
- (United States) **M Jackson-Nobrega**
**6**
**6**

3
- (United States) **L McNeil**
- (Australia) **R Stubbs**
**6**
**6**

- (United States) **N Arendt**
- (Croatia) **M Murić**
**6**
4
**6**

- (United States) N Arendt
- (Croatia) M Murić
4
2

- (United States) B Bowes
- (United States) M Werdel
0
**6**
3

- (United States) **N Arendt**
- (Croatia) **M Murić**
**7**
6
**6**

- (Poland) K Teodorowicz
- (Finland) P Thorén
3
4

5
- (United States) M J Fernández
- (United States) L Raymord
6
**7**
4

5
- (United States) **M J Fernández**
- (United States) **L Raymond**
**6**
**6**

=== Bottom half ===
First round

Second round

Quarterfinals

Semifinals

8
- (Italy) **L Golarsa**
- (Ukraine) **N Medvedeva**
**6**
**6**

- (Croatia) I Majoli
- (Germany) C Schneider
3
3

8
- (Italy) L Golarsa
- (Ukraine) N Medvedeva
5
**6**
2

WC
- (United States) M L Daniels
- (South Africa) D Van Rensburg
2
1

- (Russia) **E Likhovtseva**
- (Slovakia) **R Zrubáková**
**7**
4
**6**

- (Russia) **E Likhovtseva**
- (Slovakia) **R Zrubáková**
**6**
**6**

- (Russia) E Likhovtseva
- (Slovakia) R Zrubáková
3
3

- (France) I Demongeot
- (Netherlands) B Schultz
3
2

4
- (South Africa) **A Coetzer**
- (Argentina) **I Gorrochategui**
**6**
**6**

WC
- (Latvia) **L Neiland**
- (Argentina) **G Sabatini**
**6**
**6**

WC
- (Latvia) L Neiland
- (Argentina) G Sabatini
**6**
1
2

4
- (South Africa) **A Coetzer**
- (Argentina) **I Gorrochategui**
3
**6**
**6**

4
- (South Africa) A Coetzer
- (Argentina) I Gorrochategui
2
**6**
1

6
- (United States) K Adams
- (United States) K Rinaldi-Stunkel
**7**
4
6

2
- (Netherlands) **M Bollegraf**
- (Czech Republic) **H Suková**
**6**
4
**6**

- (Indonesia) **Y Basuki**
- (Japan) **N Miyagi**
5
**6**
**7**

- (Indonesia) **Y Basuki**
- (Japan) **N Miyagi**
**6**
2
**6**

- (Canada) M Bernard
- (Canada) C Delisle
1
2

- (Canada) P Hy
- (United States) M Paz
3
**6**
3

- (Canada) **P Hy**
- (Argentina) **M Paz**
**6**
**6**

- (Indonesia) Y Basuki
- (Argentina) M Paz
**6**
2
3

- (United States) A deLone
- (United States) E deLone
2
0

2
- (Netherlands) **M Bollegraf**
- (Czech Republic) **H Suková**
3
**6**
**6**

- (South Africa) **R Fairbank-Nideffer**
- (United States) **C Rubin**
**6**
**6**

- (South Africa) R Fairbank-Nideffer
- (United States) C Rubin
2
4

2
- (Netherlands) **M Bollegraf**
- (Czech Republic) **H Suková**
**6**
**6**
