= 1992 Virginia Slims of Florida – Singles =

Singles
- 1992 Virginia Slims of Florida

Final
- Champion: (Germany) Steffi Graf
- Runner-up: (Spain) Conchita Martínez
- Score: 3–6, 6–2, 6–0

Details
- Draw: 56 (8 Q / 3 WC)
- Seeds: 16

Events
Singles	Doubles
- Virginia Slims of Florida

Steffi Graf defeated Conchita Martínez in the final, 3–6, 6–2, 6–0 to win the singles tennis title at the 1992 Virginia Slims of Florida.

Gabriela Sabatini was the two-time defending champion, but lost in the quarterfinals to Amanda Coetzer.

== Seeds ==
The top eight seeds received a bye to the second round.

1. (Germany) Steffi Graf (champion)
2. (Argentina) Gabriela Sabatini (quarterfinal)
3. (United States) Mary Joe Fernández (semifinal)
4. (Spain) Conchita Martínez (final)
5. (France) Nathalie Tauziat (quarterfinal)
6. (Commonwealth of Independent States) Leila Meskhi (third round)
7. (United States) Zina Garrison-Jackson (quarterfinal)
8. (Austria) Judith Wiesner (third round)
9. n/a
10. (Peru) Laura Gildemeister (third round)
11. (Japan) Kimiko Date (third round)
12. (Czechoslovakia) Radomira Zrubáková (third round)
13. (Commonwealth of Independent States) Natalia Zvereva (first round)
14. (Japan) Naoko Sawamatsu (third round)
15. (Netherlands) Brenda Schultz (third round)
16. (Germany) Barbara Rittner (quarterfinal)

== Draw ==
Key

- Q = Qualifier
- WC = Wild card
- LL = Lucky loser
- Alt = Alternate
- ITF = ITF entry
- PR = Protected ranking
- SR = Special ranking
- SE = Special exempt
- JE = Junior exempt
- JR = Junior Accelerator Programme entrant
- CO = College Accelerator Programme entrant
- NG = Next Gen Accelerator Program entrant
- w/o = Walkover
- r = Retired
- d = Defaulted

=== Finals ===
Quarterfinals
1	(Germany) Steffi Graf	6	5	7
7	(United States) Zina Garrison-Jackson	0	7	5
3	(United States) Mary Joe Fernández	6	6
5	(France) Nathalie Tauziat	4	2
16	(Germany) Barbara Rittner	1	0
4	(Spain) Conchita Martínez	6	6
(South Africa) Amanda Coetzer	4	6	6
2	(Argentina) Gabriela Sabatini	6	1	2

Semifinals
1	(Germany) Steffi Graf	6	7
3	(United States) Mary Joe Fernández	0	5
4	(Spain) Conchita Martínez	4	6	6
(South Africa) Amanda Coetzer	6	3	0

Final
1	(Germany) Steffi Graf	3	6	6
4	(Spain) Conchita Martínez	6	2	0

=== Top half ===
==== Section 1 ====
First round
(Italy) L Ferrando	6	6
Q	(United States) S Stafford	3	4
(Latvia) L Savchenko-Neiland	2	1
(Finland) P Thorén	6	6
(Indonesia) Y Basuki	3	2
14	(Japan) N Sawamatsu	6	6
15	(Netherlands) B Schultz	6	6
Q	(Germany) M Babel	2	1
Q	(Germany) A Müller	1	2
(France) A Dechaume	6	6
(Japan) M Kidowaki	6	6
(United States) L Harvey-Wild	4	4

Second round
1	(Germany) S Graf	6	6
(Italy) L Ferrando	1	2
(Finland) P Thorén	6	4
14	(Japan) N Sawamatsu	7	6
15	(Netherlands) B Schultz	6	2	6
(France) A Dechaume	2	6	2
(Japan) M Kidowaki	0	1
7	(United States) Z Garrison-Jackson	6	6

Third round
1	(Germany) S Graf	6	6
14	(Japan) N Sawamatsu	0	1
15	(Netherlands) B Schultz	5	6	3
7	(United States) Z Garrison-Jackson	7	4	6

Quarterfinals
1	(Germany) Steffi Graf	6	5	7
7	(United States) Zina Garrison-Jackson	0	7	5

==== Section 2 ====
First round
(France) I Demongeot	2	4
Q	(United States) C MacGregor	6	6
Q	(United States) D Faber	6	6	7
(United States) G Helgeson	1	7	5
Q	(United States) J Emmons	2	4
10	(Peru) L Gildemeister	6	6
12	(Czechoslovakia) R Zrubáková	7	6
(Argentina) B Fulco-Villella	6	1
(Japan) A Kijimuta	4	7	4
(Czechoslovakia) P Langrová	6	5	6
(Canada) H Kelesi	6	6
(Italy) K Piccolini	1	4

Second round
3	(United States) M Joe Fernández	6	6
Q	(United States) C MacGregor	4	1
Q	(United States) D Faber	6	4
10	(Peru) L Gildemeister	7	6
12	(Czechoslovakia) R Zrubáková	6	6
(Czechoslovakia) P Langrová	2	0
(Canada) H Kelesi	6	1	4
5	(France) N Tauziat	3	6	6

Third round
3	(United States) M Joe Fernández	6	7
10	(Peru) L Gildemeister	3	5
12	(Czechoslovakia) R Zrubáková	2	6
5	(France) N Tauziat	6	7

Quarterfinals
3	(United States) Mary Joe Fernández	6	6
5	(France) Nathalie Tauziat	4	2

=== Bottom half ===
==== Section 1 ====
First round
LL	(United Kingdom) C Wood	6	2
(United Kingdom) S Gomer	7	6
LL	(United Kingdom) A Grunfeld	6	6
(Italy) S Farina	3	4
Q	(United States) N Arendt	4	4
16	(Germany) B Rittner	6	6
11	(Japan) K Date	6	6
WC	(Canada) C Bassett-Seguso	2	1
WC	(United States) L Raymond	6	6
(United States) M Harper	3	1
(Czechoslovakia) E Švíglerová	7	6
(Australia) K Godridge	6	4

Second round
6	(Commonwealth of Independent States) L Meskhi	6	6
(United Kingdom) S Gomer	2	0
LL	(United Kingdom) A Grunfeld	1	3
16	(Germany) B Rittner	6	6
11	(Japan) K Date	7	6
WC	(United States) L Raymond	5	3
(Czechoslovakia) E Švíglerová	3	1
4	(Spain) C Martínez	6	6

Third round
6	(Commonwealth of Independent States) L Meskhi	2	3
16	(Germany) B Rittner	6	6
11	(Japan) K Date	1	6
4	(Spain) C Martínez	6	7

Quarterfinals
16	(Germany) Barbara Rittner	1	0
4	(Spain) Conchita Martínez	6	6

==== Section 2 ====
First round
(South Africa) E Reinach	6	1
(Commonwealth of Independent States) N Medvedeva	7	6
Q	(Netherlands) S Rottier	2	2
(South Africa) A Coetzer	6	6
(United States) M Werdel	4	5
LL	(Italy) N Baudone	6	7
13	(Commonwealth of Independent States) N Zvereva	6	4	0
(United States) C Rubin	1	6	6
WC	(United States) M Jackson-Nobrega	4	5
(United States) H Cioffi	6	7
(Czechoslovakia) R Rajchrtová	3	5
(United Kingdom) J Durie	6	7

Second round
8	(Austria) J Wiesner	3	6	7
(Commonwealth of Independent States) N Medvedeva	6	4	6
(South Africa) A Coetzer	6	6
LL	(Italy) N Baudone	3	4
(United States) C Rubin	4	6	6
(United States) H Cioffi	6	1	4
(United Kingdom) J Durie	2	0
2	(Argentina) G Sabatini	6	6

Third round
8	(Austria) J Wiesner	3	1
(South Africa) A Coetzer	6	6
(United States) C Rubin	2	2
2	(Argentina) G Sabatini	6	6

Quarterfinals
(South Africa) Amanda Coetzer	4	6	6
2	(Argentina) Gabriela Sabatini	6	1	2
