= 1992 Virginia Slims of Florida – Doubles =

Doubles
- 1992 Virginia Slims of Florida

Final
- Champions: (Latvia) Larisa Neiland (Commonwealth of Independent States) Natasha Zvereva
- Runners-up: (United States) Linda Harvey-Wild (Spain) Conchita Martínez
- Score: 6–2, 6–2

Details
- Draw: 28 (1 Q / 2 WC)
- Seeds: 8

Events
Singles	Doubles
- Virginia Slims of Florida

Larisa Neiland Natasha Zvereva were the defending champions and successfully defended their title, defeating Linda Harvey-Wild Conchita Martínez in the final, 6–2, 6–2.

== Seeds ==
The top four seeds received a bye to the second round.

1. (Latvia) Larisa Savchenko-Neiland / (Commonwealth of Independent States) Natalia Zvereva (champions)
2. (United States) Sandy Collins / (South Africa) Elna Reinach (second round)
3. (Canada) Jill Hetherington / (United States) Kathy Rinaldi (second round)
4. (France) Nathalie Tauziat / (Austria) Judith Wiesner (second round)
5. (United States) Mareen Harper / (United States) Cammy MacGregor (second round)
6. (Commonwealth of Independent States) Natalia Medvedeva / (Commonwealth of Independent States) Leila Meskhi (first round)
7. (United Kingdom) Jo Durie / (South Africa) Lise Gregory (quarterfinal)
8. (United States) Meredith McGrath / (Australia) Rennae Stubbs (semifinal)

== Draw ==
Key

- Q = Qualifier
- WC = Wild card
- LL = Lucky loser
- Alt = Alternate
- ITF = ITF entry
- PR = Protected ranking
- SR = Special ranking
- SE = Special exempt
- JE = Junior exempt
- JR = Junior Accelerator Programme entrant
- CO = College Accelerator Programme entrant
- NG = Next Gen Accelerator Program entrant
- w/o = Walkover
- r = Retired
- d = Defaulted

=== Finals ===
Semifinals
1	(Latvia) Larisa Savchenko-Neiland (Commonwealth of Independent States) Natalia Zvereva	6	6
(Germany) Eva Pfaff (France) Catherine Suire	2	0
(United States) Linda Harvey-Wild (Spain) Conchita Martínez	6	6
8	(United States) Meredith McGrath (Australia) Rennae Stubbs	3	4

Final
1	(Latvia) Larisa Savchenko-Neiland (Commonwealth of Independent States) Natalia Zvereva	6	6
(United States) Linda Harvey-Wild (Spain) Conchita Martínez	2	2

=== Top half ===
First round
(United Kingdom) B Borneo (France) N Herreman	4	1
(Japan) K Date (Peru) L Gildemeister	6	6
(United States) N Arendt (United States) P Mager	6	2	7
(Netherlands) M Kiene (Netherlands) M Oremans	2	6	5
(Canada) H Kelesi (Netherlands) B Schultz	2	2
7	(United Kingdom) J Durie (South Africa) L Gregory	6	6
(Italy) S Farina (Italy) L Ferrando	7	4	6
(Czechoslovakia) P Langrová (Czechoslovakia) R Zrubáková	6	6	4
(Indonesia) Y Basuki (Japan) N Miyagi	3	6	5
Q	(Japan) A Kijimuta (Japan) N Sawamatsu	6	2	7
(Germany) E Pfaff (France) C Suire	7	4	6
6	(Commonwealth of Independent States) N Medvedeva (Commonwealth of Independent States) L Meskhi	5	6	2

Second round
1	(Latvia) L Savchenko-Neiland (Commonwealth of Independent States) N Zvereva	7	6
(Japan) K Date (Peru) L Gildemeister	5	2
(United States) N Arendt (United States) P Mager	5	4
7	(United Kingdom) J Durie (South Africa) L Gregory	7	6
3	(Canada) J Hetherington (United States) K Rinaldi	3	6	1
(Italy) S Farina (Italy) L Ferrando	6	2	6
Q	(Japan) A Kijimuta (Japan) N Sawamatsu	6	3	6
(Germany) E Pfaff (France) C Suire	2	6	0

Quarterfinals
1	(Latvia) L Savchenko-Neiland (Commonwealth of Independent States) N Zvereva	6	6
7	(United Kingdom) J Durie (South Africa) L Gregory	3	3
(Italy) S Farina (Italy) L Ferrando	6	6
(Germany) E Pfaff (France) C Suire	7	7

Semifinals
1	(Latvia) Larisa Savchenko-Neiland (Commonwealth of Independent States) Natalia Zvereva	6	6
(Germany) Eva Pfaff (France) Catherine Suire	2	0

=== Bottom half ===
First round
5	(United States) M Harper (United States) C MacGregor	6	6
WC	(South Africa) M de Swardt (United States) B Nagelsen	4	2
(United States) L Harvey-Wild (Spain) C Martínez	7	6
(Germany) M Babel (Germany) B Rittner	6	1
(Australia) T Morton (United Kingdom) C Wood	1	6
(United States) S Stafford (United States) M Werdel	6	7
8	(United States) M McGrath (Australia) R Stubbs	6	6
(Argentina) B Fulco-Villella (United States) G Helgeson	1	3
WC	(United States) C. O'Reilly (United States) P. O'Reilly	5	6
(Poland) R Baranski (Netherlands) H ter Riet	7	7
(Czechoslovakia) E Švíglerová (Czechoslovakia) R Rajchrtová	1	2
(Australia) K Godridge (France) A Dechaume	6	6

Second round
5	(United States) M Harper (United States) C MacGregor	3	6	4
(United States) L Harvey-Wild (Spain) C Martínez	6	1	6
(United States) S Stafford (United States) M Werdel	6	7
4	(France) N Tauziat (Austria) J Wiesner	4	6
8	(United States) M McGrath (Australia) R Stubbs	6	6
(Poland) R Baranski (Netherlands) H ter Riet	1	0
(Australia) K Godridge (France) A Dechaume	6	7
2	(United States) S Collins (South Africa) E Reinach	4	5

Quarterfinals
(United States) L Harvey-Wild (Spain) C Martínez	6	6
(United States) S Stafford (United States) M Werdel	1	0
8	(United States) M McGrath (Australia) R Stubbs	6	6
(Australia) K Godridge (France) A Dechaume	2	3

Semifinals
(United States) Linda Harvey-Wild (Spain) Conchita Martínez	6	6
8	(United States) Meredith McGrath (Australia) Rennae Stubbs	3	4
