= 1994 Virginia Slims of Florida =

Women's tennis tournament

- Date: February 28 – March 6
- Edition: 16th
- Category: Tier II
- Draw: 56S / 28D
- Prize money: $400,000
- Surface: Hard / outdoor
- Location: Delray Beach, Florida, U.S.
- Venue: Delray Beach Tennis Center

Champions

Singles
- (Germany) Steffi Graf

Doubles
- (Czech Republic) Jana Novotná / (Spain) Arantxa Sánchez Vicario
- Virginia Slims of Florida

The 1994 Virginia Slims of Florida was a women's tennis tournament played on outdoor hard courts at the Delray Beach Tennis Center in Delray Beach, Florida in the United States that was part of Tier II of the 1994 WTA Tour. The tournament was held from February 28 through March 6, 1994. First-seeded Steffi Graf won her third consecutive singles title at the event and her fifth in total.

== Finals ==
=== Singles ===
(Germany) Steffi Graf defeated (Spain) Arantxa Sánchez Vicario 6–3, 7–5

- It was Graf's 4th singles title of the year and the 83rd of her career.

=== Doubles ===
(Czech Republic) Jana Novotná / (Spain) Arantxa Sánchez Vicario defeated (Netherlands) Manon Bollegraf / (Czech Republic) Helena Suková 6–2, 6–0

- It was Novotná's 1st title of the year and the 56th of her career. It was Sánchez Vicario's 1st title of the year and the 39th of her career.
