= 1994 Virginia Slims of Florida – Singles =

Singles
- 1994 Virginia Slims of Florida

Final
- Champion: (Germany) Steffi Graf
- Runner-up: (Spain) Arantxa Sánchez Vicario
- Score: 6–3, 7–5

Details
- Draw: 56
- Seeds: 16

Events
Singles	Doubles
- Virginia Slims of Florida

Steffi Graf was the defending champion and won in the final 6–3, 7–5 against Arantxa Sánchez Vicario.

== Seeds ==
A champion seed is indicated in bold text while text in italics indicates the round in which that seed was eliminated. The top eight seeds received a bye to the second round.

1. (Germany) **Steffi Graf (champion)**
2. (Spain) Arantxa Sánchez Vicario (final)
3. (Argentina) Gabriela Sabatini (quarterfinals)
4. (South Africa) Amanda Coetzer (third round)
5. (Czech Republic) Helena Suková (semifinals)
6. (Austria) Judith Wiesner (third round)
7. (Germany) Sabine Hack (quarterfinals)
8. (United States) Lori McNeil (third round)
9. (Ukraine) Natalia Medvedeva (quarterfinals)
10. n/a
11. (Indonesia) Yayuk Basuki (second round)
12. (France) Julie Halard (third round)
13. (Netherlands) Brenda Schultz (third round)
14. (United States) Chanda Rubin (semifinals)
15. (Netherlands) Miriam Oremans (second round)
16. (Netherlands) Stephanie Rottier (quarterfinals)
17. (Argentina) Florencia Labat (third round)

== Draw ==
Key

- Q = Qualifier
- WC = Wild card
- LL = Lucky loser
- Alt = Alternate
- ITF = ITF entry
- PR = Protected ranking
- SR = Special ranking
- SE = Special exempt
- JE = Junior exempt
- JR = Junior Accelerator Programme entrant
- CO = College Accelerator Programme entrant
- NG = Next Gen Accelerator Program entrant
- w/o = Walkover
- r = Retired
- d = Defaulted

=== Finals ===
Semifinals
WC/1	(Germany) **Steffi Graf**	**7**	**6**
5	(Czech Republic) Helena Suková	5	4
14	(United States) Chanda Rubin	2	3
2	(Spain) **Arantxa Sánchez Vicario**	**6**	**6**

Final
WC/1	(Germany) **Steffi Graf**	**6**	**7**
2	(Spain) Arantxa Sánchez Vicario	3	5

=== Top half ===
==== Section 1 ====
First round
(United States) B Bowes	1	1
(United States) **M Werdel**	**6**	**6**
(Russia) **E Likhovtseva**	**6**	**6**
LL	(United States) E deLone	3	2
(Australia) M Jaggard-Lai	4	**6**	4
11	(Indonesia) **Y Basuki**	**6**	1	**6**
13	(Netherlands) **B Schultz**	**6**	**6**
(Slovakia) K Studeníková	2	3
Q	(Paraguay) L Schaerer	**6**	0	1
(United States) **S Stafford**	4	**6**	**6**
LL	(United States) **J Steven**	4	**7**	**6**
(Greece) C Papadáki	**6**	5	3

Second round
WC/1	(Germany) **S Graf**	**6**	**7**
(United States) M Werdel	0	5
(Russia) **E Likhovtseva**	**6**	**6**
11	(Indonesia) Y Basuki	3	1
13	(Netherlands) **B Schultz**	**6**	**6**
(United States) S Stafford	2	0
LL	(United States) J Steven	2	1
7	(Germany) **S Hack**	**6**	**6**

Third round
WC/1	(Germany) **S Graf**	**6**	**6**
(Russia) E Likhovtseva	2	4
13	(Netherlands) B Schultz	5	1
7	(Germany) **S Hack**	**7**	**6**

Quarterfinals
WC/1	(Germany) **S Graf**	**6**	**6**
7	(Germany) S Hack	2	1

==== Section 2 ====
First round
(United States) N Arendt	4	3
Q	(Italy) **E Savoldi**	**6**	**6**
LL	(Canada) **S Jeyaseelan**	**6**	**6**
WC	(Georgia (country)) N Louarsabishvili	3	2
(Indonesia) R Tedjakusuma	**7**	4	2
15	(Netherlands) **M Oremans**	6	**6**	**6**
17	(Argentina) **F Labat**	5	**6**	**6**
WC	(Canada) M Bernard	**7**	0	1
(Germany) M Kochta	6	**6**	6
(Austria) **B Reinstadler**	**7**	4	**7**
(Romania) C Cristea	1	1
(Canada) **P Hy**	**6**	**6**

Second round
3	(Argentina) **G Sabatini**	**6**	**6**
Q	(Italy) E Savoldi	4	2
LL	(Canada) **S Jeyaseelan**	**7**	4	**6**
15	(Netherlands) M Oremans	5	**6**	4
17	(Argentina) **F Labat**	**6**	**6**
(Austria) B Reinstadler	4	0
(Canada) P Hy	2	2
5	(Czech Republic) **H Suková**	**6**	**6**

Third round
3	(Argentina) **G Sabatini**	**6**	**6**
LL	(Canada) S Jeyaseelan	2	2
17	(Argentina) F Labat	3	1
5	(Czech Republic) **H Suková**	**6**	**6**

Quarterfinals
3	(Argentina) G Sabatini	4	4
5	(Czech Republic) **H Suková**	**6**	**6**

=== Bottom half ===
==== Section 3 ====
First round
(Latvia) **L Neiland**	**6**	**6**
(Belarus) T Ignatieva	2	3
(Italy) **S Farina**	**6**	**6**
Q	(Netherlands) P Kamstra	4	1
Q	(Spain) E Jiménez	1	1
9	(Ukraine) **N Medvedeva**	**6**	**6**
14	(United States) **C Rubin**	**6**	**6**
(Croatia) I Majoli	0	0
(United Kingdom) **C Wood**	3	**6**	**6**
(United States) S Cacic	**6**	4	2
(United States) **J Watanabe**	**6**	**7**
Q	(Argentina) P Suárez	1	6

Second round
8	(United States) **L McNeil**	**7**	**6**
(Latvia) L Neiland	5	2
(Italy) S Farina	3	3
9	(Ukraine) **N Medvedeva**	**6**	**6**
14	(United States) **C Rubin**	**6**	**6**
(United Kingdom) C Wood	2	3
(United States) J Watanabe	1	1
4	(South Africa) **A Coetzer**	**6**	**6**

Third round
8	(United States) L McNeil	**6**	2	2
9	(Ukraine) **N Medvedeva**	4	**6**	**6**
14	(United States) **C Rubin**	3	**6**	**7**
4	(South Africa) A Coetzer	**6**	2	5

Quarterfinals
9	(Ukraine) N Medvedeva	4	0
14	(United States) **C Rubin**	**6**	**6**

==== Section 4 ====
First round
(South Africa) E Reinach	1	1
(United States) **C Kuhlman**	**6**	**6**
Q	(South Africa) **D Van Rensburg**	**6**	**6**
(South Africa) R Fairbank-Nideffer	3	3
(United States) K Rinaldi-Stunkel	0	**6**	4
16	(Netherlands) **S Rottier**	**6**	4	**6**
12	(France) **J Halard**	1	**6**	**7**
(Canada) R Simpson-Alter	**6**	2	6
Q	(Italy) R Grande	**6**	0	3
Q	(Venezuela) **M Vento**	4	**6**	**6**
(United States) **L Raymond**	**7**	**6**
(Italy) L Golarsa	5	1

Second round
6	(Austria) **J Wiesner**	**2**
(United States) C Kuhlman	0	r
Q	(South Africa) D Van Rensburg	2	1
16	(Netherlands) **S Rottier**	**6**	**6**
12	(France) **J Halard**	**6**	**6**
Q	(Venezuela) M Vento	4	3
(United States) L Raymond	5	1
2	(Spain) **A Sánchez Vicario**	**7**	**6**

Third round
6	(Austria) J Wiesner	**6**	2	4
16	(Netherlands) **S Rottier**	1	**6**	**6**
12	(France) J Halard	1	1
2	(Spain) **A Sánchez Vicario**	**6**	**6**

Quarterfinals
16	(Netherlands) S Rottier	3	2
2	(Spain) **A Sánchez Vicario**	**6**	**6**
