= Mariaheide =

- Village
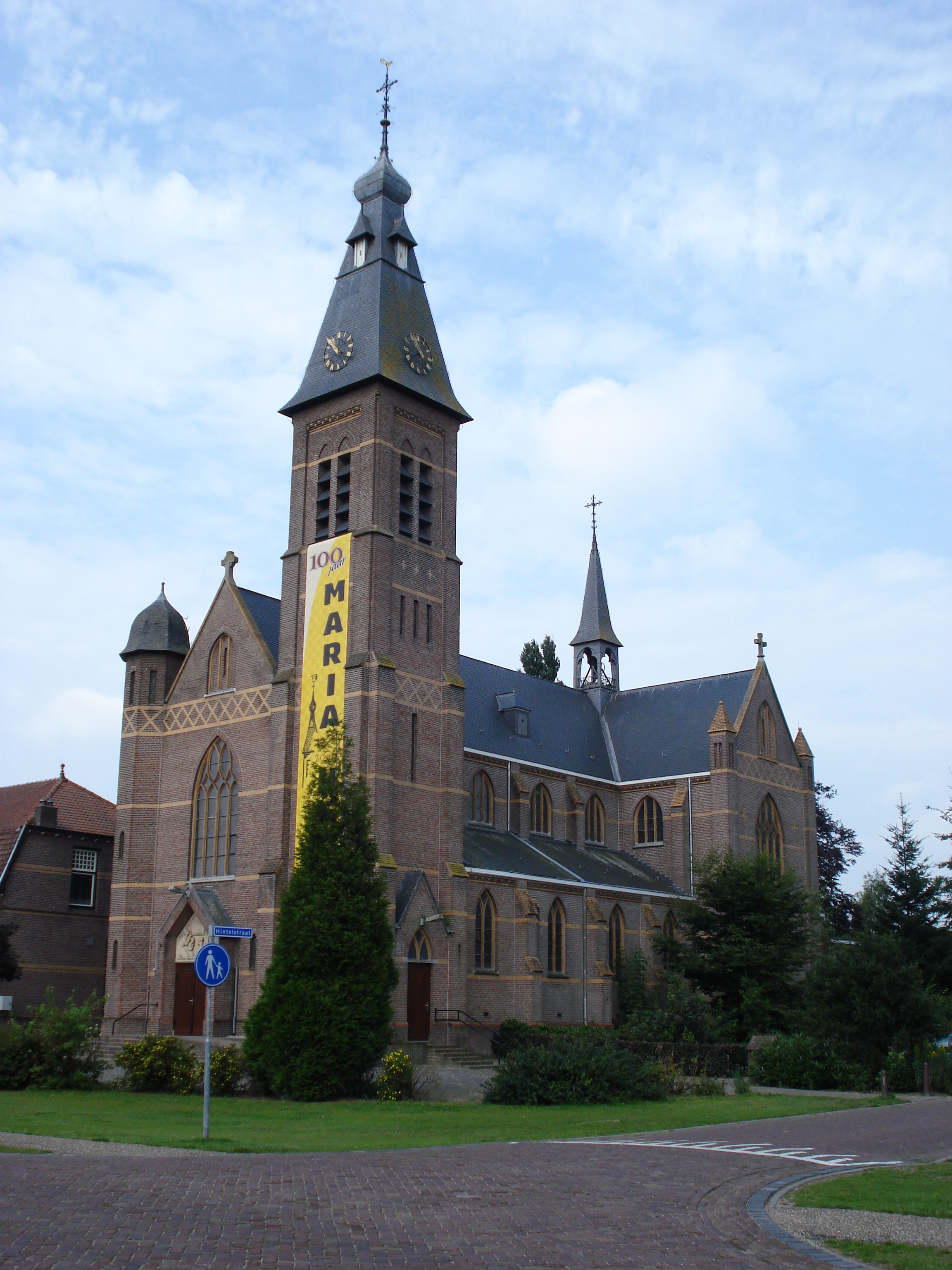
- Our Lady of Good Counsel Church in Mariaheide

- Location in the province of North Brabant in the Netherlands Mariaheide (Netherlands)
- Coordinates: 51°38′02″N 5°34′49″E
- Country: Netherlands
- Province: North Brabant
- Municipality: Meierijstad

Area
  - Total: 4.18 km^{2} (1.61 sq mi)
- Elevation: 9 m (30 ft)

Population (2021)
  - Total: 1,650
  - Density: 395/km^{2} (1,020/sq mi)
- Time zone: UTC+1 (CET)
  - Summer (DST): UTC+2 (CEST)
- Postal code: 5464
- Dialing code: 0413
- Major roads: A50, N265

Mariaheide is a village in the south of the Netherlands. It is situated in the municipality of Meierijstad, North Brabant.

== History ==
Mariaheide was founded as a linear settlement along the road from Veghel to Uden. Real population growth never got off the ground though, and in 1907 Mariaheide still only consisted of several farms on cultivated former heathland. However that year, Mariaheide split off from the St. Lambert Parish in Veghel, to form a new and separate parish, the Our Lady of Good Counsel Parish, and got its own church. In 1912, the Franciscan Sisters of the Immaculate Conception of the Holy Mother of God from Veghel, founded the St. Nicholas Monastery in Mariaheide.

== Gallery ==
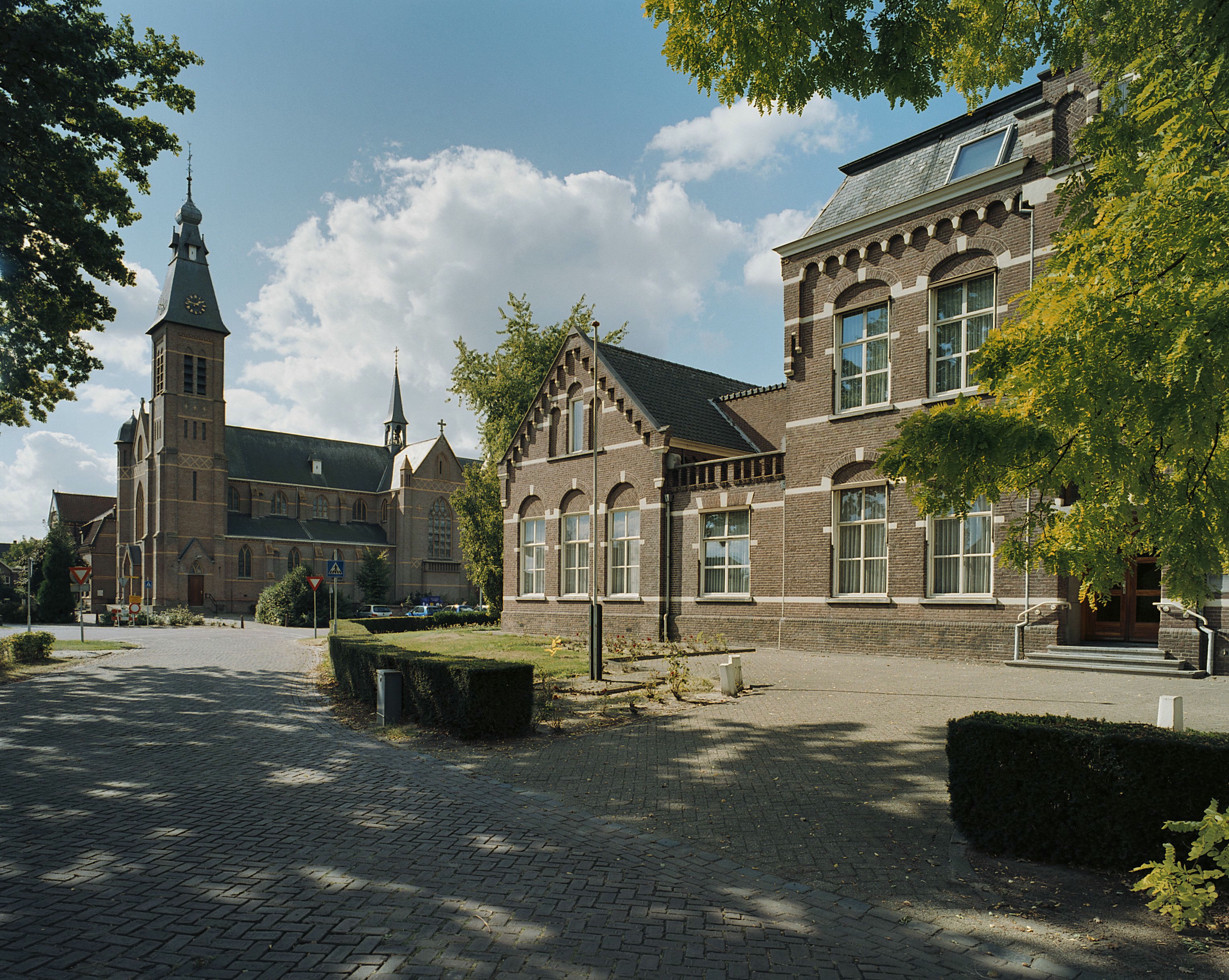
Church and monastery

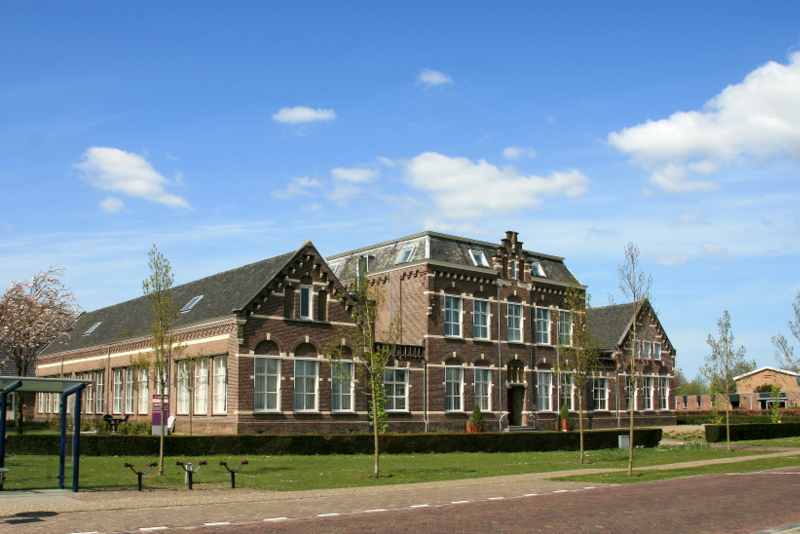
St. Nicholas Monastery

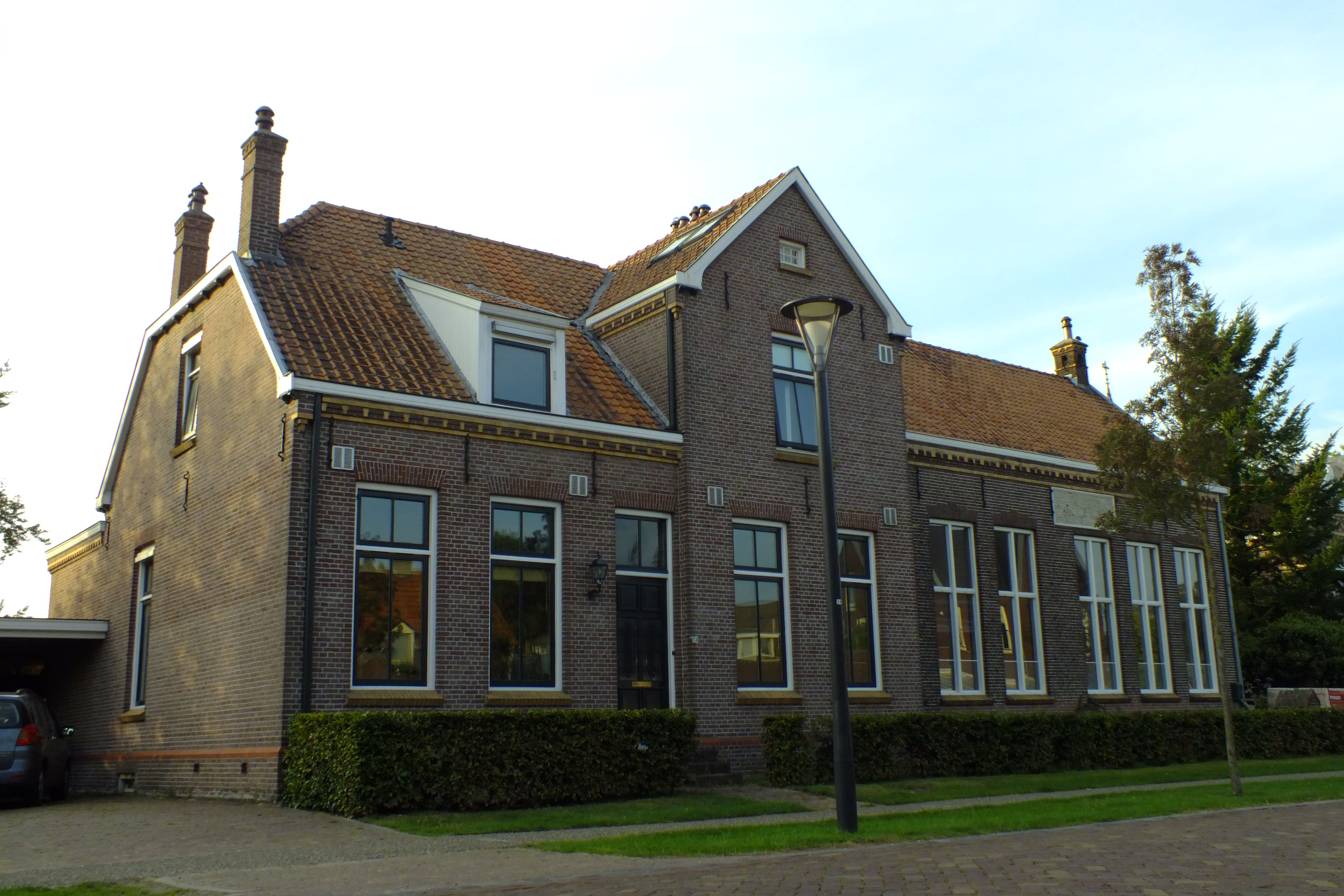
Our Lady of Good Counsel School

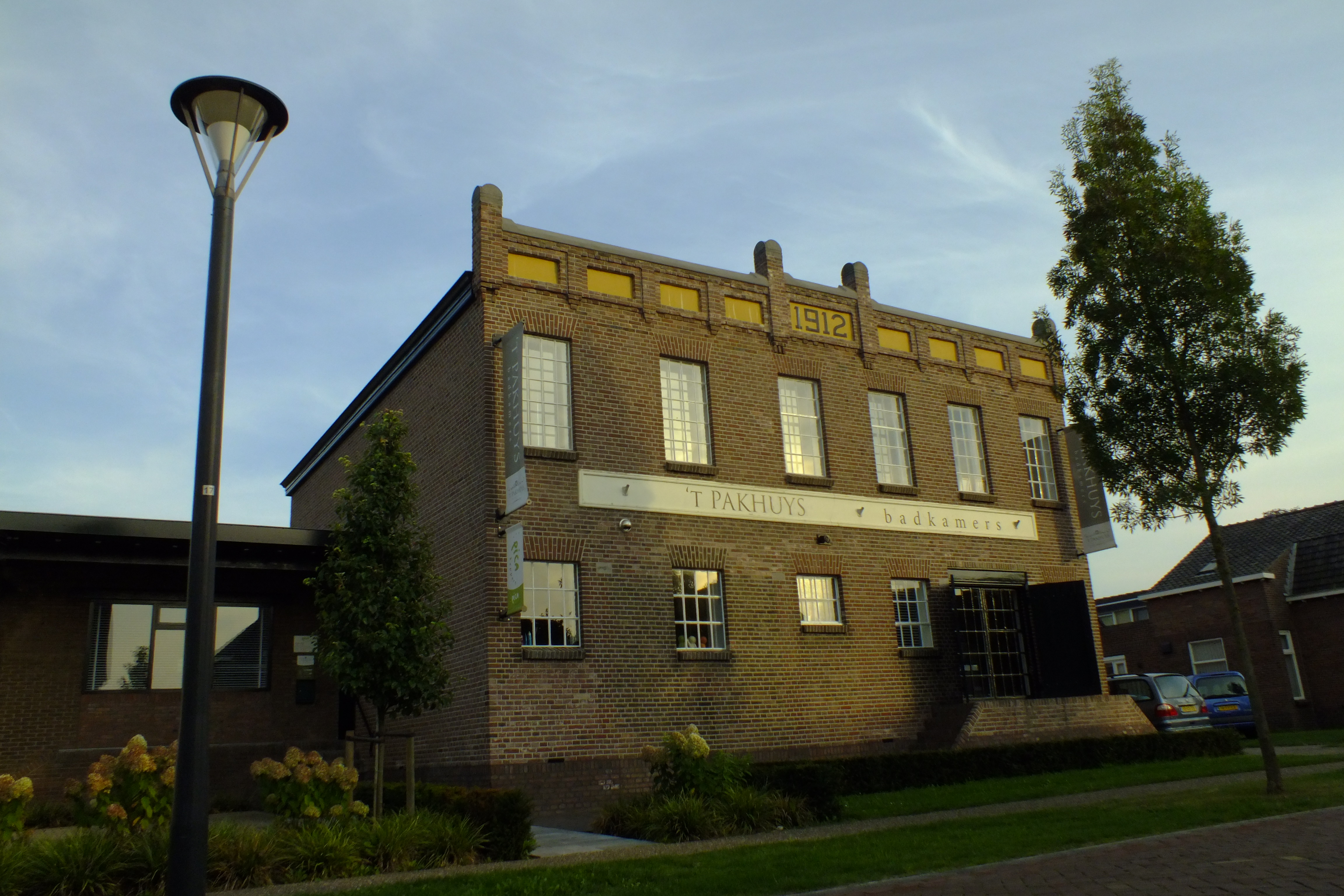
Monumental warehouse

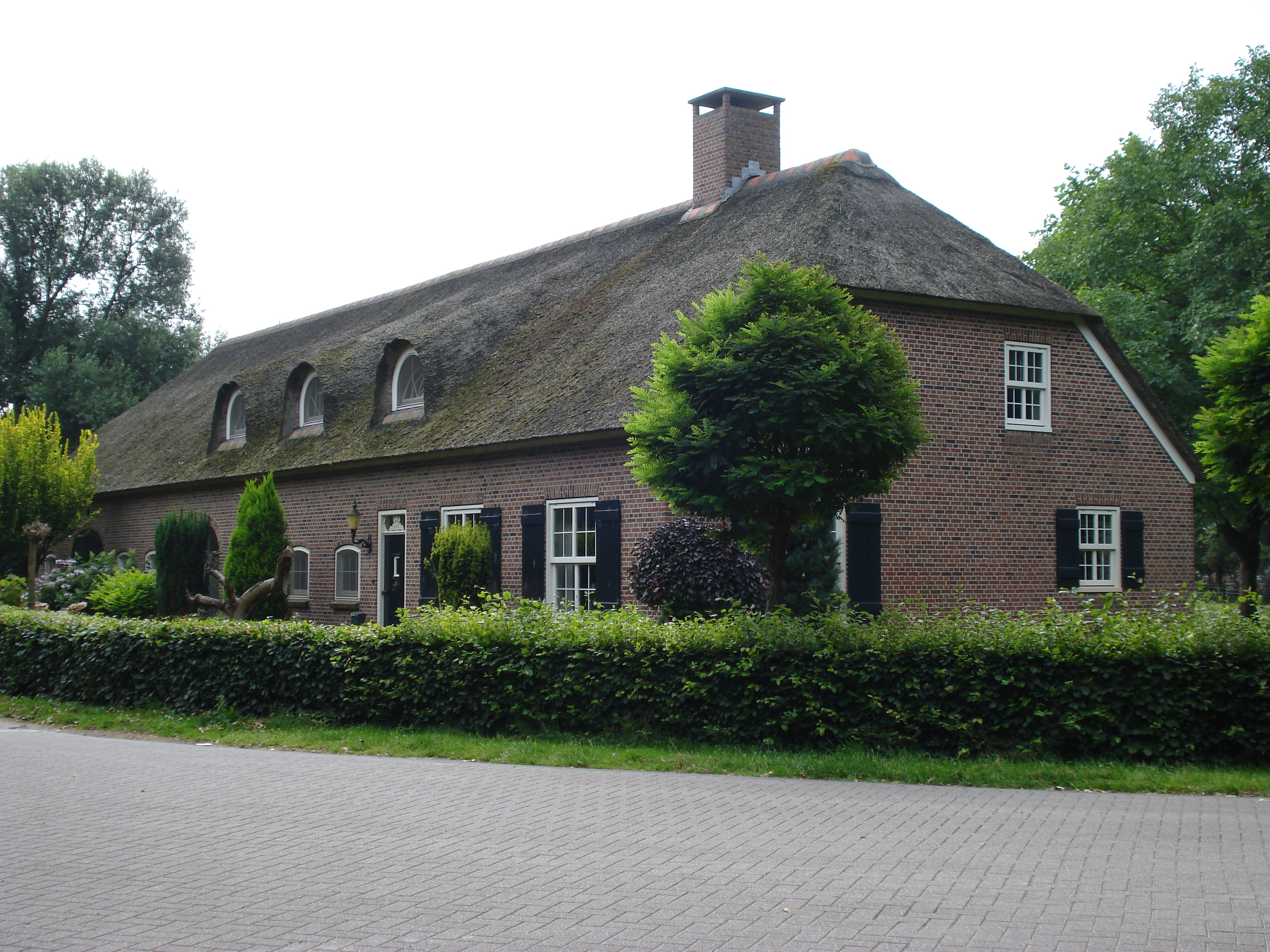
Farmhouse
