= Ton Smits =

Ton Smits (February 18, 1921 – August 5, 1981) was a Dutch cartoonist and comic artist. He was born in Veghel and moved to Eindhoven in 1938. He published his first cartoon in 1941 in the magazine De Humorist using the pseudonym Tommy. In the Helmondse Courant he published the comics Karel Kwiek, Daniel Daazer and Dolly and the jewelry robbery. He drew many political cartoons after his move to Amsterdam in 1947 for Dutch newspapers such as Het Vrije Volk and De Telegraaf. In 1954 he got a contract with The New Yorker. He won numerous prizes including the Golden Palm at the Salon of Humor in the Italian Bordighera.

He died in Eindhoven in 1981 of throat cancer. There is an annual cartoon prize named for him called the Ton Smits coin. A small museum called the Ton Smits House was created in Eindhoven in the house where Smits lived to display his paintings and cartoons.

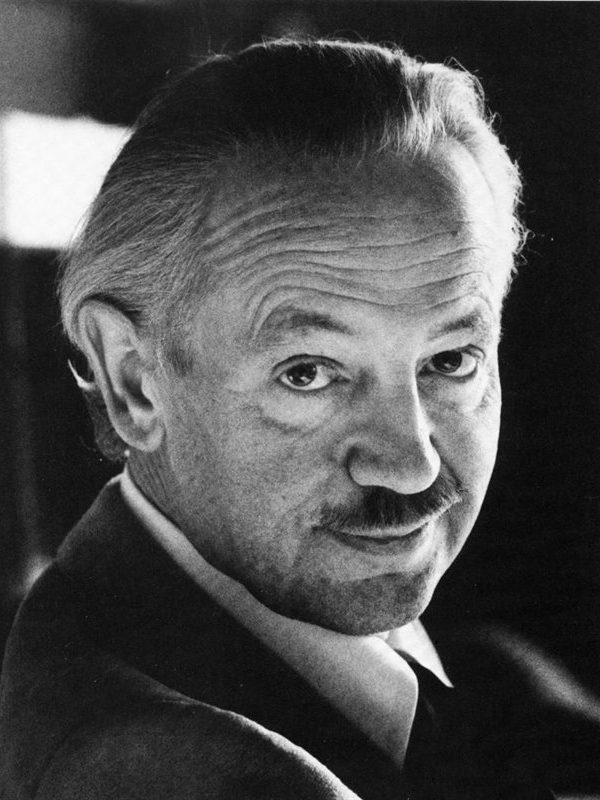
Ton Smits, was a Dutch cartoonist and comic artist.
