= 1993 Virginia Slims of Florida =

- Date: March 1–7
- Edition: 15th
- Draw: 56S / 28D
- Prize money: $375,000
- Surface: Hard / outdoor
- Location: Delray Beach, Florida, U.S.
- Venue: Delray Beach Tennis Center

Champions

Singles
- (Germany) Steffi Graf

Doubles
- (United States) Gigi Fernández / (Belarus) Natasha Zvereva
← 1992 ·	Virginia Slims of Florida	· 1994 →

The 1993 Virginia Slims of Florida was a women's tennis tournament played on outdoor hard courts at the Delray Beach Tennis Center in Delray Beach, Florida in the United States that was part of Tier II of the 1993 WTA Tour. It was the 15th edition of the tournament and was held from March 1 through March 7, 1993. First-seeded Steffi Graf won the singles title, her fourth at the event, and earned $75,000 first-prize money as well as 300 ranking points.

== Finals ==
=== Singles ===
(Germany) Steffi Graf defeated (Spain) Arantxa Sánchez Vicario 6–4, 6–3

- It was Graf's 1st title of the year and the 70th of her career.

=== Doubles ===
(United States) Gigi Fernández / (Belarus) Natasha Zvereva defeated (Latvia) Larisa Neiland / (Czech Republic) Jana Novotná 6–2, 6–2

- It was Fernández' 2nd title of the year and the 33rd of her career. It was Zvereva's 2nd title of the year and the 30th of her career.
